= Gray Crag =

Lake District fell in Cumbria, England

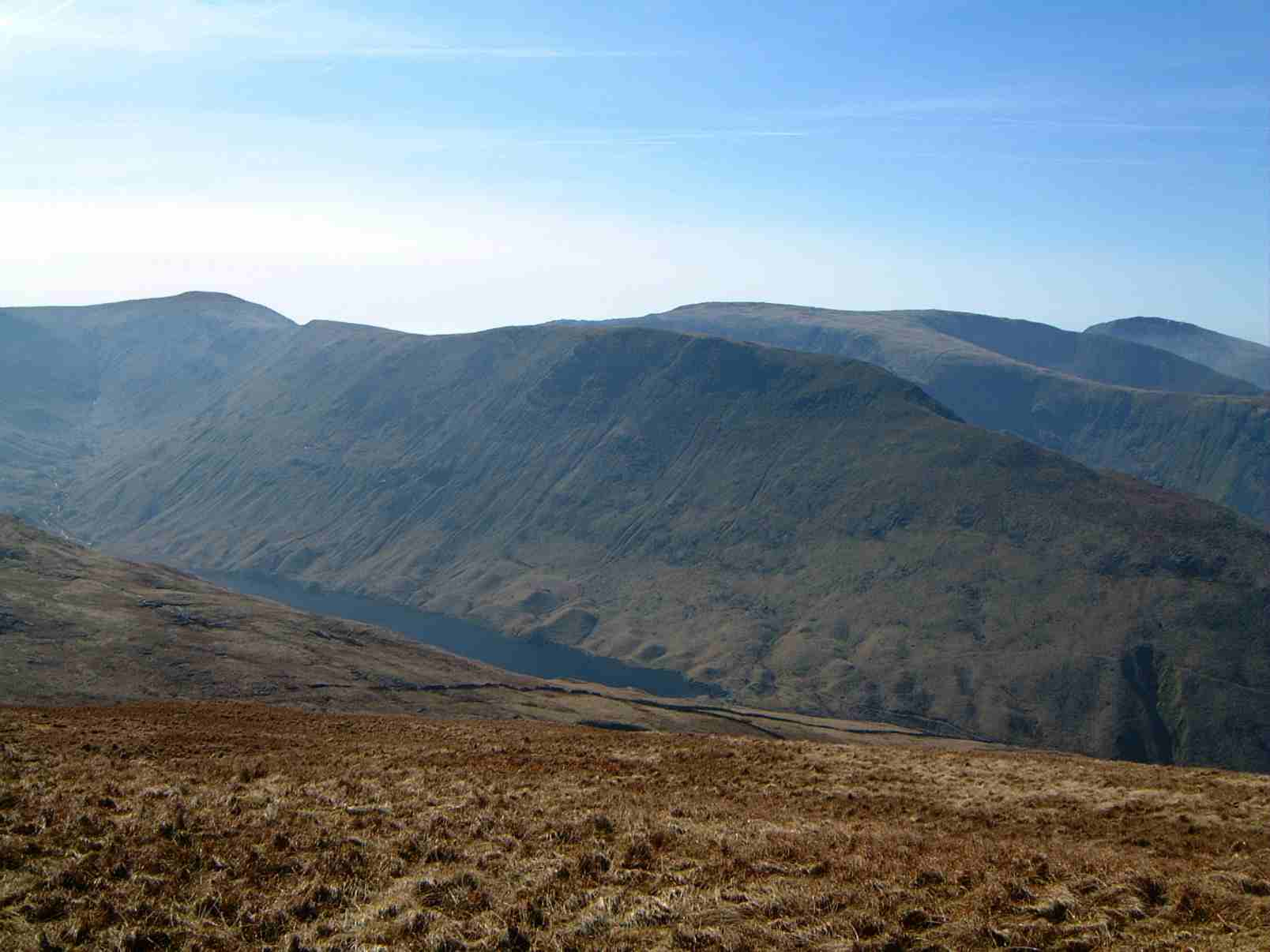
- Gray Crag seen from the slopes of Rest Dodd 1.5 km to the north, Hayeswater is visible in the valley.

Highest point
- Elevation: 699 m (2,293 ft)
- Prominence: c. 15 m
- Parent peak: Thornthwaite Crag
- Listing: Wainwright, Nuttall
- Coordinates: 54°29′51″N 2°53′10″W

Geography
- Location within the Lake District
- Location: Cumbria, England
- Parent range: Lake District, Far Eastern Fells
- OS grid: NY427117
- Topo map: Landranger 90, OS Explorer OL5

Gray Crag is a fell in the Lake District in Cumbria, England.

== Topography ==
The fell reaches a height of 699 metres (2,293 feet) at the northern end of its summit ridge and this is the accepted highest point which gives the best views, although there is a spot height of 710 metres (2,330 feet) less than a kilometre to the south. Both tops have small cairns set on grass. Gray Crag is located in the far eastern sector of the national park, five kilometres south east of the village of Patterdale, and is basically the narrow grassy northern ridge of the adjoining fell of Thornthwaite Crag. It is characterised by very steep flanks with crags and gullies which fall away towards Hayeswater on the eastern side and Pasture Beck to the west. This fell should not be confused with Grey Crag, another Lakeland Fell located also in the far eastern sector above Longsleddale.

== Ascents ==
Gray Crag is almost invariably ascended from the hamlet of Hartsop where there is a car park, Hayeswater Gill is followed for 1.5 kilometres (1 mile) until the filter house just below Hayeswater is reached. The steep grassy northern ridge of Gray Crag is then ascended passing a rocky outcrop before reaching the flatter plateau and then the summit. An alternative from the same starting point is to follow Pasture Beck up to the head of the valley at Threshthwaite Mouth and then contour round onto Gray Crag. Alfred Wainwright gave this as his preferred route. Most walkers will continue their walk along the ridge south to Thornthwaite Crag which is two kilometres (1 1/4 miles) away and return to Hartsop over Caudale Moor and Hartsop Dodd.

== View ==
The view from the top gives a good aspect of the Helvellyn range, with other views obtained by walking to the edges of the ridge and looking down into the valleys on either side.
