= Rampsgill Head =

Fell in the Lake District, Cumbria, England

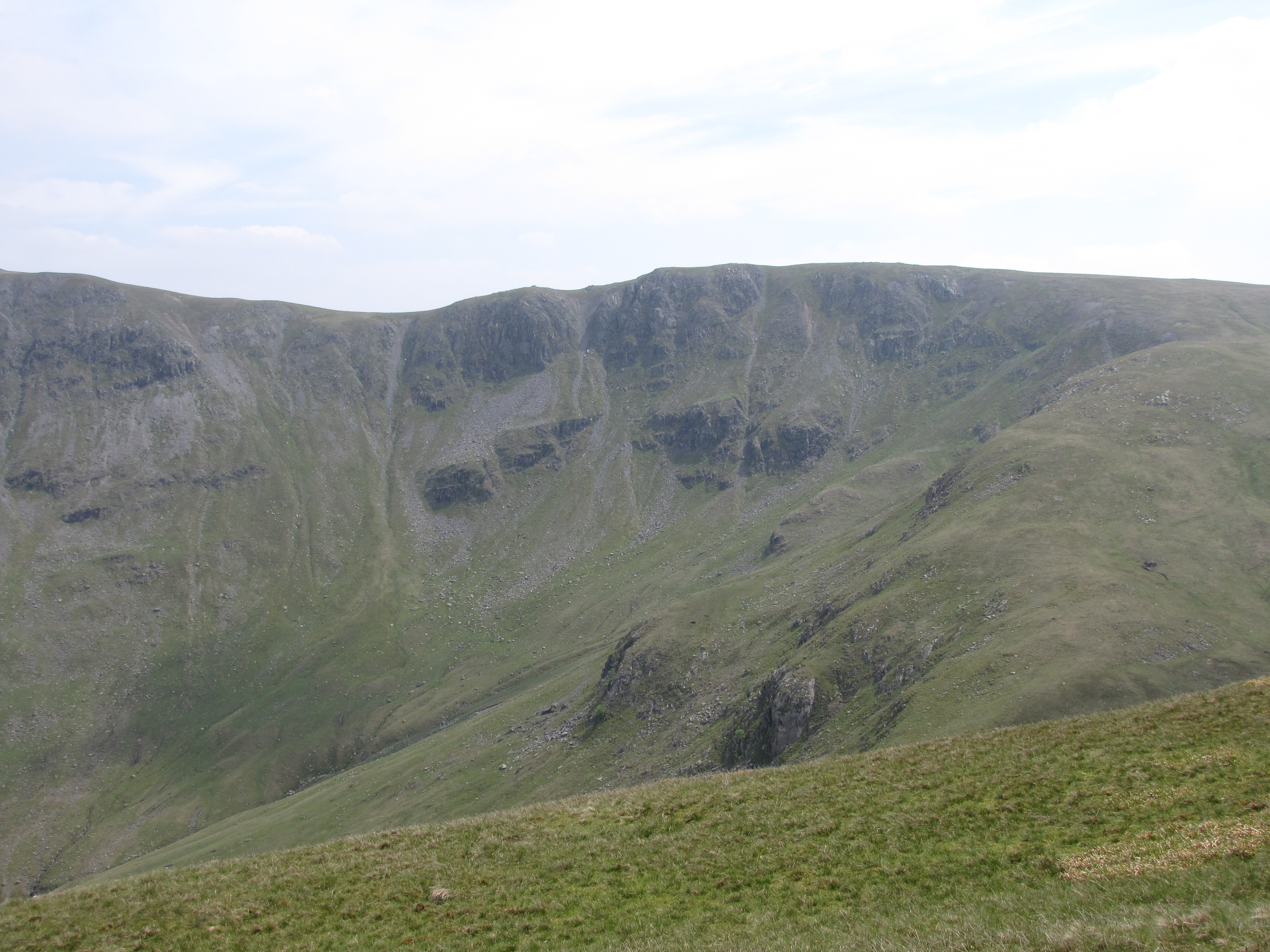
- Seen from Rest Dodd, 1.5 km to the NW.

Highest point
- Elevation: 792 m (2,598 ft)
- Prominence: c. 40 m
- Parent peak: High Raise
- Listing: Hewitt, Wainwright, Nuttall
- Coordinates: 54°30′27″N 2°51′42″W

Geography
- Location within the Lake District
- Location: Cumbria, England
- Parent range: Lake District, Far Eastern Fells
- OS grid: NY443128
- Topo map: OS Explorer OL5

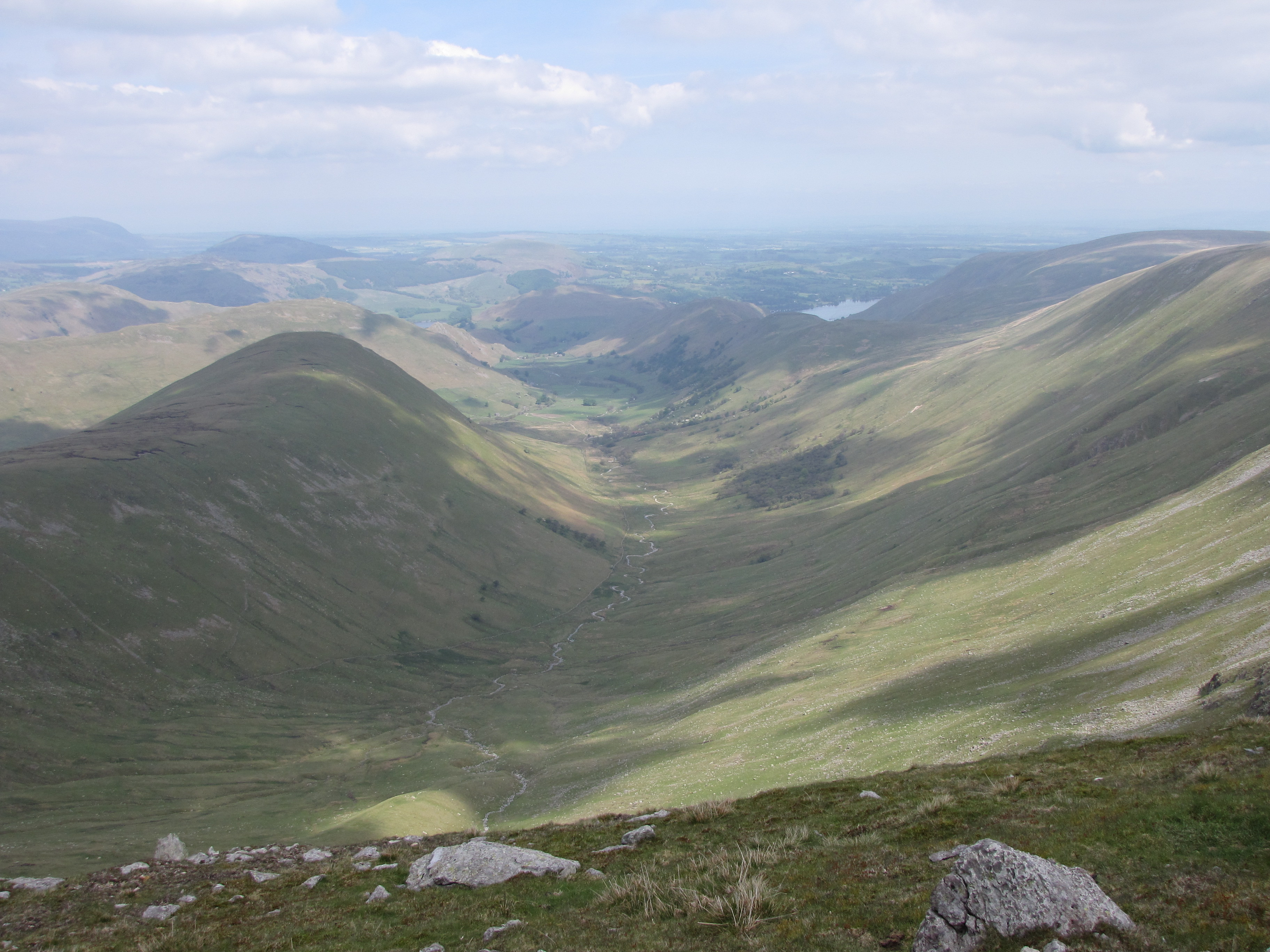
Looking down into the valley of Ramps Gill from the summit.

Rampsgill Head is a fell in the English Lake District, standing to the west of Haweswater Reservoir in the Far Eastern Fells. It forms the focal point of three ridges which fan out north-east, north-west and south.

== Topography ==
The spine of the Far Eastern Fells, travelling north from High Street, crosses the Straits of Riggindale and then collides head-on with the steep U-shaped valley of Rampsgill which comes south to meet it. The ridge splits in two, sending one arm around each side of Rampsgill and the Martindale valley system of which this forms part. The north-western branch leads over the fells of The Knott and Rest Dodd, finally reaching Place Fell above the head of Ullswater. The north-eastern branch continues the main ridge of the Far Eastern Fells, running over High Raise and ending near the foot of Ullswater at Heughescar Hill. Between these two embracing arms are the valleys of Boredale, Bannerdale, Rampsgill and Fusedale, collectively known as Martindale.

Rampsgill Head stands at the junction of these three ridges, with the summit a little to the north-east. Kidsty Pike, a subsidiary top to the east, is given separate fell status by Wainwright in his Pictorial Guide to the Lakeland Fells and that convention is followed here. Rampsgill Head therefore occupies a very small area for one of the higher fells.

The southern ridge to High Street is the narrowest, closing down to little more than the width of the path at the Straits of Riggindale. The north-eastern ridge is also narrow, once Kidsty Pike is passed, but the north-western ridge is much broader with the summit of The Knott standing off to the left.

The northern face of the fell drops 1,800 feet (550 m) over rough ground into the bowl of upper Rampsgill. The south-western flank above Hayeswater and the south-eastern above Riggindale (a feeder of Haweswater) are craggier, none of them giving a realistic route of ascent for the average walker.

== Ascents ==
High Street (the Roman road) crosses the fell to the south-east of the summit, passing along the ridge from High Street to High Raise. There is also a clear path along the third ridge to The Knott.

== Summit ==
The top is grassy with a little outcropped rock, a cairn marking the top. A larger cairn is set on the brink of the north face. The view westward to the Helvellyns is good with Ullswater and Brothers Water also visible. Ascents can be made via other fells from Patterdale, Hartsop and Mardale Head.

== Panorama ==
The following Wainwrights are visible on a clear day from the highest point of the fell (distances in miles):

1. Bonscale Pike, 7.1°, 4.4m
2. Loadpot Hill, 13.3°, 3.3m
3. Wether Hill, 17.4°, 2.2m
4. High Raise (Martindale), 39.0°, 0.5m
5. Selside Pike, 109.2°, 3.1m
6. Kidsty Pike, 123.0°, 0.3m
7. Branstree, 129.0°, 2.8m
8. Grey Crag, 135.8°, 4.8m
9. Tarn Crag (Longsleddale), 137.7°, 4.2m
10. Harter Fell (Mardale), 154.9°, 2.4m
11. Mardale Ill Bell, 170.6°, 1.7m
12. High Street, 185.4°, 1.1m
13. Thornthwaite Crag, 202.6°, 1.9m
14. Stony Cove Pike, 221.4°, 2.4m
15. Old Man of Coniston, 227.9°, 14.2m
16. Red Screes, 228.3°, 3.9m
17. Brim Fell, 229.6°, 13.9m
18. Wetherlam, 232.2°, 12.1m
19. Gray Crag, 232.9°, 1.2m
20. Swirl How, 233.4°, 13.1m
21. Great Carrs, 234.7°, 13.0m
22. Grey Friar, 235.0°, 13.8m
23. High Pike (Rydal), 238.9°, 5.0m
24. Harter Fell (Eskdale), 239.0°, 16.2m
25. Cold Pike, 242.1°, 12.6m
26. Pike of Blisco, 242.6°, 12.0m
27. Little Hart Crag, 242.4°, 3.9m
28. High Hartsop Dodd, 246.4°, 3.4m
29. Crinkle Crags, 246.9°, 13.1m
30. Dove Crag, 250.2°, 4.5m
31. Bowfell, 251.4°, 13.0m
32. Hartsop Dodd, 251.6°, 2.1m
33. The Knott, 252.5°, 0.4m
34. Great Rigg, 253.6°, 5.7m
35. Scafell, 254.2°, 15.2m
36. Esk Pike, 254.8°, 13.3m
37. Scafell Pike, 255.4°, 14.6m
38. Hart Crag, 257.3°, 4.8m
39. Great End, 257.6°, 13.8m
40. Hartsop above How, 261.1°, 3.8m
41. Fairfield, 261.9°, 5.3m
42. Red Pike (Wasdale), 264.6°, 17.3m
43. Haycock, 265.1°, 18.6m
44. Scoat Fell, 266.3°, 17.7m
45. Ullscarf, 266.7°, 9.5m
46. Steeple, 266.9°, 17.8m
47. Brandreth, 267.0°, 14.2m
48. Pillar, 267.8°, 16.9m
49. Dollywaggon Pike, 270.4°, 6.0m
50. St Sunday Crag, 273.3°, 4.6m
51. Nethermost Pike, 277.0°, 6.3m
52. Helvellyn, 282.0°, 6.5m
53. Birks, 282.5°, 4.0m
54. Catstycam, 286.4°, 6.2m
55. Brock Crags, 288.0°, 1.6m
56. White Side, 289.0°, 7.0m
57. Birkhouse Moor, 290.5°, 5.3m
58. Arnison Crag, 292.1°, 3.4m
59. Raise, 293.5°, 6.8m
60. Stybarrow Dodd, 300.4°, 7.3m
61. Angletarn Pikes, 302.2°, 2.2m
62. Sheffield Pike, 304.9°, 5.7m
63. Rest Dodd, 305.0°, 0.8m
64. Glenridding Dodd, 305.9°, 4.9m
65. Great Dodd, 306.4°, 7.9m
66. Hart Side, 308.4°, 6.8m
67. Skiddaw Little Man, 309.5°, 14.4m
68. Skiddaw, 310.8°, 15.2m
69. Lonscale Fell, 311.4°, 13.2m
70. Bakestall, 314.5°, 15.6m
71. Place Fell, 316.3°, 3.5m
72. Blencathra, 320.4°, 11.9m
73. Knott, 323.1°, 15.5m
74. Bannerdale Crags, 325.6°, 12.1m
75. Bowscale Fell, 327.4°, 12.9m
76. High Pike (Caldbeck), 329.9°, 15.8m
77. Souther Fell, 330.7°, 11.5m
78. Carrock Fell, 333.2°, 14.4m
79. Gowbarrow Fell, 337.0°, 5.9m
80. The Nab, 338.0°, 1.6m
81. Great Mell Fell, 338.8°, 8.3m
82. Beda Fell, 340.6°, 2.8m
83. Little Mell Fell, 348.9°, 7.0m
84. Hallin Fell, 350.7°, 4.4m
85. Steel Knotts, 355.9°, 3.3m

From the Wainwright summit one metre lower, the view excludes Wether Hill and Red Pike (Wasdale) but is otherwise identical.
