= The Knott =

Fell in the Lake District, Cumbria, England

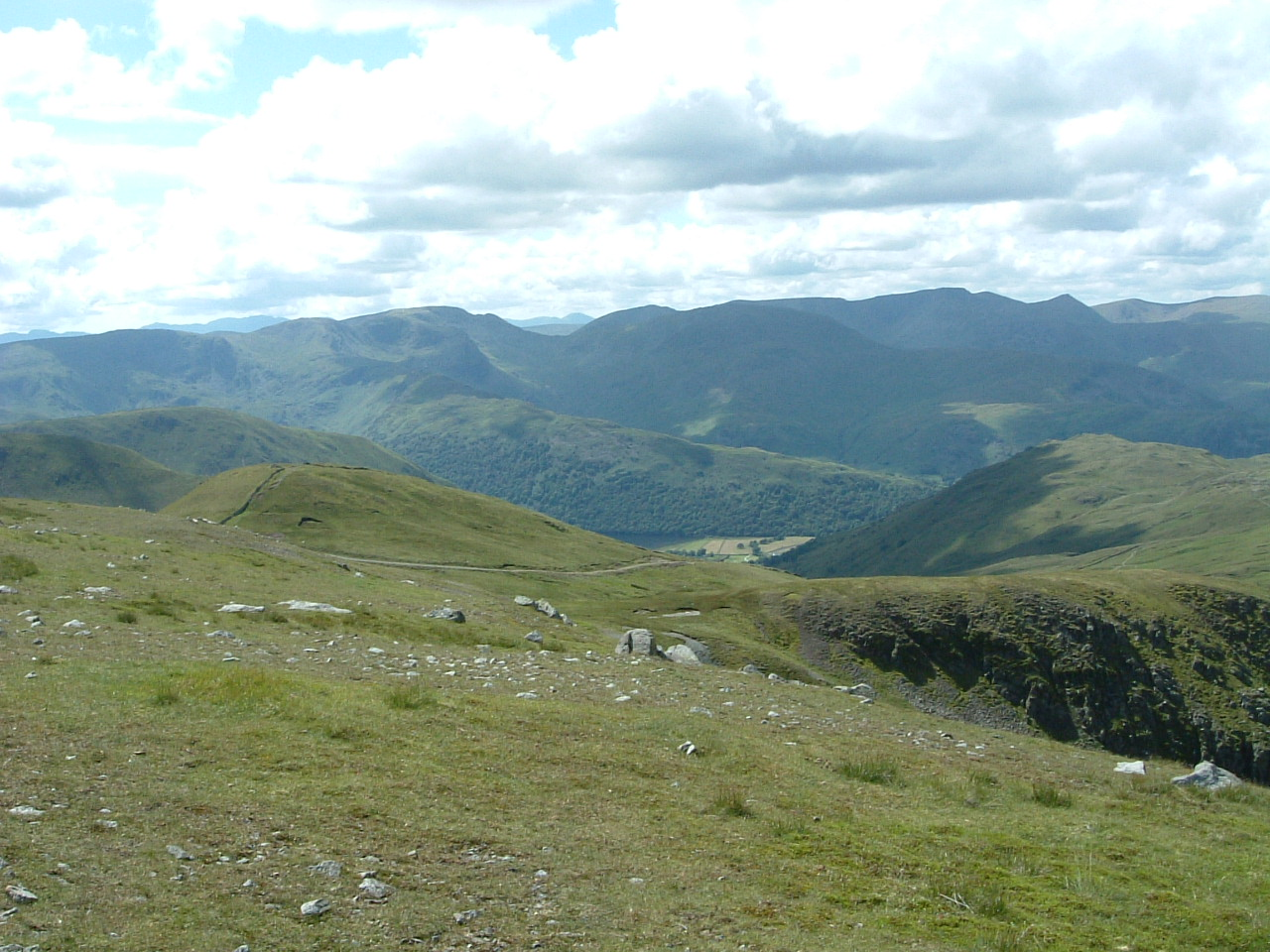
- The Knott from Rampsgill Head. The Knott is the small hump in the left foreground.

Highest point
- Elevation: 739 m (2,425 ft)
- Prominence: c. 14 m
- Parent peak: Rampsgill Head
- Listing: Wainwright
- Coordinates: 54°30′23″N 2°52′21″W

Geography
- Location within the Lake District
- Location: Cumbria, England
- Parent range: Lake District, Far Eastern Fells
- OS grid: NY436127
- Topo map: OS Explorer OL5

The Knott is a fell in the English Lake District, standing above Hayeswater in the Far Eastern Fells. It is an outlier of Rampsgill Head, being the high point of the ridge from there to Rest Dodd.

== Topography ==
The ridge from Rampsgill Head travels north westerly, with The Knott protruding from the south west side. The topography here is unusual, with Well Gill flowing along the top of the broad ridge for nearly half a mile, before finally running down the south western flank as Sulphury Gill.

The small lake of Hayeswater lies below The Knott on this flank, at the bottom of steep scree slopes. A deep gully runs down the fellside from just south of the summit. Viewed from this side The Knott is an impressive conical summit, although its inferiority to Rampsgill Head is apparent from other directions. The north eastern side of the ridge falls over rough ground to the head of Rampsgill in the Martindale catchment.

After passing Sulphury Gill, the ridge continuing from The Knott turns northward to the rounded dome of Rest Dodd.

== Summit ==
The summit is grassy with a small cairn and a ridgeline wall passes within a few yards. The view west is good with all of the 3,000 ft tops in sight. Ullswater can also be seen and Hayeswater and Brothers Water can be brought into view by moving a little to the south west.

== Ascents ==
The usual route of ascent is from Hartsop via Hayeswater. An old zig-zag climbs from just below the tarn although, some walkers have felt a need to cut the corners. A good path leads south from The Knott, via the slopes of Rampsgill Head, to High Street.

== Panorama ==
The following Wainwrights are visible on a clear day (distances in miles):

1. Steel Knotts, 2.6°, 3.4m
2. Bonscale Pike, 11.7°, 4.6m
3. Loadpot Hill, 19.0°, 3.5m
4. High Raise (Martindale), 54.7°, 0.8m
5. Rampsgill Head, 72.5°, 0.4m
6. Harter Fell (Mardale), 145.5°, 2.5m
7. High Street, 162.8°, 1.0m
8. Thornthwaite Crag, 191.7°, 1.7m
9. Stony Cove Pike, 215.4°, 2.0m
10. Gray Crag, 223.6°, 0.8m
11. Red Screes, 225.6°, 3.5m
12. Brim Fell, 229.0°, 13.6m
13. Wetherlam, 231.5°, 11.7m
14. Swirl How, 232.8°, 12.7m
15. Great Carrs, 234.1°, 12.7m
16. Grey Friar, 234.4°, 13.4m
17. High Pike (Rydal), 237.7°, 4.6m
18. Harter Fell (Eskdale), 238.6°, 15.8m
19. Little Hart Crag, 241.2°, 3.5m
20. Cold Pike, 241.7°, 12.2m
21. Pike of Blisco, 242.3°, 11.6m
22. High Hartsop Dodd, 245.6°, 3.0m
23. Crinkle Crags, 246.7°, 12.7m
24. Dove Crag, 249.9°, 4.1m
25. Hartsop Dodd, 251.4°, 1.7m
26. Great Rigg, 253.7°, 5.2m
27. Scafell, 254.2°, 14.8m
28. Esk Pike, 254.8°, 12.9m
29. Scafell Pike, 255.4°, 14.2m
30. Hart Crag, 257.7°, 4.4m
31. Hartsop above How, 262.1°, 3.4m
32. Fairfield, 262.7°, 4.9m
33. Scoat Fell, 266.6°, 17.3m
34. Steeple, 267.2°, 17.4m
35. Ullscarf, 267.3°, 9.1m
36. Pillar, 268.1°, 16.5m
37. Dollywaggon Pike, 271.7°, 5.7m
38. St Sunday Crag, 275.3°, 4.2m
39. Nethermost Pike, 278.6°, 5.9m
40. Helvellyn, 283.9°, 6.1m
41. Birks, 285.7°, 3.7m
42. Catstycam, 288.6°, 5.9m
43. White Side, 291.1°, 6.6m
44. Birkhouse Moor, 293.3°, 5.0m
45. Raise, 295.9°, 6.5m
46. Arnison Crag, 297.0°, 3.1m
47. Brock Crags, 298.6°, 1.3m
48. Stybarrow Dodd, 302.9°, 7.0m
49. Sheffield Pike, 308.3°, 5.4m
50. Great Dodd, 308.8°, 7.7m
51. Glenridding Dodd, 309.9°, 4.6m
52. Skiddaw Little Man, 310.9°, 14.2m
53. Angletarn Pikes, 311.2°, 2.0m
54. Hart Side, 311.4°, 6.5m
55. Skiddaw, 312.2°, 15.0m
56. Bakestall, 315.9°, 15.4m
57. Blencathra, 322.2°, 11.7m
58. Place Fell, 322.6°, 3.3m
59. Bannerdale Crags, 327.4°, 12.0m
60. Bowscale Fell, 329.2°, 12.8m
61. High Pike (Caldbeck), 331.4°, 15.7m
62. Souther Fell, 332.7°, 11.4m
63. Rest Dodd, 334.1°, 0.7m
64. Carrock Fell, 334.8°, 14.3m
65. Gowbarrow Fell, 341.0°, 5.9m
66. Great Mell Fell, 341.7°, 8.3m
67. Beda Fell, 348.9°, 2.8m
68. Little Mell Fell, 352.1°, 7.1m
69. The Nab, 353.0°, 1.6m
70. Hallin Fell, 356.0°, 4.4m
