= Brock Crags =

Fell in the Lake District, Cumbria, England

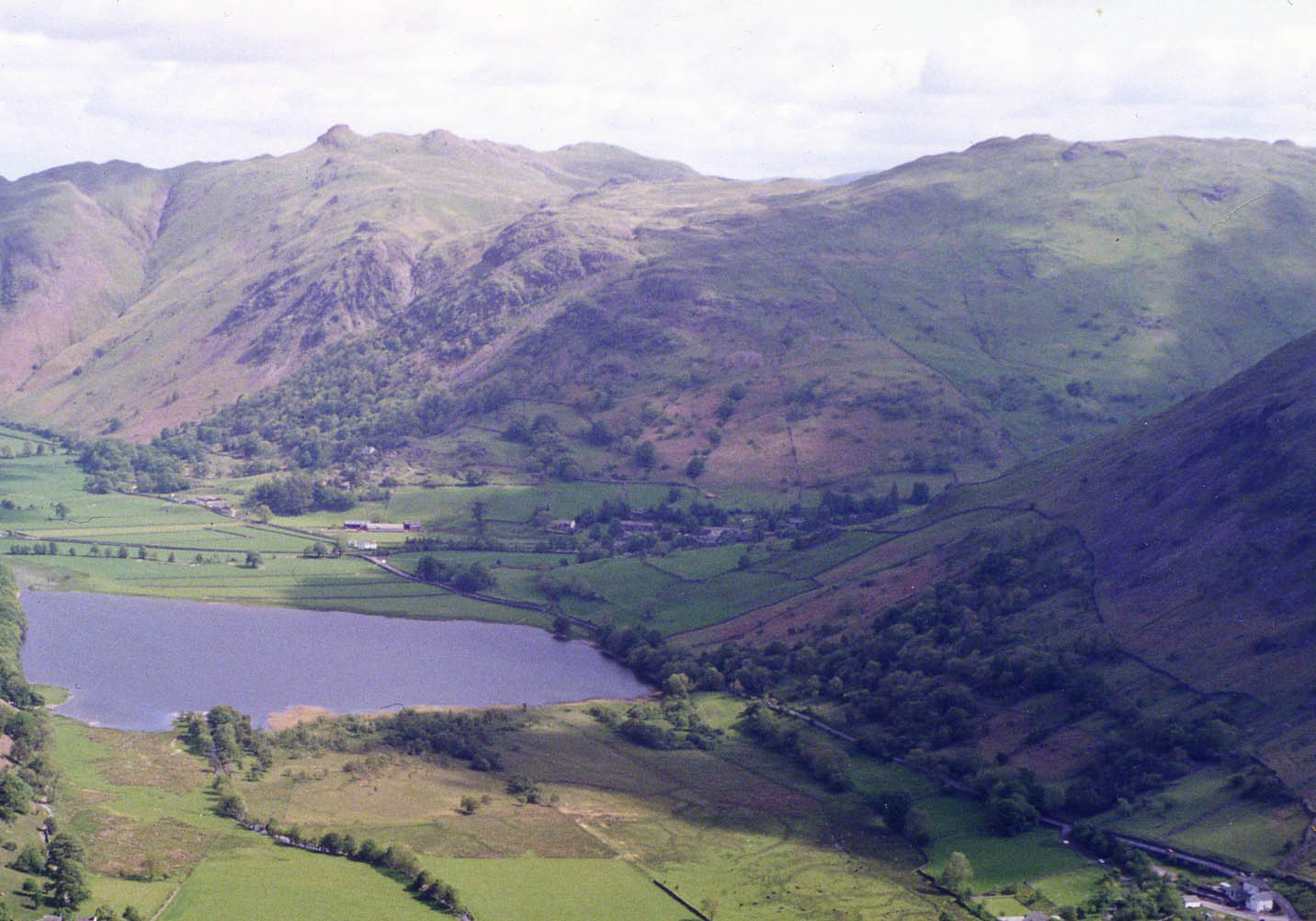
- Brock Crags (right) and Angletarn Crags (left) seen above Brotherswater from High Hartsop Dodd

Highest point
- Elevation: 562 m (1,844 ft)
- Prominence: c. 25 m (80 ft)
- Parent peak: Rest Dodd
- Listing: Wainwright
- Coordinates: 54°30′55″N 2°53′56″W

Geography
- Location within the Lake District
- Location: Cumbria, England
- Parent range: Lake District, Far Eastern Fells
- OS grid: NY419137
- Topo map: OS Explorer OL5

Brock Crags is a fell in the English Lake District, standing above Hartsop in the Far Eastern Fells. It forms part of the perimeter of Martindale, lying on the long ridge from Rampsgill Head to Place Fell.

== Location of summit ==
Wainwright gave the name Brock Crags to the section of ridge between Rest Dodd and Angletarn Pikes, although the summit carrying this name stands to the west of the watershed. A higher unnamed top, 1,870 ft (570 m), was ignored in his Pictorial Guide to the Lakeland Fells, despite standing on the ridge. This is one of the many reasons why Wainwrights differ from more systematic hill lists such as Hewitts or Nuttalls.

== Topography ==
Brock Crags sends out a narrow climbing ridge eastwards to Rest Dodd, having steep ground on both sides. Satura Crag is on the north face, looking down into the head of Bannerdale, while Prison Crag is halfway down the southern flank, above Hayeswater Gill. This stream flows into Goldrill Beck near Hartsop village and then heads northwards for Ullswater. From the true, 1,870 ft (570 m), summit the ridge turns north toward Angletarn Pikes. The picturesque, indented form of Angle Tarn lies just west of the depression between these fells.

Protruding from this angle in the ridge like a swollen elbow is the main body of the fell. It consists of a circular area of high ground about half a mile across, with a number of rocky knolls. Brock Crags itself has two tops, the lower one having the OS spot height. North of here is Cat Crag, 1,645 ft (501 m), an outlier overlooking Angle Tarn, and further subsidiary heights stand above Hartsop at the brink of Lingy Crag.

Below Lingy Crag on the western side there is an area of broadleaved plantation above Goldrill Beck, but the slopes are invariably steep. Angletarn Beck forms the northern boundary of Brock Crags, as it cuts through the parapet between Cat Crag and its parent fell to run through a gully to Goldrill Beck. The steeply gouged head of Bannerdale, including Buck Crags below the 1,870 ft summit, forms the northeastern flank of the fell, the inside of the 'elbow'.

== Summit ==
The summit has a small tarn between the two highest knolls and gives a fine all-round view. A short and simple ascent can be made from Hartsop, although the upper section has no clear path.

== Ascents ==
The main walkers' route from Patterdale to High Street is a clear path running along the ridge and passing just below the true summit.
