= The Nab =

Fell in the Lake District, Cumbria, England

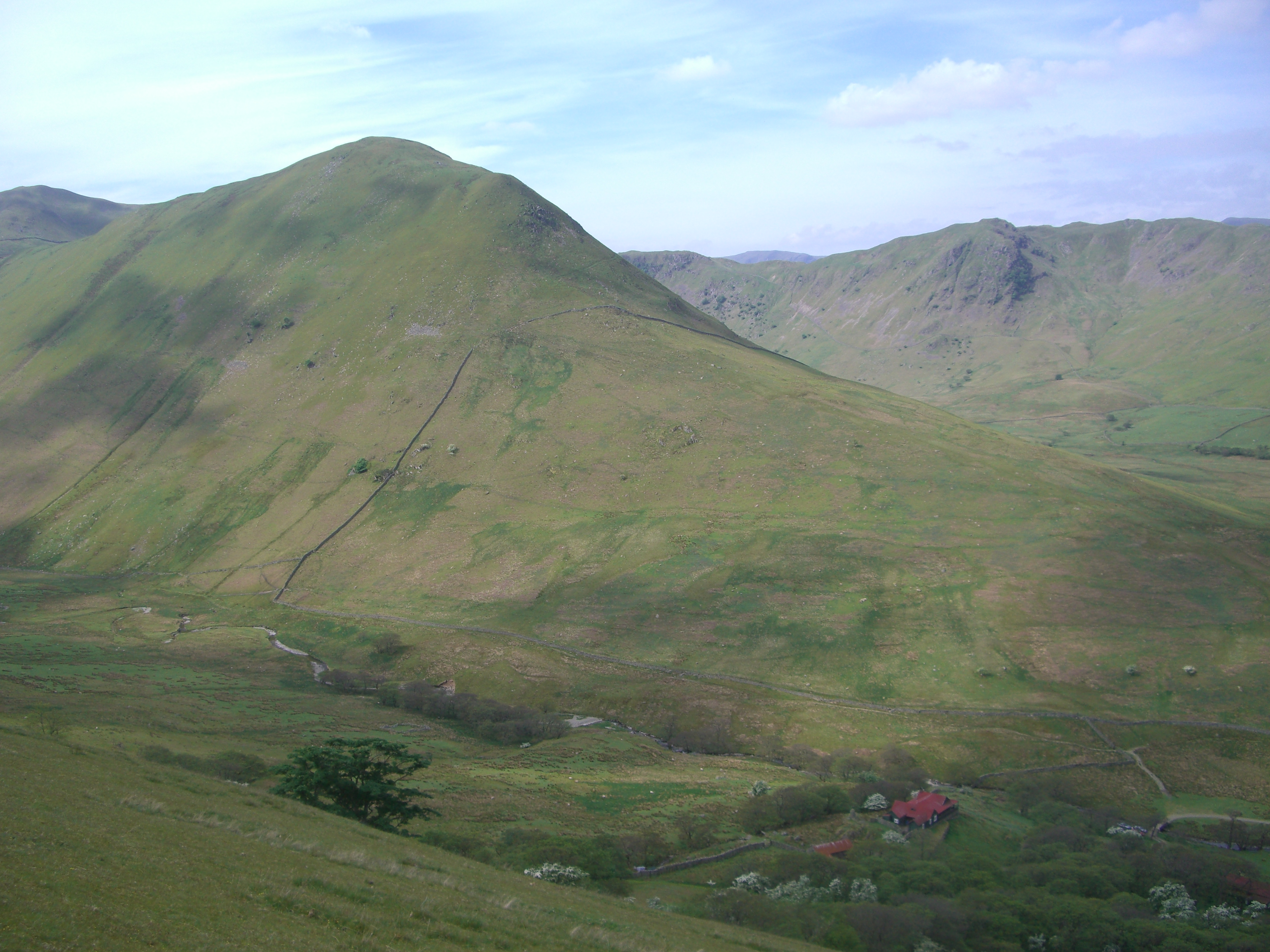
- Seen from Martindale on the lower slopes of Wether Hill. "The Bungalow" is visible in the valley.

Highest point
- Elevation: 576 m (1,890 ft)
- Prominence: 61 m (200 ft)
- Parent peak: Rest Dodd
- Listing: Wainwright
- Coordinates: 54°31′44″N 2°52′34″W

Geography
- Location within the Lake District
- Location: Cumbria, England
- Parent range: Lake District, Far Eastern Fells
- OS grid: NY434152
- Topo map: OS Explorer OL5

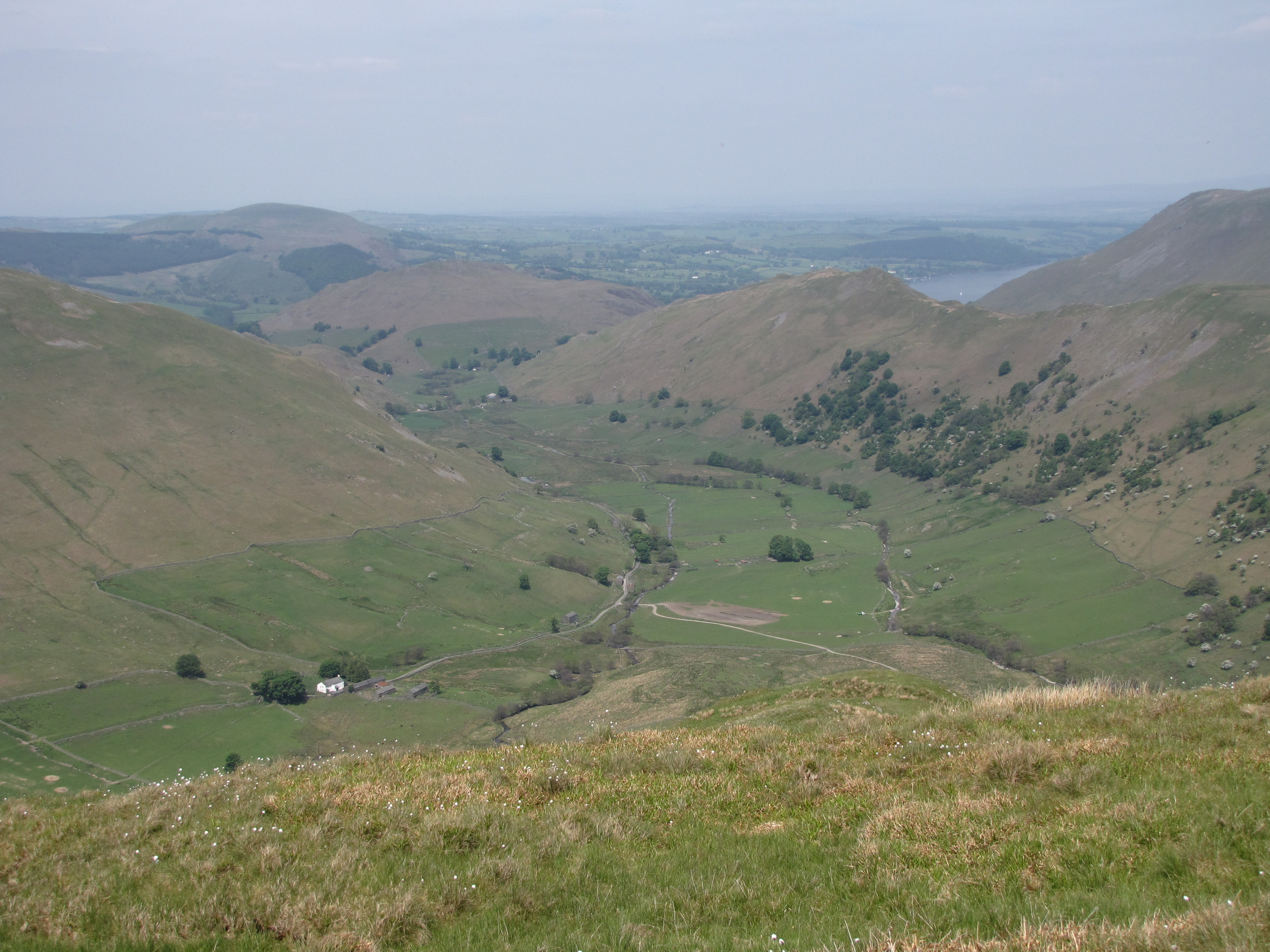
Looking down into Martindale from the summit of The Nab.

The Nab is a fell in the English Lake District. It has a moderate height of 576 metres (1,890 feet), and lies in the quieter eastern high ground between Ullswater and Haweswater Reservoir. The Nab is included in Alfred Wainwright's list of Lakeland fells and many walkers feel compelled to climb it to complete their list of 'Wainwrights' even though it is not a significant fell and is awkward to reach.

== Topography ==
The Nab is a top on the northern ridge of Rest Dodd, one of the horseshoe of fells surrounding the Martindale catchment. It divides the valleys of Bannerdale and Rampsgill, which meet below the nose of the ridge to form How Grain. The sides of the ridge are steep and rough, but the top is broad and level. It is scarred by peat hags, some deeper than a man.

== Access and history ==
When Alfred Wainwright wrote his pictorial guide to the Far Eastern Fells in the 1950s The Nab, as part of the Martindale Deer Forest was strictly out of bounds. He wrote in the chapter on The Nab:

Keep Out notices, barricaded gates and miles of barbed wire must convey the impression even to the dullest witted walker that there is no welcome here

The Nab is open access under the Countryside and Rights of Way Act 2000 although this is part of the red deer conservation area and this fell is a sanctuary for the animals away from people. Walks here should be avoided particularly during the calving season between May and mid-June. Further advice should be sought from Dalemain Estate to see if walking is possible. Access to the summit is from Dalehead Farm and past Angle Tarn. It is not possible to go through the fields below to the north east of the fell.

Anybody approaching from the north will see 'The Bungalow' in Martindale which was formerly a shooting lodge built in 1910 by the Earl of Lonsdale for the visiting Kaiser Wilhelm and is now a holiday cottage available to rent.

A report from the Department for Environment, Food and Rural Affairs found that Martindale deer may be the only pure blooded Red Deer left in England as many herds become cross bred with genes from the Sika Deer.

== Summit ==
The grassy dome of the summit is marked by a small cairn. Although the view is obstructed by higher ground southward there is an end to end view of the Helvellyn range above Angletarn Pikes.

== Ascents ==
The route from Martindale to the summit follows a well engineered stalkers path which zig-zags up the fell and avoids any difficulties by-passing the crags of Nab End just below the summit.

Most walkers who reach the summit of The Nab do not cross the Dalemain Estate and avoid Martindale altogether, attaining the highest point by approaching and leaving along the boggy ridge which links with the neighbouring fell of Rest Dodd. This route has the added attraction of seeing the herds of Red deer on the open fell. The main starting point for this ascent of The Nab is Hartsop village in Patterdale, just off the A592 main road, where there is a large car park; this circular walk also passes through the 'Wainwright fells' of Brock Crags, Rest Dodd and Angletarn Pikes before descending back to Hartsop.
