= Hayeswater =

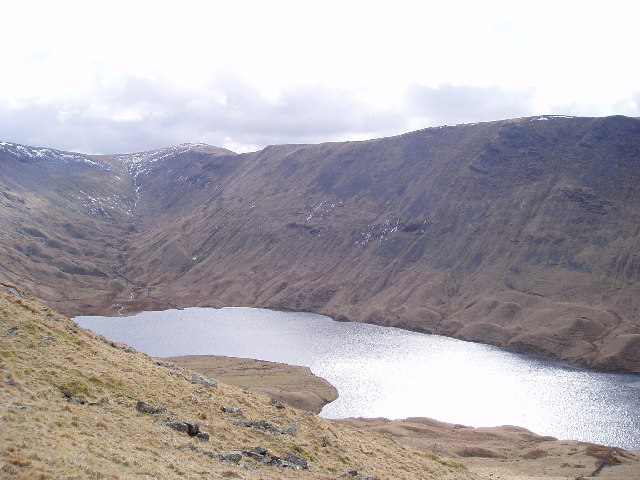

- Location in the Lake District National Park Location in Eden, Cumbria
- Location: Lake District, Cumbria
- Coordinates: 54°30′05″N 2°52′48″W
- Type: natural (formerly reservoir)
- Primary inflows: Hayeswater Gill
- Basin countries: United Kingdom
- Surface elevation: 1,400 ft (430 m)

Hayeswater is a small lake within the Lake District of Cumbria, England.

The lake is situated about a mile (1.6 km) SE of the hamlet of Hartsop in the Patterdale Valley. It nestles between The Knott to its east and Gray Crag to the west and it is at an altitude of almost 1,400 feet (425 m). The lake is natural but was dammed in 1908 to provide a reservoir serving the Cumbrian town of Penrith. It is fed from the south by Hayeswater Gill, which rises close to the route of the Roman High Street and continues to Cow Bridge where it joins the outlet stream from Brothers Water.

It had not been used as a reservoir since 2005 and United Utilities removed the dam and restored it to a mountain tarn in the summer of 2014. A new footbridge over Hayeswater Beck was also constructed 250 yards downstream from the tarn outlet channel.

Hayeswater Tarn is also a popular yet remote destination for adventurous anglers and fly fishermen and women, with the tarn holding a good number of native wild brown trout. Tadpoles, caddis and olives are prolific and make up a big part of the trout`s diet. On occasion osprey can be seen over the tarn.
