= Cardale =

Cardale may refer to:

- Cardale (surname), a surname
- Cardale, Manitoba, a village in Canada
- Cardale Babington (1808–1895), English botanist
- Cardale Jones (born 1992), American football quarterback

== See also ==
- Cardal (disambiguation)
- Caudale
