= Kidsty Pike =

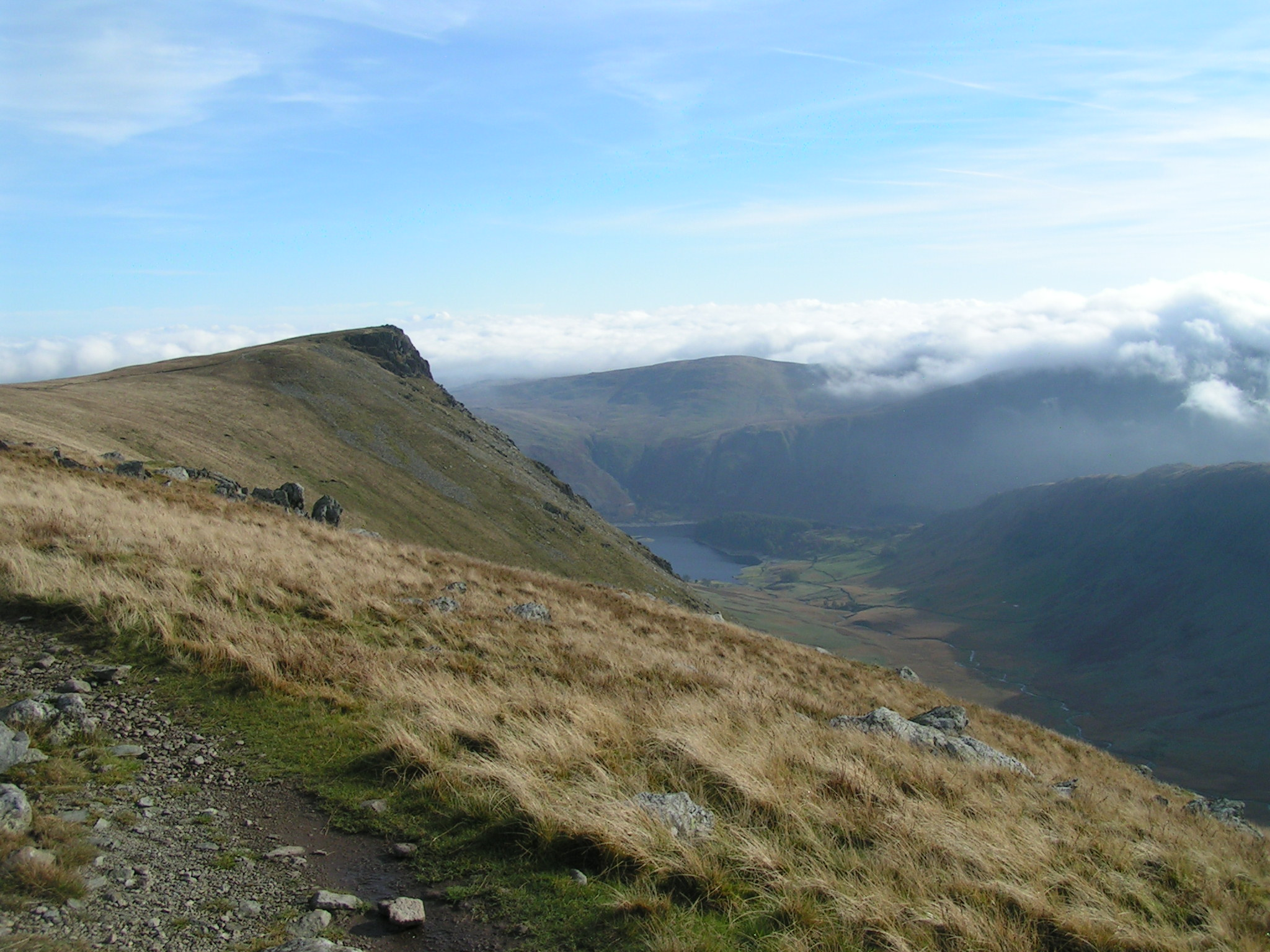
- Kidsty Pike from the west

Highest point
- Elevation: 780 m (2,560 ft)
- Prominence: c. 15 m
- Parent peak: Rampsgill Head
- Listing: Wainwright, Nuttall
- Coordinates: 54°30′20″N 2°51′20″W

Geography
- Location within the Lake District
- Location: Cumbria, England
- Parent range: Lake District, Far Eastern Fells
- OS grid: NY447126
- Topo map: OS Explorer OL5

Kidsty Pike is a fell in the English Lake District, standing to the west of Haweswater Reservoir. It is a subsidiary top of Rampsgill Head, but has long achieved the status of a separate fell, thanks to its classic peaked profile. Wainwright followed this convention in his Pictorial Guide to the Lakeland Fells.

== Topography ==
Two valleys run up westwards from Haweswater, above what was the village of Mardale Green before the raising of the lake. Riggindale is the southern arm and runs straight with a classic U-shaped profile. Randale starts north-westerly, rising quickly before turning due west above approximately 1,800 feet (550 m). Between these valleys is Kidsty Pike, the east ridge of Rampsgill Head.

The northern flank falls at a shallow gradient over grass to the high gathering grounds of Randale. In contrast, the southern side of the ridge drops over crag and scree to Riggindale, 1,500 feet (460 m) below. The difference in slopes gives Kidsty Pike its appeal when viewed from Haweswater, or (for example) on the M6 motorway near Shap. From here, in profile the summit appears as an acute angled peak.

Rampsgill Head is only a short distance away, but eastwards the ridge continues for about a mile, dropping gently to Kidsty Howes above the lake. This rocky outcrop marks the final steep descent to the shore.

== Ascents ==
The only direct route of ascent is from the road end at Mardale Head. The lakeshore is followed to the ruins of Riggindale Farm. Like the other houses in the valley, this was blown up by the Army as demolition practice while the waters rose. From here, the old path up the ridge can be followed via Kidsty Howes.

== Summit ==
The summit has a small cairn on grass, immediately above the Riggindale face. The higher fells of the High Street range obscure much of the view, although a section of Lakeland is visible across the Straits of Riggindale.

== Panorama ==
The following Wainwrights are visible on a clear day from the highest point of the fell (distances in miles):

1. High Raise (Martindale), 4.6°, 0.5m
2. Selside Pike, 107.5°, 2.8m
3. Branstree, 129.4°, 2.5m
4. Grey Crag, 136.5°, 4.5m
5. Tarn Crag (Longsleddale), 138.7°, 3.9m
6. Harter Fell (Mardale), 158.8°, 2.2m
7. Mardale Ill Bell, 178.7°, 1.5m
8. High Street, 201.6°, 1.9m
9. Stony Cove Pike, 228.5°, 2.4m
10. Old Man of Coniston, 229.2°, 14.3m
11. Brim Fell, 230.9°, 14.0m
12. Red Screes, 232.7°, 4.0m
13. Swirl How, 234.7°, 13.2m
14. Great Carrs, 235.9°, 13.1m
15. Grey Friar, 236.2°, 13.9m
16. Harter Fell (Eskdale), 239.9°, 16.3m
17. Lingmoor Fell, 240.4°, 10.3m
18. High Pike (Rydal), 242.1°, 5.1m
19. Cold Pike, 243.3°, 12.8m
20. Pike of Blisco, 243.9°, 12.1m
21. Gray Crag, 245.5°, 1.3m
22. Little Hart Crag, 246.3°, 4.1m
23. Crinkle Crags, 248.1°, 13.2m
24. Bowfell, 252.5°, 13.2m
25. Dove Crag, 253.3°, 4.7m
26. Scafell, 255.1°, 15.4m
27. Esk Pike, 255.8°, 13.5m
28. Great Rigg, 256.0°, 5.8m
29. Scafell Pike, 256.3°, 14.8m
30. Great End, 258.6°, 14.0m
31. Hart Crag, 259.9°, 5.0m
32. Fairfield, 264.1°, 5.6m
33. Scoat Fell, 266.9°, 17.9m
34. Steeple, 267.5°, 18.0m
35. Pillar, 268.4°, 17.2m
36. Dollywaggon Pike, 272.0°, 6.3m
37. Helvellyn, 283.0°, 6.8m
38. Rampsgill Head, 305.8°, 0.3m
39. Blencathra, 320.0°, 12.2m
40. Knott, 322.7°, 15.8m
41. Bannerdale Crags, 325.1°, 12.4m
42. Bowscale Fell, 326.9°, 13.2m
43. High Pike (Caldbeck), 329.5°, 16.1m
44. Souther Fell, 330.1°, 11.8m
45. Carrock Fell, 332.7°, 14.7m
46. Gowbarrow Fell, 335.6°, 6.2m
47. The Nab, 338.0°, 1.6m
48. Great Mell Fell, 337.7°, 8.5m
