= Stony Cove Pike =

Mountain in the English Lake District, Cumbria, England

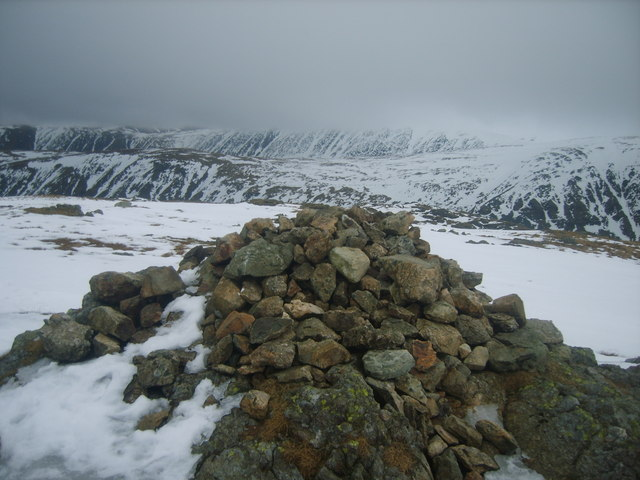
- Cairn on Stony Cove Pike

Highest point
- Elevation: 763 m (2,503 ft)
- Prominence: 171 m (561 ft)
- Parent peak: High Street
- Listing: Marilyn, Hewitt, Wainwright, Nuttall
- Coordinates: 54°28′55″N 2°54′05″W

Geography
- Location within the Lake District
- Location: Cumbria, England
- Parent range: Lake District, Far Eastern Fells
- OS grid: NY417100
- Topo map: OS Explorer OL5, Explorer OL7

Stony Cove Pike (alternatively known as Caudale Moor /kʊərdeɪl mʊər/ or John Bell's Banner) is a fell in the Far Eastern part of the English Lake District. It stands on the other side of the Kirkstone Pass from Red Screes, and is on the end of a ridge coming down from High Street. It is separated from its neighbours by the deep col of Threshthwaite Mouth, so is a Marilyn (a hill with topographic prominence of at least 150m) – the sixteenth highest in the Lake District.

== Name ==
There is considerable variation over use of the alternative names for the fell. The Ordnance Survey maps name the main summit as 'Stony Cove Pike', the second top to the west as 'Caudale Moor' and 'John Bell's Banner' is reserved for the south west ridge descending to St Raven's Edge. Alfred Wainwright in his Pictorial Guide to the Lakeland Fells uses Caudale Moor for the fell as a whole, John Bell's Banner as an alternative to this and Stony Cove Pike as a name for the (main) summit. Bill Birkett prefers the Ordnance Survey scheme, but with John Bell's Banner as a second name for the subsidiary top.

== Topography ==
The fell is wide and sprawling, with six ridges leaving the summit area. The main summit sprouts four to the points of the compass. Eastward is the rocky descent to Threshwaite Mouth, followed by an equally steep climb to Thornthwaite Crag. Northward is the grassy ridge to Hartsop Dodd and westward the plateau narrows slightly toward the second top of Caudale Moor/ John Bell's Banner (2,477 feet; 755 m). To the south of the main top a short spur juts out into the head of the Trout Beck valley, before falling steeps over Doup Crag.

From the lower top the narrow descending ridge of Rough Edge drops north west toward Caudale Bridge. The extensive Caudale Quarry is hollowed out about halfway down the edge, reached by what was once believed to be the steepest working track in Lakeland. There is also evidence of deeper mining here.

A broad ridge also descends south from the Caudale Moor top. This passes over Pike How before dividing around the head of Woundale. The south western branch descends down St Raven's Edge to the Kirkstone Pass road at Woundale Raise, before climbing again to Wansfell. The south eastern spur is much shorter, dropping over Hart Crag and Great Knott into the Troutbeck valley.

== Summit ==
The summit area is grassy, with a number of small tarns between the two tops. Walls follow the ridges to Hartsop Dodd, St Raven's Edge and Threshthwaite Mouth, making navigation of the complex ridge system easier. Both tops have cairns and there is a further cairn topped by a wooden cross to the south west of Caudale Moor. This is named Mark Atkinson's monument by Wainwright. Despite the somewhat dreary nature of the top, considerable areas of crag surround the plateau. Caudale Head between the northern ridges is one, and more crag lies north and south of Threshthwaite Mouth at the heads of Pasture and Trout Becks. The flatness of the top leads to a somewhat restricted view of the surrounding fells, although all of the major groups are in sight from the summit.

== Ascents ==
The most common way of ascent is to make a small circuit from the Patterdale valley, going up the steep north ridge to the top, then across Threshthwaite Mouth and up to Thornthwaite Crag. From there the circuit is completed via Thornthwaite Crag's north ridge, known as Gray Crag.

The southern ridge from Wansfell and Ambleside provides a longer alternative route of ascent. The quickest way up is from the top of Kirkstone Pass via St Raven's Edge: this route was described by Alfred Wainwright as the "dullest way up".
