= Rest Dodd =

Fell in the Lake District, Cumbria, England

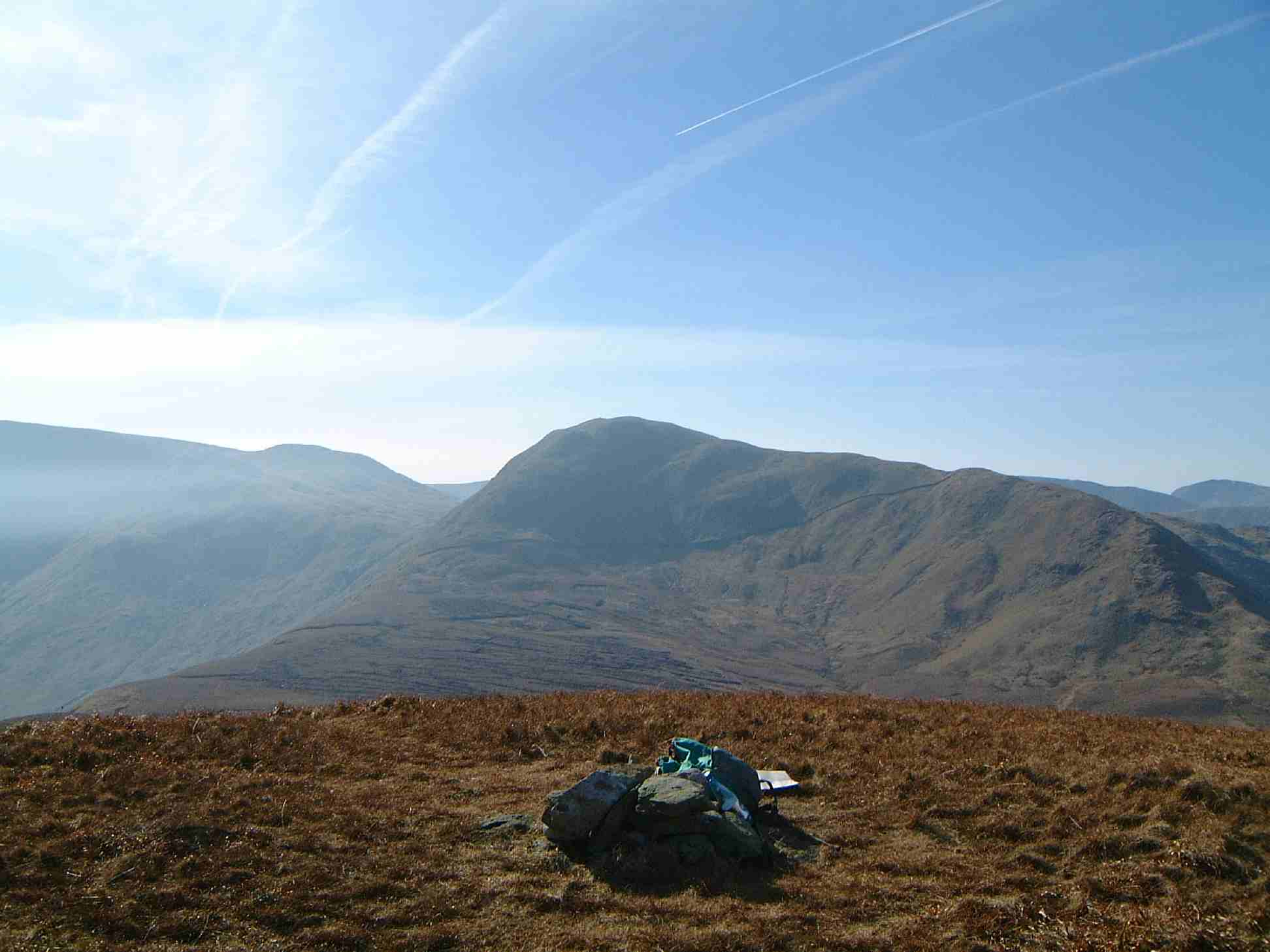
- Rest Dodd seen from The Nab

Highest point
- Elevation: 696 m (2,283 ft)
- Prominence: 111 m (364 ft)
- Parent peak: High Street
- Listing: Hewitt, Wainwright, Nuttall
- Coordinates: 54°30′55″N 2°52′44″W

Geography
- Location within the Lake District
- Location: Cumbria, England
- Parent range: Lake District, Far Eastern Fells
- OS grid: NY432137
- Topo map: OS Explorer OL5

Rest Dodd is a fell in the English Lake District. It is situated in the quieter far eastern region of the national park and reaches a height of 696 metres (2,283 ft). Rest Dodd is a fell that is often by-passed by walkers as they travel the busy footpath between Ullswater and Haweswater either to climb the more significant fell of High Street or strive to complete Alfred Wainwright’s Coast to Coast Walk. Wainwright describes Rest Dodd as “A fell of little interest although the east flank falls spectacularly in fans of colourful scree”. The fell is usually climbed in conjunction with other nearby "Wainwright" fells such as The Nab, Brock Crags and Angletarn Pikes.

== Topography ==
Rest Dodd stands on the long ridge forming the boundary of the Martindale catchment, an extensive valley system emptying north into Ullswater. South east of Rest Dodd is The Knott and in the opposite direction is Brock Crags. A subsidiary ridge juts out north from Rest Dodd, ending at The Nab. This fell separates the heads of the Martindale valleys of Bannerdale and Rampsgill. A much shorter rocky spur also runs north west from Rest Dodd, divided from the Nab by Yewgrove Gill. The southern flank of the fell is formed by Hayeswater Gill.

Rest Dodd appears as a high, rounded dome from most directions, the upper slopes being clad in rough grass. Below about 1,500 feet (500 m) all of the faces are steep and rough, with some outcropping on the Martindale flanks. The ridge connecting to The Knott is broad topped and marshy, whilst that connecting to Brock Crags crosses a series of rocky outcrops as it narrows above Satura Crag. The way to the Nab, once the boundary wall of the deer forest is passed, is crossed by extensive peat hags. Many of these are deeper than the height of a man and add considerably to the time required.

== Ascents ==
The ascent of Rest Dodd is usually started from the valley of Patterdale where there are two possible starting points: the village of Hartsop gives the most advantageous start being just two miles (3.2 km) from the fell summit but it is a tough climb from Hayeswater Gill to join the main path from Patterdale village to Haweswater. The other route is longer, 3 1/2 miles (5.6 km), and starts in Patterdale village and utilises the main path over Boredale Hause and past Angle Tarn before following an old stone wall which leads unerringly to Rest Dodd's summit.

== Summit ==
The summit of the fell has two cairns due to the proximity of quite a few old stone walls and gives full length views of the Helvellyn range to the west as well as of the Ramps Gill valley to the north.

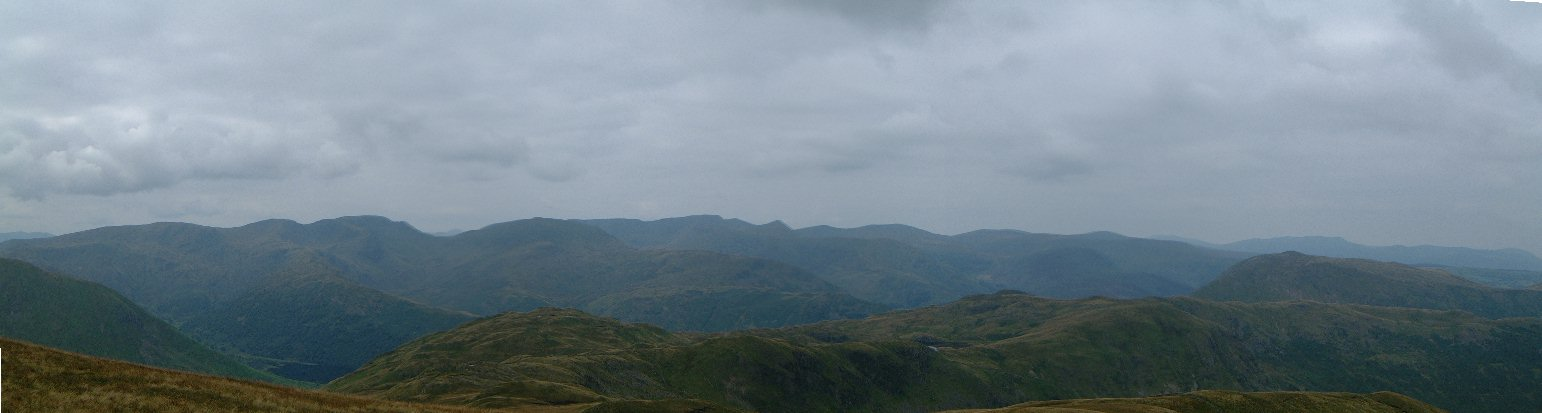
The view westerly from Rest Dodd has the Helvellyn range in the background while Place Fell, Angletarn Pikes and Brock Crags are in the foreground.
