= Cardle =

Cardle is a surname. Notable people with the surname include:

- Joe Cardle (born 1987), English footballer
- Matt Cardle (born 1983), English singer and songwriter
- Scott Cardle (born 1989), British boxer

== See also ==
- Cardale (surname)
- Carole
