= Cardal =

Cardal may refer to:

- Cardal, Uruguay, a town
- Cardal Publishing, a British magazine and comic publisher
- Jaroslav Cardal (1919–2010), Czech cross-country skier

== See also ==
- Cardale (disambiguation)
- Caudal (disambiguation)
- Kardal
