= Blea Water =

Mountain lake in Cumbria, England

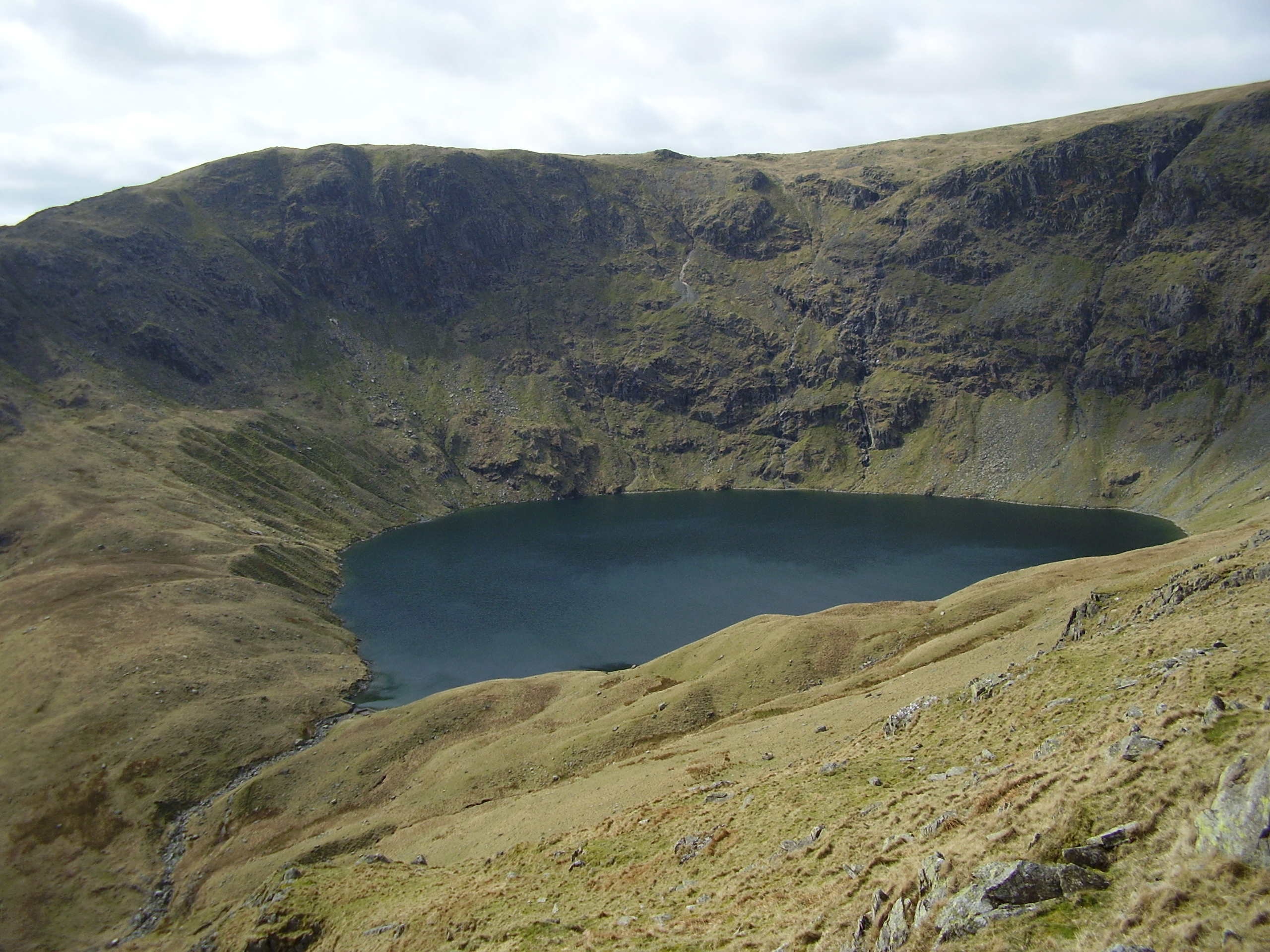
- Blea Water viewed from above

- Location in the Lake District National Park Location in Eden, Cumbria
- Location: England
- Coordinates: 54°29′20″N 2°51′10″W
- Type: glacial lake
- Basin countries: United Kingdom
- Max. depth: 206 ft (63 m)
- Surface elevation: 1,550 ft (470 m) approx.

Blea Water is a tarn or corrie lake which occupies a glacially excavated hollow immediately to the east of High Street in the Lake District, England. At just over 200 feet (61 m) deep, it is the deepest tarn in the Lake District.

It is drained by the Mardale Beck, which runs north-east into Haweswater.

== Protected Area ==
Blea Water was designated as a Site of Special Scientific Interest SSSI in 1985 because the nutrient-poor lake supports plants including water-starwort (Callitriche hamulata), shoreweed (Littorella uniflora) and algae including stonewort (Nitella flexilis).

Part of the land area that is designated as Blea Water SSSI is owned by United Utilities.

== See also ==
- Blea Tarn (Langdale)
- Wast Water, the deepest lake in the Lake District.
