= Hartsop Dodd =

Mountain in Cumbria, England

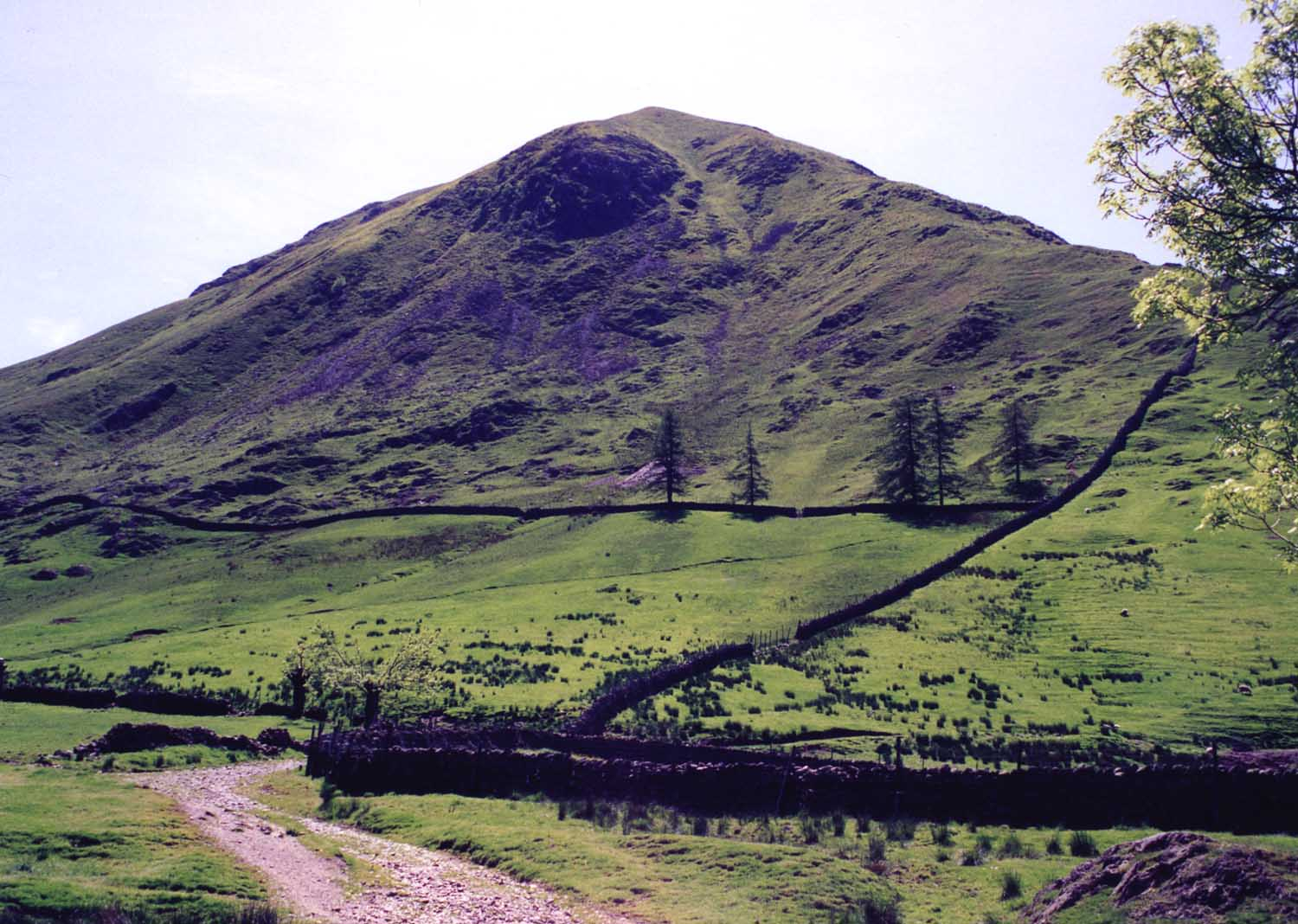
- Hartsop Dodd from Hartsop village

Highest point
- Elevation: 618 m (2,028 ft)
- Prominence: c. 20 m (66 ft)
- Parent peak: Stony Cove Pike
- Listing: Wainwright, Nuttall,
- Coordinates: 54°29′53″N 2°54′34″W

Geography
- Location within the Lake District
- Location: Cumbria, England
- Parent range: Lake District, Far Eastern Fells
- OS grid: NY412118
- Topo map: OS Explorer OL5

Hartsop Dodd is a fell in the English Lake District, standing to the south east of Brothers Water. It is a subsidiary top on the north ridge of Caudale Moor, but was given separate fell status by Wainwright in his Pictorial Guide to the Lakeland Fells. That convention is followed here.

== Topography ==
A broad grassy ridge descends gently from Caudale Moor, running north from the summit plateau and topped by a stone wall. After about half a mile it narrows considerably and turns north-west for the same distance again. Finally it throws up a small grassy dome which is the summit of Hartsop Dodd. After this the ridge drops quickly to valley level between Hartsop village and Brothers Water.

The western flank of the ridge stands above the high valley of Caudale, which is a feeder of Kirkstone Beck and Brothers Water. On the eastern side is Pasture Bottom, the valley of Pasture Beck. This stream joins the outflow of Brothers Water near Hartsop. At the point where the ridge narrows and turns, a short spur is thrown out on the eastern side. The ends abruptly in Raven Crag.

From Hartsop, looking straight up the nose of the ridge, Hartsop Dodd appears to be an independent fell — a steep-sided, symmetrical, bell-shaped peak of considerable height. From elsewhere it can be seen for what it is, an offshoot of the higher Caudale Moor.

== Summit ==
The summit is crossed by the stone wall, a timber post marking the high point. Many of the eastern and far eastern fells are in view with Dovedale particularly impressive.

== Ascents ==
Ascent is made up the ridge from Hartsop or via one of the grooved paths on the western side of the ridge.

== Mining history ==
There are old mineworkings on the nose of the ridge above Hartsop. These are the remains of Low Hartsop Mine, also called Myers Head Mine. This was worked for lead between 1867 and 1870, but proved a commercial failure.
