= Far Eastern Fells =

Region of the Cumbrian Mountains

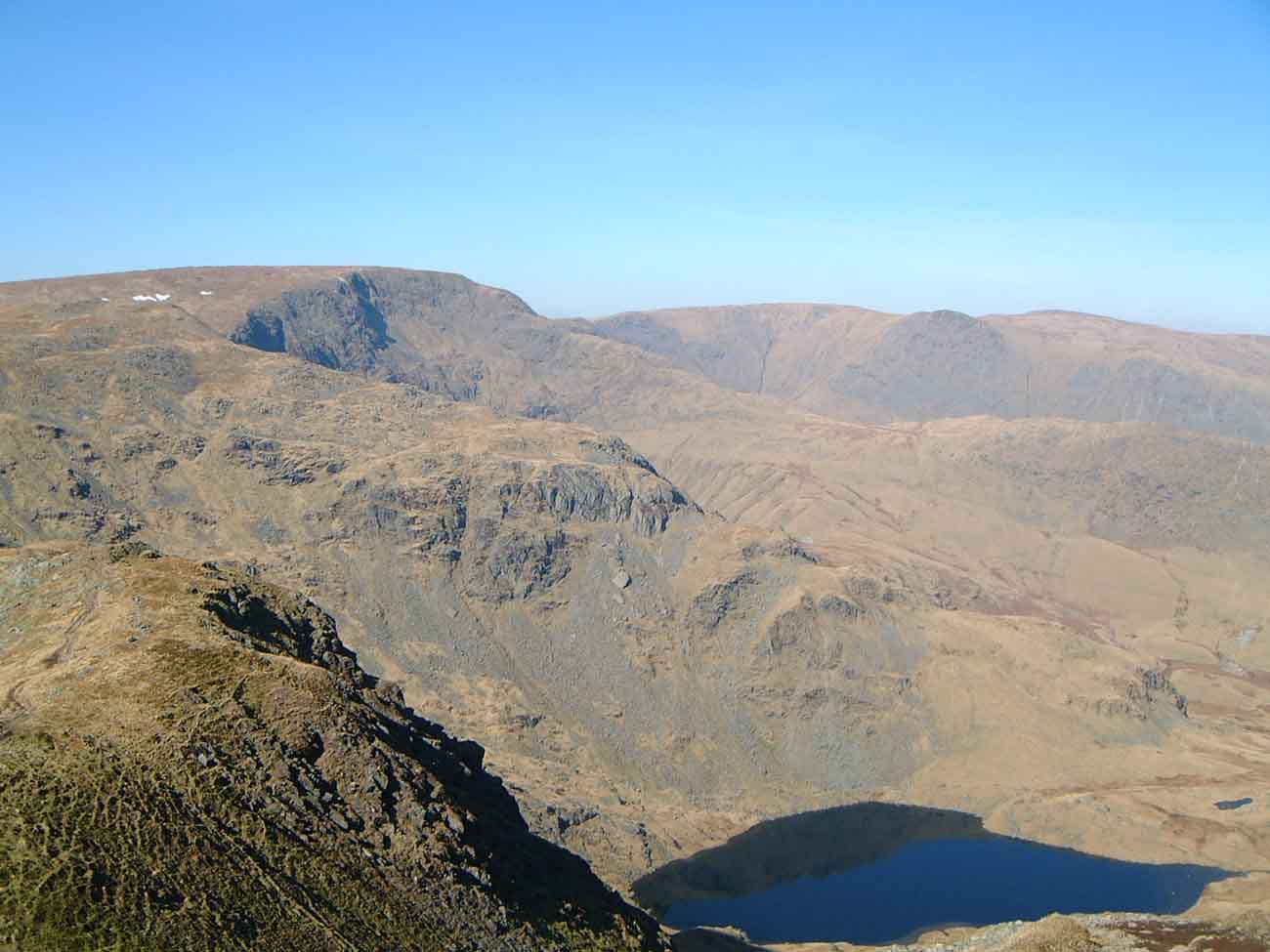
High Street from Harter Fell

The Far Eastern Fells are a part of the Cumbrian Mountains in the Lake District of England. Reaching their highest point at High Street (828 metres or 2.718 ft.), they occupy a broad area to the east of Ullswater and Kirkstone Pass. Much quieter than the central areas of Lakeland they offer in general easier walking as the fells merge mainly into the surrounding moorlands.

== Partition of the Lakeland Fells ==
The Lake District is a National Park in the north-west of the country which – in addition to its lakes – features a complex range of hills. These are locally known as fells and range from low hills to the highest ground in England. Hundreds of tops exist and many writers have attempted to draw up definitive lists. In doing so the compilers frequently divide the range into smaller areas to aid their description.

The most influential of all such authors was Alfred Wainwright, whose Pictorial Guide to the Lakeland Fells series has sold in excess of 2 million copies, being in print continuously since the first volume was published in 1952. Wainwright divided the fells into seven geographical areas, each surrounded by valleys and low passes. While any such division must be arbitrary — and later writers have deviated to a greater or lesser extent from this blueprint — Wainwright's sevenfold division remains the best known partitioning of the fells into 'sub ranges', each with its own characteristics. The Far Eastern Fells are one of these divisions, covered by volume 2 of Wainwright's work.

== Boundaries ==
The Far Eastern Fells occupy the region east of the A592 Kirkstone Pass road. This runs north from Ambleside to Patterdale at the head of Ullswater. The western perimeter then continues down the length of the lake to Pooley Bridge. Wainwright's outer boundary was more arbitrary since he chose not to mirror the edge of the National Park as he was "concerned only with the high ground". He determined instead upon straight lines connecting the outer limits of Ullswater and Haweswater, the proposed (and never built) Swindale Reservoir and Windermere. He extended this area slightly by stretching the boundary out to Longsleddale church, thus bringing in Tarn Crag and Grey Crag, the most easterly 2,000 footers. Wainwright thus excluded the high moorland falling eastward to the M6 Motorway, although later writers such as Birkett have included everything to the park boundary.

== Topography ==
The higher section of the Far Eastern Fells can best be thought of as a part of the great horseshoe of fells surrounding the Ullswater catchment, continuing on from the main spine of the Eastern Fells on the other side of Kirkstone. First, directly above the Inn at the summit of the pass, is Stony Cove Pike, known to devotees of Wainwright by its alternative name of Caudale Moor. Swinging gradually northward the ridge continues over Thornthwaite Crag, High Street, Rampsgill Head and High Raise. The western, Ullswater, side of the ridge is characterised by the steep U-shaped valleys of Martindale running north to the lake, rough grass, heather and bracken being the principal terrain. On the eastern flanks are deep corries, sharp ridges and a great deal of exposed rock, looking down on the Haweswater Reservoir. North of High Raise the ridge descends gradually northward, gradually assuming a moorland character as it passes over Wether Hill and Loadpot Hill before petering out altogether near Pooley Bridge. Only above the shore of Ullswater does a trace of Lakeland remain, with the steep faces of Arthur's Pike and Bonscale Pike looming over the lake.

The complex valley system of Martindale lies on the western side of the main ridge, the dales divided by ridges that fan out from Rampsgill Head. Here the walker will find The Knott and Rest Dodd falling from the higher ground, beyond which are The Nab, Brock Crags and Beda Fell. Completing the group above Patterdale are Angletarn Pikes with its indented tarn and Place Fell. Steel Knotts and Hallin Fell also rise to the west of the main range, satellites of Wether Hill.

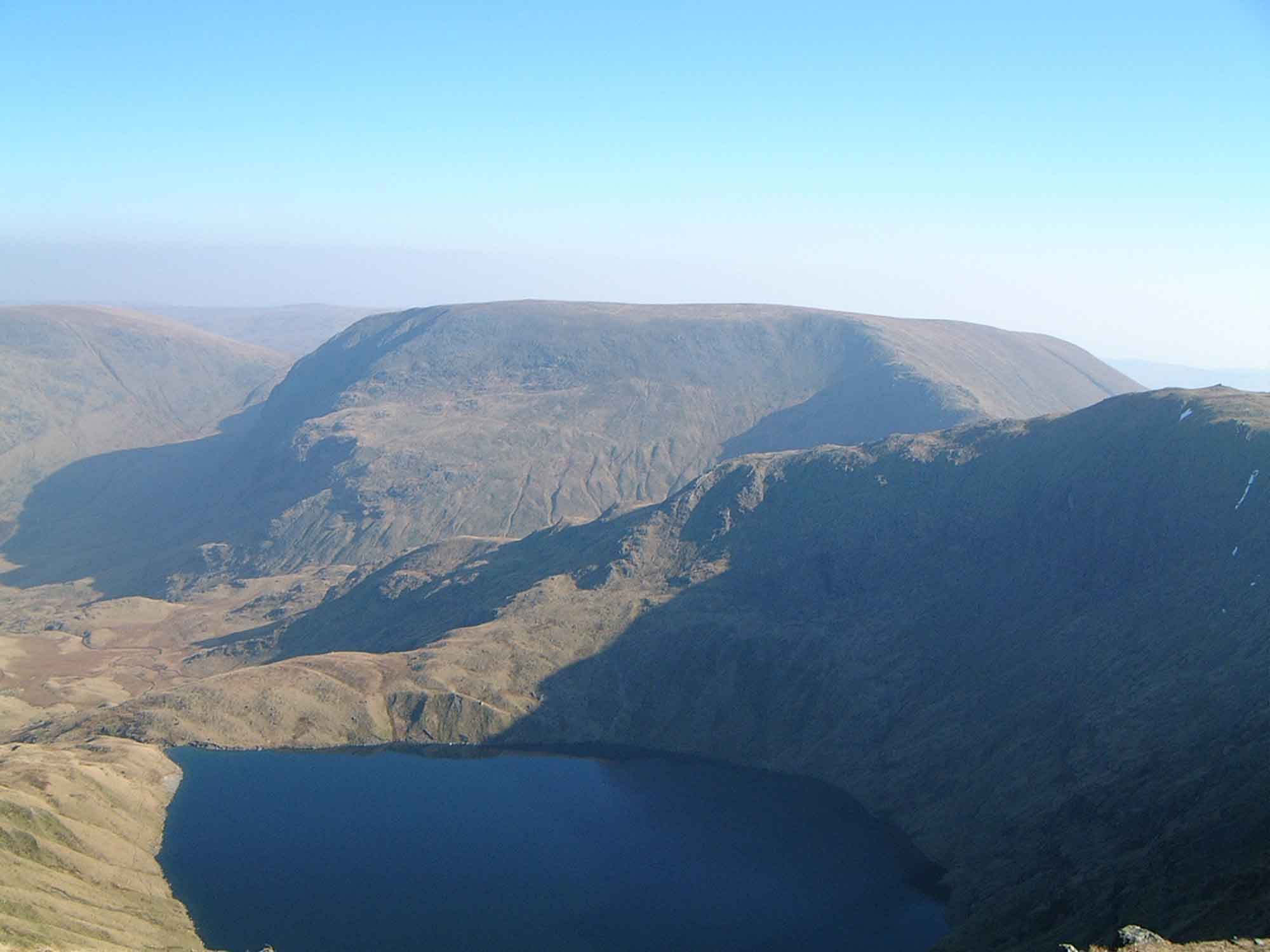
Harter Fell and Blea Water

To the south of High Street is the valley of Kentmere, with ridges on either flank that make a horseshoe walk. On the western side are: Ill Bell, Froswick and Yoke. To the east are Mardale Ill Bell, Harter Fell, Kentmere Pike and Shipman Knotts. Eastward again are the parallel valley of Longsleddale and the further ridge running from Branstree to Grey Crag.

From Kentmere, Harter Fell is mostly a grassy and rounded fell, its steeper side facing the head of Mardale, the valley holding Haweswater. Before the lake was raised by a dam in the 1930s the small village of Mardale Green stood at the head of the valley, now only revealed during extended droughts. Feeding the lake from either side of Mardale Ill Bell are the corrie tarns of Small Water and Blea Water, the latter being the deepest tarn in Lakeland.

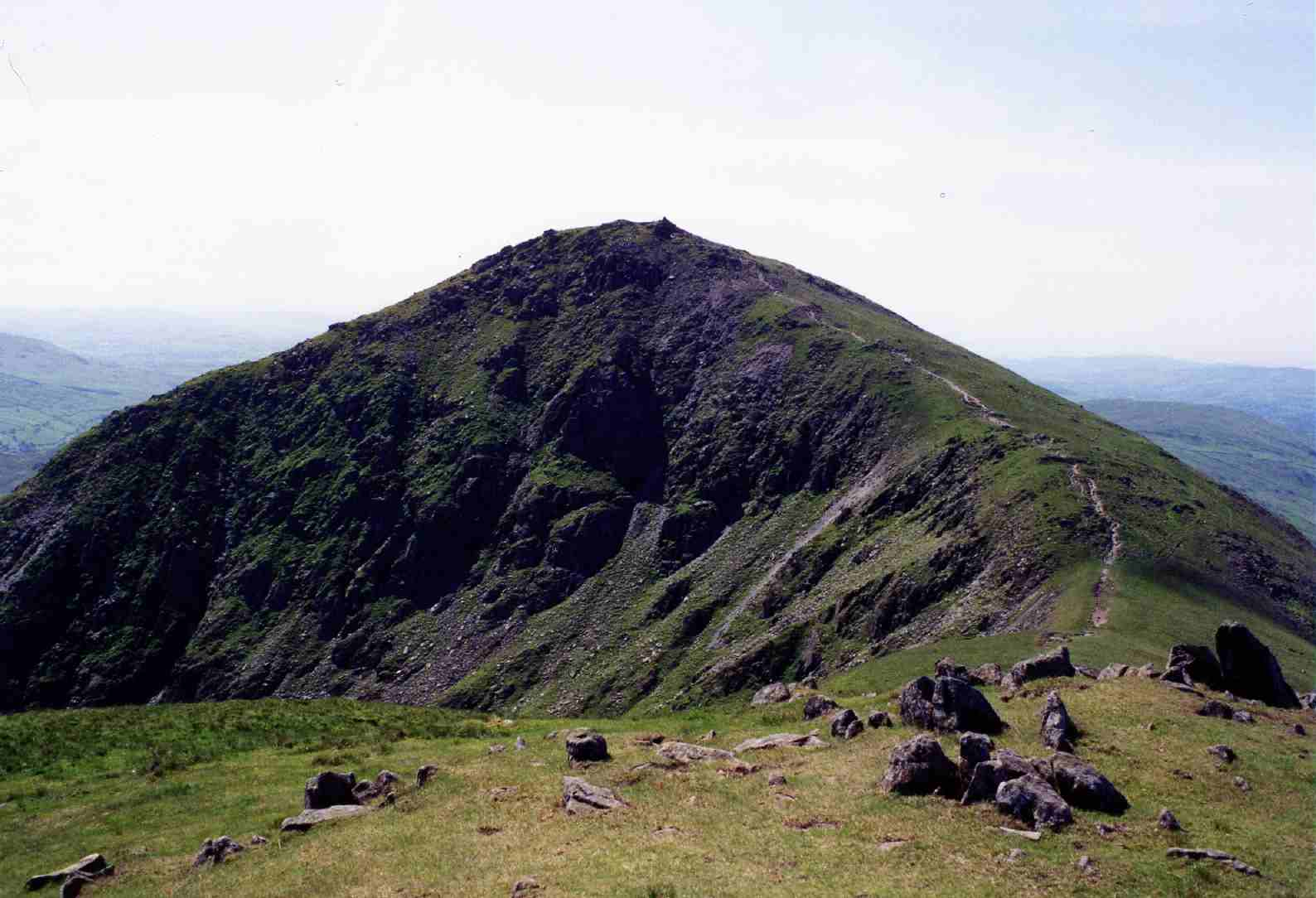
Ill Bell from Froswick

== Access for walkers ==
Patterdale and Glenridding provide a base to the north west, walks via Boredale Hause being possible along the ridges all the way to High Street. From Ambleside to the southwest the lower hills around Troutbeck are within easy reach. Martindale can be reached either by the Ullswater steamer or a long drive around the lake, Place Fell and Hallin Fell being particular favourites from this direction.

To the east of the group there are fewer facilities, particularly since the flooding of Mardale, although a car park lies at the head of the lake. Mardale Head is also the northern terminus of two walkers’ passes, Nan Bield to Kentmere and Gatescarth to Longsleddale. Both of these valleys also allow car access part way along, although in the summer months an extended bus service is provided for walkers. Expeditions into the group via the extreme eastern valleys result in long walks over unfrequented moorland.

== See also ==
- Eastern Fells
- Central Fells
- Southern Fells
- Northern Fells
- North Western Fells
- Western Fells
