= Cardale (surname) =

Cardale is a surname. Notable people with the surname include:

- Effie Julia Margaret Cardale (1873–1960), New Zealand social worker
- John Bate Cardale (1802–1877), English Irvingite
- Josephine Cardale, Australian entomologist
- Paul Cardale (1705–1775), English Dissenter
- Marianne Cardale de Schrimpff, archaeologist and anthropologist
