= Hartsop =

Village in Cumbria, England

Coordinates: 54.510°N 2.919°W

- Village
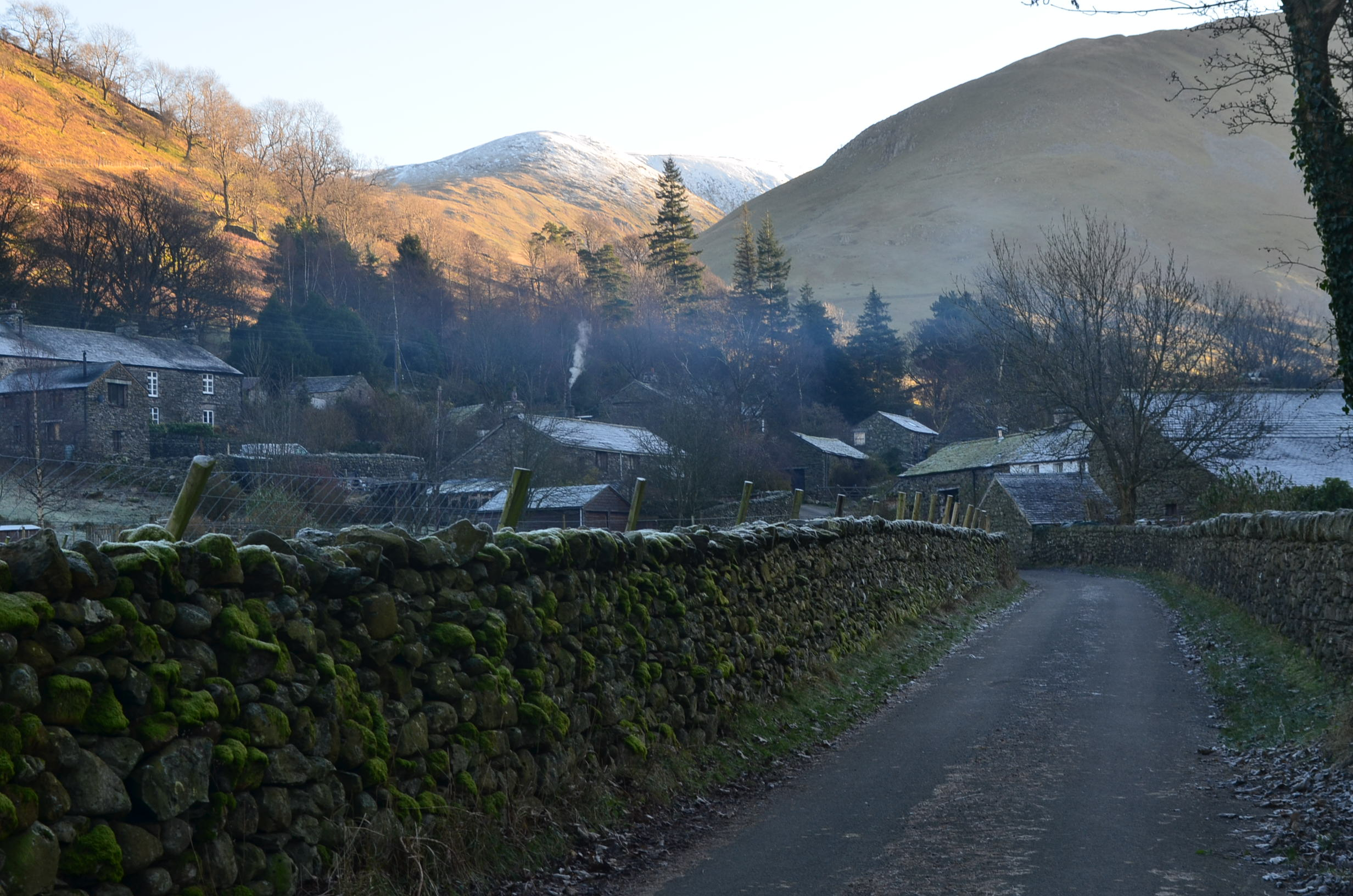
- Hartsop

- Location in the former Eden District Location within Cumbria
- OS grid reference: NY405131
- Civil parish: Patterdale
- Unitary authority: Westmorland and Furness
- Ceremonial county: Cumbria
- Region: North West
- Country: England
- Sovereign state: United Kingdom
- Post town: PENRITH
- Postcode district: CA11
- Dialling code: 017684
- Police: Cumbria
- Fire: Cumbria
- Ambulance: North West
- UK Parliament: Westmorland and Lonsdale

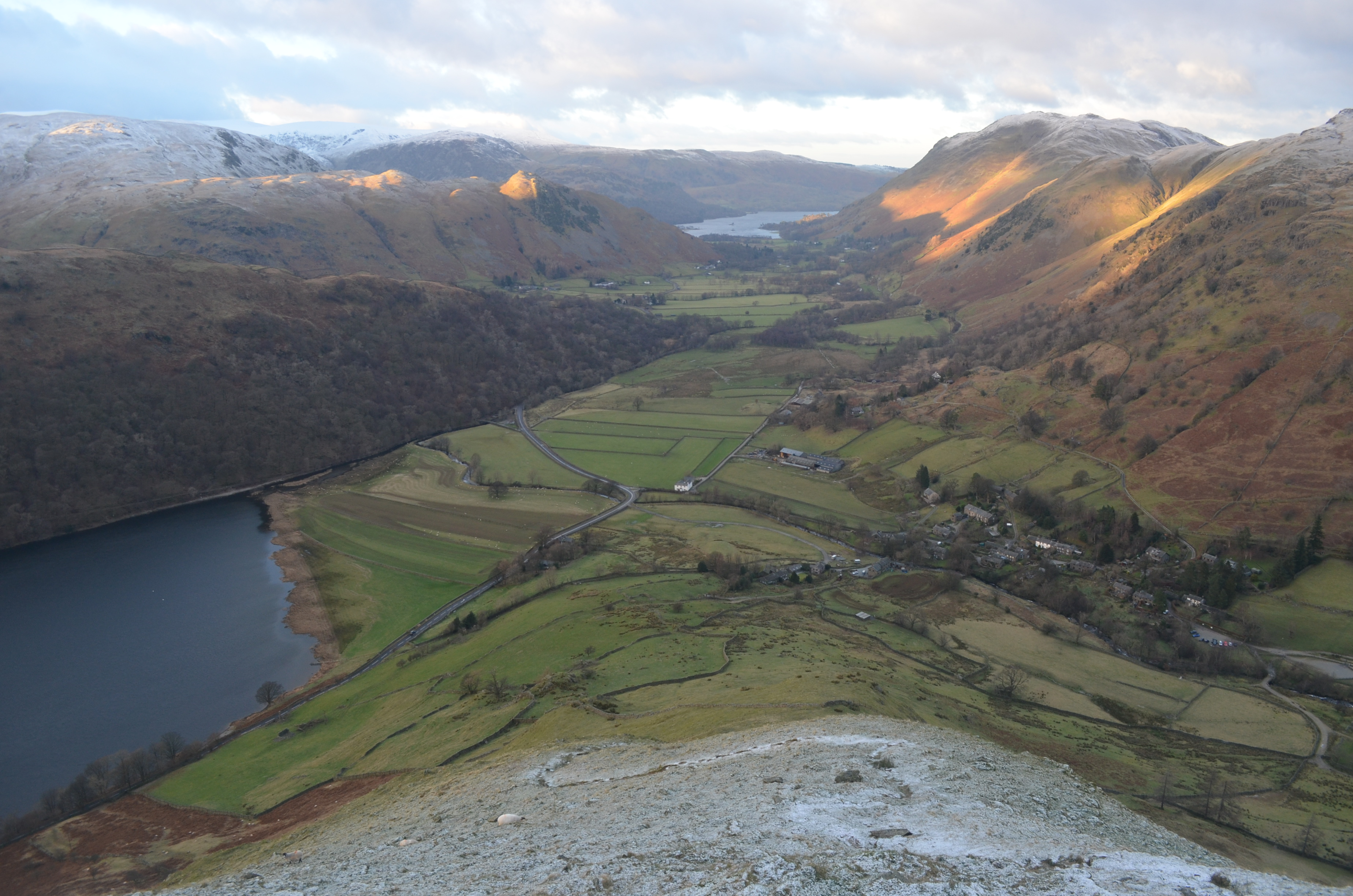
Hartsop (right) seen from Hartsop Dodd

Hartsop is a small village in the English Lake District. It lies in the Patterdale valley, near Brothers Water, Hayeswater and Kirkstone Pass.

It consists of 17th-century grey stone cottages, like so many of its neighbours. Hartsop retains its historic image, in that, in common with a number of other small Cumbrian villages, it had houses with spinning galleries. It was also a lead mining community.

Hartsop Hall, in the care of the National Trust, is located on the far side of the valley from the village. The hall dates from the 16th century, formerly the home of the de Lancasters; in the 17th century it passed into the ownership of Sir John Lowther, a member of the family that later became Earls of Lonsdale. After that, it became used as an ordinary farmhouse. Local history relates that when the hall was extended in the 18th century, it was built across an ancient right-of-way, a right which at least one dalesman insisted on exercising, by walking through the hall.

Hayeswater, an upland lake a mile east above the village, serves as a reservoir for the town of Penrith about 12 miles away.

Hartsop is a popular starting point for hill walkers climbing on the High Street range and the Helvellyn range. The village is overlooked by Brock Crags and Hartsop Dodd.

Hartsop is part of the civil parish of Patterdale.

== See also ==
- Listed buildings in Patterdale
