= Kirkstone Pass =

Mountain pass in Cumbria, England

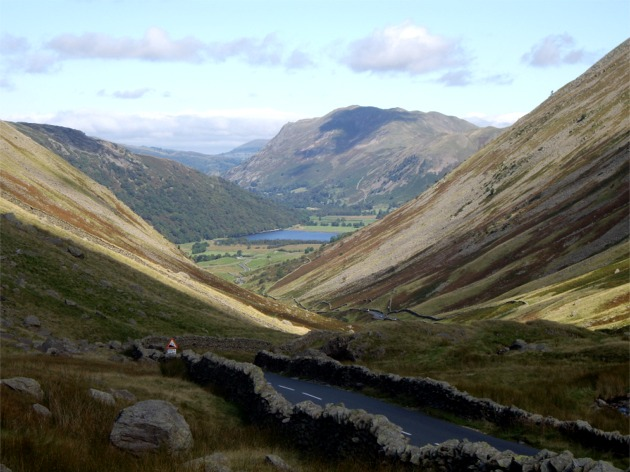
- Looking north down Kirkstone Pass

- Location within the Lake District Location within the former Eden District
- Elevation: 1,489 ft (454 m)
- Traversed by: A592 road

Location
- Coordinates: 54.47733°N 2.92283°W

Kirkstone Pass is a mountain pass in the English Lake District, in the county of Cumbria. It is at an altitude of 1,489 feet (454 m).

It is the District's highest pass traversed by road; the A592 between Ambleside in Rothay Valley and Patterdale in Ullswater Valley. The road gradient approaches 1 in 4. The picturesque view down into Patterdale has Brothers Water as its focal point.

The Kirkstone Pass Inn stands close to the summit. Once a vital coaching inn, it now caters primarily for tourists. It is the third-highest public house in England. (Note: The highest is the Tan Hill Inn in North Yorkshire; the next is the Cat and Fiddle Inn in the Peak District.)

== Slate quarrying ==
Lead and copper ore mining and slate mining has spanned centuries.

Petts Quarry worked by Kirkstone Green Slate Company is just to the Ambleside side of the summit. Nearby is Hartsop Hall lead mine.

Caudale slate mine is a few miles further down, on the Ullswater side, and was last worked at the beginning of the 20th century; all its adits are now blocked.

== Name ==
The name of the pass comes from a prominent stone, the Kirkstone, which stands a few yards from the A592 on the Patterdale side of the inn. Its shadow resembles a steeple; 'kirk' means church in old Norse and was a variant in related Old English.

In local names, the climb from Ambleside is known as The Struggle.

== Cultural references ==
In Cue for Treason, best-known novel of children's writer Geoffrey Trease, much of it set in Cumbria, the narrator's friend long uses the name "Kit Kirkstone", taken from the pass.

"Witch of the Westmorland" by musician Archie Fisher includes the lyric "weary by Ullswater, and the misty brake fern way, down through the cleft of the Kirkstone Pass, the winding water lay".

The video for Spandau Ballet's 1981 single "Muscle Bound" was shot in and around the Kirkstone Pass in winter under heavy snow, owing to its purported similarity to the Russian steppe.

== Gallery ==
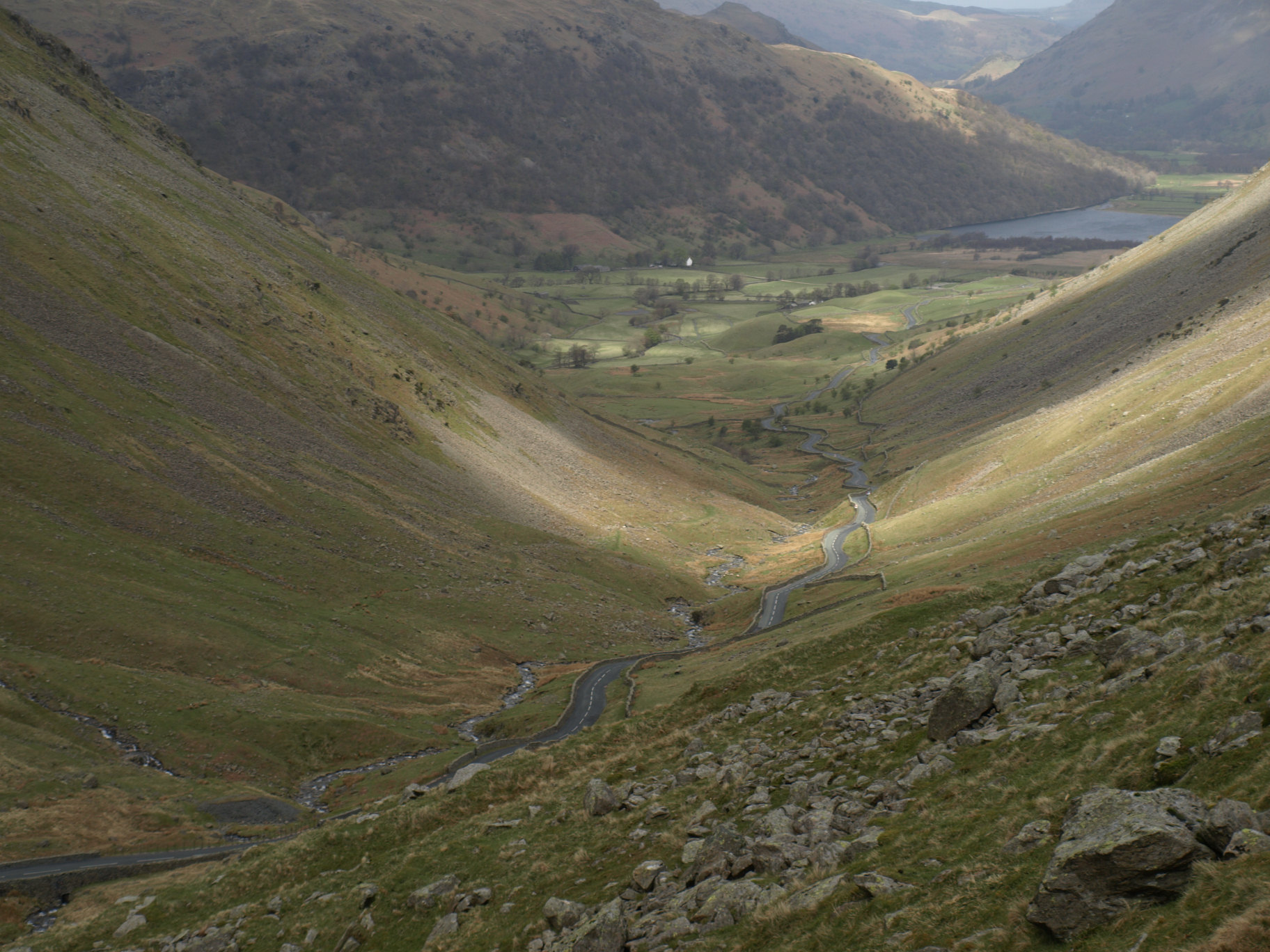
Kirkstone Pass descending to Brothers Water

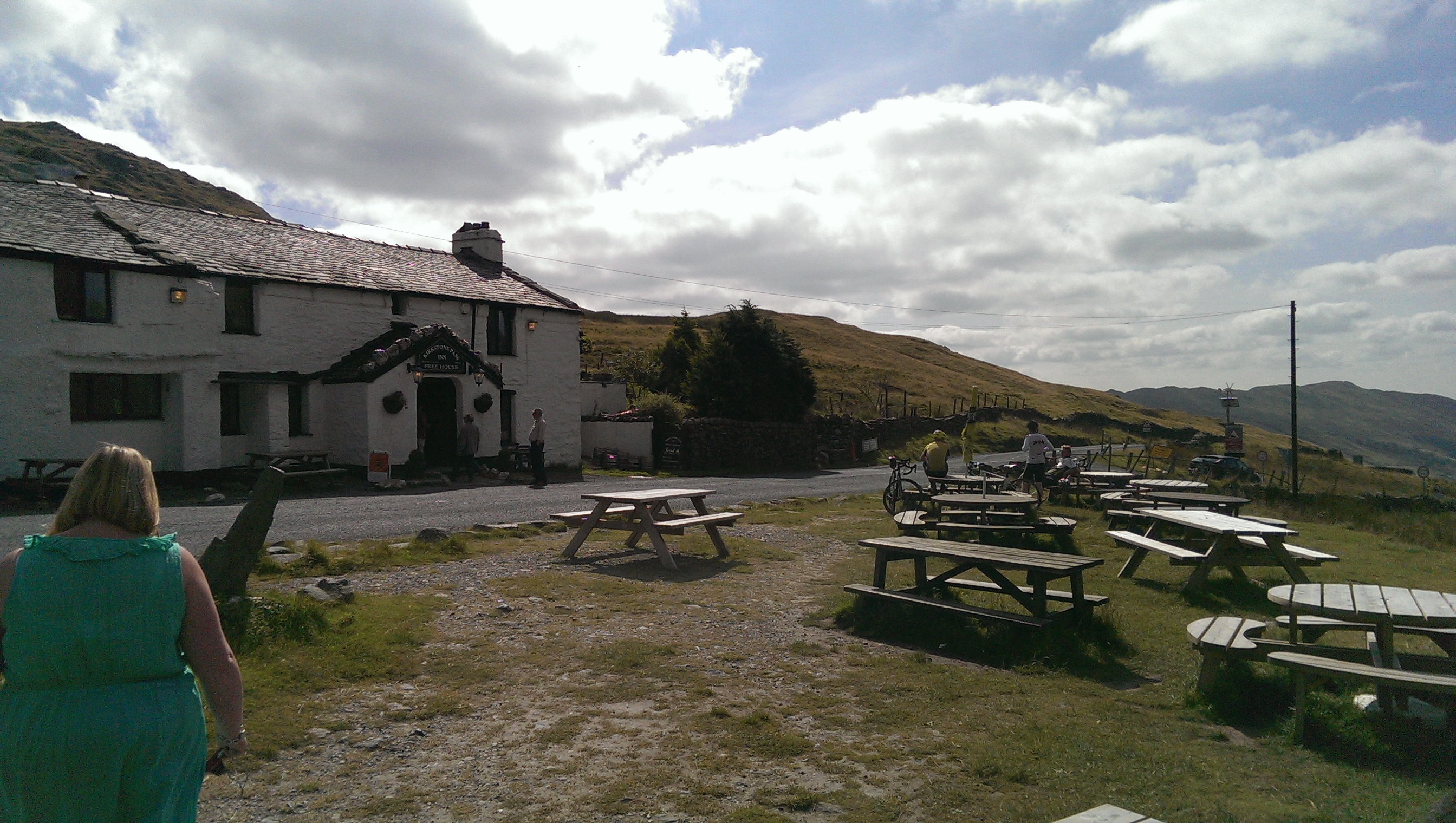
The Kirkstone Pass Inn

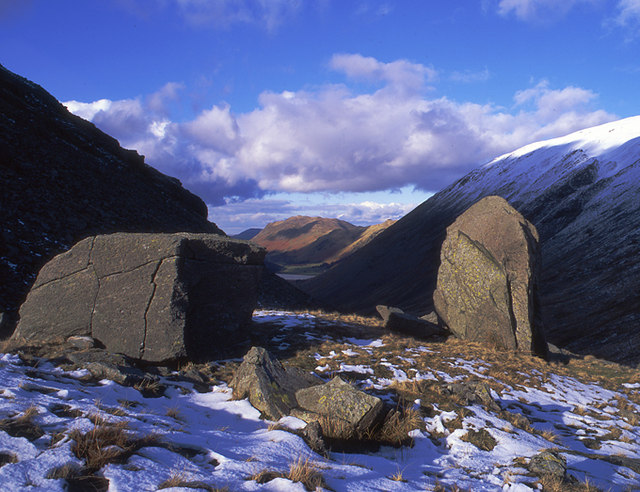
The church-like Kirk Stone at right, and nearby a nearly cuboid stone

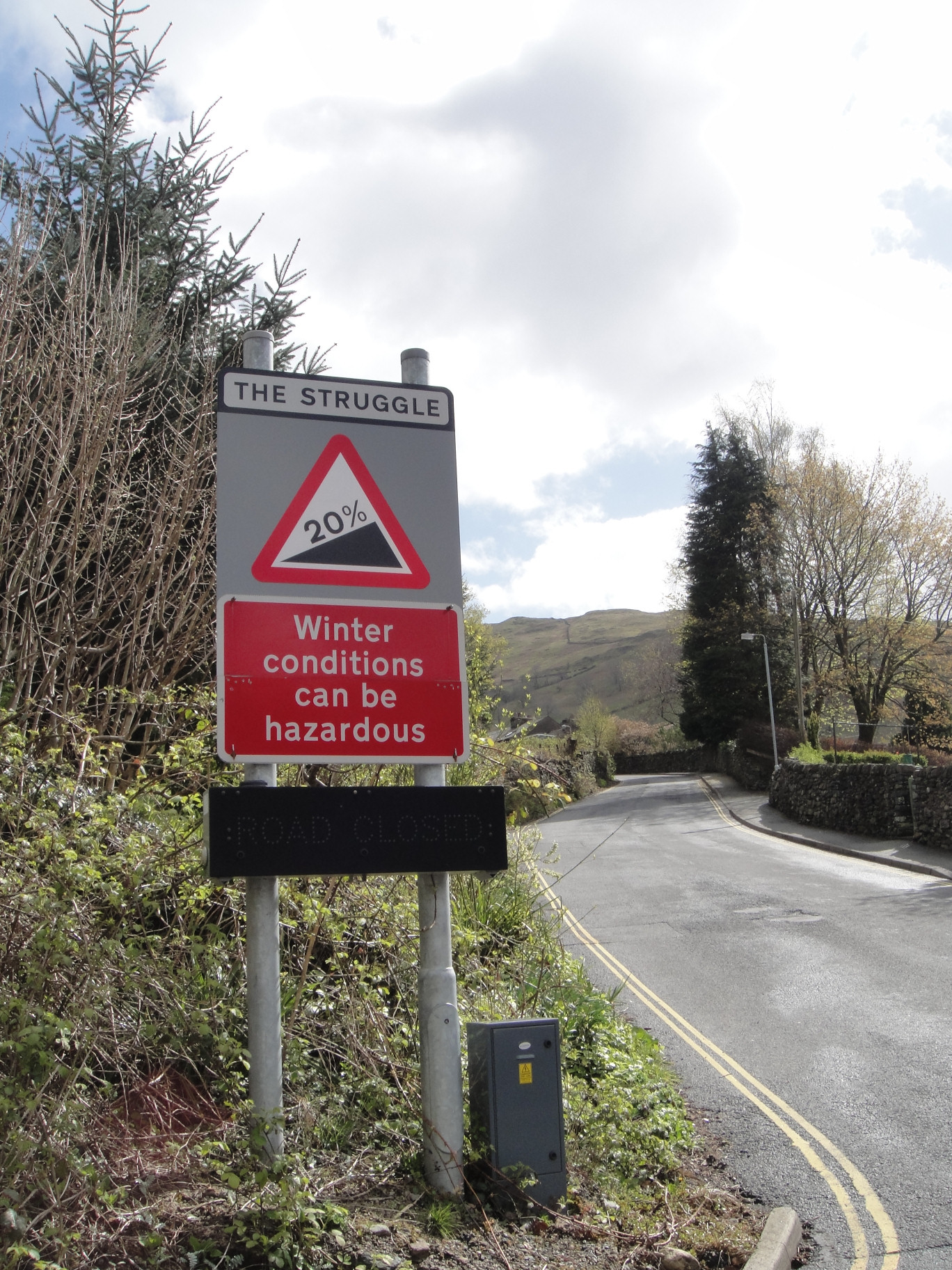
The bottom of The Struggle in Ambleside

View from Kirkstone Pass over a green mountain valley with a narrow road

== See also ==
- List of hill passes of the Lake District
