= Brothers Water =

Lake in the English Lake District, Cumbria, England

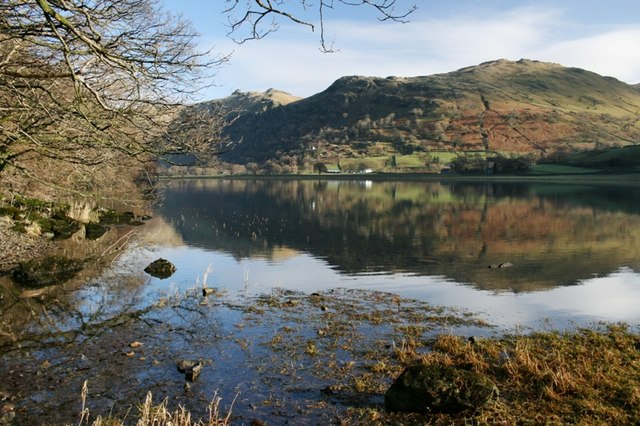

- Location in the Lake District National Park Location in Eden, Cumbria
- Location: Lake District, Cumbria
- Coordinates: 54°30′20″N 2°55′30″W
- Basin countries: United Kingdom

Brothers Water is a small lake in the Hartsop valley, in the eastern region of the Lake District in England. Once called Broader Water, it lies at the northern end of Kirkstone Pass, affording views on the descent towards Patterdale. The name was changed in the 19th century after two brothers drowned there.

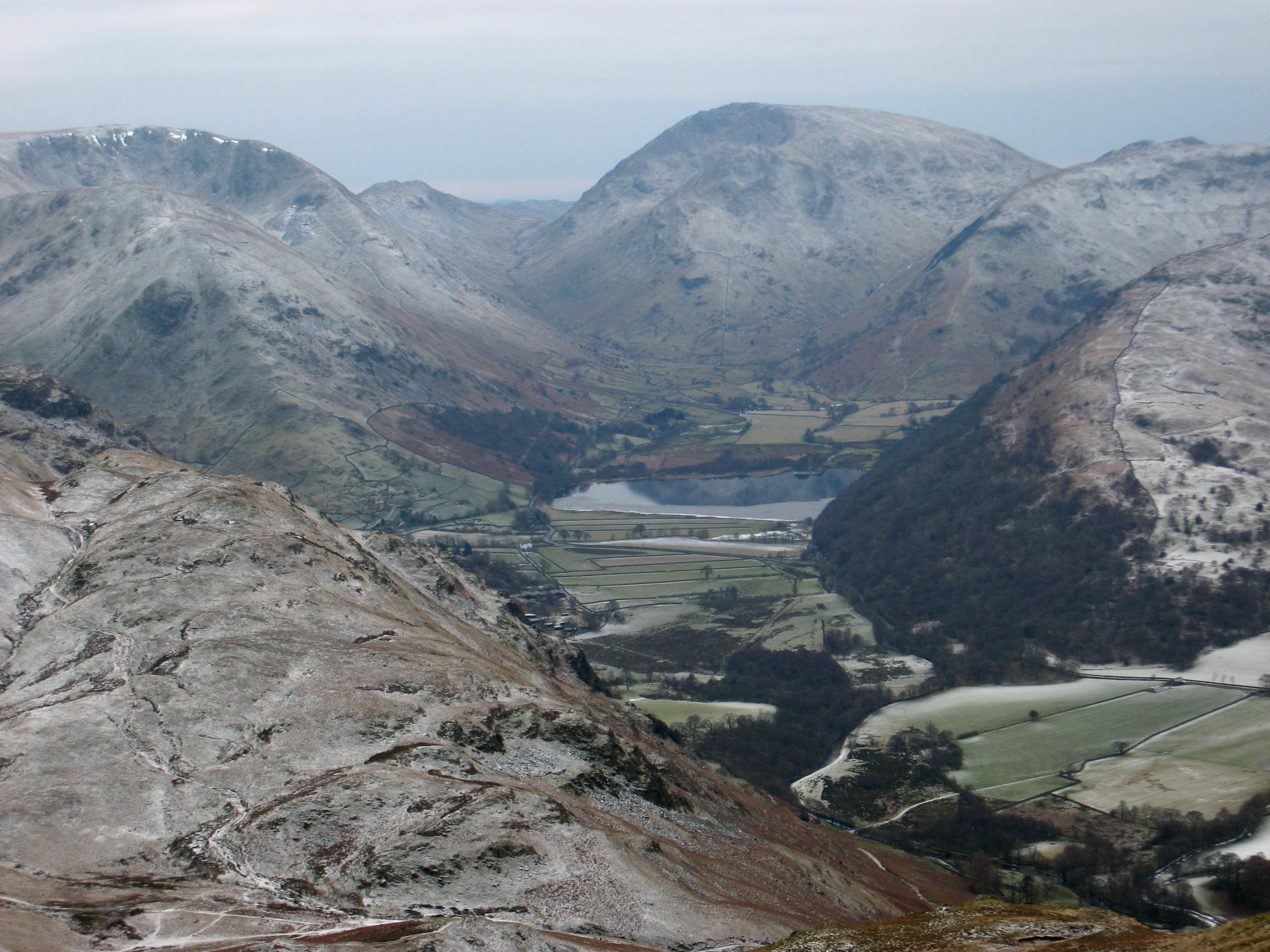
Brothers Water seen from the north

Dorothy Wordsworth, having left William Wordsworth sitting on Cow Bridge, walked beside the lake on 16 April 1802, commented on:

...the boughs of the bare old trees, the simplicity of the mountains, and the exquisite beauty of the path...the gentle flowing of the stream, the glittering, lively lake, green fields without a living creature to be seen on them.

The lake is not among the most popular in the national park, being shallow and full of reeds. Water lilies bloom in July, providing colour.

To the north-east of Brothers Water is the village of Hartsop, which has several 17th-century stone farm buildings and cottages. Some of the buildings still contain spinning-rooms where villagers would have made their own clothing, selling any surplus in the local market towns. The word Hartsop means "valley of the deer", which would have lived in the woodlands of the lower areas of the surrounding fells. A walk through woodland skirts the western shore. From its northern end the walk leads to Patterdale. Southward it heads over Kirkstone Pass to Ambleside.

On the western side of Brothers Water is Hartsop Hall. The 16th-century building passed to Sir John Lowther in the 17th century and is now owned by the National Trust. The village of Hartsop lies near the northeast corner of the lake. Brothers Water may be classified in either of two ways: as one of the Lake District's smallest lakes or one of its largest tarns.

The lake is home to a trout population and harbours a rare species of fish, the schelly.
