= Patterdale =

Village and civil parish in Cumbria, England

Coordinates: 54.53296°N 2.93490°W

- Village and parish
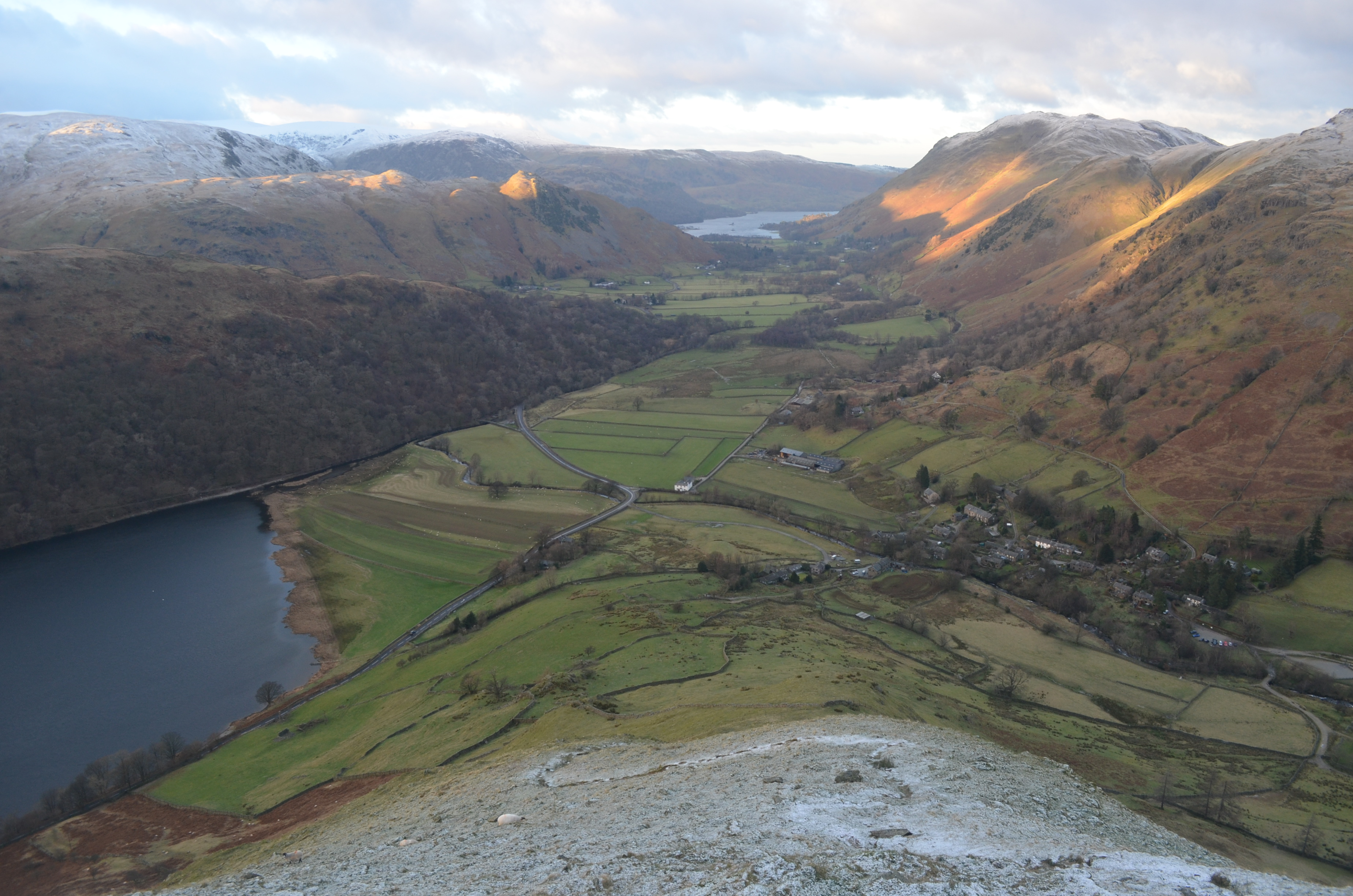
- The Patterdale valley seen from Hartsop Dodd

- Location in the former Eden District Location within Cumbria
- Population: 501 (2011)
- OS grid reference: NY3915
- Civil parish: Patterdale
- Unitary authority: Westmorland and Furness
- Ceremonial county: Cumbria
- Region: North West
- Country: England
- Sovereign state: United Kingdom
- Post town: PENRITH
- Postcode district: CA11
- Dialling code: 017684
- Police: Cumbria
- Fire: Cumbria
- Ambulance: North West
- UK Parliament: Westmorland and Lonsdale

Patterdale (Saint Patrick's Dale) is a small village and civil parish in the Westmorland and Furness district of Cumbria, England. It is in the eastern part of the Lake District, and the name is also used for the long valley in which the village sits, also called the Ullswater Valley. The parish had a population of 460 in 2001, increasing to 501 at the 2011 census.

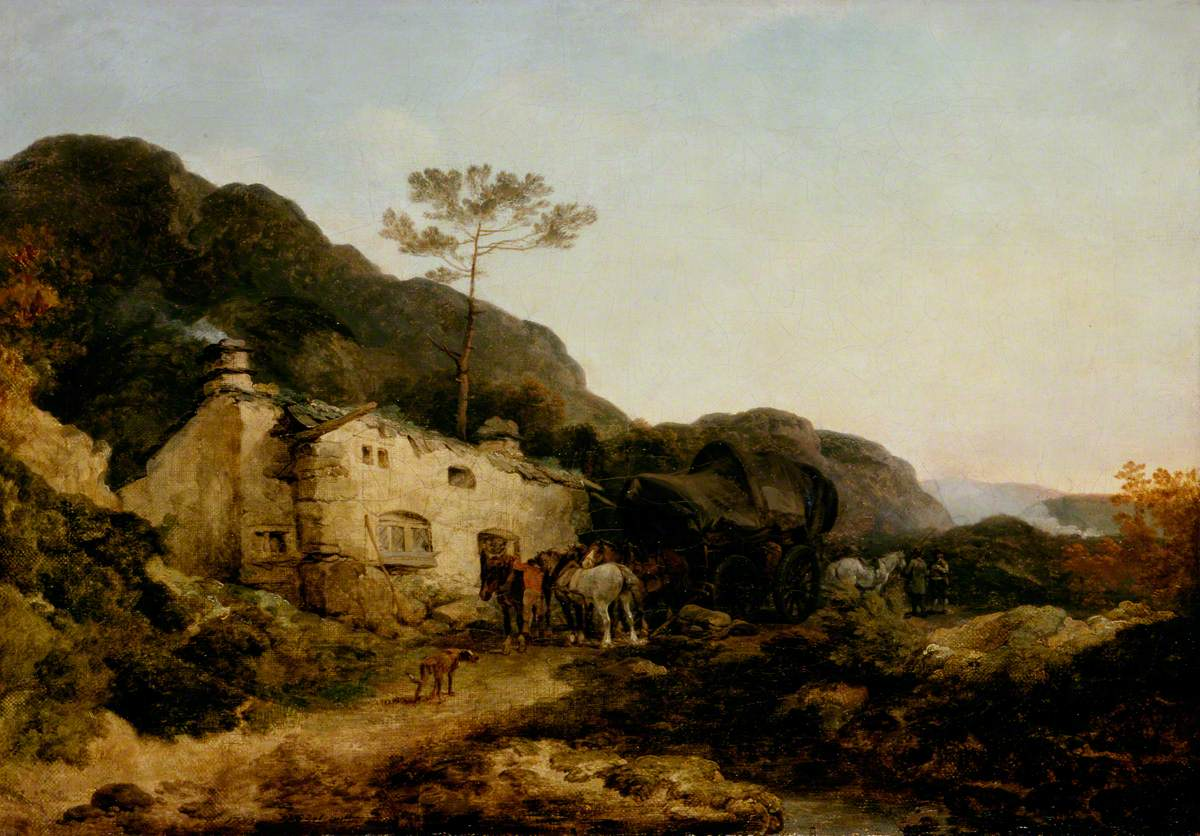
A Cottage in Patterdale, Westmoreland by Philip James de Loutherbourg, 1783

The poet William Wordsworth lived near Patterdale in his youth, and his autobiographical poem The Prelude narrates such childhood activities as fishing in the lake from a stolen boat. The village is now the start point for hill walking, most notably the Striding Edge path up to Helvellyn. Other fells that can be reached from the valley include Place Fell, High Street, Glenridding Dodd, most of the peaks in the Helvellyn range, Fairfield and St Sunday Crag, and Red Screes and Stony Cove Pike at the very end of the valley, standing either side of the Kirkstone Pass which is the road to Ambleside.

Further up the valley to the north is the lake of Ullswater with Gowbarrow Fell and Hallin Fell overlooking it. The only tarn in the valley is Brothers Water, one of the first places in the Lake District to be acquired by the National Trust. The only other village in the valley is Glenridding. Patterdale village has a youth hostel, a church, a primary school and a hotel. In summer it can get quite busy, but not so much as Glenridding. Patterdale is considered to be a walkers' valley, and in fact Alfred Wainwright stated that it was his favourite valley in the Lake District as it is relatively undisturbed by tourism.

Patterdale and Glenridding were badly affected by Storm Desmond in December 2015.

== Local government ==
The civil parish of Patterdale also includes the villages of Glenridding and Hartsop. As well as the southern end of Ullswater and the smaller lake of Brothers Water.

From 1894 to 1934, the parish was part of the West Ward Rural District of the county of Westmorland, then was transferred to the newly created Lakes Urban District, finally becoming part of Eden District of Cumbria in 1974, under the Local Government Act 1972. In 2023, Eden District was abolished and absorbed into the newly created Westmorland and Furness unitary authority area.

The parish was once an outlying part of Barton, which is about 10 miles (16 km) from Patterdale.

== Geography ==
The A592 road, Windermere to Penrith runs through the parish from the col of the Kirkstone Pass in the south to Glencoyne Bridge in the north.

== Transport ==
Stagecoach Cumbria operators the bus routes in the village.

Stagecoach operates the 508 to Windermere/Penrith and the 509 originates at the Village and goes to Penrith.

The nearest national rail station is either Windermere or Penrith both at least a 40 minute drive from the Village.

== See also ==
- Listed buildings in Patterdale
- Patterdale Terrier
