= High Street (Lake District) =

Mountain in Cumbria, England

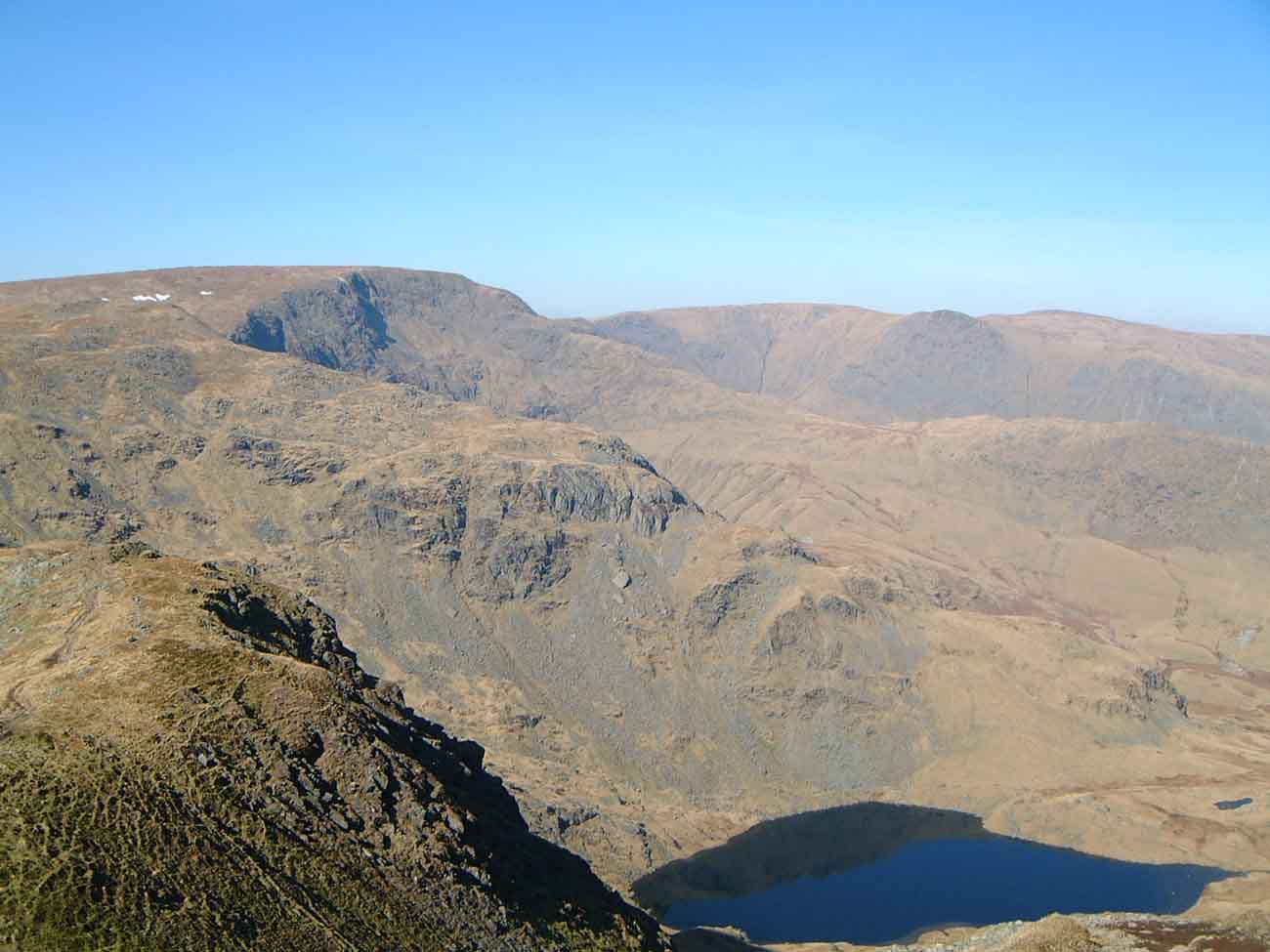
- High Street seen from Harter Fell with Small Water in the foreground

Highest point
- Elevation: 828 m (2,717 ft)
- Prominence: 373 m (1,224 ft)
- Parent peak: Helvellyn
- Listing: Marilyn, Hewitt, Wainwright, Nuttall
- Coordinates: 54°29′31″N 2°51′54″W

Geography
- Location within the Lake District Location within the former South Lakeland district Location within the former Eden District
- Location: Cumbria, England
- Parent range: Lake District, Far Eastern Fells
- OS grid: NY440110
- Topo map: OS Explorer OL5

High Street is a fell in the English Lake District. At 828 metres (2,717 ft), its summit is the highest point in the far eastern part of the national park. The fell is named after the Roman road that ran over the summit.

== History ==
=== Roman road ===
A Roman road, a scheduled monument, crosses the fell between Roman forts at Brougham (Brocavum) near Penrith and Ambleside (Galava). Although the route takes the road higher than any other Roman road in England, the High Street range has quite gentle slopes and a flat summit plateau, characteristics that may have persuaded Roman surveyors to build the road over the fell tops rather than through the valleys which were densely forested and marshy making them susceptible to ambush. There has been speculation that the Romans made use of a prehistoric trackway.

The nature of the Roman road remains problematic, as much of it is sunken in a hollow, rather than being built on top of an embankment or agger in the usual Roman fashion. Funding was obtained for an archaeological excavation to investigate the Roman road in 2022. The investigation focussed on a stretch of the road at Bampton Common.

=== Fairs ===
The fell's flat summit was used as a venue for summer fairs by the local population in the 18th and 19th centuries. People from the surrounding valleys gathered annually on 12 July to return stray sheep to their owners. Games and wrestling also took place as well as horse racing. The summit of High Street is known as Racecourse Hill, and is so named on maps, and fell ponies can be found grazing occasionally on its summit. The last of the summer fairs was held in 1835.

== Topography ==
The River Kent, which flows south through the town of Kendal before emptying into Morecambe Bay, has its source on High Street's southern slopes. Dropping 300 m in 40 km (980 ft in 25 miles), the Kent is reputed to be the fastest-flowing river in England.

High Street's eastern side is craggy and precipitous as it falls away towards Haweswater Reservoir. There are two tarns underneath the eastern crags – Blea Water and Small Water; Blea Water, in a classic mountain corrie at 200 feet (61 m) is the deepest tarn in the Lake District. (But note that Wast Water with a depth of 258 feet (79 m) is the deepest lake.)

== Summit ==
A wall follows the ridge over the flat summit, the highest point is marked by an Ordnance Survey triangulation column which has been painted white. The view stretches from the Pennines in the east to a great arc of Lakeland hills filling the western horizon. The Helvellyn range and Southern Fells are particularly striking.

== Ascents ==
The climb from Mardale is an exhilarating ridge walk, with views down into Riggindale which at one time might have been supplemented by the sight of a golden eagle. Riggindale had the only bird of this kind left in England, a solitary male, which had been on its own there since 2004, but has not been seen since 2016. High Street can also be climbed from Patterdale, Kentmere and Troutbeck. The full south-to-north traverse of the High Street ridge from Ings near Windermere to the Eamont valley at the northern end of Ullswater is a 30-kilometre (19-mile) hike over twelve summits, and should be undertaken only by experienced walkers.

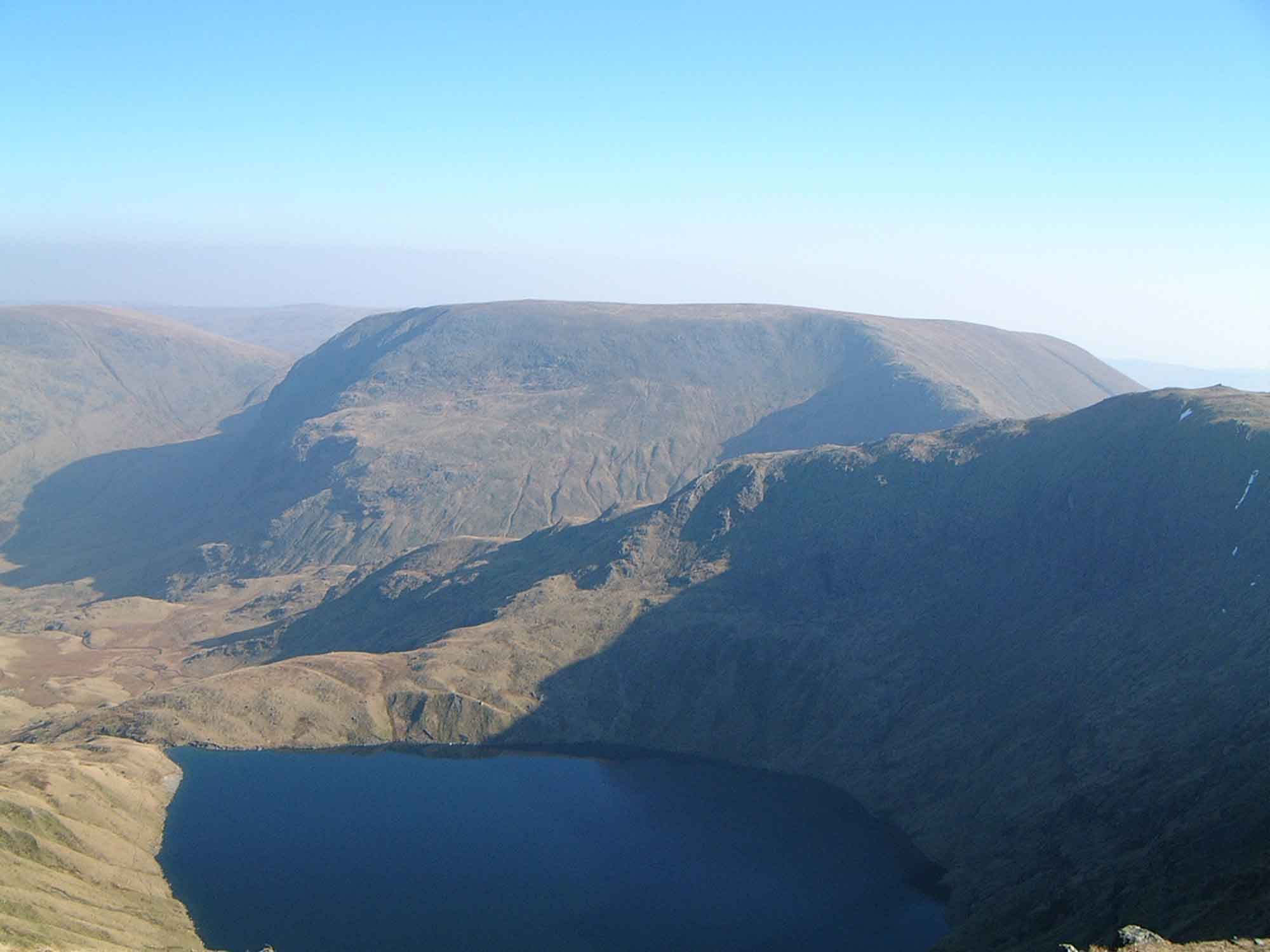
View from the summit of High Street, looking towards Harter Fell with Blea Water in the foreground

== See also ==
- Hardknott Roman Fort
