= List of hill passes of the Lake District =

Mountain routes in northwest England

Hill passes of the Lake District were originally used by people in one valley travelling to another nearby without having to go many miles around a steep ridge of intervening hills. Historically, in the Lake District of northwest England, travel on foot or by pony was difficult because of the region's steep-sided valleys so tracks across the ridges were created taking the easiest route over passes – often, but not always, via a col. Since Roman times long-distance travel had tended to be along ridges. From the 19th century these passes and ridge routes were brought back into use when recreational hill walking become popular. Forty hill passes within the Lake District National Park are listed here, using criteria for selecting the major routes.

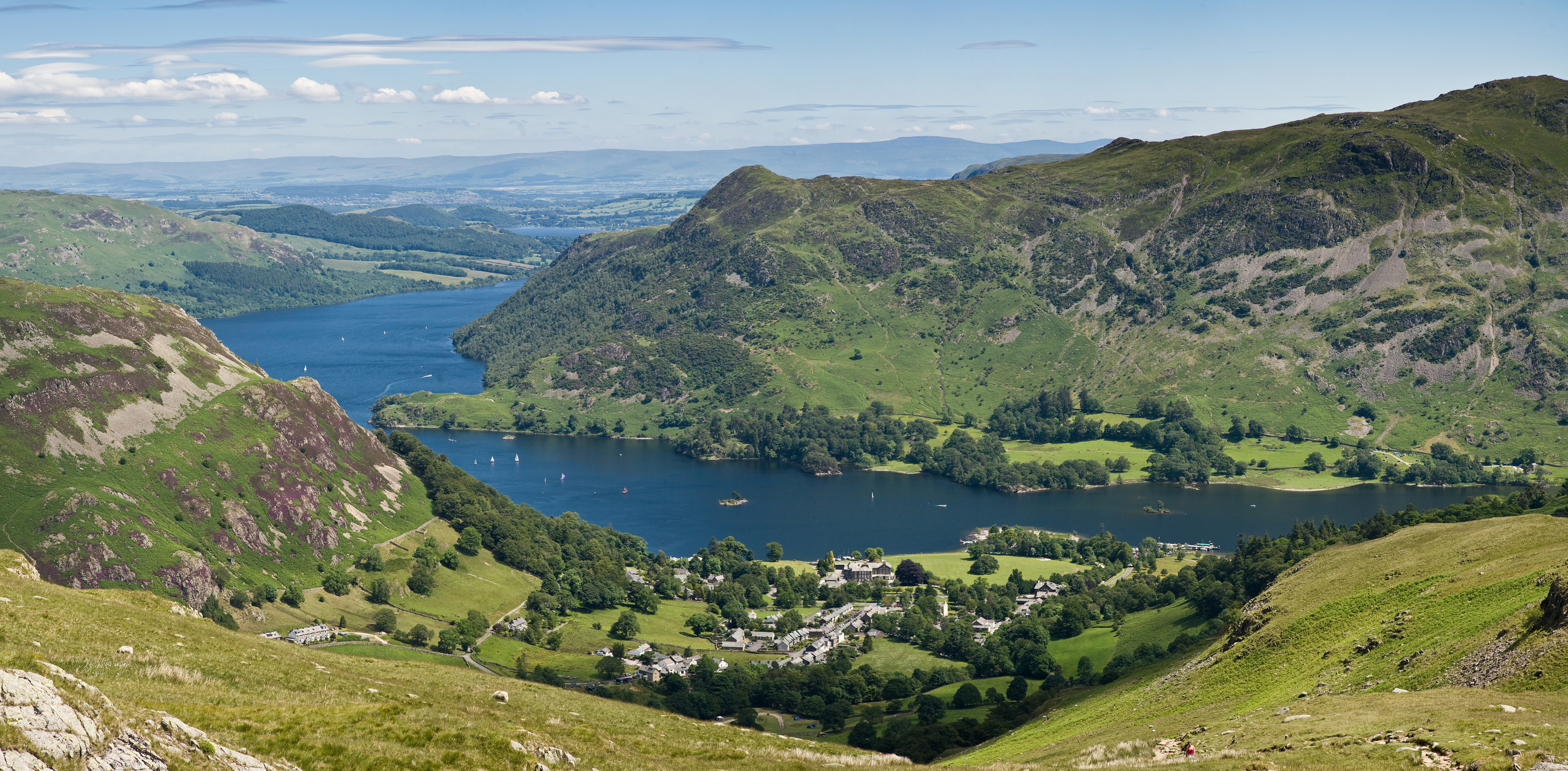
Ullswater valley

== Background ==
The Lake District National Park was created in 1951 covering an area of over 2,000 square kilometres (770 sq mi) and, although its population is only 42,000, over 10 million visitors arrive each year, mostly attracted by the lakes and fells.

=== Geology ===
About 500 million years ago in the late Cambrian and early Ordivician periods, the region was situated where the Iapetus ocean floor was being subducted under the Avalonia plate. Sedimentary material became metamorphosed to the Skiddaw slates found in the north and west. For a relatively short time of 5 million years Ordovician volcanoes ejected the Borrowdale volcanic rocks – firstly lavas (mostly andesite} and later pyroclastic rocks found in the more central part of the region. The ejection of rock was extreme by world standards and it produced deposits at least 6,000 metres (20,000 ft) deep. When the Baltica-Avalonia and Laurentia continents collided some 420 million years ago in the Caledonian orogeny there was folding of the slate and fracturing (faulting) of the more brittle volcanic rock. The whole region was then uplifted again by a batholith of granite mainly in the Carboniferous period although the granite remains largely below the surface. The high ground became gradually eroded and to the south the land subsided. In the south 8,000 metres (26,000 ft) of Windermere Supergroup sediment formed in the Silurian period with Coniston Limestone towards its base. Overall cover of limestone eroded away.

In the north, slaty rocks now form a smooth topography with sharp ridges although the hills can still be quite high – 931 metres (3,054 ft) in the case of Skiddaw. Centrally the pyroclastic tuff rocks give a knobbly terrain such as that around Scafell Pike, 978 metres (3,209 ft), England's highest mountain. To the south is a mostly less hilly area.

=== Glaciation ===
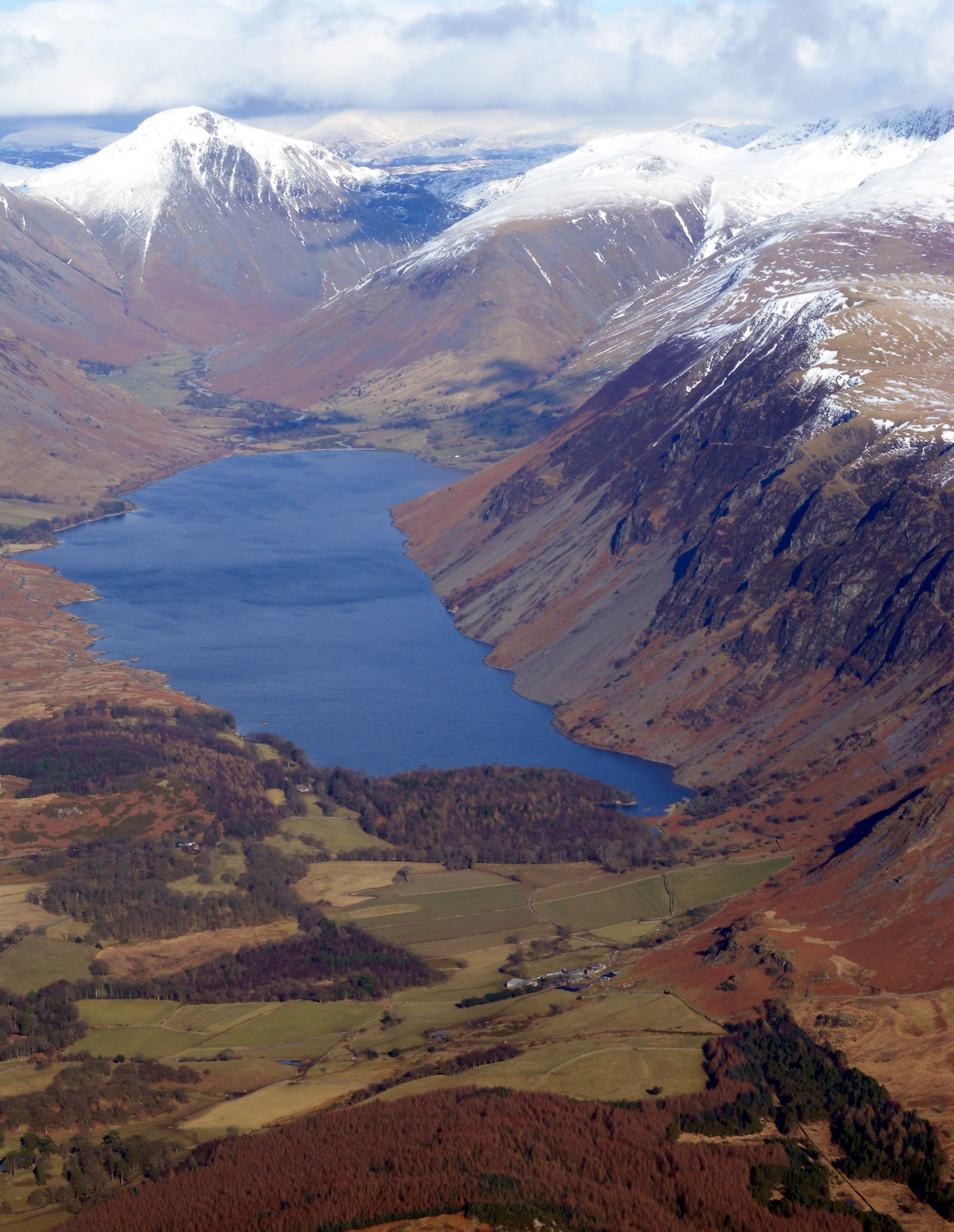
Ribbon lake formed by glacial erosion – Wast Water in Wasdale

From about 2 million years ago glacial erosion then greatly modified the landscape. Glaciers formed preferentially at existing streams which had developed at the many rock faults produced by crushing during the continental collision. The terrain was ground away leaving characteristically steep-sided glacial valleys which became ribbon lakes. On the Rossett Pass (see below) Rossett Gill is an example of a geological fault and the glacier that descended from it created the Mickleden and Great Langdale valleys below. Taken as a whole the region is characterised by mountain ridges splaying out from a central core. The intervening valleys have been made by glaciers flowing outward along the lines of the previous streams draining the dome of the Lake District.

=== Human history ===
Historically the region was suitable for sheep hill farming and from medieval (or possibly Roman) times there was a substantial mining industry for rocks and minerals. The Romans had built a high-level military road north–south right through the region on its eastern edge at High Street and another road through the Hardknott and Wrynose passes for travel between forts at Ravenglass and Ambleside. Travelling between valleys was difficult on foot or by pony because of the steep passes across the mountainous ridges. With no roads suitable for wheeled traffic until the late 18th century, for long-distance transport of goods long trains of horses were used with ridge routes being preferred although Esk Hause and Stake Pass (see below) are thought to have been used in this way. However, for travel within the region, routes were best kept as low as possible consistent with avoiding excessive detours so summits and ridges were to be avoided as far as possible.

In the late 18th century the region started to become popular with travellers and the "Lake Poets" began seeing the lakes and mountains as beautiful rather than horrifying. In Victorian times, encouraged by the arrival of the Kendal and Windermere Railway, a tourist trade developed. In the mid twentieth century Alfred Wainwright inadvertently encouraged further recreational use with his series of books A Pictorial Guide to the Lakeland Fells which described detailed routes to the major summits. His considerable knowledge of the district allowed him to make use of the ancient tracks although his focus was not on the ridge passes themselves.

== Hill passes ==
The passes are indicated in the following maps that are identical except for the annotation included. Both show the regions defined by Wainwright for his books. The first map shows the passes with their sequential numbers in the table. It also marks major lakes, valleys (dales) and a few important mountains. The second map shows the passes with their names (or a col on the route) and a few major towns. The colouring of the routes is merely to separate different adjacent ones.

Maps of Lake District National Park showing hill passes

Showing pass numbers, lakes, valleys and mountains

Showing names of passes and towns

Table of Lake District hill passes, alphabetically within region
| Reference (Note: The reference provides first the number of the region – the table is initially in order of the region for which the pass is most relevant – "region" being the volume number of the book in Wainwright's series Pictorial Guide to the Lakeland Fells. (Note: Wainwright, Alfred (2009). Book One, The Eastern Fells. Frances Lincoln. ISBN 978-0-7112-2943-3.(same content as first 1955 edition)) (Note: Wainwright, Alfred (2009). Book Two, The Far Eastern Fells. Frances Lincoln. ISBN 978-0-7112-2944-0.(same content as first 1957 edition)) (Note: Wainwright, Alfred (2009). Book Three, The Central Fells. Frances Lincoln. ISBN 978-0-7112-2945-7.(same content as first 1958 edition)) (Note: Wainwright, Alfred (2009). Book Four, The Southern Fells. Frances Lincoln. ISBN 978-0-7112-2946-4.(same content as first 1960 edition)) (Note: Wainwright, Alfred (2009). Book Five, The Northern Fells. Frances Lincoln. ISBN 978-0-7112-2947-1.(same content as first 1962 edition)) (Note: Wainwright, Alfred (2009). Book Six, The North Western. Frances Lincoln. ISBN 978-0-7112-2948-8.(same content as first 1964 edition)) (Note: Wainwright, Alfred (2009). Book Seven, The Western Fells. Frances Lincoln. ISBN 978-0-7112-2949-5.(same content as first 1966 edition)) Secondly the "route" – to help locate the routes on the maps in this article they have been given a sequence number. Finally the route's colour on the maps has been noted.) Name (Note: Following the reference is the name of the pass or of some named point on the route – sorting the table places it in alphabetical order of name.) (path type) (Note: The type of path is in brackets. The terminology is as described in Rights of way in England and Wales.) | Height/ (Note: Elevation (metres and feet) and OS grid reference of top of pass. – in a few instances the point named is some other waypoint (not the top) of the pass.) OS grid | Start: (Note: The "start and "end" locations of a pass are in arbitrary order and the valleys are those between which the pass travels. The actual places named are merely some identifiable low level locations on either side of the high point. No attempt is made to imply any length for the pass – the route via the col of the pass may be much shorter. The elevations of the terminating locations are of little relevance and no information is given about the elevation gained in crossing a pass.) Valley/ place/ OS grid | End: Valley/ place/ OS grid | Notes | Image |
|---|---|---|---|---|---|
| 1/01/blue Deepdale Hause (footpath/path) | 655 m (2,149 ft)/ NY360125 | Patterdale/ Bridgend/ NY398143 | Thirlmere/ Dunmail Raise/ NY327117 | Part way the footpath becomes an undefined type of path. | |
| 1/02/green Grisedale Hause (bridleway) | 590 m (1,940 ft)/ NY350117 | Patterdale/ Grisedale Bridge/ NY382156 | Grasmere/ Mill Bridge/ NY336091 | | |
| 1/03/red Kirkstone Pass (road) | 454 m (1,489 ft)/ NY401082 | Patterdale/ Bridge End/ NY399143 | Rothay / Ambleside/ NY376047 | North: A592 (continuing to the town of Windermere). South: unclassified road. | |
| 1/04/green Scandale Pass (footpath) | 516 m (1,693 ft)/ NY387095 | Patterdale/ Caudale Bridge/ NY401110 | Rothay; Ambleside/ NY384082 | | |
| 1/05/black Sticks Pass (bridleway) | 738 m (2,421 ft)/ NY341182 | Patterdale/ Glencoyne/ NY387186 | Thirlmere/ Legburthwaite/ NY318189 | | |
| 2/06/magenta Boredale Hause (bridleway) | 399 m (1,309 ft)/ NY408157 | Patterdale/ Hartsop/ NY405132 | Boredale/ Boredale Head/ NY418169 | Or Boardale Hause | |
| 2/07/blue Boredale Hause (bridleway) | 500 m (1,600 ft)/ NY417157 | Patterdale/ Patterdale/ NY400161 | Martindale/ Dale Head/ NY433164 | Boredale Hause is not the high point of this route. | |
| 2/08/green Garburn Pass (bridleway) | 447 m (1,467 ft)/ NY433043 | Kentmere/ Kentmere/ NY455044 | Troutbeck/ (village)/ NY423006 | The southern part is a restricted byway that is now closed to vehicles. | |
| 2/09/blue Gatescarth Pass (restricted byway) | 572 m (1,877 ft)/ NY473092 | Mardale/ Mardale Head/ NY469107 | Longsleddale/ Sadgill/ NY483056 | Restricted byway – open to all except motor vehicles (but permits are available). | |
| 2/10/red Pass over Ketley Gate (bridleway) | 323 m (1,060 ft)/ NY489223 | Eamont/ Pooley Bridge/ NY479235 | Lowther/ Helton/ NY506210 | Wainwright does not mention a name. | |
| 2/11/red Nan Bield Pass (bridleway) | 640 m (2,100 ft)/ NY452095 | Mardale/ Mardale Head/ NY468107 | Kentmere/ Hallow Bank/ NY464053 | | |
| 2/12/black Old Corpse Road, Mardale (bridleway) | 512 m (1,680 ft)/ NY493122 | Mardale/ (Mardale Green); NY479118 | Swindale/ Swindale Head/ NY504125 | | |
| 3/13/green Pass over Greenup Edge (bridleway) | 608 m (1,995 ft)/ NY285105 | Rothay/ Easedale/ NY327084 | Stonethwaite/ Stonethwaite/ NY263138 | | |
| 3/14/green Pass over High Tove (footpath) | 508 m (1,667 ft)/ NY288165 | Watendlath Valley/ Watendlath/ NY275163 | Thirlmere/ Armboth/ NY304171 | The traditional footpath crosses the summit of High Tove. (Note: The summit of High Tove is scarcely higher than the ridge it is on and the route is the driest way over the ridge.) | |
| 3/15/blue Pass over Long Moss (bridleway) | 525 m (1,722 ft)/ NY296139 | Watendlath Valley/ Watendlath/ NY275163 | Thirlmere/ Wythburn/ NY319131 | | |
| 3/16/blue Pass near Megs Gill (footpath) | 230 m (750 ft)/ NY328063 | Rothay/ Grasmere/ NY333071 | Great Langdale/ Chapel Stile/ NY322055 | Highest of three passes. (Note: Wainwright discusses three passes running roughly parallel – via Megs Gill, Hunting Style and Red Bank.) | |
| 4/17/green Esk Hause (footpath) | 759 m (2,490 ft)/ NY233081 | Borrowdale/ Seathwaite/ NY235121 | Eskdale/ Jubilee Bridge/ NY211011 | Just north there is col by a shelter that is often wrongly called "Esk Hause". (Note: The Wasdale to Langdale route reaches the Sty Head Pass but does not descend north to Borrowdale but rather continues southeast to a high point at a col often wrongly called "Esk Hause" at NY234083 with an elevation 722 metres (2,369 ft) (near a stone shelter). Rossett Pass is then crossed. The route was used for taking smuggled goods from Ravenglass.) | |
| 4/18/red Hardknott Pass (road) | 393 m (1,289 ft)/ NY231014 | Duddon/ Cockley Beck/ NY246016 | Eskdale/ Dalegarth station/ NY174007 | Unclassified public road, the gradient reaches 1 in 3 33%. | |
| 4/19/blue Pass near Harter Fell (bridleway) | 355 m (1,165 ft)/ SD210993 | Duddon/ Seathwaite/ SD230974 | Eskdale/ Hardknott Castle/ NY213011 | | |
| 4/20/black Old Corpse Road, Wasdale (bridleway) | 298 m (978 ft)/ NY184055 | Eskdale/ Boot/ NY176012 | Wasdale/ Wasdale Head/ NY186083 | | |
| 4/21/red Red Tarn Pass (footpath) | 530 m (1,740 ft)/ NY267039 | Great Langdale/ Oxendale/ NY276056 | Little Langdale/ Three Shire Stone/ NY275026 | See Pike of Blisco and Cold Pike. | |
| 4/22/blue Rossett Pass (bridleway) | 610 m (2,000 ft)/ NY246075 | Great Langdale/ Mickleden/ NY284061 | Wasdale/ Wasdale Head; NY187086 | There is a higher col on this pass at 722 metres (2,369 ft) near Esk Hause. | |
| 4/23/green Side Gates road (road) | 224 m (735 ft)/ NY289051 | Great Langdale/ Rossett/ NY285059 | Little Langdale/ Ting Mound/ NY302033 | Also called Blea Tarn road. (Note: A bridleway takes a similar route following the road for a short distance.) | |
| 4/24/magenta Stake Pass (bridleway) | 480 m (1,570 ft)/ NY265087 | Borrowdale/ Rosthwaite/ NY259147 | Great Langdale/ Mickleden/ NY284061 | On the Cumbria Way. | |
| 4/25/green Sty Head Pass (bridleway) | 488 m (1,601 ft)/ NY218094 | Borrowdale/ Seathwaite/ NY234120 | Wasdale/ Wasdale Head/ NY187086 | Between Borrowdale and Wasdale (but also Langdale and Eskdale). (Note: From Sty Head, four valleys may be reached: (1) descent west via Styhead Pass to Wasdale, (2) descent northeast via Styhead Pass to Borrowdale, (3&4) ascent southeast to the col north of Esk Hause thence (3) up southwest over Esk Hause to Eskdale or (4) down southeast via Rossett Pass to Great Langdale.) | |
| 4/26/red Walna Scar Road (restricted byway) | 608 m (1,995 ft)/ SD258964 | Coniston Water/ Coniston/ SD301975 | Duddon/ Seathwaite/ SD232967 | Restricted byway – open to all except motor vehicles. | |
| 4/27/blue Wrynose Pass (road) | 393 m (1,289 ft)/ NY277027 | Duddon/ Cockley Beck/ NY246016 | Little Langdale/ Fell Foot/ NY300031 | Unclassified public road. | |
| 5/28/green Cumbria Way, Skiddaw Forest (bridleway) | 488 m (1,601 ft)/ NY279305 | Bassenthwaite/ Peter House Farm/ NY249323 | Greta/ Gale Road/ NY280253 | Cumbria Way via Skiddaw House. (Note: This section of the Cumbria Way passes Skiddaw House (YHA) at NY287291 470 metres (1,550 ft) passing from the Derwent Valley to the Eden Valley and back again.) | |
| 6/29/magenta Coledale Hause (footpath) | 603 m (1,978 ft)/ NY189211 | Newlands/ Braithwaite/ NY227238 | Crummock/ Lanthwaite/ NY159208 | See Coledale (Cumbria). | |
| 6/30/red Hause Gate (bridleway) | 360 m (1,180 ft)/ NY244191 | Borrowdale/ Manesty/ NY250185 | Newlands/ Little Town/ NY234195 | Lucie's path to Catbells in The Tale of Mrs. Tiggy-Winkle. | |
| 6/31/magenta Newlands Hause (road) | 333 m (1,093 ft)/ NY193176 | Newlands/ Little Town/ NY230201 | Buttermere/ (village)/ NY176170 | Unclassified road. Often called Buttermere Hause. | |
| 6/32/blue Sail Pass (footpath) | 625 m (2,051 ft)/ NY204204 | Derwent/ Braithwaite/ NY229231 | Buttermere/ (village)/ NY173171 | This pass is far higher and not much shorter than Newlands Hause. (Note: Wainwright frequently mentions this pass (he himself gave it the name). Just below the pass there used to be a cobalt mine and the mine road came from Braithwaite.) | |
| 6/33/red Whinlatter Pass (road) | 318 m (1,043 ft)/ NY205245 | Newlands/ Braithwaite/ NY230236 | Cocker/ High Lorton/ NY162258 | B5292, B road. | |
| 7/34/magenta Aaron Slack (footpath) | 750 m (2,460 ft)/ NY214105 | Ennerdale/ Black Sail Hut/ NY194123 | Borrowdale/ Styhead Tarn/ (Note: Styhead Tarn is at 440 metres (1,440 ft) and a short ascent reaches Sty Head); NY234120 | High point at Windy Gap. (Note: Only the Windy Gap to Styhead Tarn section is called Aaron Slack (slack means scree).) Nearby is Sty Head with four onward routes. | |
| 7/35/black Black Sail Pass (bridleway) | 545 m (1,788 ft)/ NY191114 | Wasdale/ Wasdale Head/ NY186087 | Ennerdale/ Black Sail Hut/ NY194123 | Black Sail Hut is a Youth Hostel. | |
| 7/36/green Floutern Tarn Pass (bridleway) | 416 m (1,365 ft)/ NY121172 | Buttermere/ (village)/ NY175169 | Ennerdale/ Whins/ NY098167 | Goes near Scale Force. | |
| 7/37/green Floutern Tarn Pass (bridleway) | 416 m (1,365 ft)/ NY121172 | Loweswater/ (village)/ NY141209 | Ennerdale/ Whins/ NY098167 | A branch off the pass going to Buttermere. | |
| 7/38/red Honister Pass (road) | 356 m (1,168 ft)/ NY224136 | Borrowdale/ Seatoller/ NY245136 | Buttermere/ Gatesgarth/ NY195149 | B5289, B road. (Note: A toll road ran from Grange to near Honister Hause but it is now a bridleway.) | |
| 7/39/magenta Moses Trod (footpath) | 660 m (2,170 ft)/ NY209119 | Borrowdale/ Honister Hause/ NY225135 | Wasdale/ Wasdale Head/ NY186088 | An abandoned track for transporting slate. (Note: Until about 1850 Moses Trod was used to transport slate from high-level quarries at Honister over to Wasdale. Although the route is also called the "Moses Sledgate" (gate is a path), it seems packhorses were used rather than sledges.) | |
| 7/40/blue Scarth Gap Pass (bridleway) | 445 m (1,460 ft)/ NY189133 | Buttermere/ Gatesgarth/ NY194150 | Ennerdale/ Black Sail Hut/ NY194123 | | |

=== Notes for table header ===
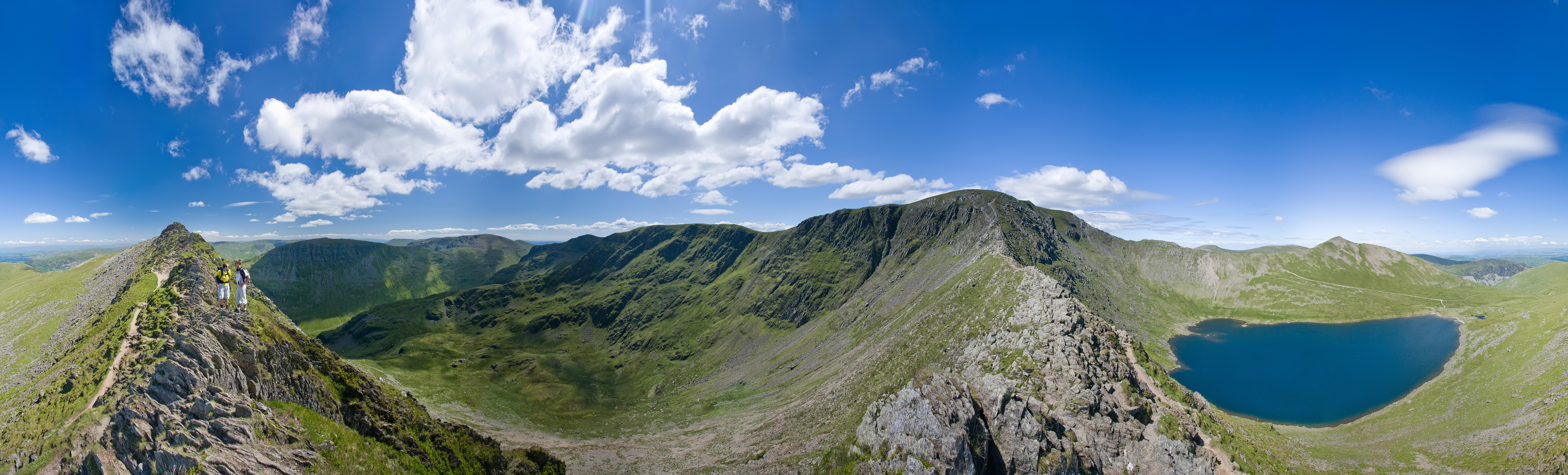
360° panorama from Striding Edge, leading up to Helvellyn

== Selection criteria ==
The hill passes listed are routes within the Lake District National Park between two different valleys where a pathway is marked on the Ordnance Survey 1:50000 or 1:25000 map. Passes to be considered may be listed as "pass" or "hause" in the Ordnance Survey 1:50000 gazetteer provided also that a route crossing the ridge is marked on the map. Also included are routes described as passes in Wainwright's Guides and in other authoritative sources provided still that they go between different valleys. To be listed a pass does not necessarily have a name (though most do have names) nor does it need to cross a col (but nearly all do traverse cols). A few have been excluded when the gain in elevation seems rather small (less than about 100 metres (330 ft) – this particularly applies with paved roads.
