= Beda Fell =

Fell in the Lake District, Cumbria, England

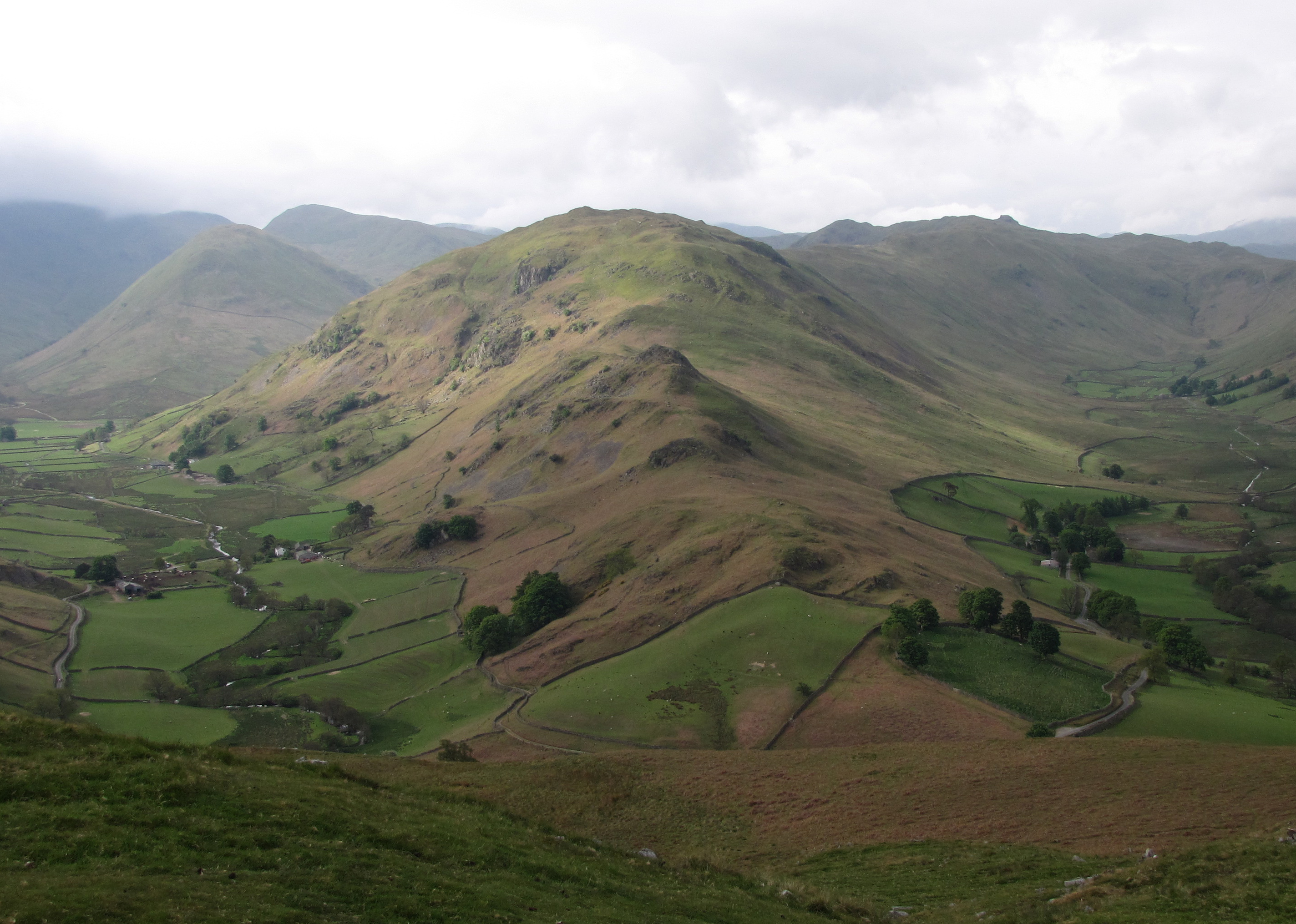
- Seen from Hallin Fell, 3 km to the north.

Highest point
- Elevation: 509 m (1,670 ft)
- Prominence: c. 60 m
- Parent peak: Angletarn Pikes
- Listing: Wainwright
- Coordinates: 54°32′45″N 2°53′14″W

Geography
- Location within the Lake District
- Location: Cumbria, England
- Parent range: Lake District, Far Eastern Fells
- OS grid: NY427171
- Topo map: OS Explorer OL5

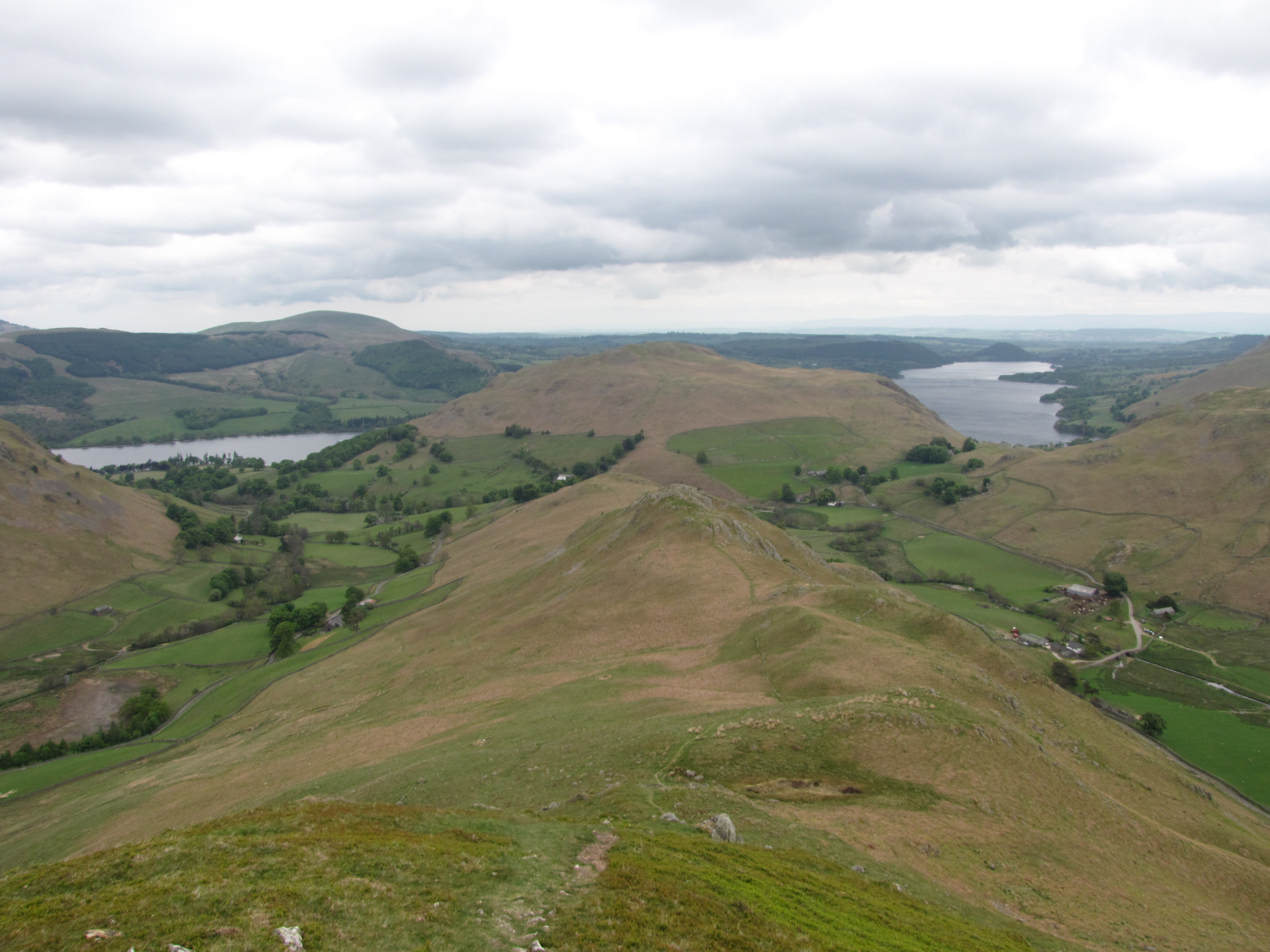
The view north from the summit takes in Hallin Fell and Ullswater.

Beda Fell is a fell in the English Lake District, situated to the south of Ullswater. It divides the valleys of Boredale and Bannerdale within the Martindale system.

== Topography ==
The southern boundary of the Martindale catchment is formed by a long ridge running from Rampsgill Head to Place Fell. Spurs run north from here to separate the individual valleys and Beda Fell is one of these. Starting from its parent fell of Angletarn Pikes, the spur runs north for around two and a half miles before dropping to valley level close to Sandwick. Part way along, Beda Fell broadens and rises to its summit, the top being named as Beda Head.

The top of the ridge is grassy, but the flanks are universally steep with considerable areas of crag. The western Boredale side is fairly straight, with Brock Crag below the summit and Low Brock Crag further north. The eastern flank bows outward around the summit area as the fell widens and then narrows again. Bannerdale runs below the southern slopes on this side, before merging with Rampsgill to form Howe Grain on the journey to Ullswater. Just north of the summit are Allen Crag, Ewe Crag, Raven Crag and Thrang Crag, falling in tiers from the ridge. Further on, above Howe Grain, are more rock faces at Nickles, Halstead Brow and Winter Crag.

Descending from Angletarn Pikes, Beda Fell begins as a series of rocky knolls on a narrowing ridge. The last of these is Bedafell Knott at 1,580 ft, after which grass generally prevails. A double depression at 1,460 ft is crossed before the ridge climbs to Beda Head, the summit of the fell. Passing north from here the ridge narrows dramatically between the crags and falls to the unenclosed road from Howtown to Sandwick, finally reaching valley level at the confluence of Howe Grain and Boredale.

== Summit ==
Beda Head is a grassy mound with a small cairn. There is a good view of the surrounding high fells, but the wideness of the ridge hides much of the neighbouring valleys. Ullswater is visible, either side of Hallin Fell.

== Ascents ==
Beda Fell can be climbed straight up the ridge from the road. This walk can also be started from a quarter mile up either Boredale or Howe Grain, a path traversing the fell just below the subsidiary summit topping Winter Crag. A good path continues southward from the summit to reach Angletarn Pikes. The ridge is also crossed near Bedafell Knott by a bridleway from Patterdale (via Boredale Hause) to the end of the bannerdale road at Dale Head Farm.

Another route is to take the upper path at the back of Winter Crag Farm, heading northward through bracken to the first top on the ridge, then walking southwards along and up the ridge to Beda Fell Knott. Descent can be made by reversing this route, or by walking on over Angle Tarn Pikes then descending southward to Patterdale where there is a steamer that carries passengers across Ullswater to Howtown from Glenridding.
