= Steel Knotts =

Mountain in Cumbria, England

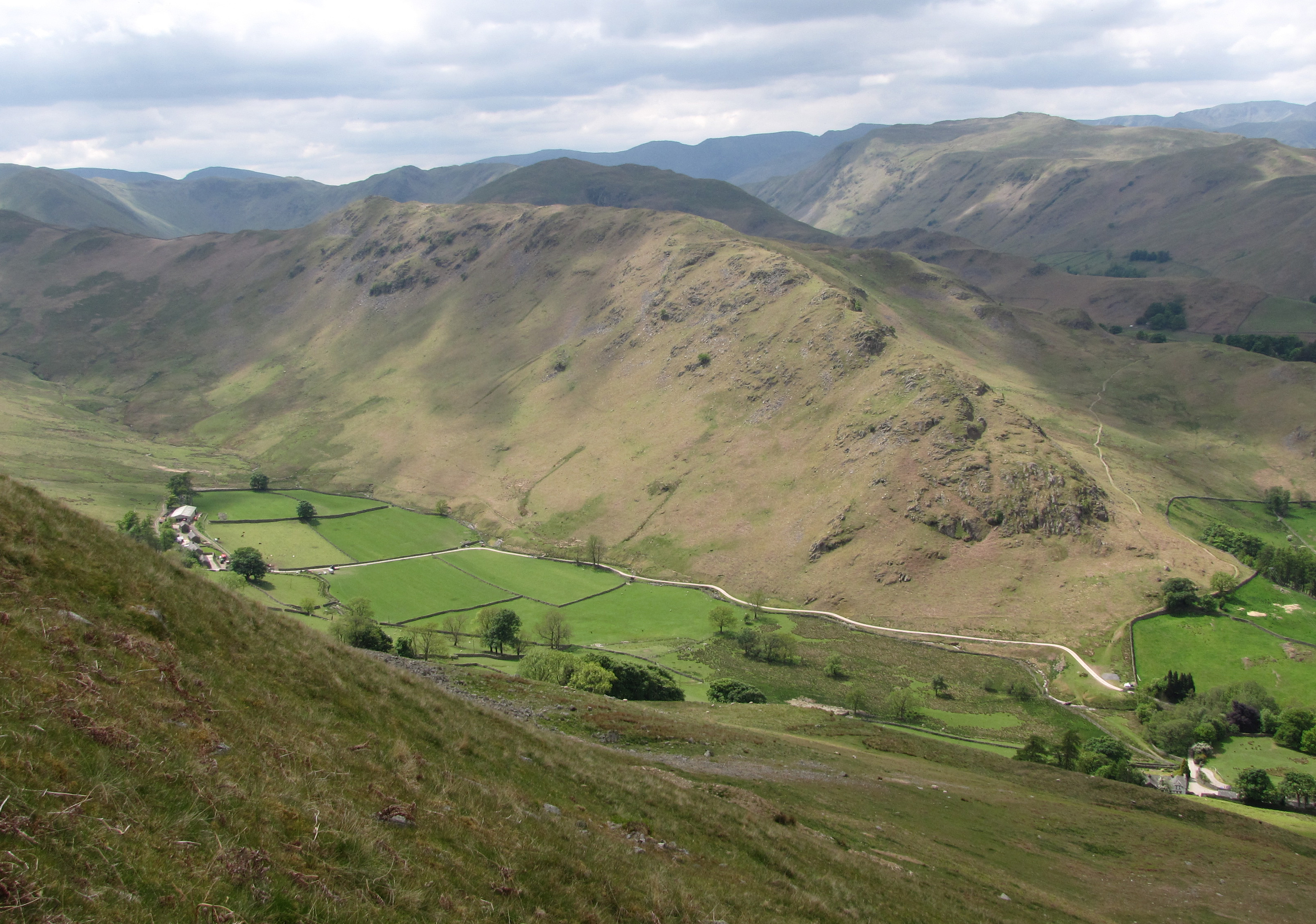
- Seen across Fusedale from the slopes of Bonscale Pike.

Highest point
- Elevation: 432 m (1,417 ft)
- Prominence: c. 45 m
- Parent peak: High Raise
- Listing: Wainwright
- Coordinates: 54°33′18″N 2°52′03″W

Geography
- Location within the Lake District
- Location: Cumbria, England
- Parent range: Lake District, Far Eastern Fells
- OS grid: NY440181
- Topo map: OS Explorer OL5

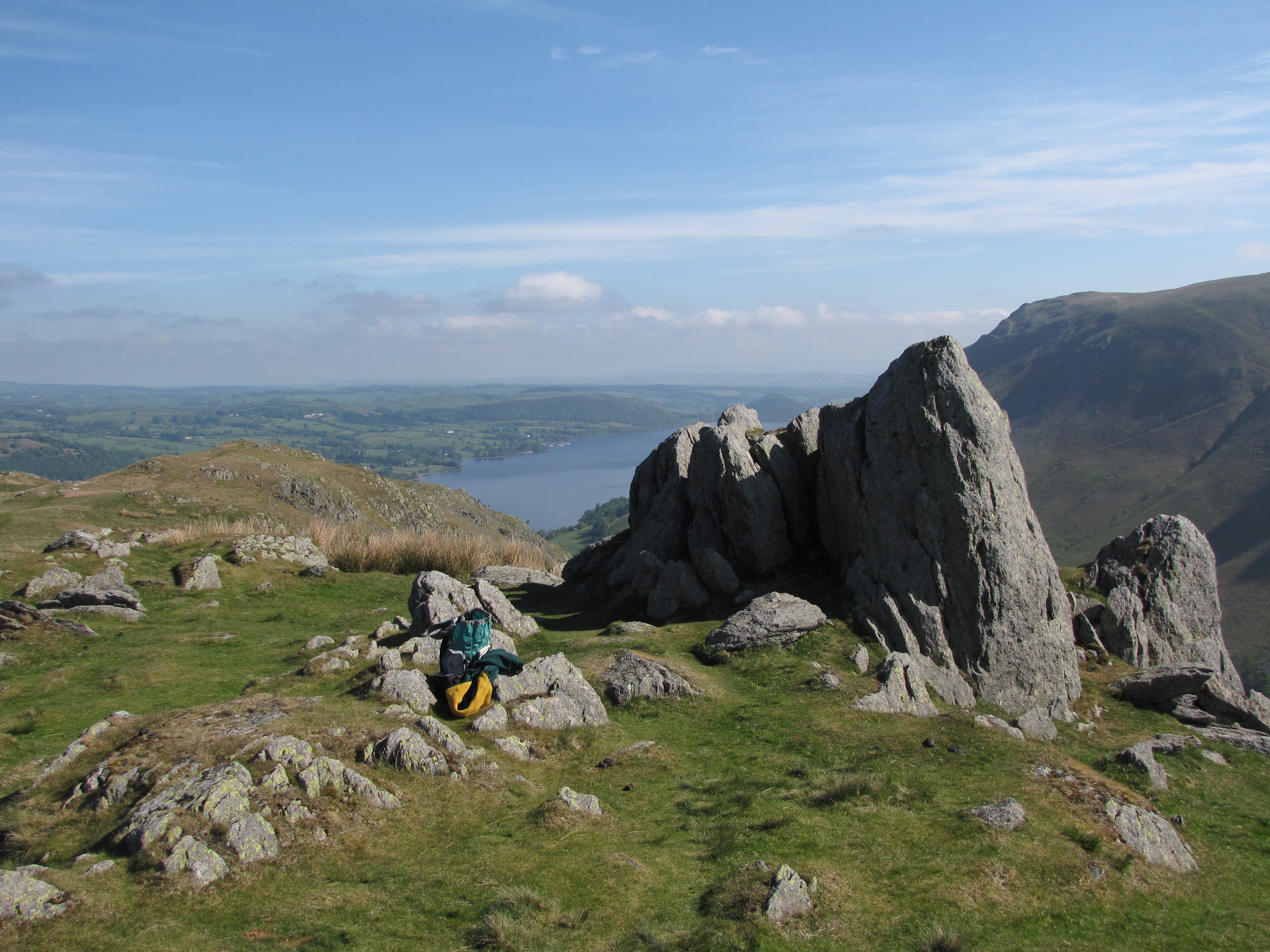
The summit rocks of Steel Knotts with Ullswater in the background.

Steel Knotts is a fell in the English Lake District, near to Ullswater in the Far Eastern Fells. It stands between the valleys of Fusedale and Martindale on a ridge running north–south.

== Topography ==
At Wether Hill on the spine of the Far Eastern Fells, a subsidiary spur branches off west to Gowk Hill, before turning north to run parallel to the main ridge. This passes over Brownthwaite Crag (444 metres (1,456 ft)) and the rockier top of Steel Knotts before swinging a little to the east and making a brisk descent to Howtown and Ullswater.

The Steel Knotts ridge, also termed Martindale Edge, runs for about two miles in total. To the east is the steep sided valley of Fusedale, its beck forming the boundary of the fell. This flows north to the Lake at Howtown, below the nose of the ridge. There are some crags on this side, particularly at the northern end. The western flank of the fell has shallower gradients at the top before dropping over rough ground to Martindale. The boundary here is made by Howegrain Beck which carries the waters of Bannerdale and Rampsgill Dale to the lake at Sandwick.

Running off north west from the top of Steel Knotts is a truncated ridge which falls quickly over Birkies Knott to valley level. Here the Martindale road is crossed at The Coombes before the land rises again to Hallin Fell, overlooking Ullswater from its fine position between Sandwick and Howtown. Topographically Hallin Fell is the true continuation of Steel Knotts, although the eye naturally gives this distinction to the narrow ridge descending to Howtown.

== Summit ==
Steel Knotts has a summit pinnacle which is named Pikeawassa. This provides a scramble to finish a walk. The view of Martindale includes the Helvellyn range.

== Ascents ==
The fell can be climbed from Howtown or from The Coombes and St Peter's church at the top of the horseshoes on the Martindale road. The ridge can also be reached just south of the summit from Martindale Old Church, or at Gowk Hill via Fusedale.
