= Boredale Hause =

Coordinates: 54.533°N 2.916°W

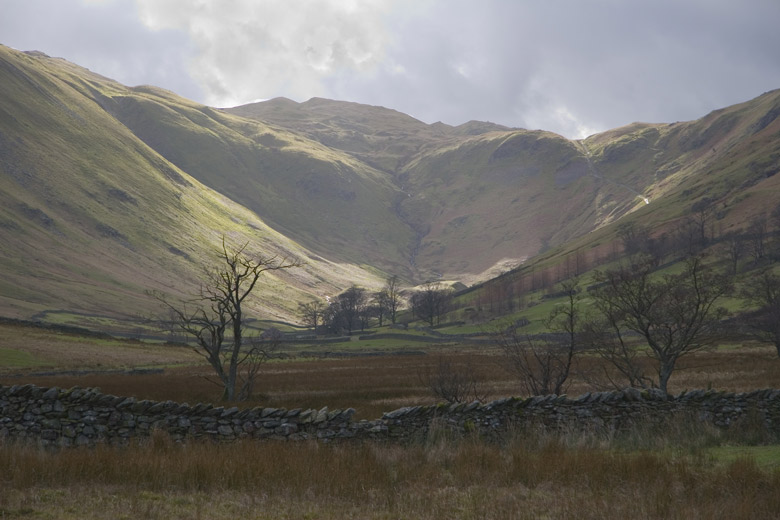
Viewed from Boredale

Boredale Hause is a mountain pass between Place Fell and Angletarn Pikes in the east of the English Lake District. It links the Patterdale and Boredale valleys. There is a large confusion of paths on the hause, which is largely grassy.

== See also ==
- List of hill passes of the Lake District
