= Angletarn Pikes =

Fell in the Lake District, Cumbria, England

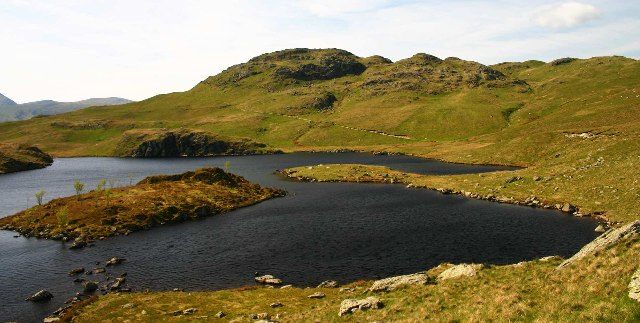
- Angle Tarn and Angletarn Pikes

Highest point
- Elevation: 567 m (1,860 ft)
- Prominence: c. 80 metres (260 ft)
- Parent peak: Rest Dodd
- Listing: Wainwright
- Coordinates: 54°31′30″N 2°54′30″W

Geography
- Location within the Lake District
- Location: Cumbria, England
- Parent range: Lake District, Far Eastern Fells
- OS grid: NY413148
- Topo map: OS Explorer OL5

Angletarn Pikes is a fell in the English Lake District near the village of Patterdale. Its most notable feature is Angle Tarn from which it derives its name.

== Topography ==
Angletarn Pikes stands on the western arm of the long horseshoe ridge which surrounds the Martindale catchment, a system of valleys draining north into Ullswater. The adjacent fells on this ridge are Place Fell to the north and Brock Crags to the south. Beda Fell, a subsidiary ridge, also juts out into Martindale from Angletarn Pikes. This separates the heads of Boredale and Bannerdale.

The western side above Goldrill Beck is steep and includes the faces of Dubhow and Fall Crags. The long eastern flank above Bannerdale is also pock-marked with crags, Heck Crag being the principal feature. The narrow north eastern slopes above Boredale, although steep, are less rocky and are cut by the upper ravine of Freeze Beck.

North from the summit a long ridge drops over Stony Rigg (1,640 feet, 500 m) to the walkers’ crossroads of Boredale Hause. From here paths run down to Hartsop, Patterdale and Boredale, while a further bridleway cuts across Beda Fell to Bannerdale. Boredale Hause carries the tiny ruin of a building named ‘Chapel in the Hause’ on OS maps. A mountain pass at 1,300 feet (400 m) seems a curious place to construct a church. From the Hause a good path carries on northwards up Steel Edge to Place Fell.

The north-east ridge to Beda Fell is also well defined, a fair path traversing a series of rocky knolls before the final rise to the summit, named Beda Head.

Southward from Angletarn Pikes is Angle Tarn itself. This indented waterbody is about a quarter of a mile long with an island in the middle and forms a picturesque foreground for views of the Pikes. The tarn sits in a hollow on the centre of the ridge, issuing westwards through a break in the parapet via the ravine of Angletarn Beck. The ridge proper runs to the east of the tarn above the Bannerdale face, rising again to the unnamed 1,870 feet (570 m) top above Satura Crag. This overtops the summit of Brock Crags, but was made subservient to it by Wainwright in his Pictorial Guide to the Lakeland Fells.

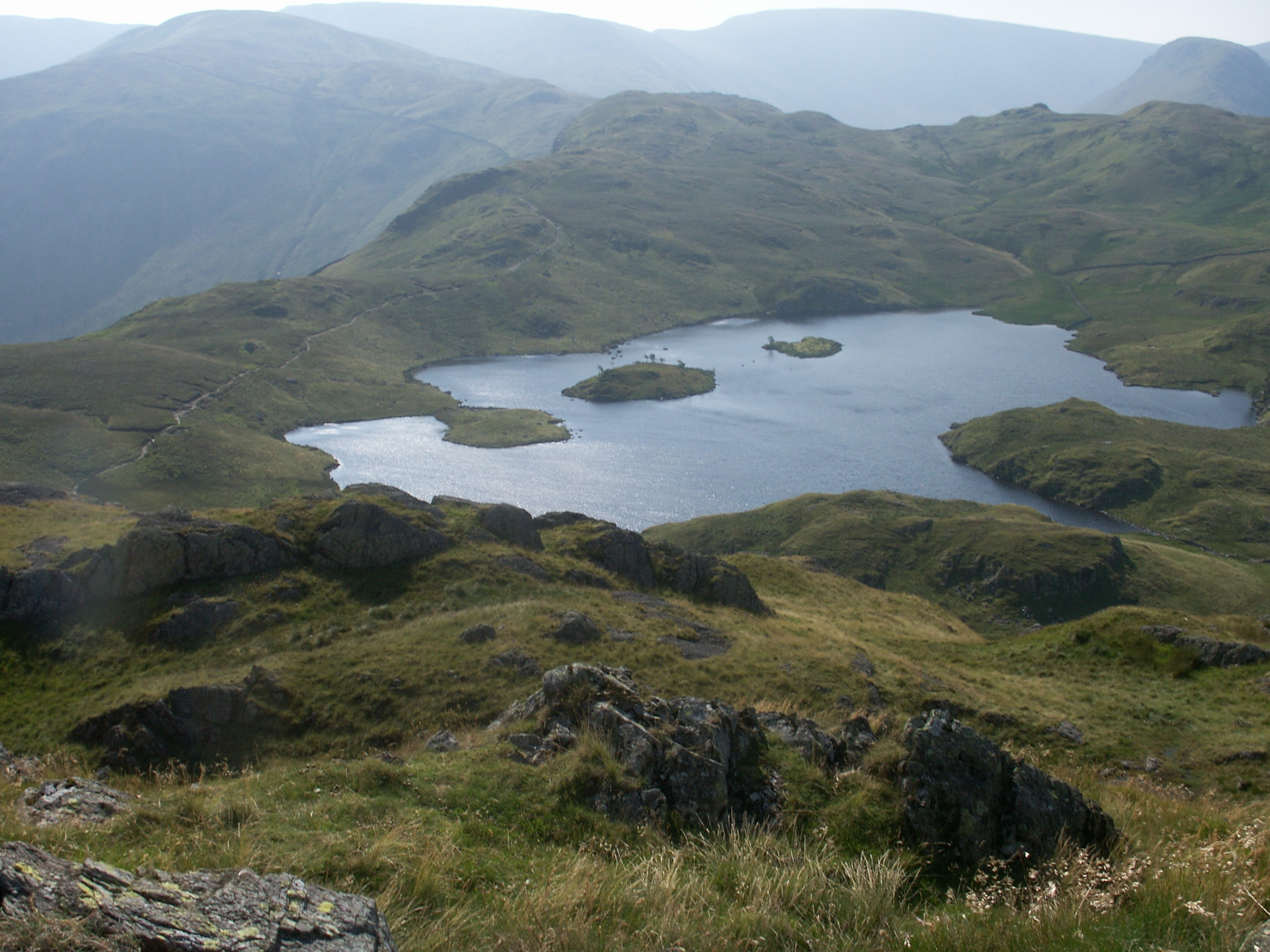
Angle Tarn from the south summit

== Summit and view ==
Angletarn Pikes takes its plural from the two rocky towers at the summit, separated by perhaps 200 yards of peaty bog. The northern top is the true summit, the other being some six feet lower. The southern top is compensated by a clear view of Angle Tarn, described by Wainwright as among the best of Lakeland tarns. The wider view stretches from the Helvellyn range to the spine of the Far Eastern Fells across Martindale.

== Ascents ==
The fell can be climbed via Boredale Hause, making Patterdale, Bridgend, Hartsop and Boredale Head all possible starting points. An alternative is to climb from Martindale Old Church, ascending via the Beda Fell ridge or Angle Tarn. The route from Patterdale is often undertaken as the first section of the ascent of High Street.
