= Esk Hause =

Coordinates: 54.4626°N 3.1854°W

Esk Hause is a mountain pass in the English Lake District, England. It is where the paths from Eskdale, Borrowdale, Langdale and Wasdale all meet. Esk Hause is a first step to reaching higher summits, such as Scafell Pike, Great End, Esk Pike and Allen Crags, which are all nearby. This can be a confusing place for walkers, especially in mist. This is because two paths cross at right angles on a tilted grass plateau, but not at the summit of the plateau. The popular Great Langdale-Wasdale path crosses at an elevation of 727 m (2,386 ft) at the wall shelter; this is the lower of the two passes known as Esk Hause, but is, in fact, not the true pass, which is 30 m (100 ft) higher and 270 m (300 yd) distant, a less-used pass between Eskdale and Borrowdale that occupies the depression between Great End (910 m or 2,984 ft) and Esk Pike (885 m or 2,903 ft). The 'true' Esk Hause is the highest pass in the Lake District (20 m or 70 ft higher than Sticks Pass which crosses the Helvellyn range near Stybarrow Dodd), but Sticks Pass is commonly named as Lakeland's highest pass, most probably because fellwalkers equate "Esk Hause" with the lower of the two passes.

The source of the River Esk is close to Esk Hause.

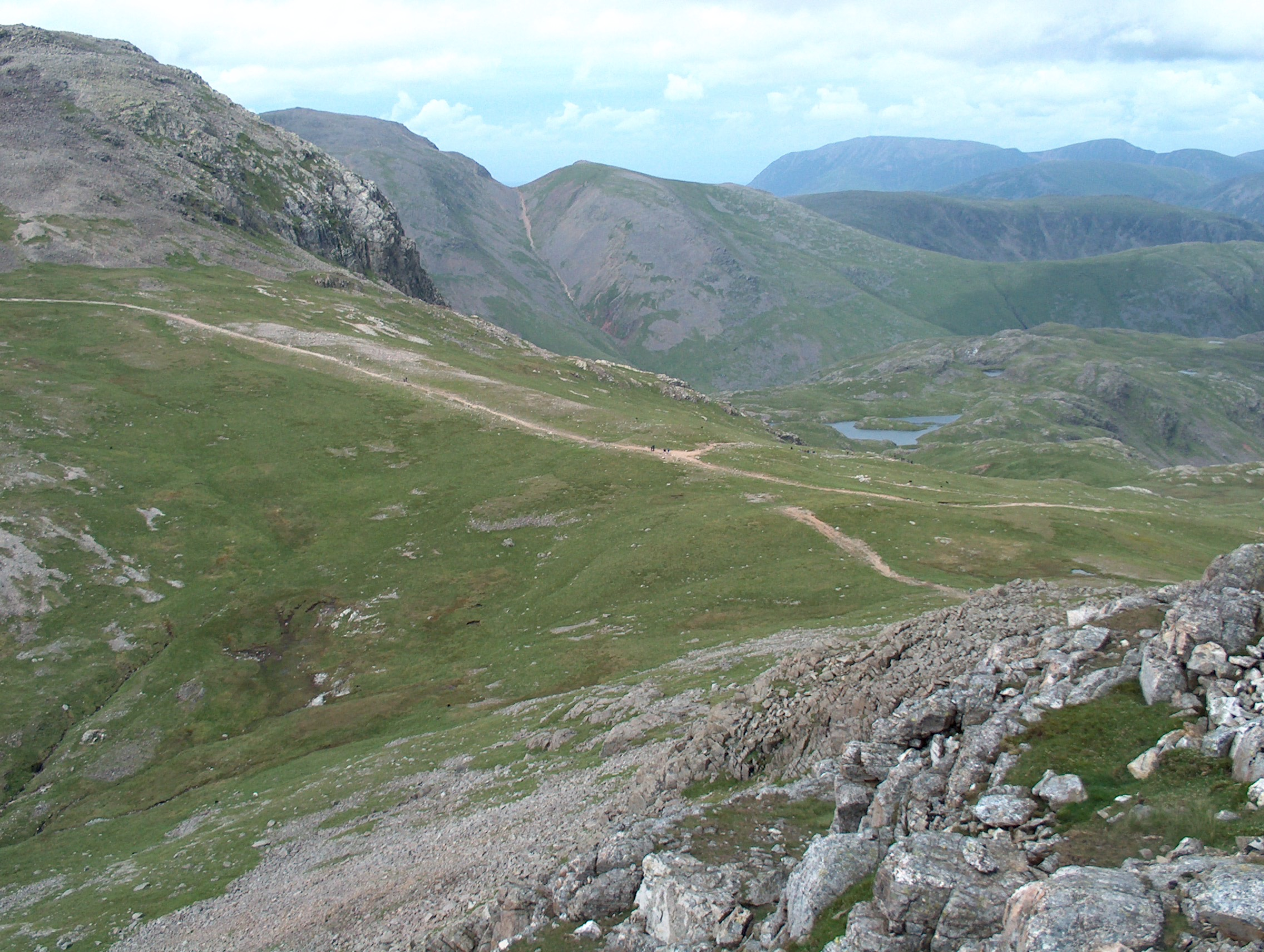
Esk Hause as seen from Esk Pike.

== See also ==
- List of hill passes of the Lake District
