= Hallin Fell =

Mountain in Cumbria, England

- Location within the Lake District

Highest point
- Elevation: 388 m (1,273 ft)
- Prominence: 163 m (535 ft)
- Parent peak: High Street
- Listing: Marilyn, Wainwright
- Coordinates: 54°34′14″N 2°52′35″W

Geography
- Location: Cumbria, England
- Parent range: Lake District, Far Eastern Fells
- OS grid: NY433198
- Topo map: OS Explorer OL5

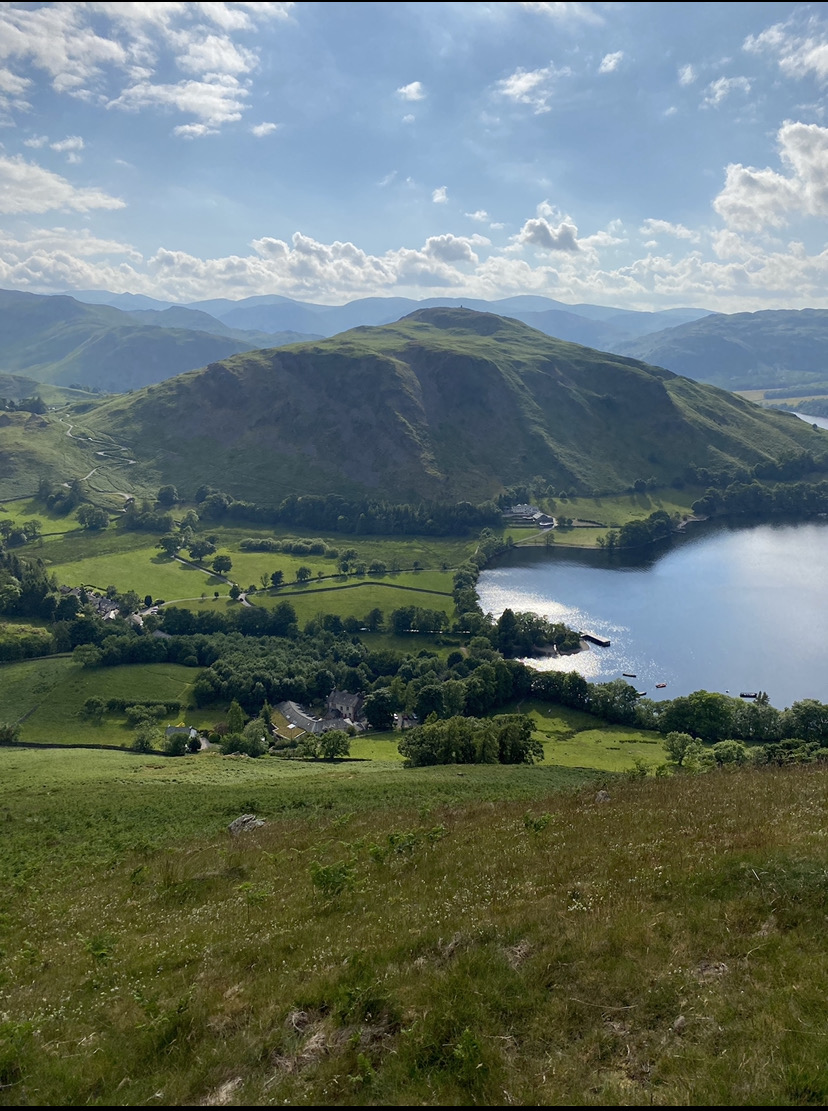
Hallin Fell photographed whilst walking down from Bonscale Pike

Hallin Fell is a hill in the English Lake District surrounded on three sides by Ullswater.

== Topography ==
The fell is a continuation of the ridge leading down from Steel Knotts, but the depression at The Hause is so profound that Hallin Fell appears totally independent in almost any view. This is born out by its status as a Marilyn, despite being diminutive amongst Lakeland fells.

Hallin Fell stands like a plug in the outlet of the Martindale valley system. The outflows of Rampsgill, Bannerdale and Boredale are deflected west around the fell, eventually finding the shore of Ullswater at Sandwick. Fusedale and the little valley above Howtown drain around the east of the fell to meet the Lake at Howtown Wyke. The southern boundaries of the fell are therefore easily defined by these watercourses and the Howtown to Sandwick road with its ferocious hairpin climb to The Hause.

The fell is circular in plan with smooth slopes to the south and west. Wainwright famously claimed that the southern side could be "ascended comfortably in bare feet". There is rougher ground on the other sides and Hallin Fell's northernmost extremity — Geordie's Crag — projects into the lake, separating Ullswater's middle and lower reaches.

== Summit ==
The top is grassy with a number of small knolls and some outcropping rock. The highest point has an imposing square sectioned columnar cairn, and there are many other small cairns at other vantage points. Like many shorter hills in mountainous areas, the views from the summit are excellent, and Hallin Fell commands views across Martindale Common, High Street, Helvellyn, Blencathra and Ullswater.

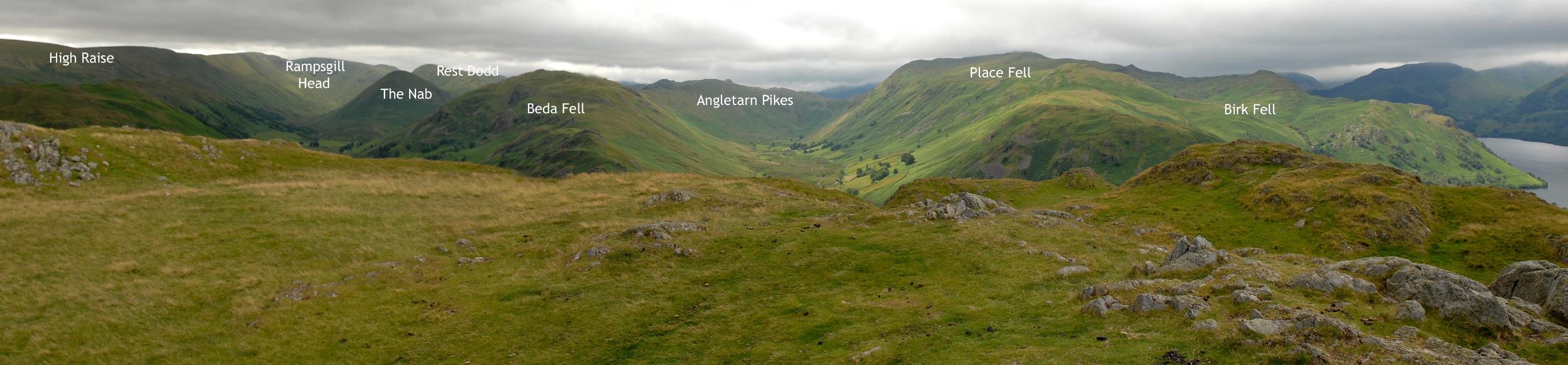
View southwest over Martindale from Hallin Fell with captioned fell names. Ullswater can be seen on the right of the picture.

== Ascents ==
The climb from Howtown to the obelisk at the summit is short and easy; there are also multiple paths up from St Peter's Church at The Hause and from Howtown hamlet. Around the northern side of the fell is part of the popular lakeside walk from Howtown to Patterdale. This route, mainly in wooded surroundings and with some gentle scrambling over outcrops, can be combined with a trip on the Ullswater steamer to provide a fine low-level excursion.

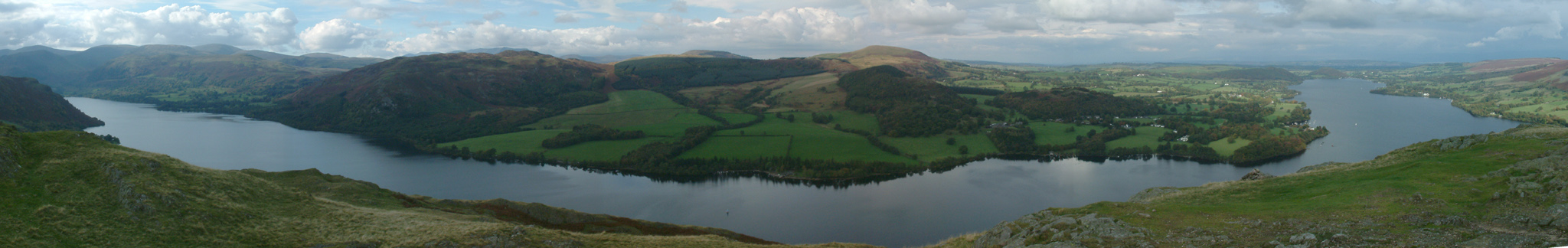
View of Ullswater from Hallin Fell — visible hills include Blencathra, Gowbarrow Fell and Little Mell Fell
