= Boredale =

Valley in Cumbria, England

Coordinates: 54.5592°N 2.8865°W

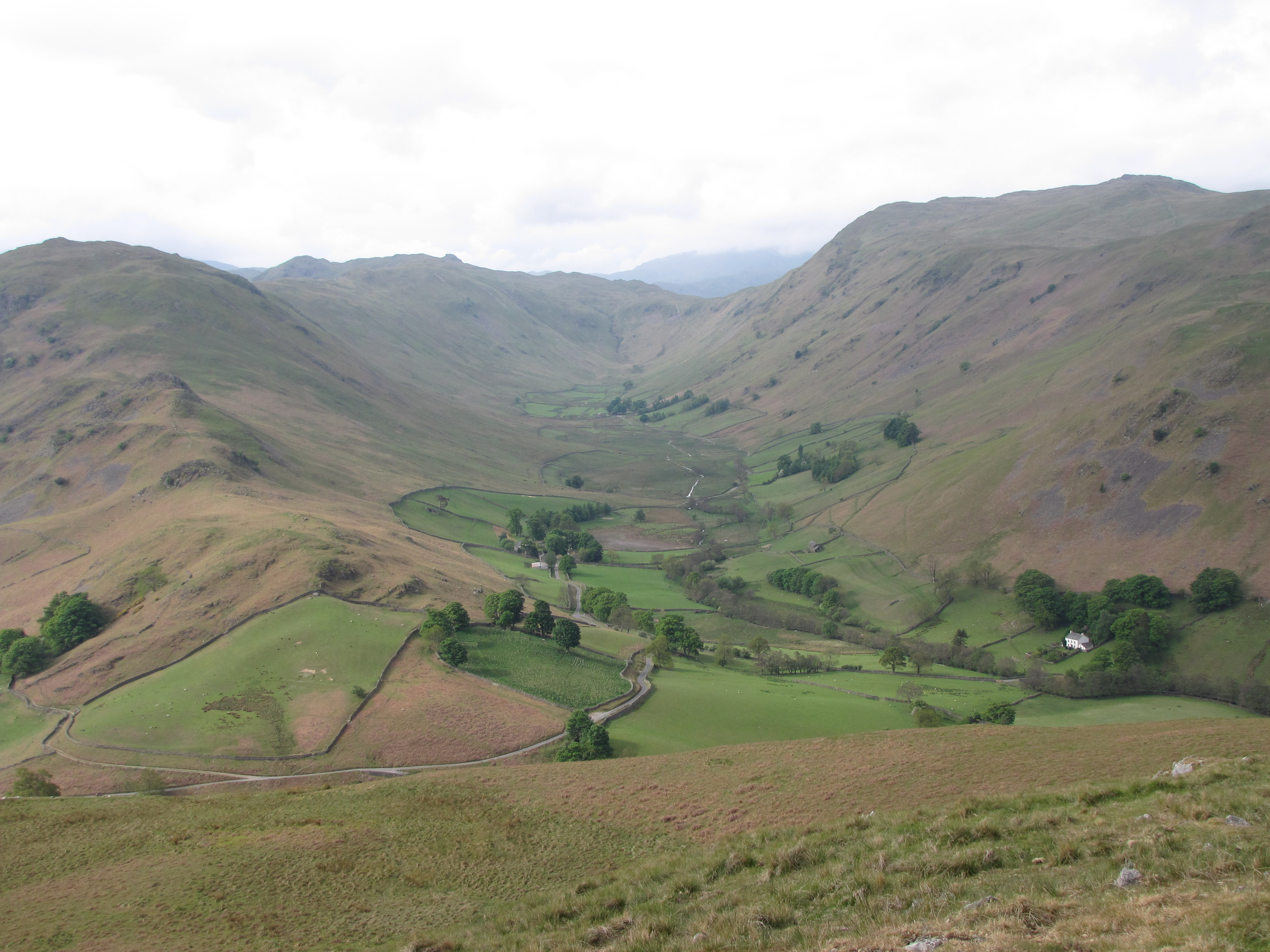
Seen from Hallin Fell with Place Fell on the right and Beda Fell on the left.

Boredale sometimes known as Boardale, is a valley within Lake District National Park, in Cumbria, England. The valley is close to the eastern shore of Ullswater and lies between the hills of Place Fell to the west and Beda Fell to the east.

Boredale runs in a northerly direction for a distance of 4.5 km from its head at Boredale Hause to its convergence with the valley of Martindale. It is a thinly populated valley with the structures of Garth Heads, Howsteadbrow, Nettleslack and Boredale Head being the only inhabited buildings in the valley. The traditional stone and slate Nettleslack cottage dates from 1756, it was modernised in 1997 and is now rented out as holiday accommodation. There is a narrow tarmac road which runs up the valley for 2.5 km until it reaches the farm of Boredale Head, from here the road becomes a bridleway which climbs up on to the fells and reaches Boredale Hause at a height of 399 metres. Footpaths also leave the valley at the farm buildings of Garths Head and climb the hillsides to reach the summits of Place Fell and Beda Fell.

The name of the valley means “valley with the herdman's hut or storehouse”, the linguistic source of this uncertain, coming either from the Old Norse word bur or the Old English word bir. In the year 1250 the valley was known as Burdal. Renowned Lake District writers William Wordsworth and Alfred Wainwright both used the incorrect spelling and usage of “Boardale” believing that it referred to pigs. Wainwright in his book “In The Valleys Of Lakeland” refers to Boredale as “unexciting but heaven is glimpsed on the approach and exit”. The valley is drained by Boredale Beck which rises on the slopes of Angletarn Pikes at height of 500 metres and flows northerly for five km to its confluence with Howegrain Beck, the main water course of the Martindale valley.
