= Esk Pike =

Fell in the Lake District, Cumbria, England

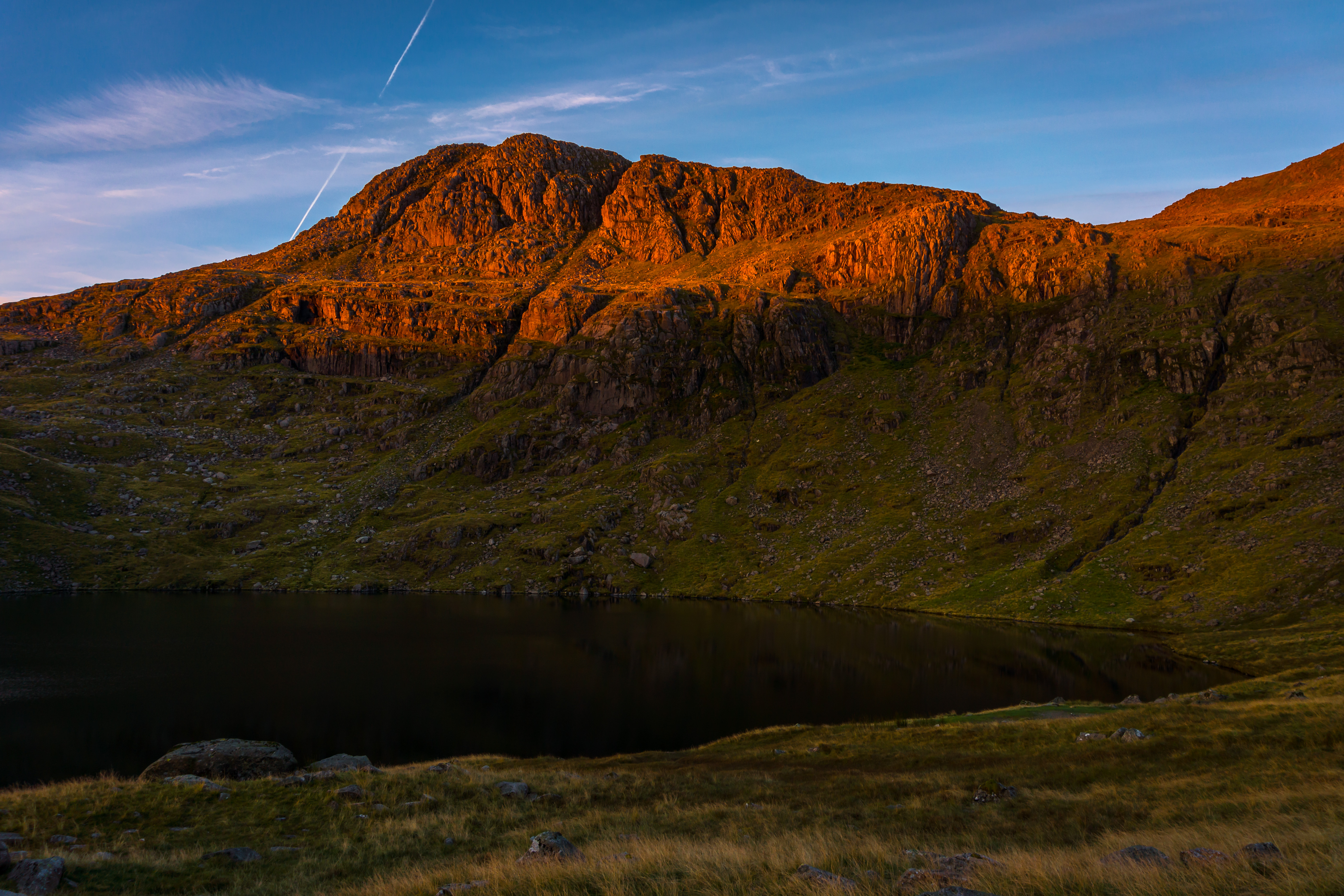
- Esk Pike at sunrise

Highest point
- Elevation: 885 m (2,904 ft)
- Prominence: 105 m (344 ft)
- Parent peak: Bowfell
- Listing: Hewitt, Nuttall, Wainwright
- Coordinates: 54°27′22″N 3°10′48″W

Geography
- Location within the Lake District Location within the former Allerdale Borough Location within the former Borough of Copeland
- Location: Cumbria, England
- Parent range: Lake District, Southern Fells
- OS grid: NY236074
- Topo map: OS Landrangers 89, 90, Explorer OL6

Esk Pike is a fell in the English Lake District, one of the cirque of hills forming the head of Eskdale.

== Topography ==
The Southern Fells include the highest ground in England, a horseshoe which begins with Scafell and Scafell Pike in the west and then curves around the north of Upper Eskdale to take in Great End, Esk Pike, Bow Fell and Crinkle Crags. As the name suggests, Esk Pike stands at the head of the valley, although it is not the highest of these fells.

To the north-west of Esk Pike is the depression of Esk Hause, a broad saddle carrying a number of important paths. The ‘true’ Esk Hause—so named by Alfred Wainwright in his influential Pictorial Guide to the Lakeland Fells—is the north–south route from Borrowdale to Eskdale. A lower path—the ‘false’ Hause—runs east–west from Langdale to Wasdale, passing a stone windshelter. There are also paths climbing to the summits of Esk Pike and Allen Crags, together with the popular Calf Cove route to Scafell Pike, all contributing to make Esk Hause a confusing place in mist. The source of the main branch of the Esk flows south from the Hause, while to the north the topography is more complex. Allen Crags stands adrift from the main ridge, with the valleys of Langstrath and Grains Gill falling on either side. These combine some miles downstream to form the River Derwent, flowing through Borrowdale to Derwentwater and Keswick.

South-east of the summit of Esk Pike is Ore Gap, the col separating it from Bow Fell. The soil here is red due to haematite, and climbing lore suggests that magnetic compasses cannot be trusted in this locality. North of the gap is Angle Tarn, a feeder of the Langstrath. This round tarn occupies a corrie beneath Hanging Knotts, small trout lurking in its 50 foot (15 m) depths.

Southward from the summit, Esk Pike throws out a long descending ridge into the uninhabited fastness of Upper Eskdale. This divides the Esk from its major upper tributary, Lingcove Beck, which has its beginnings at Ore Gap. Two miles (3.2 km) in length, this ridge falls over a series of craggy steps to the confluence of the two streams at Lingcove Bridge. An old Packhorse Bridge, this is a focal point for those approaching from the south, particularly when the Esk is in spate. The south ridge has a number of subsidiary tops which are recognised by some guidebooks, the principal summits being Pike de Bield 2,657 feet (810 m), Scar Lathing 1,440 feet (440 m) and Throstlehow Crag 1,325 feet (404 m). Scar Lathing is particularly impressive, presenting sheer cliffs above a bend in the Esk. Although of minor significance Pianet Knott on the eastern side of the ridge also has a very striking appearance from lower down the valley.

== Geology ==
Laminated volcaniclastic claystones and siltstones of the Esk Pike Formation form the upper reaches, crossed by an intrusion of andesite and hybridized andesite porphyry.

== Summit ==
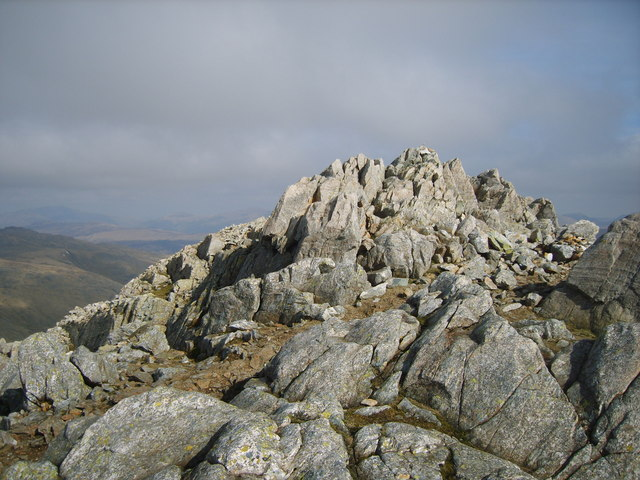
Summit of Esk Pike.

The summit area is extremely stony, striking pale rocks being much in evidence. A series of steps rise up from Ore Gap whilst the approach from Esk Hause is rough and eroded. A small cairn on the highest craggy outcrop marks the highest point. Esk Pike's central position above Eskdale gives it glorious views of the Scafells, with the Eastern and Northern Fells also forming a fine panorama. Derwentwater and a section of Windermere complete the scene. A little to the south, Pike de Bield provides an intimate view of the upper Esk.

== Ascents ==
Being far from any roads, all ascents of Esk Pike involve considerable distance by Cumbrian standards. From Brotherilkeld on the Eskdale road the climber can choose between Ore Gap, Esk Hause and the south ridge, all of these options being around five and a half miles (9 km). Borrowdale gives a choice of starting points, either making for Esk Hause from Seathwaite, or Ore Gap from Stonethwaite. Access is also possible from Great Langdale, ascending Rossett Gill from the Old Hotel. Many walkers will reach the summit indirectly having climbed Bow Fell first via the Band, or perhaps climbed from Borrowdale over Glaramara and Allen Crags.
