= Allen Crags =

Mountain in the English Lake District, Cumbria, England

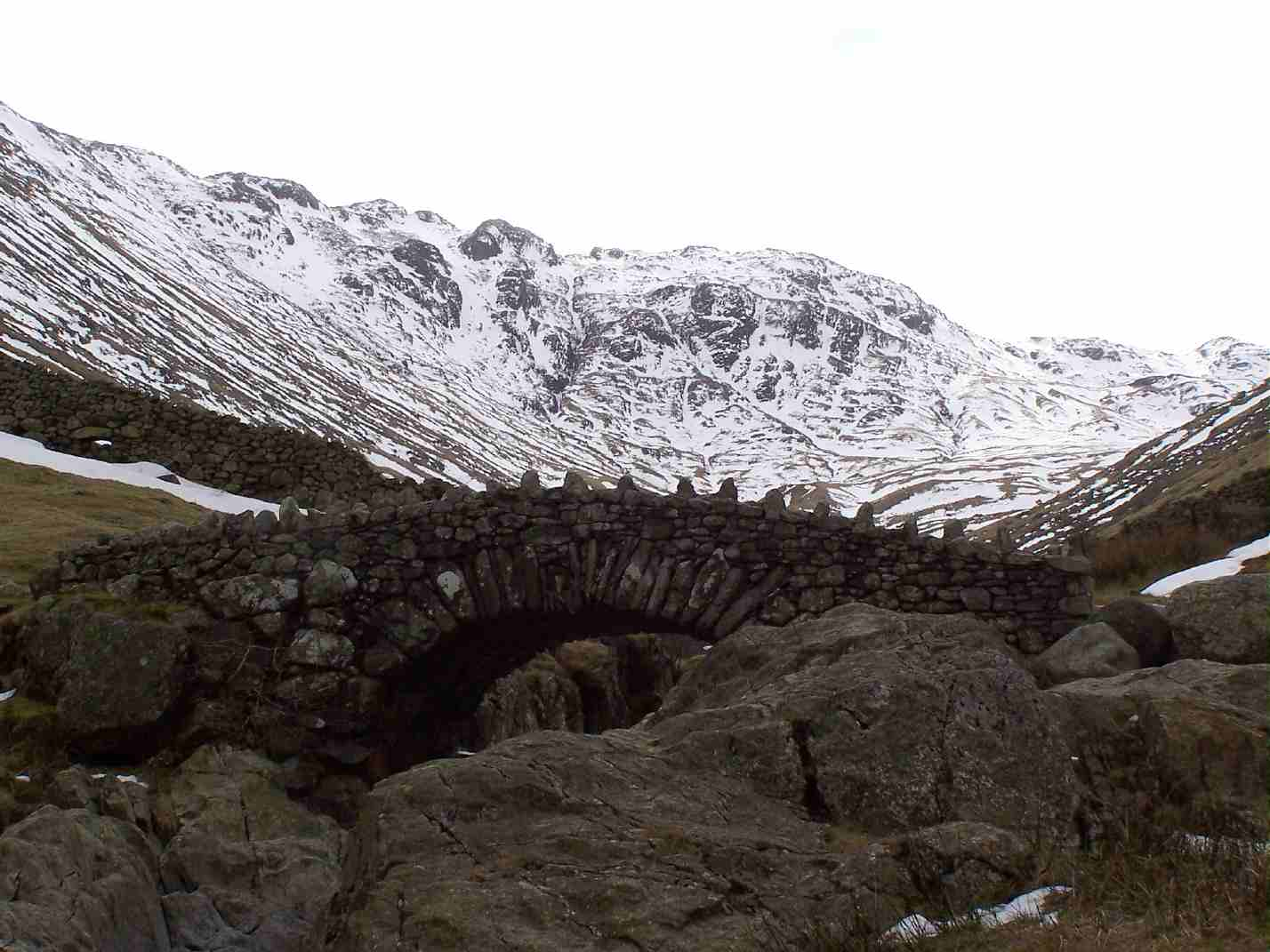
- Allen Crags from Stockley bridge near Seathwaite.

Highest point
- Elevation: 785 m (2,575 ft)
- Prominence: 60 m (200 ft)
- Parent peak: Scafell Pike
- Listing: Hewitt, Nuttall, Wainwright
- Coordinates: 54°27′58″N 3°10′49″W

Geography
- Location within the Lake District Location within the former Allerdale Borough
- Location: Cumbria, England
- Parent range: Lake District Southern Fells
- OS grid: NY236085
- Topo map: OS Landranger 90, 89 OS Explorer 4, 6

Allen Crags is a fell in the English Lake District, it lies in a group of very popular hills and is regarded as part of the Scafell group of fells. It is a hill that is frequently traversed by walkers along its ridge but is seldom climbed as the sole objective.

== Name ==
The name originates from “Alein” or “Aleyn” which was a popular personal name after the Norman conquest of England, it is of Breton origin and the fell was named after an unknown French conqueror.

== Topography ==
Allen Crags is situated at the southern end of a 6 kilometres (4 mi) long north-south ridge that starts at Stonethwaite in Borrowdale and concludes at the strategically important mountain pass of Esk Hause. The fell is craggy and rocky and falls away steeply to the head of the Langstrath valley on its eastern side while its western flanks are characterised by grey slabs of rock and are less precipitous as they fall away to Grains Gill. To the north Allen Crags is connected to the fell of Glaramara by a three kilometre undulating ridge which is a joy to walk taking in three subsidiary tops along the way to the main top. To the south the fell drops 80 metres (262 ft) to connect with the mountain pass of Esk Hause from where it is possible to reach the neighbouring fells of Esk Pike and Great End and even Scafell Pike with a little more effort.

== Geology ==
The summit rocks comprise the laminated volcaniclastic claystones and siltstones of the Esk Pike Formation. There is a narrow intrusion of andesite and hybridized andesite porphyry running across the high point. The majority of the ridge displays the underlying dacitic welded lapilli tuff of the Lincomb Tarns Formation.

== Ascents ==
As mentioned Allen Crags is quite often approached along its northern ridge from Glaramara and this is the most popular ascent of the fell. However, a direct climb is possible from Borrowdale ascending the Grains Gill path from Seathwaite to Esk Hause and then climbing easily up the fell from the south. The fell can also be included in a 15 km (9 mi) horseshoe walk from Seathwaite also taking in Seathwaite Fell as well as Glaramara and Allen Crags.

== Summit ==
The top of the fell has three cairns with the middle one set on rocks being the highest. The highlight of the view is an excellent vista of Great Gable, the southern part of the view is restricted by higher fells but the northern panorama from west to east is a fine view.
