= St Peter's Church, Martindale =

Church in Martindale, Cumbria, England

Coordinates: 54.5644°N 2.8736°W

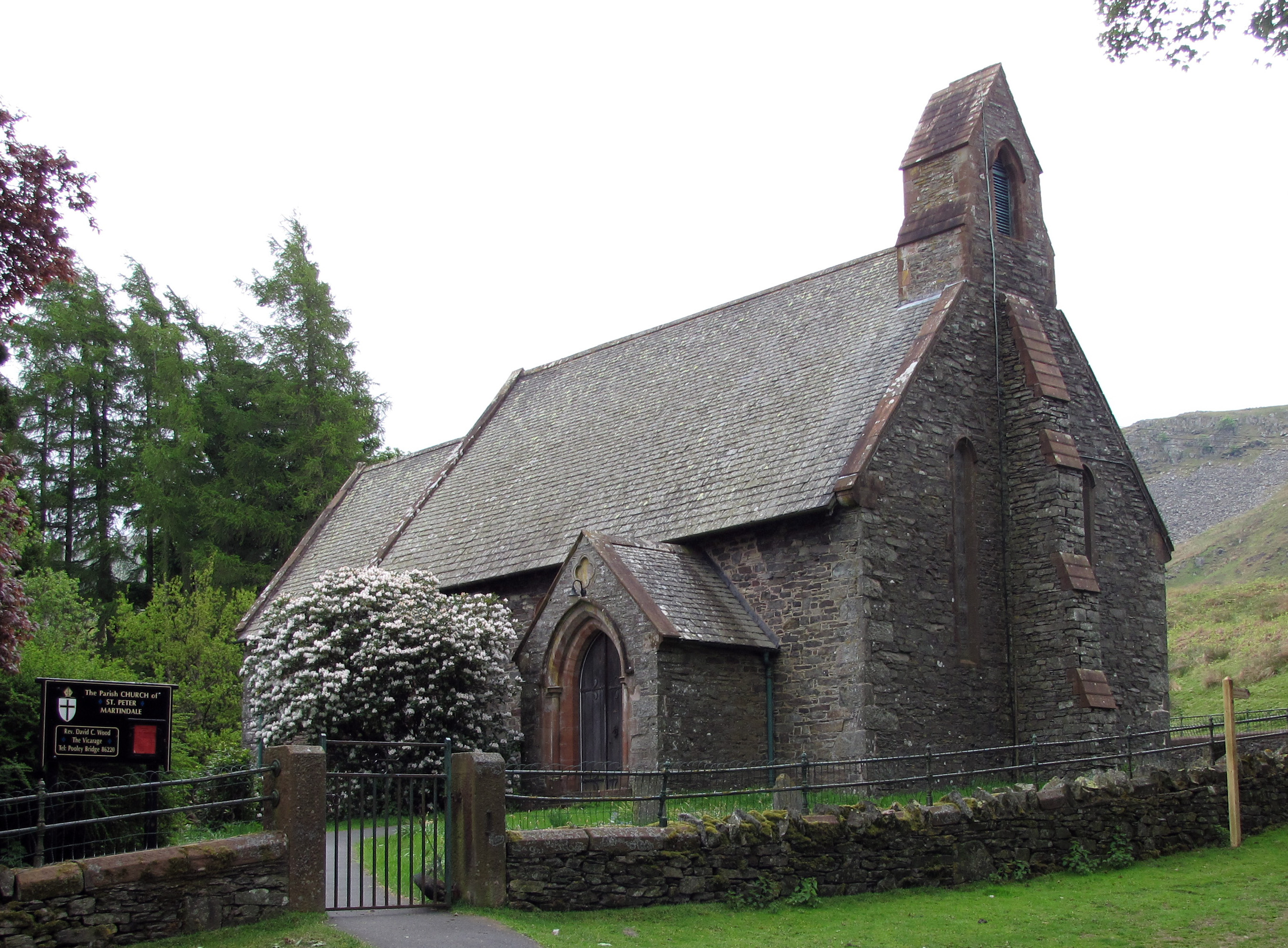

St Peter’s Church is situated in the valley of Martindale in Cumbria, England. The church is located at the top of the hause on the minor road between Martindale and Howtown. It is within the parish of Martindale and is often referred to as the “New Church” to avoid confusion with St Martin’s Church, the “Old Church” and former place of worship of Martindale, which lies half a mile further up the valley. The church is a Grade II listed building.

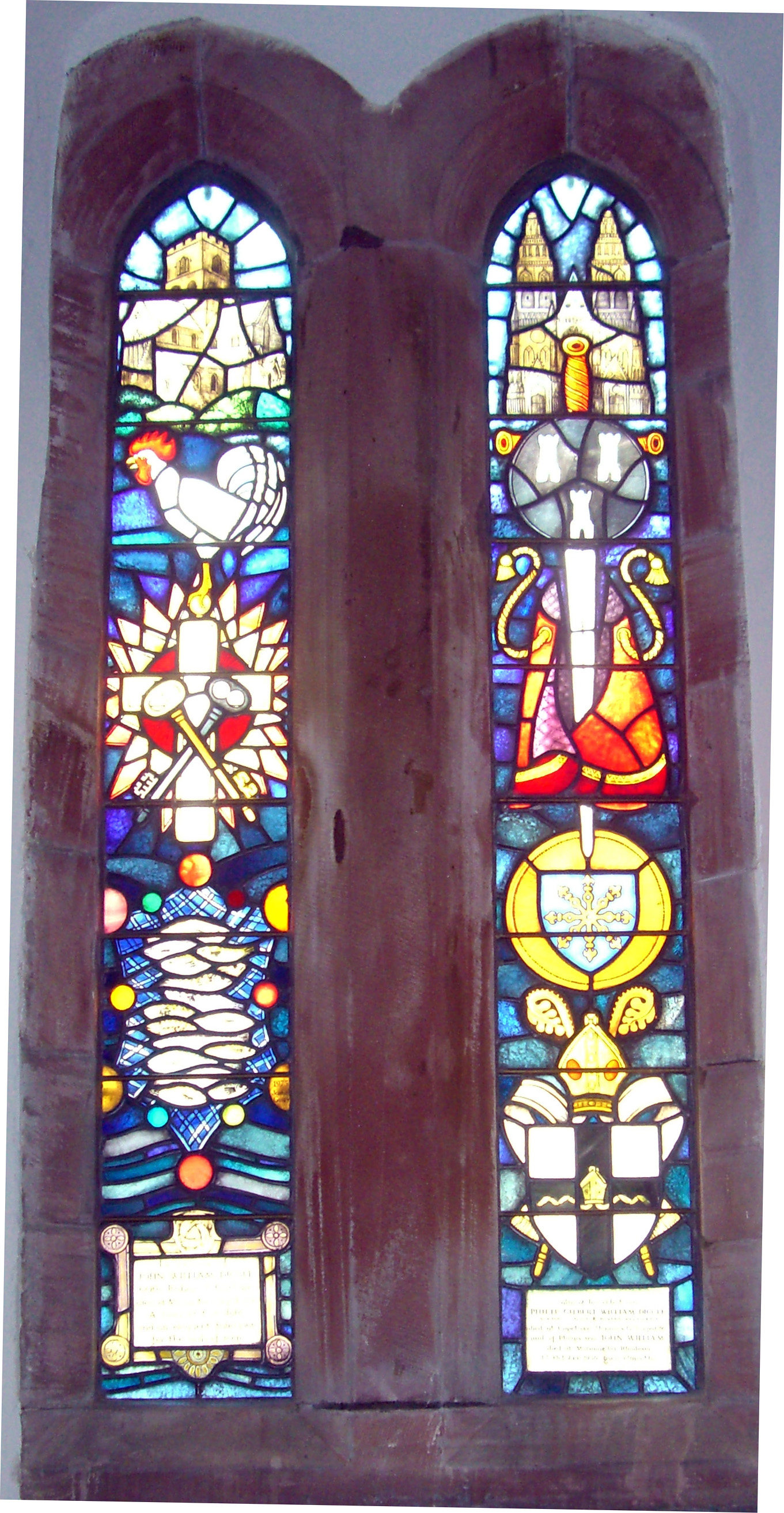
Modern stained glass

== History ==
Construction of St Peter’s began in 1880 on an acre of common land at the top of the hause. The main financial backing for the building came from Anthony Parkin of Sharrow Bay and W.H. Parkin of Ravencragg who were both local residents. The architect was J.B. Cory and the builder was Edward Peel of Patterdale who utilised the stone from the surrounding fells to construct the church in the Early English Style. The church, which was consecrated on 6 January 1882, consists of nave, chancel with vestry, bell tower and an entrance porch facing south-west.

Apart from the east windows, the majority of the stained glass in the church dates from 1975 and was made by the artist Jane Gray of Shrewsbury who designed 15 windows in conjunction with the then Vicar, the Reverend Charles Barrand. The windows are in a modern style and include the St Cecilia window in the Sanctuary which is a memorial to Reverend Barrand and the Passion window which depicts the chalice used in the church. However, the most noteworthy window is situated to the right of the nave and is dedicated to Saint Nicholas, patron saint of sailors, and is in memory of Lieutenant Commander W.H. Parkin and the officers and men of HMS Glorious which was sunk by German battleships in the Norwegian Sea in June 1940. The window shows an airman’s view of the aircraft carrier at full steam.

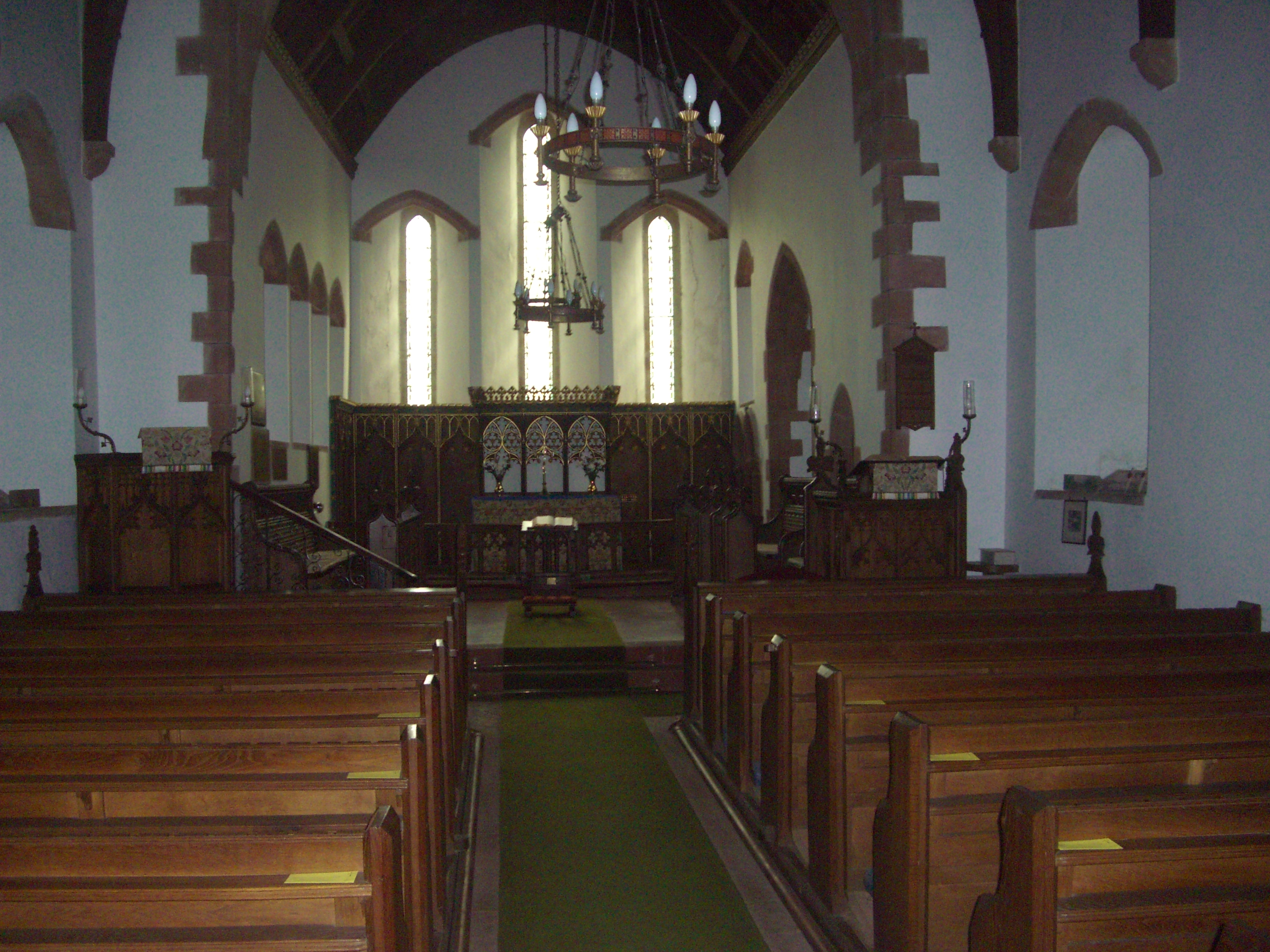
The nave looking toward the chancel

== Present day ==
Today the church receives many visitors as there is a parking area adjacent which is well used by tourists and hill walkers many of whom climb the nearby Hallin Fell to admire the view of Ullswater as well as visiting the church. The lower part of the churchyard originally was a pond but this has dried up in recent years as its feeder streams have been diverted by the local council. The present Vicar is the Reverend David C. Wood who lives at the vicarage in Pooley Bridge.

== See also ==
- Listed buildings in Martindale, Cumbria
