= Howtown Hotel =

Hotel in Cumbria, England

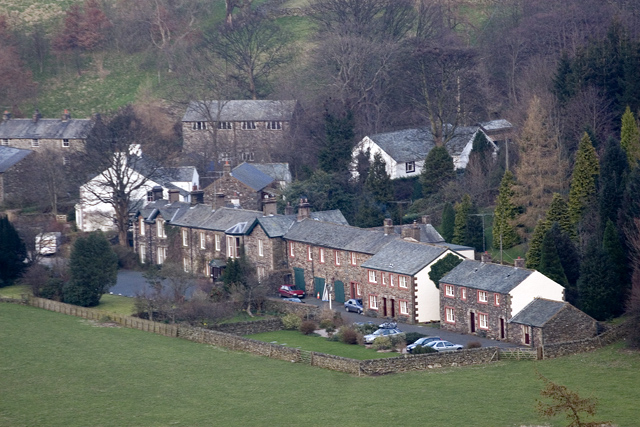

- Location within Cumbria

General information
- Location: Howtown, Cumbria, England
- Coordinates: 54°34′6″N 2°51′47″W
- Opening: 1903

Other information
- Number of rooms: 12

Howtown Hotel is a hotel in Howtown, Cumbria, England, located near the southern shore of the Ullswater lake. Although it won the César Award for Best Hotel in 1991 by The Good Hotel Guide, Lonely Planet describes the hotel as "bewitchingly backwards" with early 20th century decor. As of 2001, the hotel contained 10 double rooms, 2 single rooms and 4 self-catering cottages. It has been run by four generations of the Baldry family since it opened in 1903.
