= Place Fell =

Fell in the Lake District, Cumbria, England

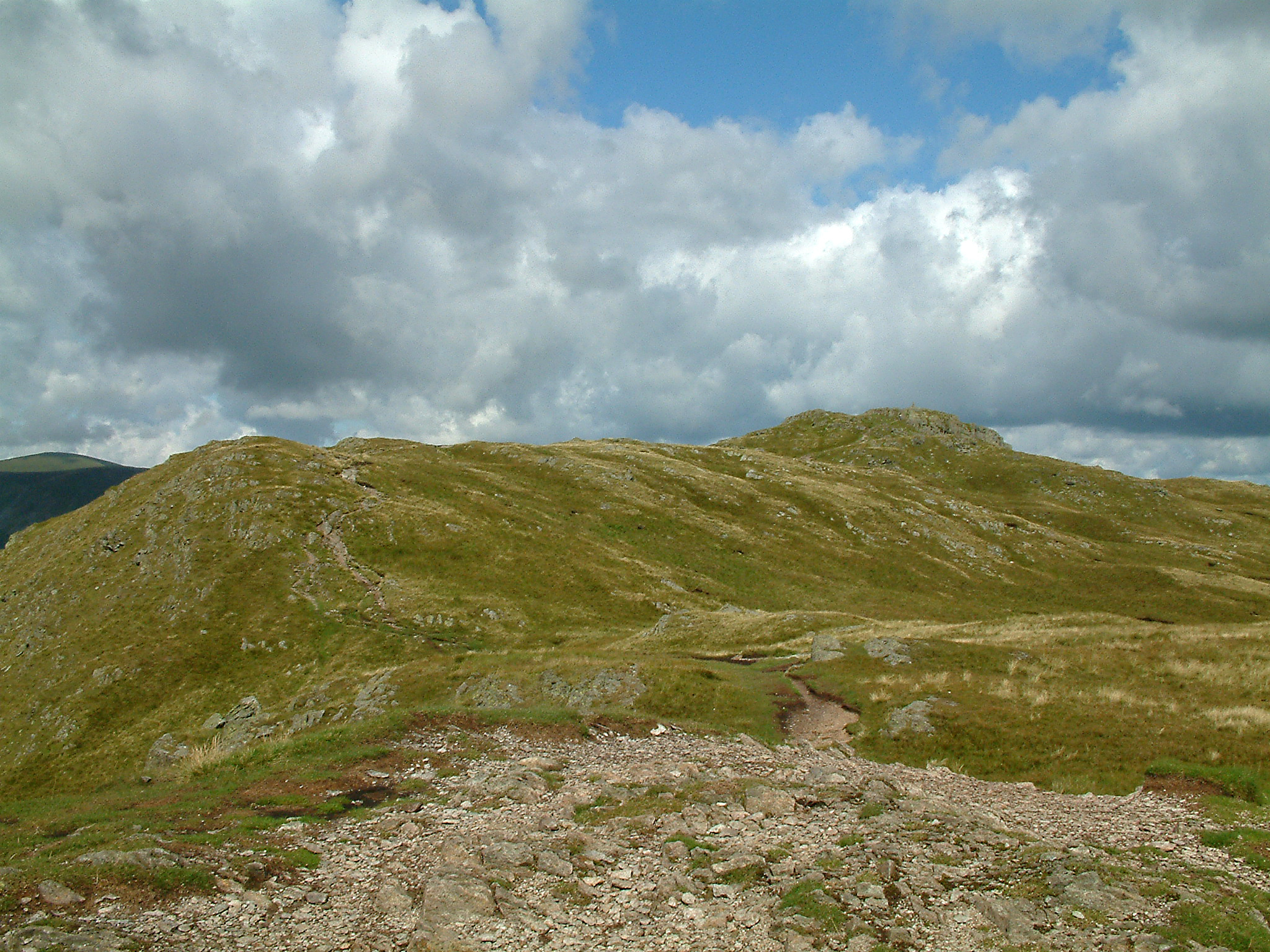
- Summit ridge of Place Fell

Highest point
- Elevation: 657 m (2,156 ft)
- Prominence: 262 m (860 ft)
- Parent peak: High Street
- Listing: Marilyn, Hewitt, Wainwright, Nuttall
- Coordinates: 54°32′38″N 2°55′16″W

Geography
- Location within the Lake District
- Location: Cumbria, England
- Parent range: Lake District, Far Eastern Fells
- OS grid: NY405169
- Topo map: OS Explorer OL5

Place Fell is a mountain in the English Lake District. It stands at the corner of the upper and middle reaches of Ullswater, with steep western flanks overlooking the villages of Glenridding and Patterdale.

== Topography ==
A ten-mile (16 km) horseshoe of high ground surrounds the Martindale catchment, a system of valleys draining northward into Ullswater. Place Fell is at the western terminus of this ridge. To the south is Angletarn Pikes, whilst on all other sides Place Fell stands independent and is bordered by deep valleys.

The fell is bounded on the north and west by Ullswater. For the most part these flanks fall steeply to the shore, with several areas of woodland on the lower slopes. The exception is Silver Point, the promontory separating the upper and middle reaches of the lake. This is formed by Silver Crag, 890 feet (270 m), an outlier standing apart from the mass of the fell. The lakeshore path from Sandwick in the north to Patterdale in the south was described by A. Wainwright as "the most beautiful and rewarding walk in Lakeland". South of the lake, Place Fell's steep slopes continue above Patterdale village to Boredale Hause above the valley of Goldrill Beck.

Place Fell's eastern boundary is Boredale, one of the Martindale valleys. This face is also steep with many outcrops of crag. Travelling up Boredale, the valley turns gradually to the south-west, making as though to intercept Patterdale and cut the fell off from its neighbours altogether. The thin strip of high ground at Boredale Hause, 1,300 feet (400 m), is all that joins Place Fell to the main body of the Far Eastern Fells. A tiny ruin at the top of the pass is named on OS maps as the 'Chapel in the Hause', one of the more unlikely sites for a church. From the hause the ridge can be followed south along a good path to Angletarn Pikes, first climbing the subsidiary top of Stony Rigg, 1,610 ft (490 m). Other paths from this walkers crossroads lead to Patterdale, Boredale, Bannerdale via Beda Fell, and Hartsop, in addition to the route up Steel Edge to the summit of Place Fell.

The top of Place Fell is a wide plateau, with the summit located at the south-western corner. From here the rocky ridge of Hart Crag runs for a short distance north-east across the plateau, decorated with a number of small tarns. Continuing in this direction, the ground gradually narrows as it descends to Low Moss, beyond which are the subsidiary tops of High Dodd (1,645 ft / 501 m) and Sleet Fell (1,240 ft / 380 m).

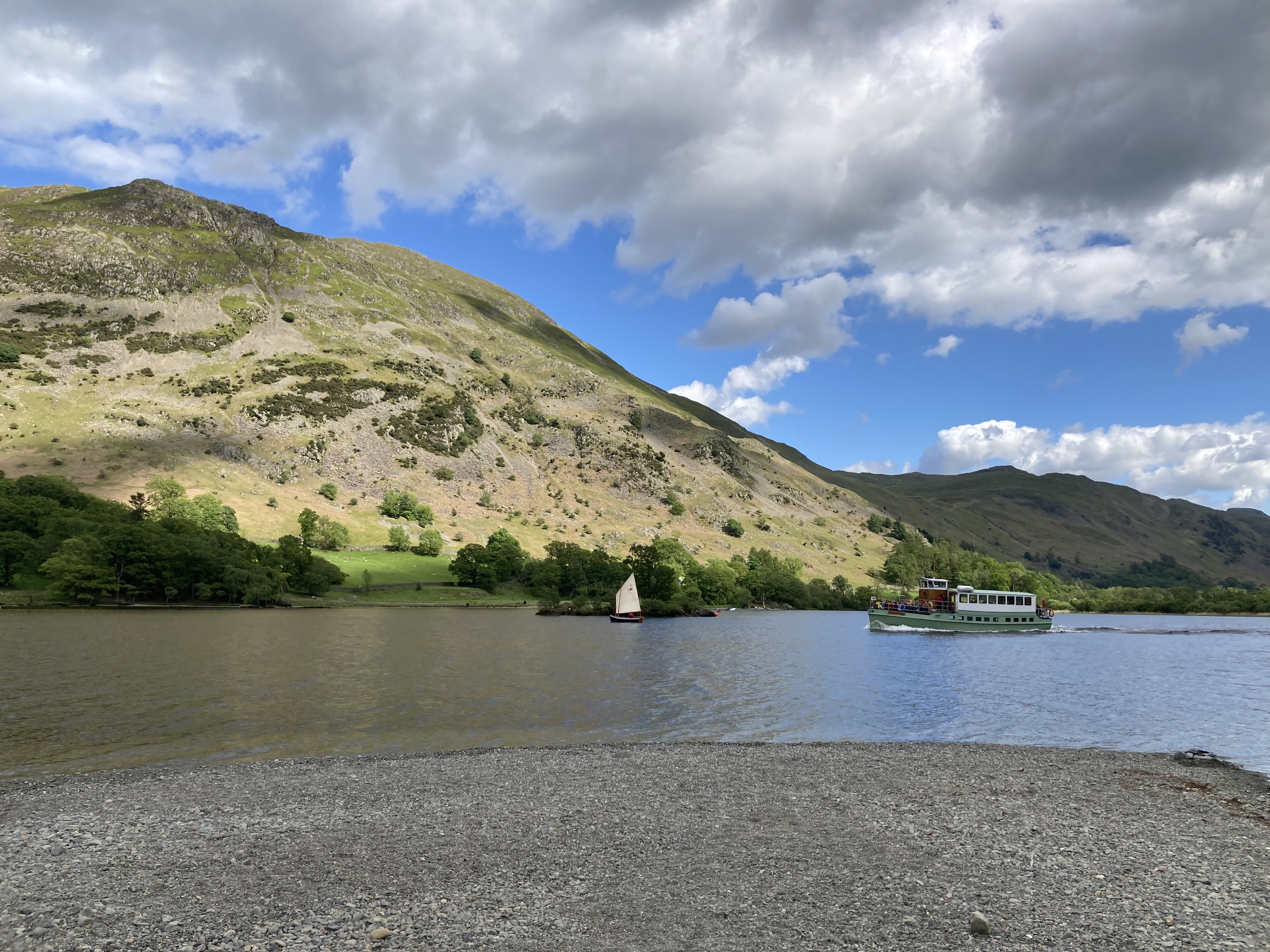
Place Fell as seen from the opposite side of Ullswater

A second descending ridge runs north from the summit area, beginning at The Knight (1,800 ft / 550 m). This rock outcrop assumes an impressive peaked appearance when viewed from the north, although from behind it could easily be missed. From here the ridge descends over Bleaberry Knott (1,675 ft / 511 m) and Low Birk Fell (within Birk Fell Site of Special Scientific Interest), curving east above the middle reach of Ullswater. Low Birk Fell sports a fine beacon (columnar cairn), easily seen from Sandwick. Between the Bleaberry Fell and High Dodd ridges is the valley of Scalehow Beck, providing much of Place Fell's northern drainage.

== Summit ==
The summit of the fell has an OS triangulation column and cairn placed about ten yards apart on two competing high-points. The cairn sits above Ullswater and provides superb views up the facing valleys from Glencoyne round to Kirkstone, the rough eastern faces of the Helvellyn range being particularly striking.

== Ascents ==
Place Fell can be climbed from Patterdale, either via Boredale Hause or more directly by aiming up the face between Bleaberry Knott and The Knight. Ascents can also be made from Sandwick up either of the north-eastern ridges, or from Boredale via the Hause. The altitude gain from the shores of Ullswater to the peak of Place Fell is 512 m (1,680 ft), but trails have shallow gradients and no hands-on scrambling is required; scrambling opportunities are few, even off-trail.
