= St Martin's Church, Martindale =

St Martin's Church
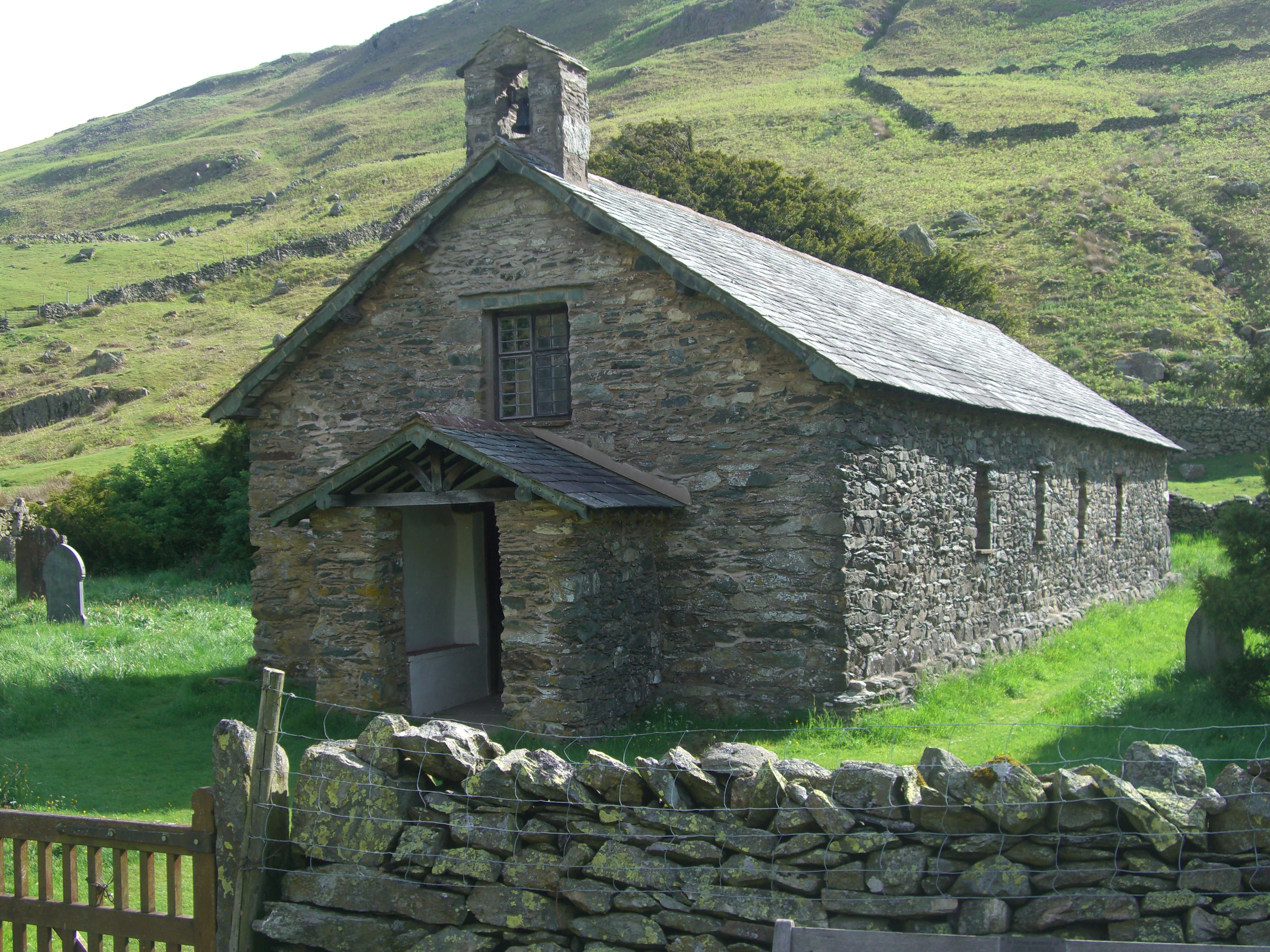
- The church.
- St Martin's Church
- 54.5577°N 2.8762°W
- OS grid reference: NY 434 184
- Location: Martindale, Cumbria
- Country: England
- Denomination: Church of England

History
- Founded: 1220

Architecture
- Functional status: Active

Clergy
- Vicar: Reverend David C. Wood

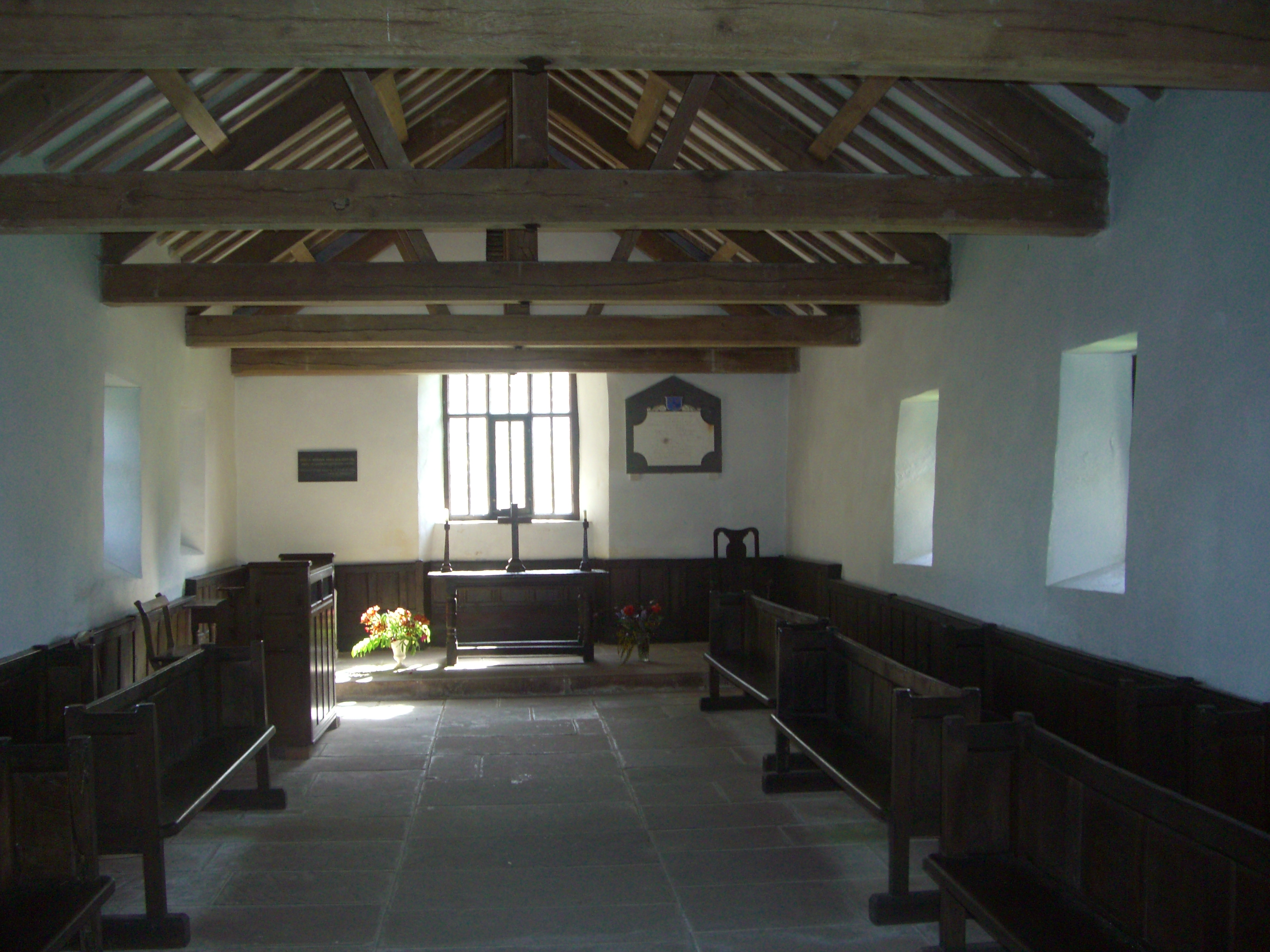
The interior.

St Martin's Church, Martindale is located in the valley of Martindale in Cumbria, England. It is often referred to as the "Old Church" to avoid confusion with the nearby St Peter's Church which is situated half a mile down the valley. The church is dedicated to Saint Martin of Tours. It is now only in occasional use. The church is a Grade II* listed building.

== History ==
The date of the establishment of a place of worship on the site of St Martin's is unknown but it is mentioned in a de Lancaster Charter of 1220 and other references state that a chapel was already in existence at that date. In its early days and up until the dissolution of the monasteries in 1536 St Martin's was served by the monks of the parish of Barton. On Christopher Saxton's map of 1576 the church is shown as "Markendale Chap". In 1633 the parish of Martindale was founded and Richard Birkett became the church's first resident priest, he served until his death on Christmas Day 1699, after a ministry of almost 67 years.

The present building was probably erected at the end of the 16th century, replacing the chapel, the last reference to which occurs in a document of 13 April 1541. In 1714 the church floor was flagged as the congregation were no longer prepared to endure the damp earth floor. In 1839, William Ford, in his book "Description of Scenery in the Lake District" described the building as "a chapel with low roof and simple bell-gable, and a picturesque yew-tree". The church underwent a series of restorations, the last of which was in 1882 when the roof was replaced, the old box pews were removed and the same wood was used to construct the side benches. The singers and musicians gallery was taken down and new window frames installed.

== Items of interest ==
The tiny church bell which hangs in an open cote at the west end of the church is over 500 years old. The pulpit bears the date 1634 and the initials of the donor John Dawes. The font is believed to be part of a Roman altar which stood as a wayside shrine on the Roman road which crossed the nearby fell of High Street. It was brought down from the fell and used as a holy water container and later as the font.

The churchyard contains an ancient Yew tree which is estimated to be 1300 years old, documents in the church state the men of Martindale, who were famous as bowmen, used the tree and others in the district to replenish their arms. Also in the churchyard is the Birkett tomb where the first priest of St Martin's, Richard Birkett, is interred. His epitaph states that he was 95 years old when he died and left a sum of £100 "towards the better maintenance of a godly, sober and religious Minister at Martindale Chapell".

== Present day ==
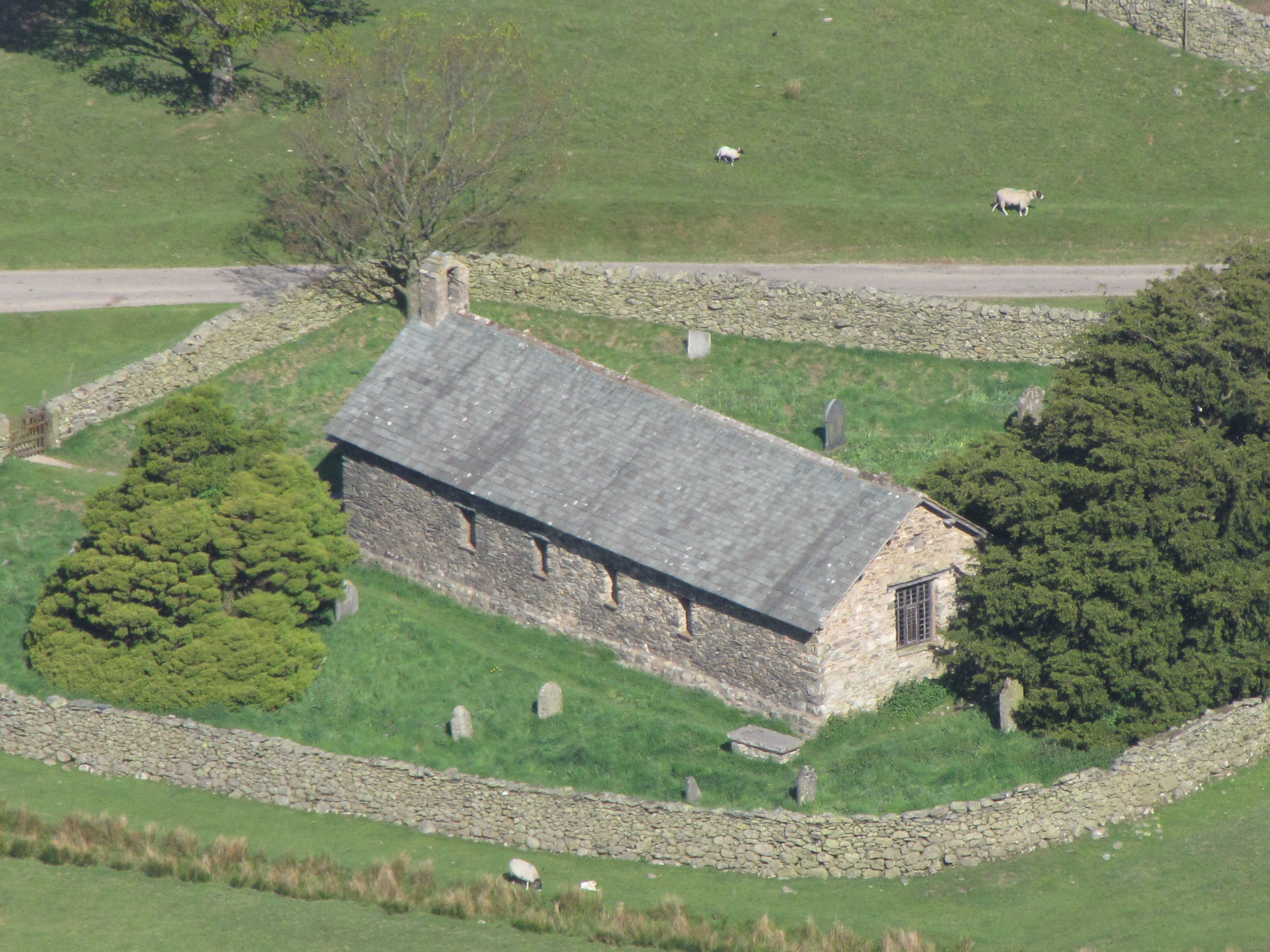
Seen from the fell of Steel Knotts. The ancient yew tree is to the right of the church.

Today the church is only open for Evensong on the last Sunday of the month from May to August at 5:30pm. The building is never locked and is frequently visited by passing hill walkers and tourists. The present Vicar is the Reverend David C. Wood who lives at the vicarage in Pooley Bridge.

== See also ==
- Grade II* listed buildings in Westmorland and Furness
- Listed buildings in Martindale, Cumbria
