= Ting Mound =

Ancient monument in the Lake District, Cumbria, England

Coordinates: 54.4193°N 3.0823°W

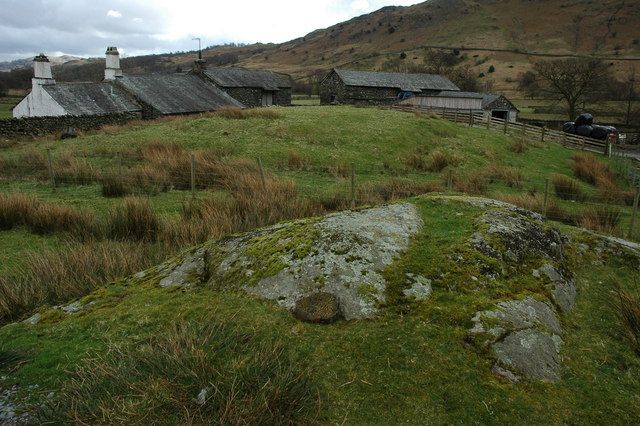
Ting Mound

The Ting Mound or Thing Moot at Fellfoot Farm, Little Langdale, Cumbria, England is an Ancient Monument (a 'nationally important' archaeological site). It is a natural mound which has been deliberately terraced, possibly in the tenth century, although it has not been dated archaeologically.

It is believed that the mound was used as an open-air meeting place for local government, specifically for a Thing (from the Old Norse þing), a type of early assembly found throughout Northern Europe where there was Scandinavian influence. The mound is very similar to the Tynwald Mount on the Isle of Man. This supports the idea that it was established by Viking settlers, who have left a legacy of Norse toponyms in the Langdales, and possibly built some of the dry-stone walls which are a feature of the landscape. It is situated close to a Roman road and other transport routes through the Cumbrian mountains.

Towards the end of the nineteenth century the site attracted the interest of local antiquarians. It was described by Henry Swainson Cowper (see note^{1}) and painted by W.G. Collingwood.

== Notes ==
1. It consists of an oblong quadrangular platform (the E. side of which is 75 ft., the W. 70 ft., the N. 21 ft., and the S. 19 ft.), surrounded and approached by stepped platforms all of which are of the uniform breadth of 14 ft. On the N. side there are two of these, on the W. three, and on the S. four. The east side has apparently had the same number as the west, but they are partly destroyed or obliterated by a row of ancient yew trees, and by the farm buildings.

The bank of the summit is in places indistinct, as on the east side, especially at the north end. The surrounding terraces are best marked at the south-west corner, where the natural level of the ground is lowest, and here the lowest bank seems about 4 feet high, the next about 2 ft., and the total height at this corner from 10 to 12 ft. The banks seem chiefly formed of earth, but at the south-east corner, where they are partially destroyed, they are stony. The ground upon which the mound is placed rises to the north, and falls to the south; but the terraces and banks of the mound itself rise gently to the south.
