= Cockley Beck =

Hamlet in Cumbria, England

Coordinates: 54.404°N 3.161°W

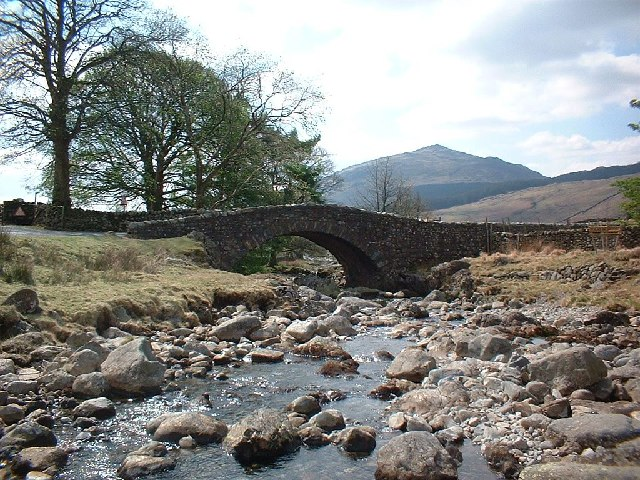
- Cockley Beck Bridge, looking southwest over the bridge

- Location in South Lakeland Location within Cumbria
- OS grid reference: NY246015
- Civil parish: Dunnerdale-with-Seathwaite
- Unitary authority: Westmorland and Furness
- Ceremonial county: Cumbria
- Region: North West
- Country: England
- Sovereign state: United Kingdom
- Post town: BROUGHTON-IN-FURNESS
- Postcode district: LA20
- Dialling code: 01229
- Police: Cumbria
- Fire: Cumbria
- Ambulance: North West
- UK Parliament: Barrow and Furness

Cockley Beck is a small hamlet, situated in the Duddon Valley in Cumbria, England. Historically, the hamlet was part of Lancashire.

Located today within the Lake District National Park, it was established in the late 16th century, and is closely associated with the mining of copper ore in Cumbria.
