= Martindale, Cumbria =

Village and civil parish in Cumbria, England

Coordinates: 54°33′25″N 2°52′39″W

Martindale
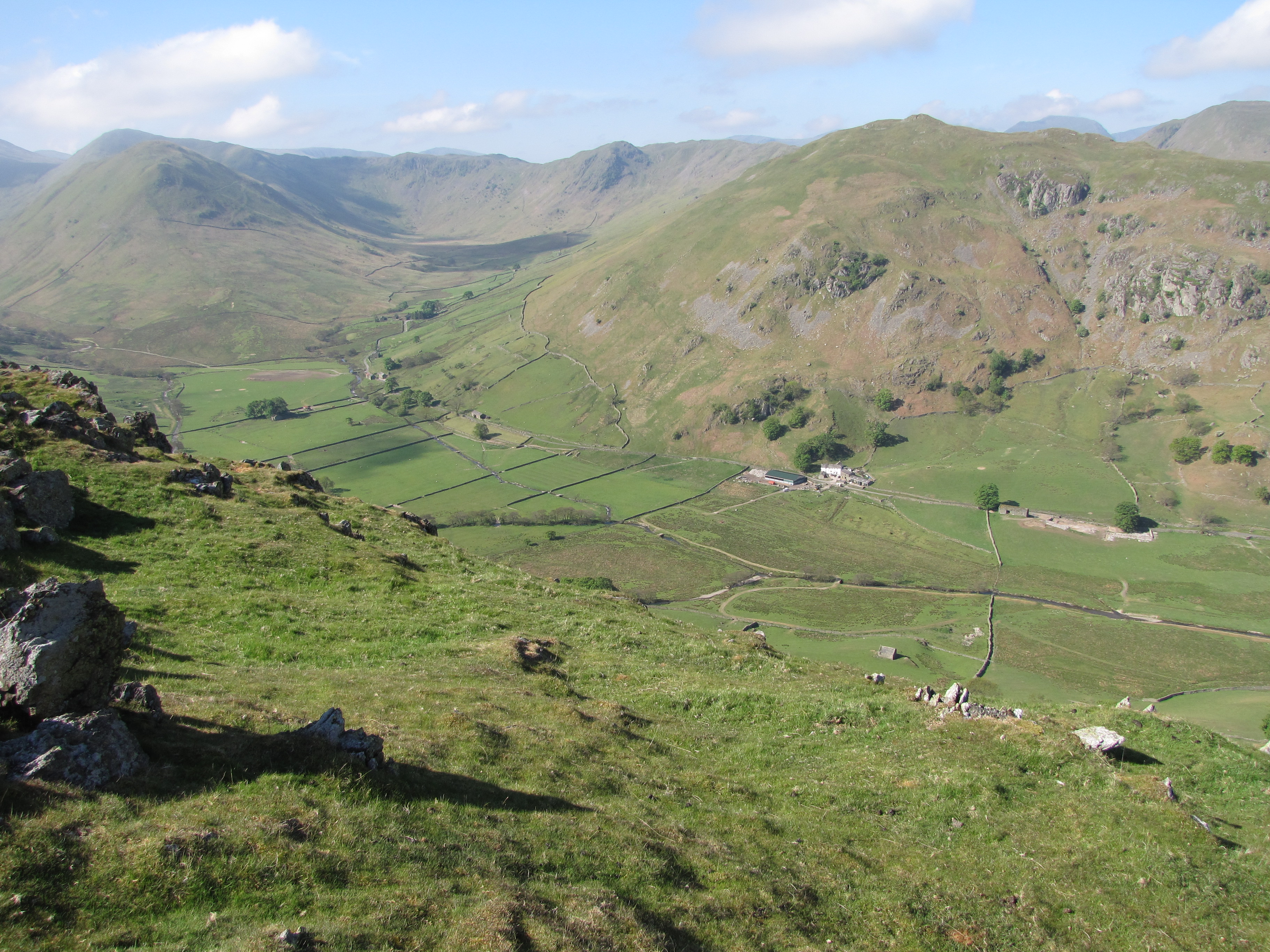
- The mid and upper parts of Martindale from Steel Knotts

- Location within Cumbria
- Population: 49 (2001)
- OS grid reference: NY4319
- Civil parish: Martindale
- Unitary authority: Westmorland and Furness
- Ceremonial county: Cumbria
- Region: North West
- Country: England
- Sovereign state: United Kingdom
- Post town: PENRITH
- Postcode district: CA10
- Dialling code: 01768
- Police: Cumbria
- Fire: Cumbria
- Ambulance: North West
- UK Parliament: Westmorland and Lonsdale

Martindale is a valley, village and civil parish in Westmorland and Furness, England, situated within the Lake District National Park between the lakes of Ullswater and Haweswater. The valley is served by a narrow minor road which runs as far as the farm of Dale Head. This road commences at Howtown, a hamlet on the shore of Ullswater that forms part of the civil parish but is not in the valley of Martindale, and passes over a mountain pass or hause into the valley.

At the time of the 2011 census, the population of the civil parish was less than 100. Details are included in the parish of Bampton.

== Description ==
Martindale runs for approximately nine km in a north to south direction, it is a remote and thinly populated valley which has a permanent population of only about 50 residents. The foot of the valley is located at the small hamlet of Sandwick on the western shore of Ullswater, while its head is situated on the slopes of Rampsgill Head where the headwaters of Howegrain Beck rise at a height of around 700 metres (2,300 ft) above sea level. The upper part of the valley is divided into two branches by the fell of The Nab, these two sub valleys named Bannerdale and Rampsgill contain the streams of Bannerdale Beck and Rampsgill Beck which meet at a point midway down Martindale to form Howegrain Beck which then becomes the main watercourse for the lower part of Martindale and enters Ullswater at Sandwick. Just before reaching Sandwick, Martindale is joined by the side valley of Boredale, which enters from the south.

== Deer reserve ==
The upper part of Martindale around The Nab is a deer reserve which is not open to the public and contains no rights of way. The reserve is home to the oldest native red deer herd in England. Hill walkers are requested by the Dalemain Estate, which owns the reserve, to keep to preferred routes which avoid the herds when climbing The Nab, to which there is now open access under the Countryside and Rights of Way Act 2000. Access to the summit of the Nab is across a difficult peat bog and there is no descent from the Nab, instead walkers must return to the High Street.

At the foot of The Nab is “The Bungalow”, this is a former shooting lodge which was constructed in 1910 by Hugh Lowther, 5th Earl of Lonsdale for a deer shooting visit by the German Emperor Wilhelm II in 1910. Today, the Bungalow is used as self-catering accommodation, which houses 10 people.

== Habitations ==
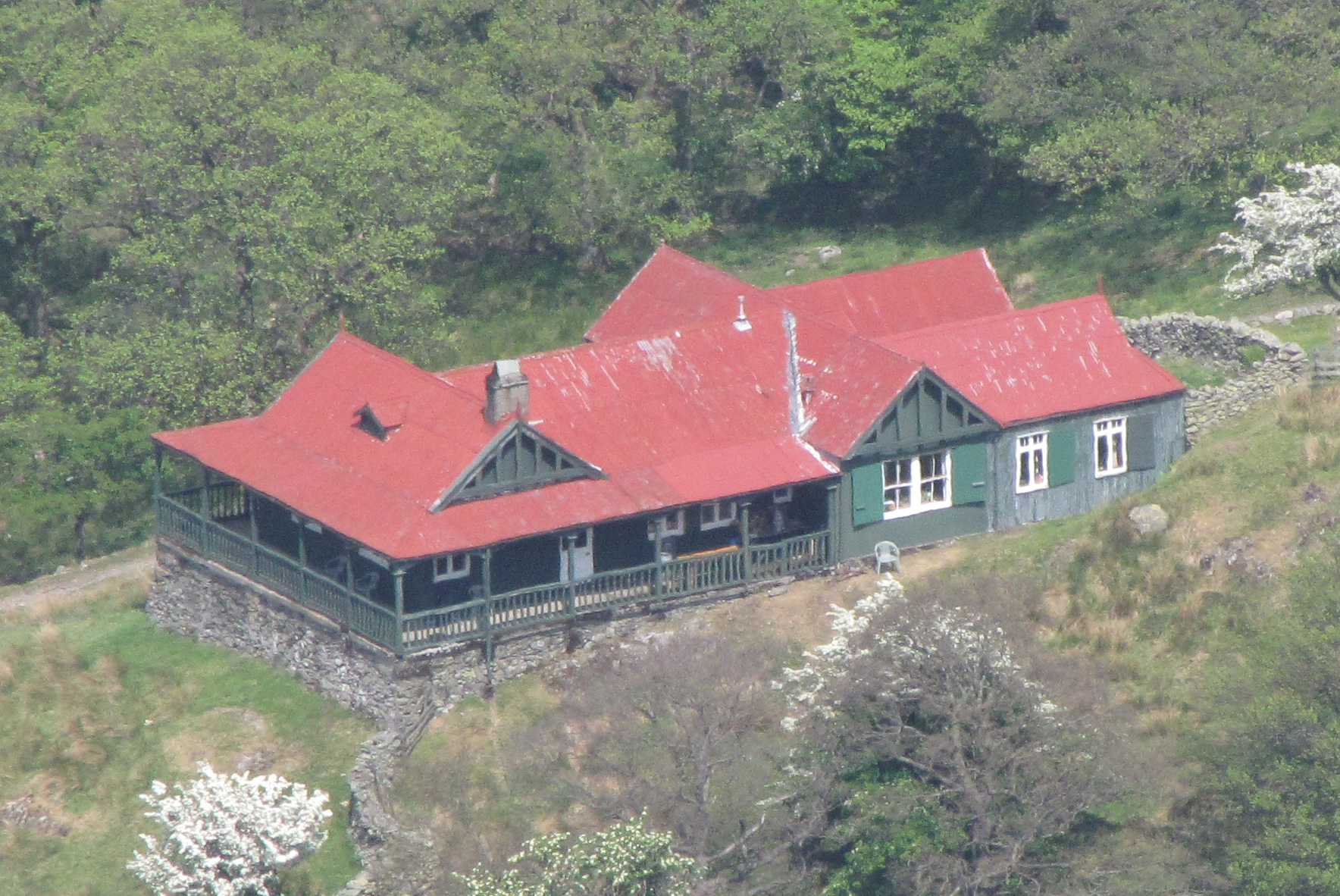
The Bungalow in the deer reserve.

The main area of habitation in the valley itself is situated in its lower area where the road comes over the hause from Howtown. Here, there is Hause Farm, The Old Reading Room and a few self-catering holiday homes. At the top of the hause is St Peter's Church often referred to as the New Church, which dates from 1880. Half a kilometre further up the valley is the restored St Martin's Church, the present building dates from the end of the 16th century. Other farm buildings in the mid and upper parts of Martindale are Winter Crag, Knicklethorns, Henhow, Thrang Crag and Dale Head.

Martindale is surrounded by the Far Eastern Fells and is a popular starting point for hillwalking. One of the most popular walks is the Martindale Skyline, a 10 miles (16 km) walk with just over 1,000 metres (3,300 ft) of ascent which takes in many of the peaks around the valley including Beda Fell and Steel Knotts.

== See also ==
- Listed buildings in Martindale, Cumbria
