= Howtown =

Hamlet in Cumbria, England

Coordinates: 54.569732°N 2.862544°W

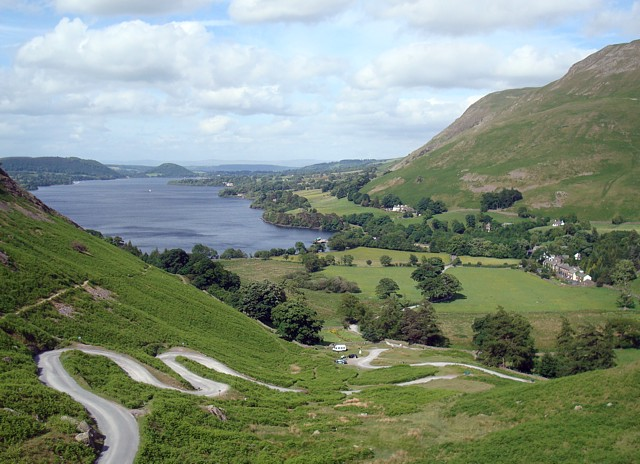
- The hamlet situated on Howtown Wyke bay on Ullswater

- Location in Eden, Cumbria Location within Cumbria
- OS grid reference: NY455218
- Civil parish: Martindale
- Unitary authority: Westmorland and Furness
- Ceremonial county: Cumbria
- Region: North West
- Country: England
- Sovereign state: United Kingdom
- Post town: PENRITH
- Postcode district: CA10
- Dialling code: 017684
- Police: Cumbria
- Fire: Cumbria
- Ambulance: North West
- UK Parliament: Westmorland and Lonsdale

Howtown is a hamlet in Cumbria, England, situated at a small harbour on the east shore of Ullswater in the Lake District. It lies within the civil parish of Martindale.

Howtown is about three and a half miles from Pooley Bridge and is best reached by water. The Ullswater 'Steamers' regularly stop there on their way from Glenridding at the southern end of Ullswater to Pooley Bridge at the northern end of the lake.

The name Howtown means "farmstead on the hill". The place name is from the Old Norse word haugr, meaning "hill" or "mound", and the Old English word tūn, meaning "town". It contains the Howtown Hotel, Outward Bound Centre and Waternook Lakeside Accommodation. Howtown was founded by the How (or Howe) family.

== Transport ==
1 route run by Stagecoach serves the village. UB1 to Aira Force Waterfall via Pooley Bridge.

== See also ==
- Listed buildings in Martindale, Cumbria
