= Ullswater 'Steamers' =

Business operating boats on Ullswater in the English Lake District

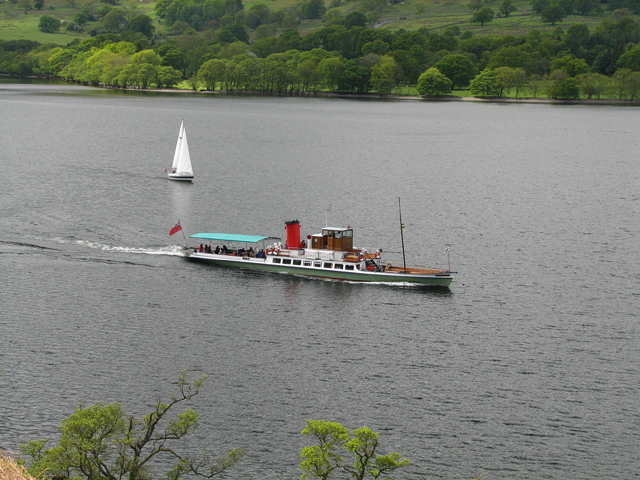
- Type: Private company
- Industry: Passenger transportation Leisure cruises
- Founded: 1855
- Headquarters: Glenridding, Cumbria,
- Area served: Ullswater
- Website: www.ullswater-steamers.co.uk

Ullswater 'Steamers' is a boat company which provides leisure trips on Ullswater in the north-eastern part of the English Lake District. It is based in Glenridding, Cumbria. Founded in 1855, it currently operates five diesel powered vessels between four locations on the lake. The oldest boat in its fleet was launched in 1877.

== History ==
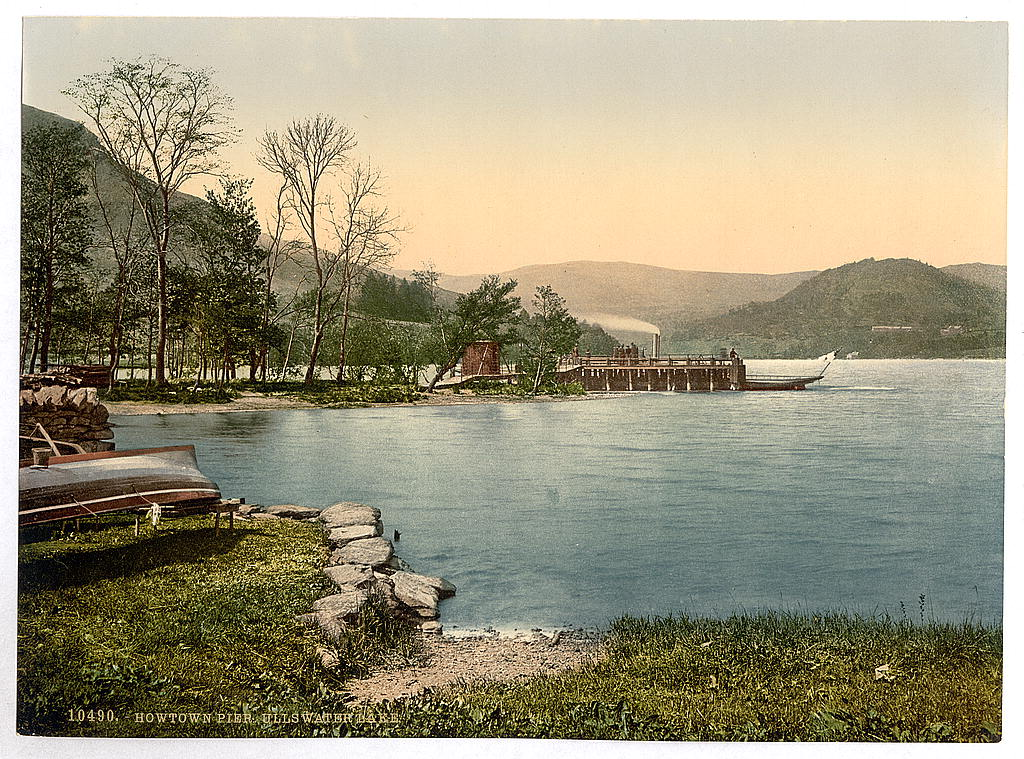
Steamer at Howtown Pier c.1890-1900

The company was founded as the Ullswater Steam Navigation Company in 1855, and originally moved mail, workers and goods between the Greenside Mine at Glenridding and the village of Pooley Bridge at the opposite end of the lake. On 13 August 1859, the company's first purpose-built vessel, the paddle steamer Enterprise, was launched, although it subsequently sank in the lake. In 1877, the company introduced the steam powered pleasure cruiser the Lady of the Lake, and this was joined in 1889 by the Raven. Both are still in service.

In 1900 the company was renamed as the Ullswater Navigation and Transit Company. In the 1930s, the company converted its fleet of two steam powered pleasure cruisers, the Lady of the Lake and the Raven, to operate on diesel engines. In 1954 Sir Wavell Wakefield bought a controlling shareholding in Ullswater 'Steamers' to prevent the company from being wound up. The company is still in the ownership of the family of Lord Wakefield, as Sir Wavell subsequently became.

In 2001, the company started to operate sailings during the winter; it had previously only operated during the summer tourist season. Between the years of 2001 and 2010, three additional vessels were acquired by the company, these being the Lady Dorothy, Lady Wakefield and Western Belle. All three were acquired from previous salt-water service and conveyed to the lake by road. In 2015 a new jetty was opened by the company at Aira Force.

The company was affected by the series of storms (Desmond, Eva and Frank) that hit Cumbria at the end of 2015. The Lady Wakefield, moored at Pooley Bridge Pier, broke free during Desmond and was damaged by the pier, resulting in her being deliberately driven ashore to save her from sinking. The same storm destroyed the bridge at Pooley Bridge, severing connection between the village and pier. Both the pier and the ticket office at Glenridding were flooded. By Easter 2016, services had recommenced and a replacement bridge built; the Lady Wakefield was relaunched in May and docked for repairs.

== Operation ==
Ullswater 'Steamers' currently operates a fleet of five vessels from four jetties on Ullswater at Glenridding, Pooley Bridge, Howtown and Aira Force. Two services are operated, with the main service providing a link the length of the lake between Glenridding, Howtown and Pooley Bridge, whilst a second shorter service connects Glenridding and Aira Force. The service frequency varies depending on the time of year, up to a roughly hourly service on both routes in summer. In addition to its scheduled passenger services, the company's vessels can be hired for private functions and parties on Ullswater.

The steamer company is in common ownership with the Ravenglass and Eskdale Railway, a 7 miles (11.3 km) minimum-gauge heritage railway that operates to the western side of the Lake District. Both companies form part of the Lake District Estates group, which also owns various tourist oriented properties in the area, and is controlled by Lord Wakefield's descendants. The vessels of the fleet are maintained on a slipway located at the Waterside Campsite, one of Lake District Estates properties near Pooley Bridge.

== Fleet ==
| Name | Built | Acquired | Passenger Capacity | Description | Image |
|---|---|---|---|---|---|
| Lady of the Lake | 1877 | 1877 | 110 | The M.Y. Lady of the Lake was launched on 26 June 1877 and is believed to be one of the oldest working passenger ferries in the world. She was designed by Douglas Henson of Penrith and built by T.B. Seath & Co. at Rutherglen near Glasgow before being transported to Waterside, where she was assembled and launched. In 1881 the Lady of the Lake sank at her moorings but was re-floated by a team of divers. She was converted from steam to diesel power in 1936. The vessel sank again in 1958 in a severe storm, but was again re-floated. In 1965 the vessel was badly damaged by fire and was out of service for 14 years, before being restored by Lord Wakefield. She was re-launched on 19 May 1979 by William Whitelaw, and is a member of the National Historic Fleet. | |
| Raven | 1889 | 1889 | 150 | The M.Y. Raven was launched on 11 July 1889, having been commissioned in response to the growing popularity of Ullswater as a tourist destination. She was named after Ravencragg, the lakeside home of company director William Hugh Parkin. In 1912, Raven was made a temporary royal yacht when the German Emperor Wilhelm II visited Ullswater during his stay with the 5th Earl of Lonsdale. Her decks were painted yellow, the Earl's personal colour, for the occasion. In 1934, Raven was converted from steam and fitted with twin diesel engines. She is the largest vessel in the fleet, and is a member of the National Historic Fleet. | |
| Western Belle | 1934 | 2008 | 100 | The M.V. Western Belle is a twinscrew passenger vessel, built by Fellows & Co in Great Yarmouth in 1934, for service on the River Tamar and River Yealm at Plymouth. She transferred to the River Dart in 1980, working the Dartmouth to Kingswear ferry. She moved to Hampton Court on the River Thames in 2005. She was purchased by Ullswater 'Steamers' in 2008, and commenced operations on Ullswater in autumn 2010. | |
| Lady Wakefield | 1949 | 2006 | 90 | The M.V. Lady Wakefield was built by Philip and Son in Dartmouth in 1949 for service on the River Dart, and was originally named the Berry Castle. From 1972 she saw service at Fareham and Rochester before returning to the Dart in 1977, taking the name Totnes Castle. In 1985 she moved again, to work on Plymouth Sound. In 2006 she was bought by Ullswater 'Steamers' and refitted. She was re-launched by Princess Alexandra in April 2007, taking her current name in memory of Lord Wakefield's wife. During Storm Desmond in late 2015, Lady Wakefield, moored at Pooley Bridge Pier, was damaged by the pier, resulting in her being deliberately driven ashore to save her from sinking. She was refloated in May 2016 and docked for repairs. | |
| Lady Dorothy | 1967 | 2001 | 40 | The M.V. Lady Dorothy is the smallest of the company's vessels. Originally a sea going vessel from Guernsey, she joined the fleet in 2001 and is the main vessel in service between Aira Force Pier and Glenridding. | |

== Gallery ==
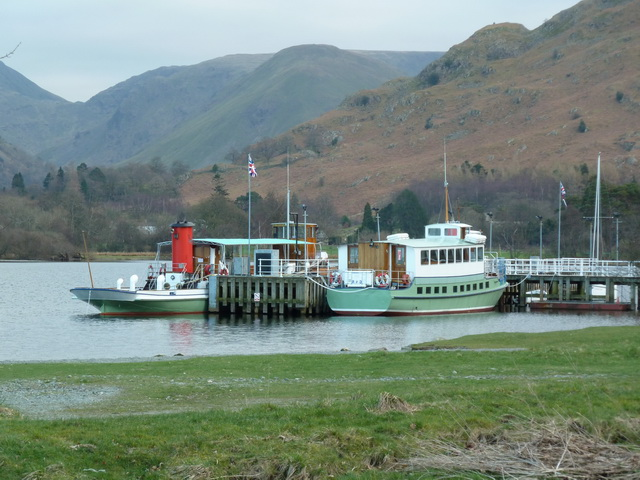
Glenridding Pier, with Lady Wakefield and Raven

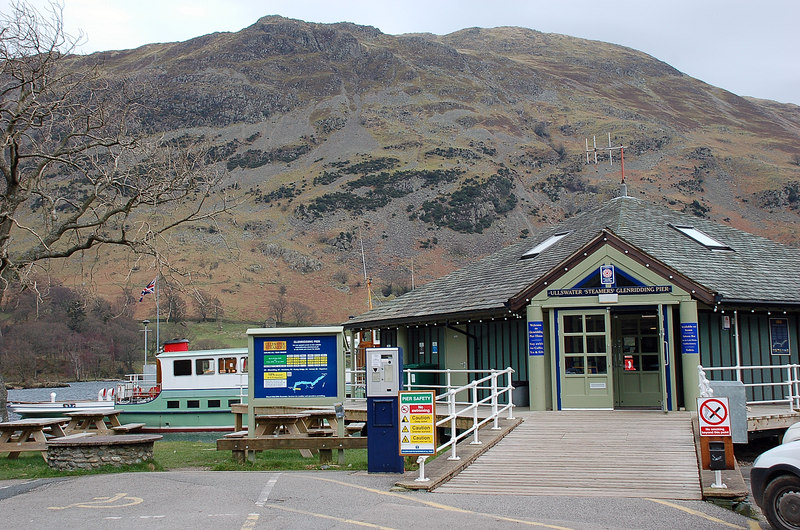
The entrance to Glenridding Pier, with Place Fell behind

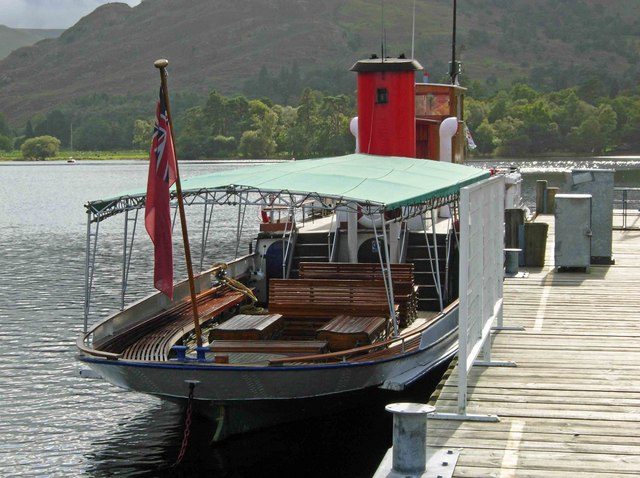
Lady of the Lake at Glenridding.

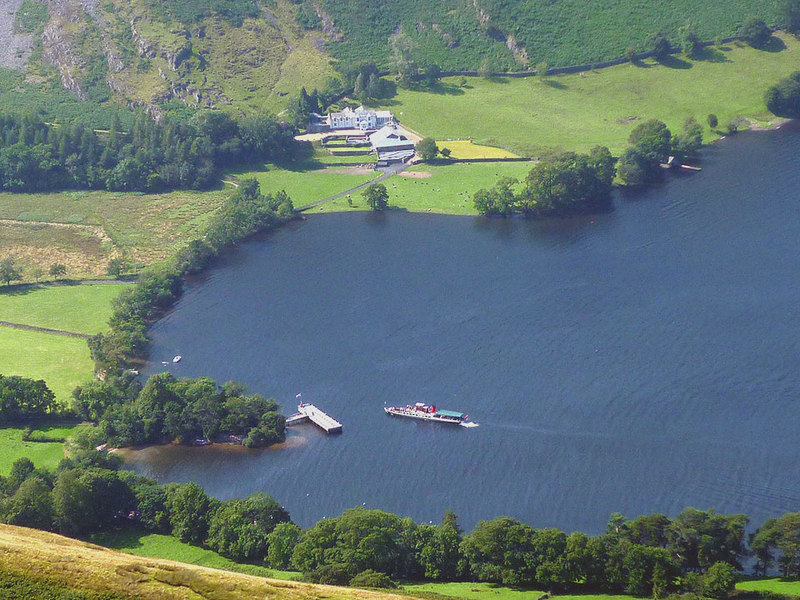
Howtown Pier and steamer seen from Bonscale Pike

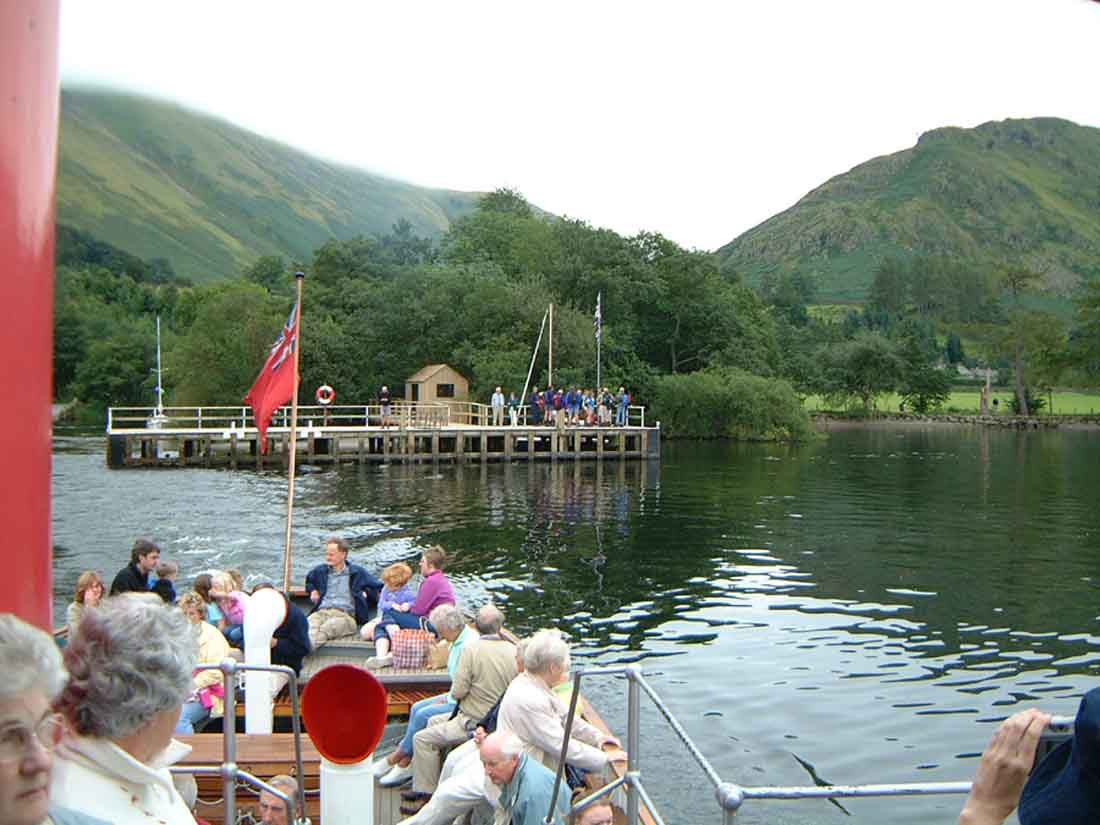
Raven leaving the jetty at Howtown.

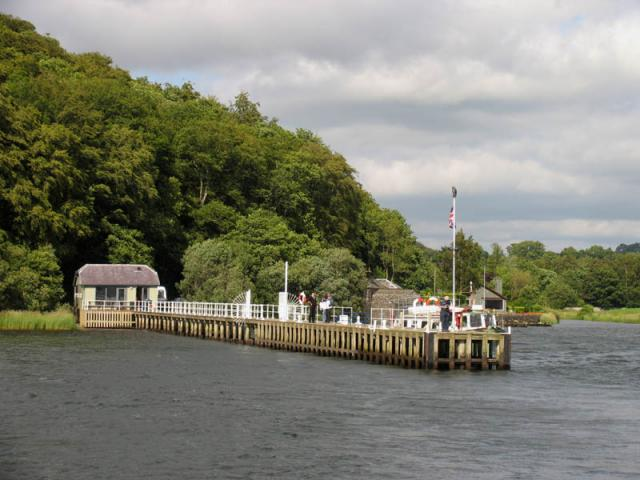
Pooley Bridge Pier, with River Eamont outfall to right

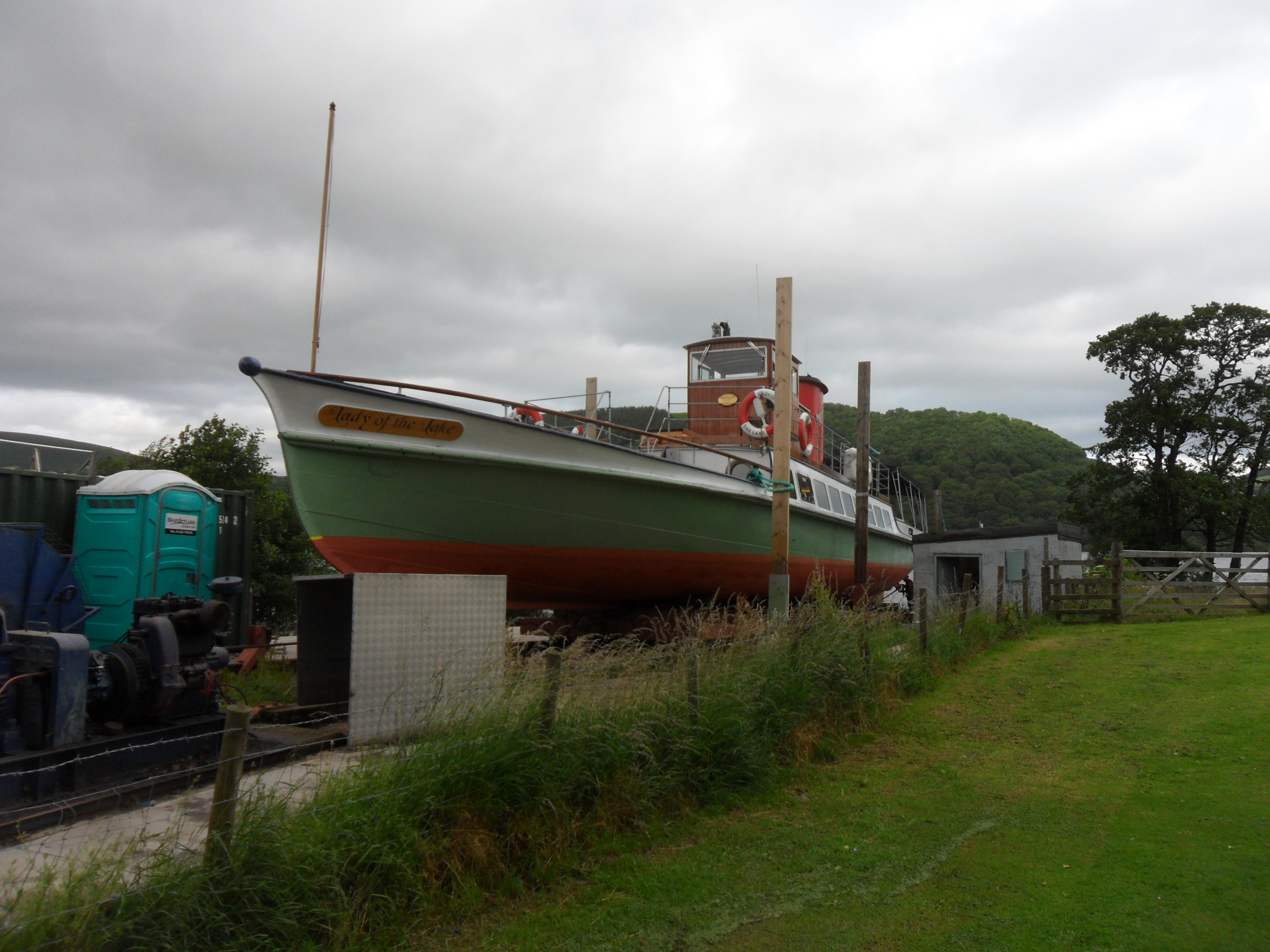
Lady of the Lake on the slip at Waterside

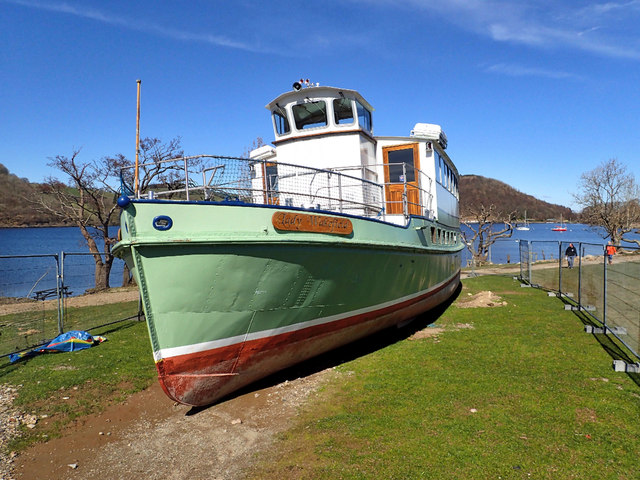
Lady Wakefield beached by Storm Desmond
