= Western Belle =

Western Belle may refer to:

- MV Western Belle, a British commercial passenger ship built in 1935, since 2010 in service on Ullswater
- USS Western Belle (ID-3551), a United States Navy cargo ship in commission from 1918 to 1919
