= SS Raven =

SS Raven, or SY Raven, may refer to:

- SS Raven (1871), a steam barge built in 1871 for service on Windermere in the English Lake District and now preserved at the Windermere Steamboat Museum, also referred to as the SY Raven
- SY Raven (1889), a steam yacht built in 1889 for service on Ullswater in the English Lake District and since converted to the MY Raven
- USS Bellatrix (AKA-3), an Arcturus-class attack cargo ship of the United States Navy, originally built in 1941 as SS Raven for the Maritime Commission but transferred to the Navy

== See also ==
- Raven (disambiguation)
