= Richards Shipbuilders =

Richards (Shipbuilders) Ltd was a shipyard in Lowestoft, Suffolk and Great Yarmouth, Norfolk

== History ==
The precursor to the yard was started in 1876 by Samuel Richards (as S. Richards and Co), with a boatyard on the south side of the inner harbour at Lowestoft. After Samuel died in 1919, his sons took over the yard, building drifters, trawlers and paddle steamers. The yard closed from 1926 to 1930.

Bought by W. F. Cockerell of the East Anglian Ice and Cold Storage Co in the 1930s, the company was renamed Richards Ironworks. Ship repairing continued but they did not resume shipbuilding until 1935. During the Second World War, they built 85 small ships including minesweepers, 24 motor fishing vessels, a torpedo recovery ship, eight standard coasters and six Victualling Inshore Craft, a Royal Navy auxiliary vessel based on "Clyde puffers". They escaped any serious bombing and repaired many other vessels.

The company expanded in 1954 by taking over an adjoining shipyard. The new owners, the United Molasses Co, spent £250,000 modernising the facilities and renamed the yard, Richards (Shipbuilders) Ltd. During the 1950s, they predominantly built coastal tankers to carry molasses.

In the 1960s, the yard returned to its mainstay of motor trawlers and drifters, along with ten wooden Ton-class minesweepers and seaward defence boats. In 1969, United Molasses purchased Fellows Yard in Great Yarmouth and began a period of expansion to allow them to accommodate larger ships. During the 1970s, they built coastal tankers, offshore supply vessels, tugs and trawlers. Escaping nationalisation in 1977, the yard contributed a number of innovative designs to the industry. During the 1980s, the yard built a variety of vessels, including the 12 River-class minesweepers, but demand dropped and the Yarmouth yard closed in the late 1980s, with the Lowestoft yard following in 1994.
