= PS Lucy Ashton =

Clyde-built paddle steamer (1888 - 1951)

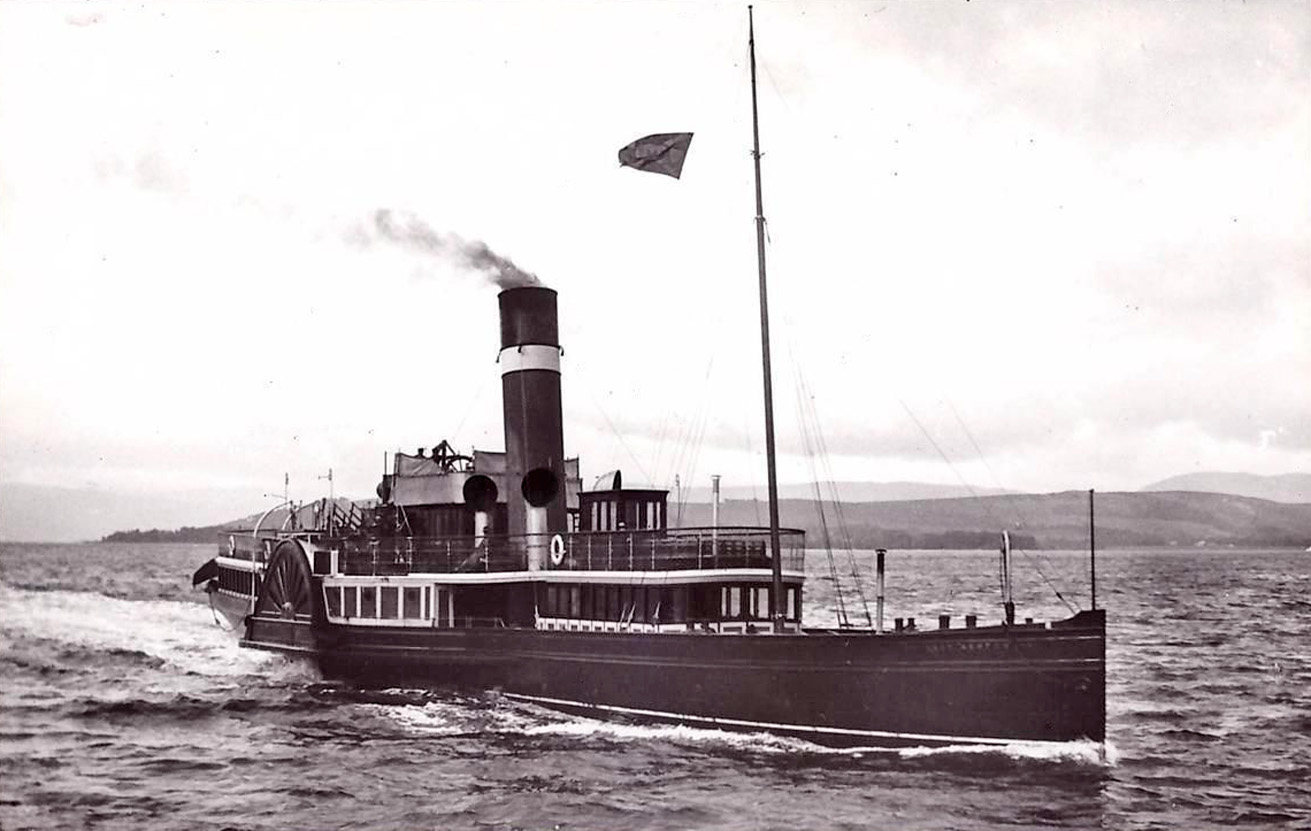
- PS Lucy Ashton as she looked sometime between 1894 and 1908

History
- Name: PS Lucy Ashton
- Owner: North British Steam Packet Co. (1888–1902); North British Railway (1902–1923); London and North Eastern Railway (1923–1948); British Transport Commission (1948–1949)
- Builder: T.B. Seath & Co. with engines supplied by Hutson & Corbett
- Launched: 24 May 1888
- Out of service: February 1949
- Fate: Scrapped after 1950

General characteristics
- Class & type: Paddle steamer
- Tonnage: 271.3 tons
- Length: 190 ft (58 m)
- Beam: 21.1 ft (6.4 m)
- Propulsion: single-diagonal engine powered by single haystack boiler

PS Lucy Ashton was a Clyde-built paddle steamer that carried passengers on the Clyde between 1888 and 1949. She was one of the longest serving Clyde steamers.

== History ==
Lucy Ashton was built by T.B. Seath & Co. at their Rutherglen shipyard for the North British Steam Packet Co. to serve on the Craigendoran to Kilmun route. She continued the tradition of naming steamers after characters in Sir Walter Scott’s novels, being named after the main character in the novel The Bride of Lammermoor. Over the years she sailed on a number of different routes visiting piers in Greenock, Garelochhead, Clynder, Gourock and Dunoon.

She was reboilered in 1901, but then the following year after her original single-diagonal engine was badly damaged she was taken to A. & J. Inglis and they replaced the engine with a compound-diagonal engine and a more powerful boiler, with her year old boiler being transferred to PS Lady Rowena. Her boilers were replaced by A. & J. Inglis again in 1923 when she became the property of the London and North Eastern Railway.

Unlike a lot of Clyde steamers, Lucy Ashton was not requisitioned by the Admiralty for naval service during either world war. She continued to sail on the Clyde during World War I although her routes were restricted by an anti-submarine boom between Dunoon and Cloch, preventing access to places like Rothesay. By 1938 she was laid up in Bowling harbour alongside PS Waverley with neither expected to return to service, but with the outbreak of the second world war while a lot of Clyde steamers were requisitioned (including Waverley), Lucy Ashton was returned to service on the Clyde although she was again restricted to the upper firth of the Clyde by the anti-submarine boom. However, with the return of PS Jeanie Deans from war service and the launch of the new PS Waverley entering service in 1947, Lucy Ashton was removed from service for the final time in February 1949.

In 1950 Lucy Ashton was handed over to the British Shipbuilding Research Association and converted to be used in resistance experiments to investigate the effects of drag and friction on a full-size hull. Her paddlewheels and sponsons were removed, and her steam engine replaced with four Rolls-Royce Derwent V engines mounted above and outboard of the hull so that they wouldn't affect the ship's hull or her wake. To slow her down, large metal flaps were added that would drop from outriggers to act as water brakes. The results of these experiments were cited in further experiments on "Lucy Ashton" models.

After the experiments were completed she was sent to be scrapped. A paddlebox carving was retained and is on display in the National Railway Museum in York, the forward deckhouse was removed and is on display in the Scottish Maritime Museum in Irvine, North Ayrshire, and her wheel was removed and donated to the Hermitage Academy in Helensburgh.

== Layout ==
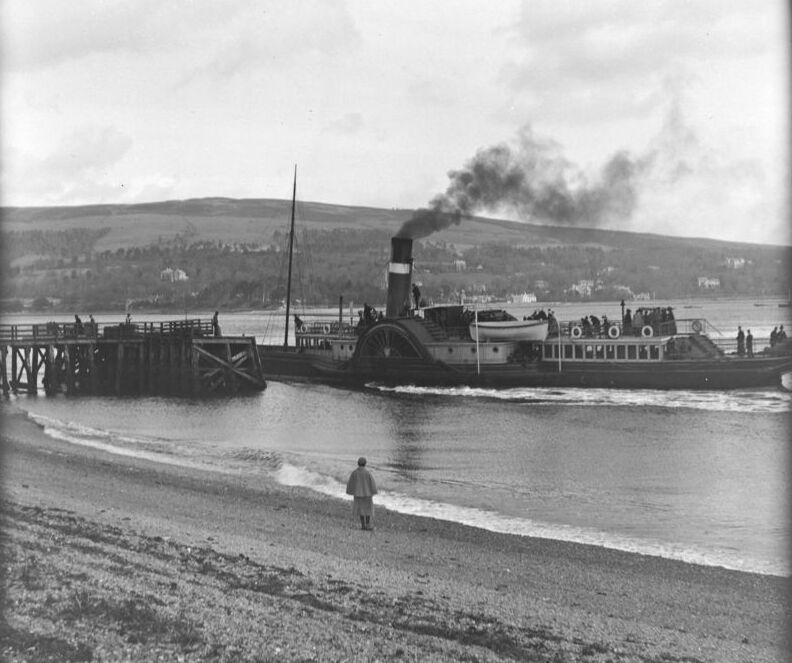
The 'Lucy Ashton' taking the Rosneath Pier in 1892

At launch she had a narrow fore saloon with passageways on either side, with a ship-wide deck saloon aft, a promenade deck above the saloons and her bridge suspended above the promenade deck between her paddleboxes. In 1894 a purser’s office was added to the promenade deck between the paddleboxes with a new bridge built above it. Originally she had staircases within her sponsons, but these were removed when her paddleboxes were replaced by A. & J. Inglis in 1903, with the staircases being situated in the middle of the promenade deck leading to the saloons below, and toilets being built in the sponsons. The outside of the paddleboxes were also updated to include a bust of her namesake character and her name around the outer edge. The final major structural change was in 1908 when the small purser's office behind the funnel was replaced with a larger deckhouse, that contained a purser's office but also a cabin for the Captain and a shelter for passengers A small deckhouse shelter was also added forward of the funnel.
