= MY Raven =

Excursion vessel

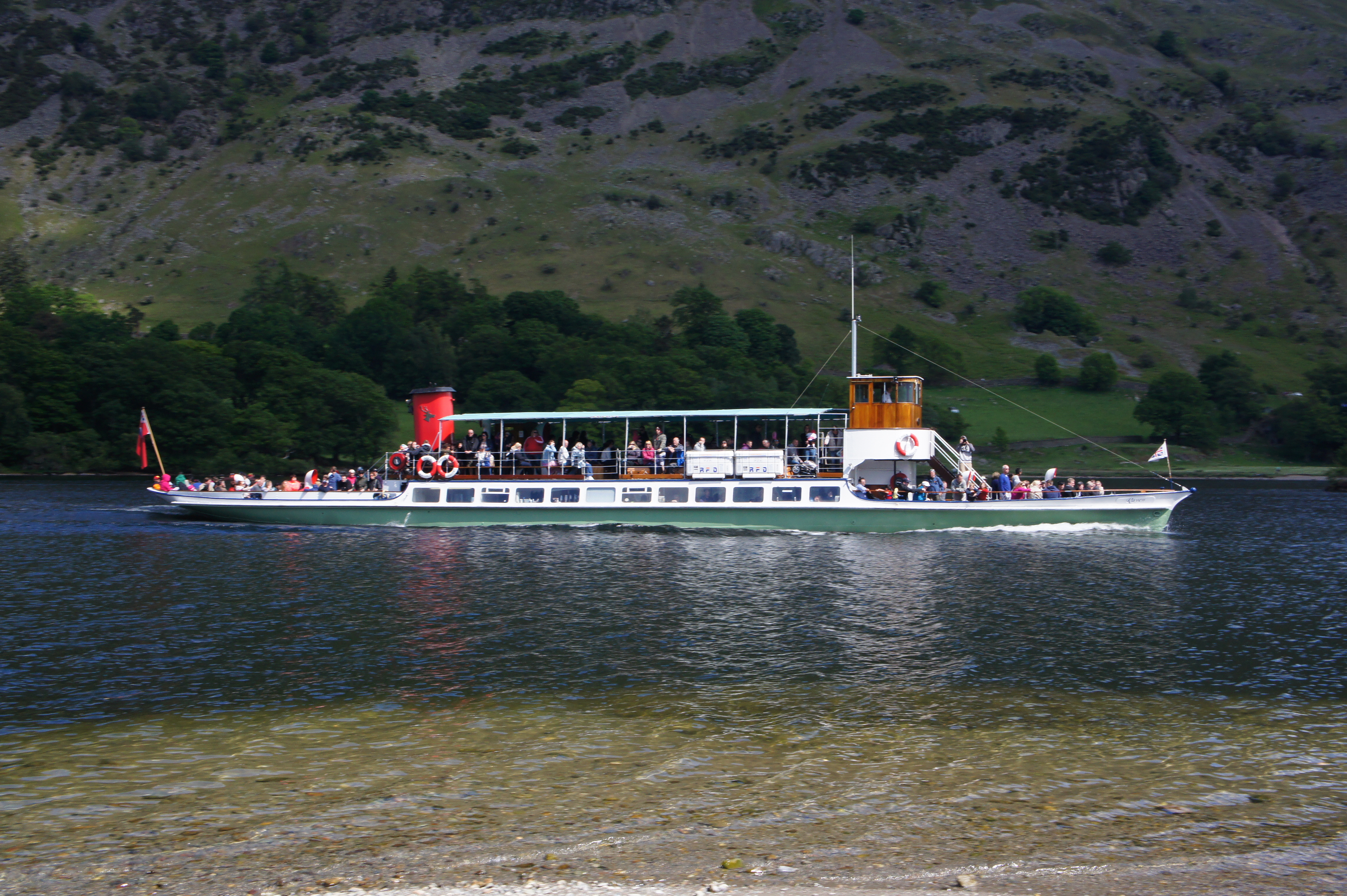
- The Raven at Glenridding on Ullswater

History

United Kingdom
- Name: Raven
- Owner: Ullswater 'Steamers' and predecessors
- Route: Ullswater
- Builder: T.B. Seath & Co.
- Launched: 1889

General characteristics
- Type: Motor yacht (ex-steam yacht)
- Tonnage: 63 GT
- Length: 111.93 ft (34.12 m)
- Beam: 14.98 ft (4.57 m)
- Draught: 2.85 ft (0.87 m)
- Propulsion: Diesel engine
- Capacity: 150 passengers

MY Raven is a passenger vessel operating for Ullswater 'Steamers' on the lake of Ullswater in the English Lake District, where she has spent her entire working life. She was built in 1889 as a steam vessel, but converted to diesel power in 1934. She is a member of the National Historic Fleet.

The Raven has a length of 111.93 feet (34.12 m), a beam of 14.98 feet (4.57 m) and a draught of 2.85 feet (0.87 m). Her gross tonnage is 63, and she can carry 150 passengers. She is the largest vessel in the Ullswater 'Steamers' fleet.

== History ==
The Raven was ordered by the Ullswater Steam Navigation Company, a predecessor of the current owners. Like her older sister ship, Lady of the Lake, she was built by T.B. Seath & Co. at Rutherglen near Glasgow, and transported overland from there to Ullswater, where she was launched on 11 July 1889. She was commissioned at the suggestion of Thomas Cook, in response to the growing popularity of Ullswater as a tourist destination, and because the previous year a breakdown of Lady of the Lake forced the cancellation of services. She was named after Ravencragg, the lakeside home of company director William Hugh Parkin.

In 1912, Raven was made a temporary royal yacht when the German Emperor Wilhelm II visited Ullswater during his stay with the 5th Earl of Lonsdale at Lowther Castle. Her decks were painted yellow, the Earl's personal colour, for the occasion. In 1934, Raven was converted from steam and fitted with twin diesel engines.

== Gallery ==
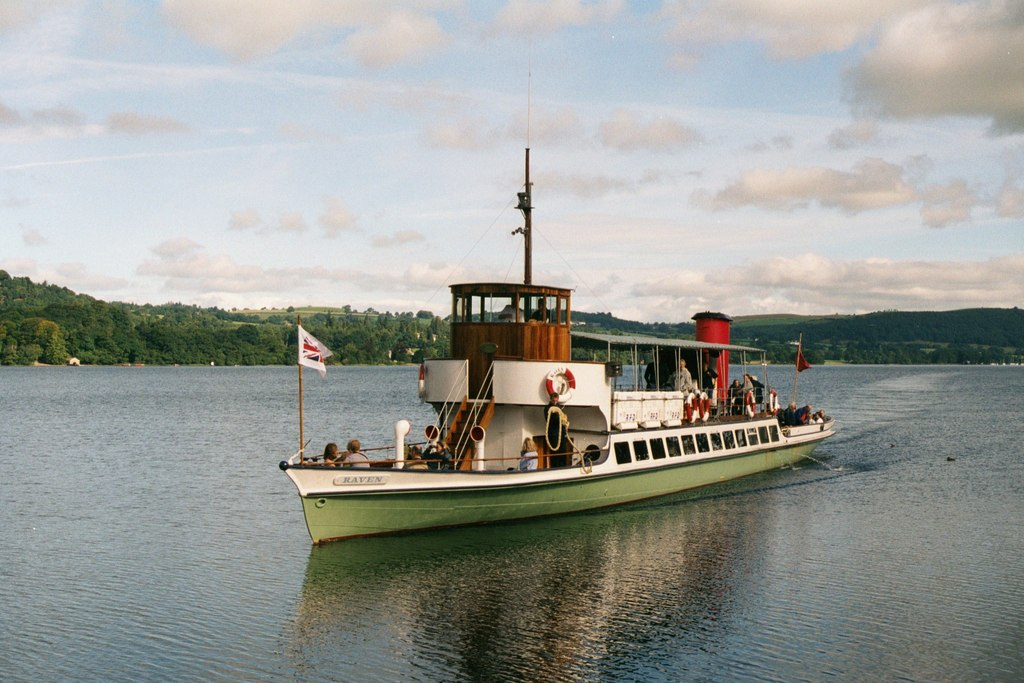
Raven approaching Howtown Pier

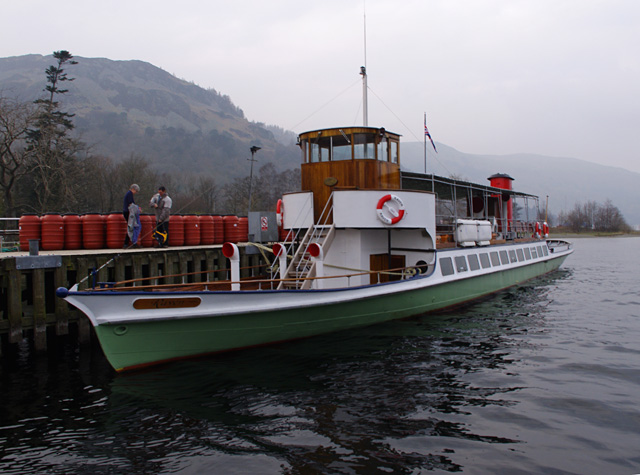
Raven at Glenridding

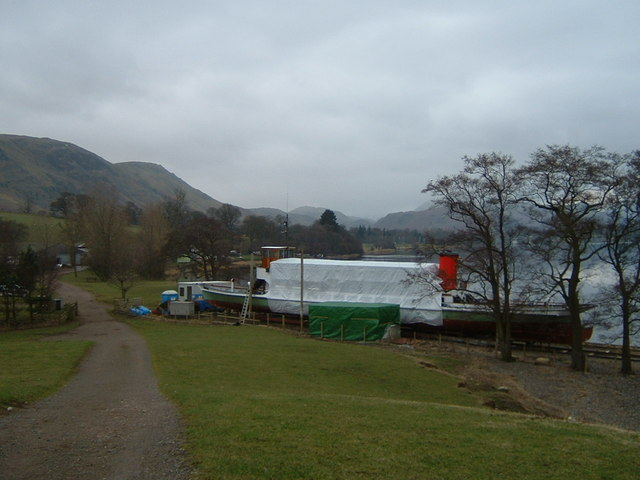
Raven on the slip at Waterside
