= PS Lune =

Passenger vessel (1892–1913)

History

- Name: 1892–1913: PS Lune; 1913–1923: PS Melcombe Regis
- Owner: 1892–1913: Lancashire and Yorkshire Railway; 1913–1923: Cosens & Co Ltd, Weymouth
- Operator: 1892–1913: Lancashire and Yorkshire Railway; 1913–1923: Cosens & Co Ltd, Weymouth
- Port of registry: (United Kingdom)
- Route: 1892–1913: Fleetwood – Heysham and Blackpool
- Builder: T.B. Seath & Co. of Rutherglen
- Launched: 1892
- Out of service: 1923
- Fate: Scrapped 1923

General characteristics
- Tonnage: 253 gross register tons (GRT)
- Length: 129 ft (39 m)
- Beam: 24 ft (7.3 m)

PS Lune was a paddle steamer passenger vessel operated by the Lancashire and Yorkshire Railway from 1892 to 1913.

== History ==
Lune was built by T.B. Seath & Co. of Rutherglen for the Irish Sea joint service of the Lancashire and Yorkshire Railway and London and North Western Railway in 1892. She operated a passenger service from Fleetwood to Heysham with pleasure trips also to Blackpool and Morecambe.

In June 1913 she was sold to Cosens & Co Ltd in Weymouth and operated as PS Melcombe Regis on Cosen's Admiralty contract as a tender between Portland and Navy vessels at anchorage outside the harbour.

In 1918 the vessel was transferred to the inshore minesweeping service working in and around Belfast Lough and was based at Larne. In November of that year she was released back to her owners and in 1919 was laid up at Weymouth still in her wartime grey.

She was scrapped in 1923/4 at Felixstowe.
