= Glenridding House =

Recency era building in Glenridding on Ullswater

Coordinates: 54.5469°N 2.9493°W

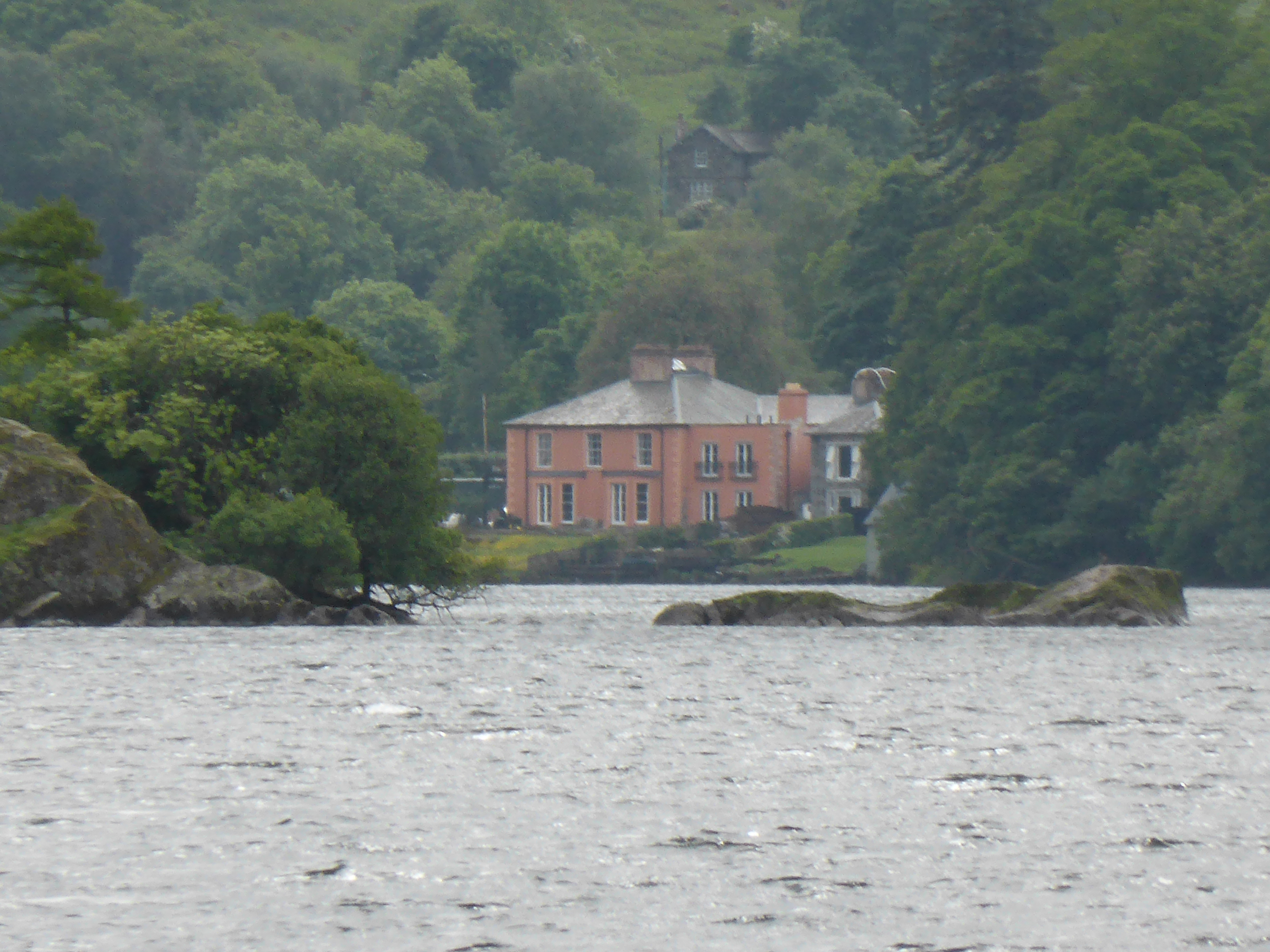
Glenridding House, Ullswater

Glenridding House is a Regency era building in Glenridding on Ullswater, constructed between 1807 and 1814. It was a private summer villa until about 1860 and then became a guest house. It has recently been fully restored and is now a country house bed and breakfast and wedding venue. The building is recorded in the National Heritage List for England as a designated Grade II listed building.

== Early history ==
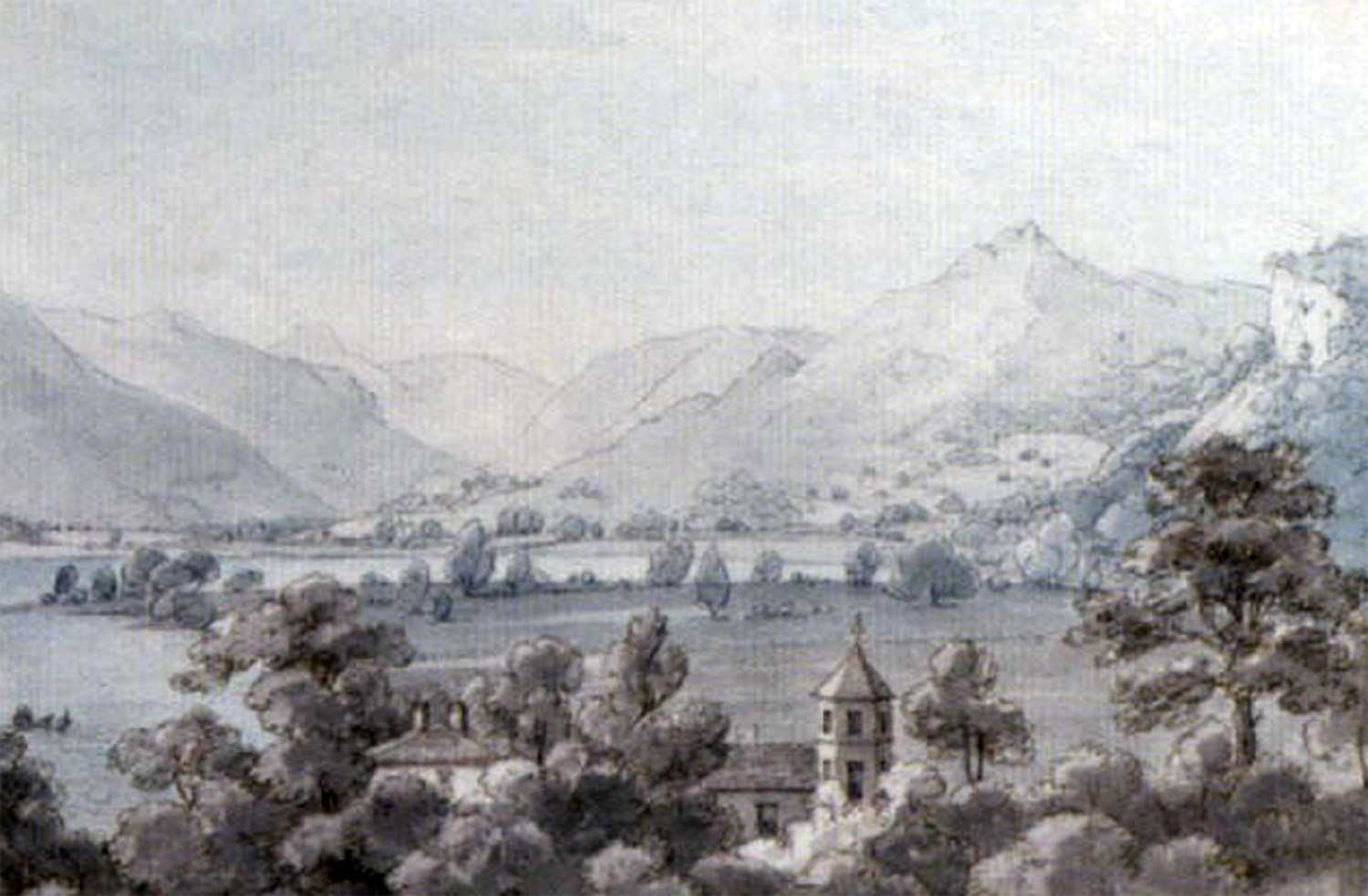
Drawing by Thomas Sunderland in about 1820 called "Glenridding on Ullswater" showing Glenridding House in the foreground

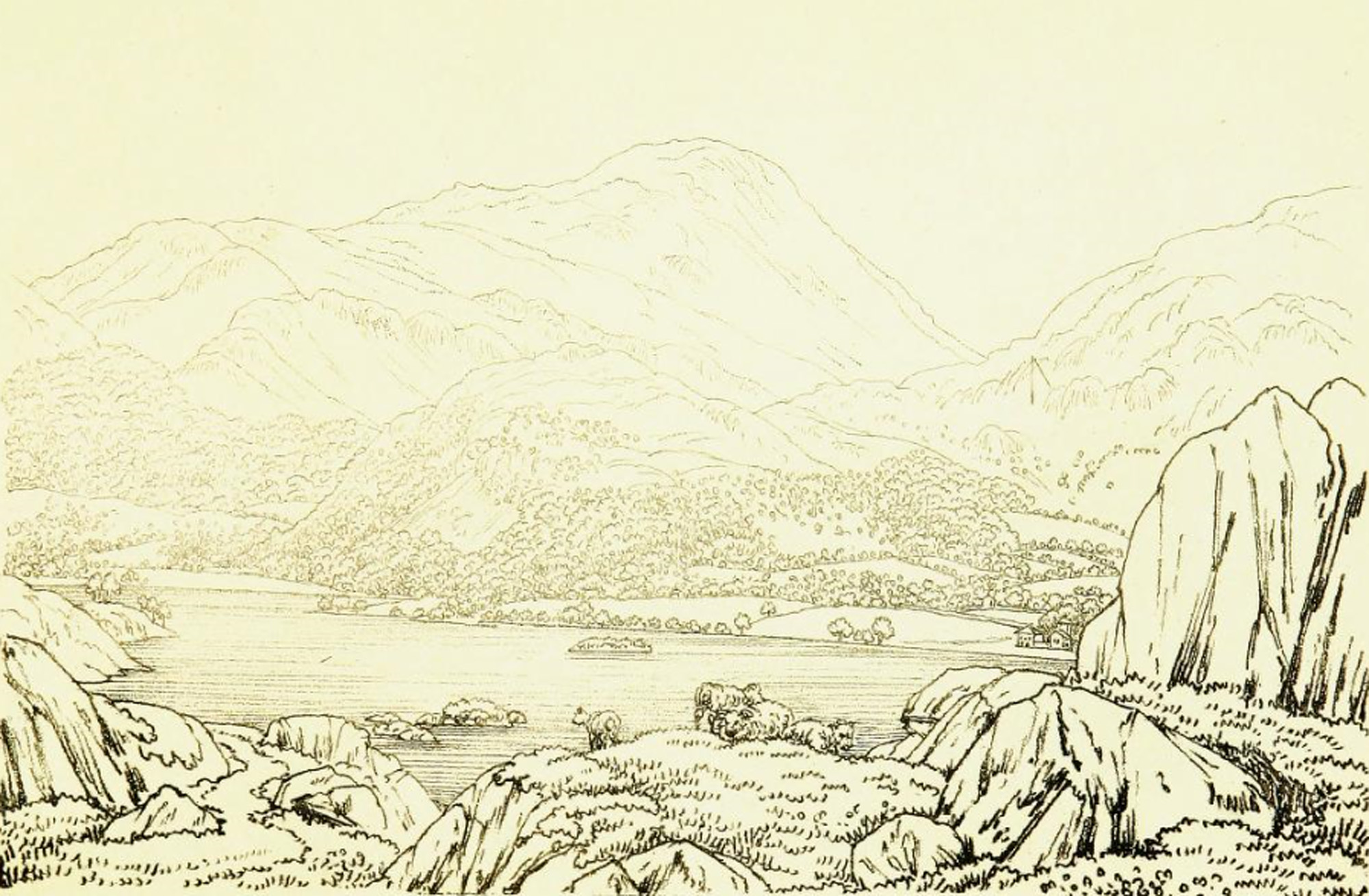
Drawing by William Green in 1814 called "Ullswater Head" showing Glenridding House in the background on the right

The Reverend Henry Askew (1766–1852) who was the Rector of Greystoke, built the house in about 1810. Records show that he bought the land from John Mounsey who owned the Manor of Glenridding, in 1807. His house was completed by 1814. This is known because in this year William Green, the famous English landscape painter published a series of prints each of which was described. The description for No 53 called “Ullswater Head” (which is shown) states “the house not long ago erected by Rev Henry Askew is on the right.”

Henry was born in 1766 in Lancashire. His father Anthony Askew was a doctor and owned Storrs Hall In Lancashire. In 1799 Henry married Anne Sunderland who was the daughter of the well known artist Thomas Sunderland. In about 1820 Thomas drew a view of Ullswater in which he included Glenridding House. This drawing is shown. He also drew a picture of the house which he called “The Rev Askew’s House at Glenridding”. This artwork is held by the Fitzwilliam Museum.

Henry died in 1852 and his son Henry William Askew sold the property. The advertisement for the sale in 1854 contained the following description.

To be sold on the banks of Ullswater, one mile from Patterdale, the Mansion House of Glenridding with 25 acres of land sloping down to the lake including most productive gardens and pleasure grounds with green and hot houses in full bearing.

The house contains dining room, drawing room (40 foot long), morning room, 8 bed rooms, 4 dressing rooms, 3 water closets and ample accommodation for servants. Also offices and cellars, coach houses and stabling for 10 horses and gardener’s house.

The above is one of the most admired places in the Lake District and the scenery stands unrivalled.

A daily post passes and re-passes the gate as does also two four horse coaches during the summer.

After the sale of the house in 1854, the property became mostly accommodation for tourists and visitors. One of these was Charles Darwin who holidayed at Glenridding House in 1881.

== Charles Darwin at Glenridding House ==
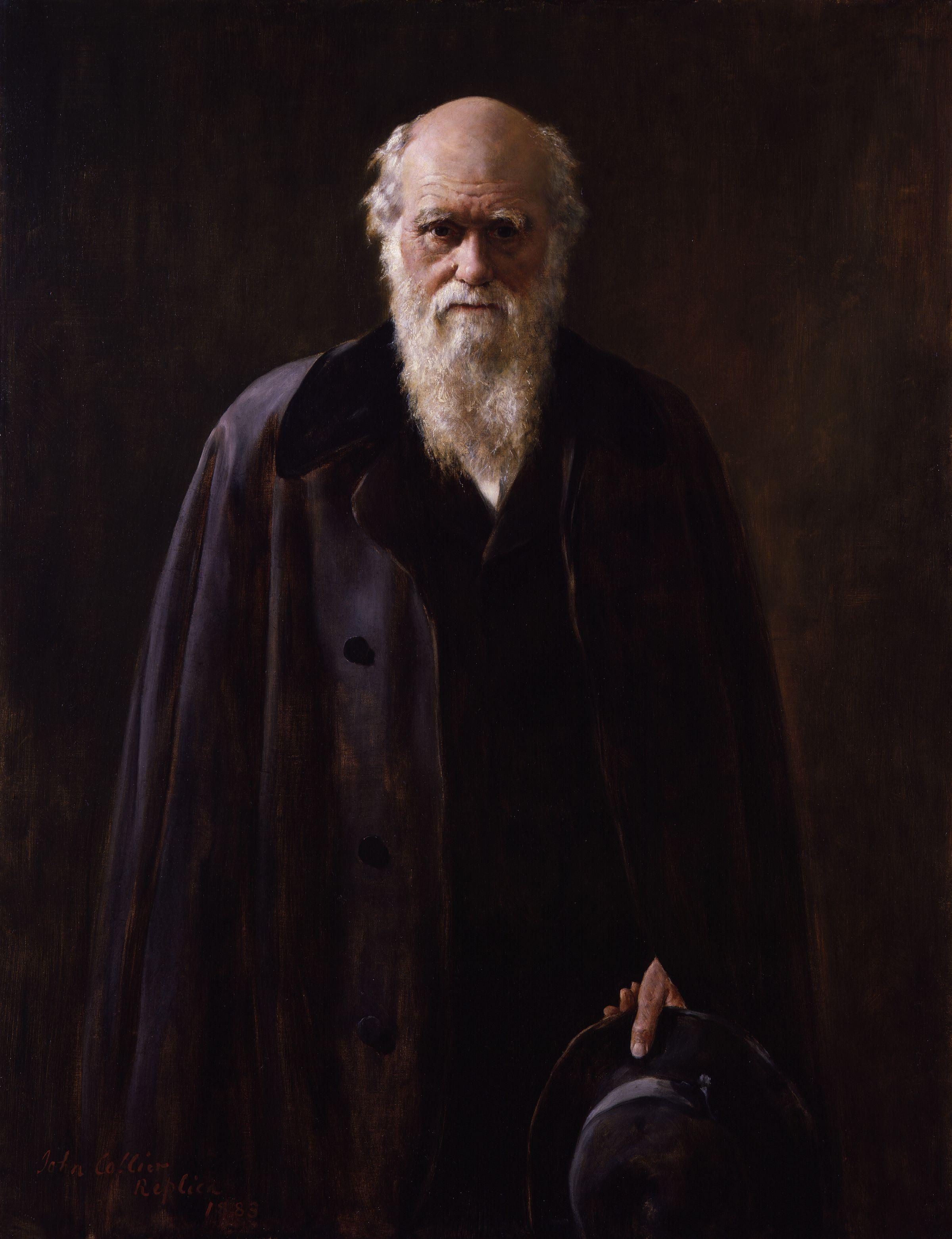
Charles Darwin

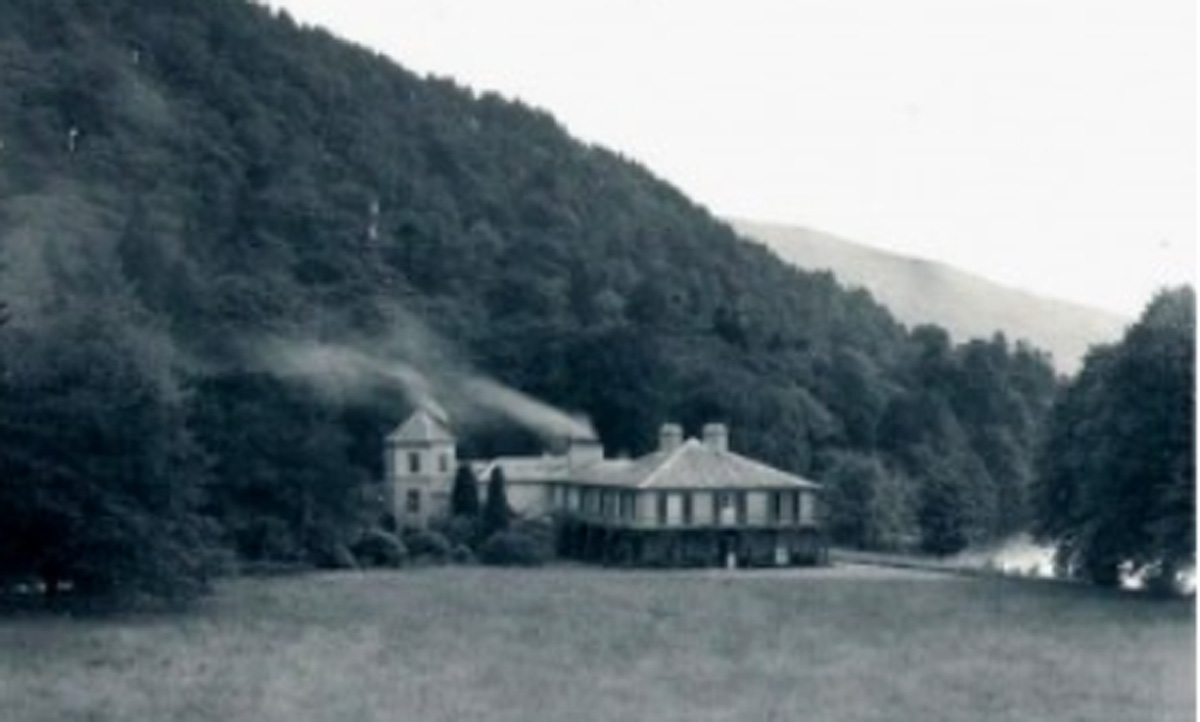
Glenridding House circa 1900

In June 1881 Charles Darwin stayed at Glenridding House with his family for a five-week holiday. His daughter Hanrietta wrote about their stay. She said:

it was an especial happiness to my mother for the rest of her life to remember her little strolls with my father to the side of the lake. I have a vivid picture in my mind of the two often setting off alone together for a certain favourite walk by the edge of some fine rocks going sheer down into the lake

Darwin himself wrote of the holiday, saying "This place is magnificently beautiful, and I enjoy the scenery".

== See also ==
- Listed buildings in Patterdale
