= Glenridding =

Village in Cumbria, England

Coordinates: 54.544°N 2.953°W

- Village
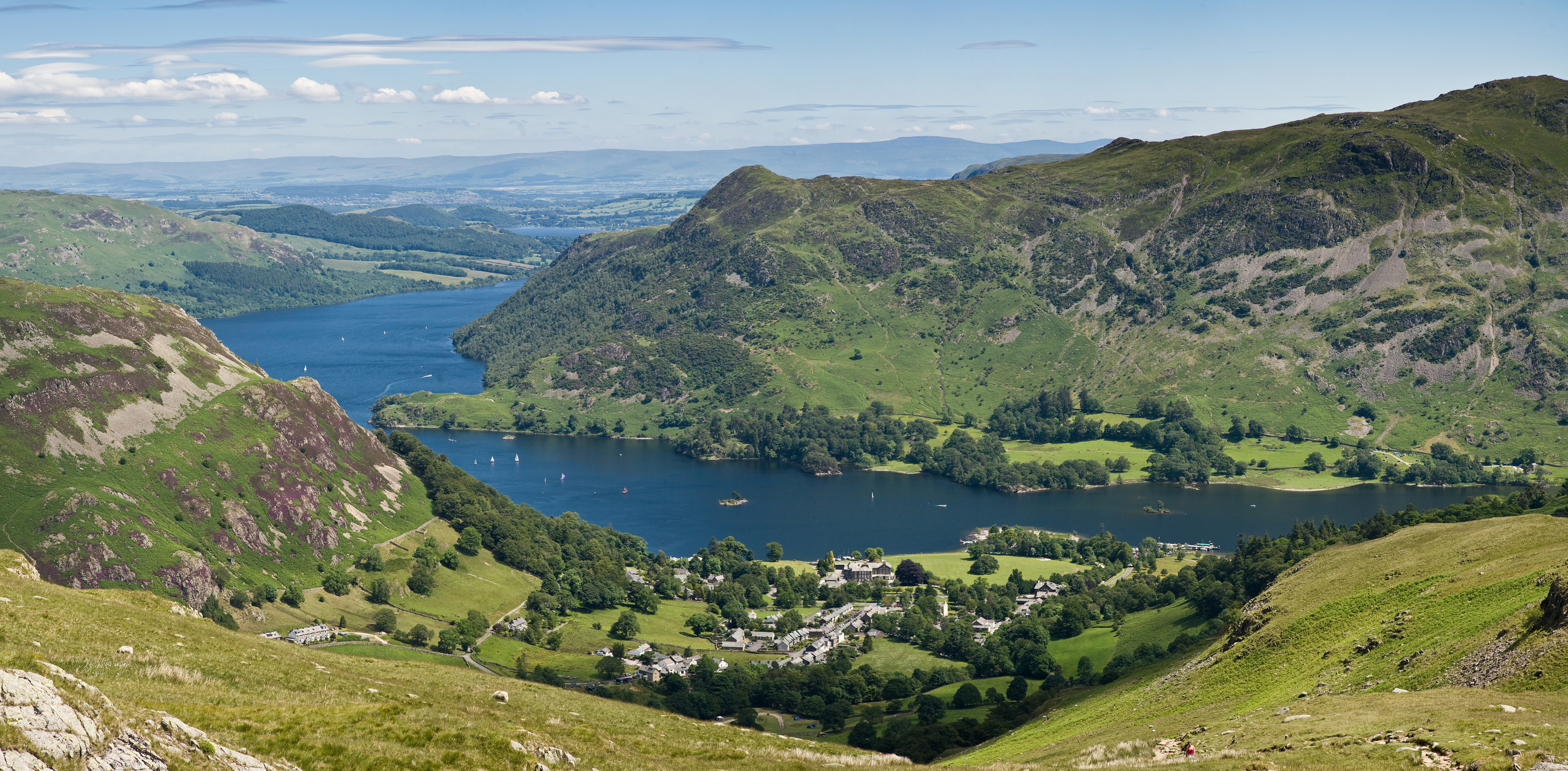
- Looking down on Glenridding village and Ullswater from the west

- Location in the former Eden District Location within Cumbria
- OS grid reference: NY383170
- Civil parish: Patterdale
- Unitary authority: Westmorland and Furness
- Ceremonial county: Cumbria
- Region: North West
- Country: England
- Sovereign state: United Kingdom
- Post town: PENRITH
- Postcode district: CA11
- Dialling code: 017684
- Police: Cumbria
- Fire: Cumbria
- Ambulance: North West
- UK Parliament: Westmorland and Lonsdale

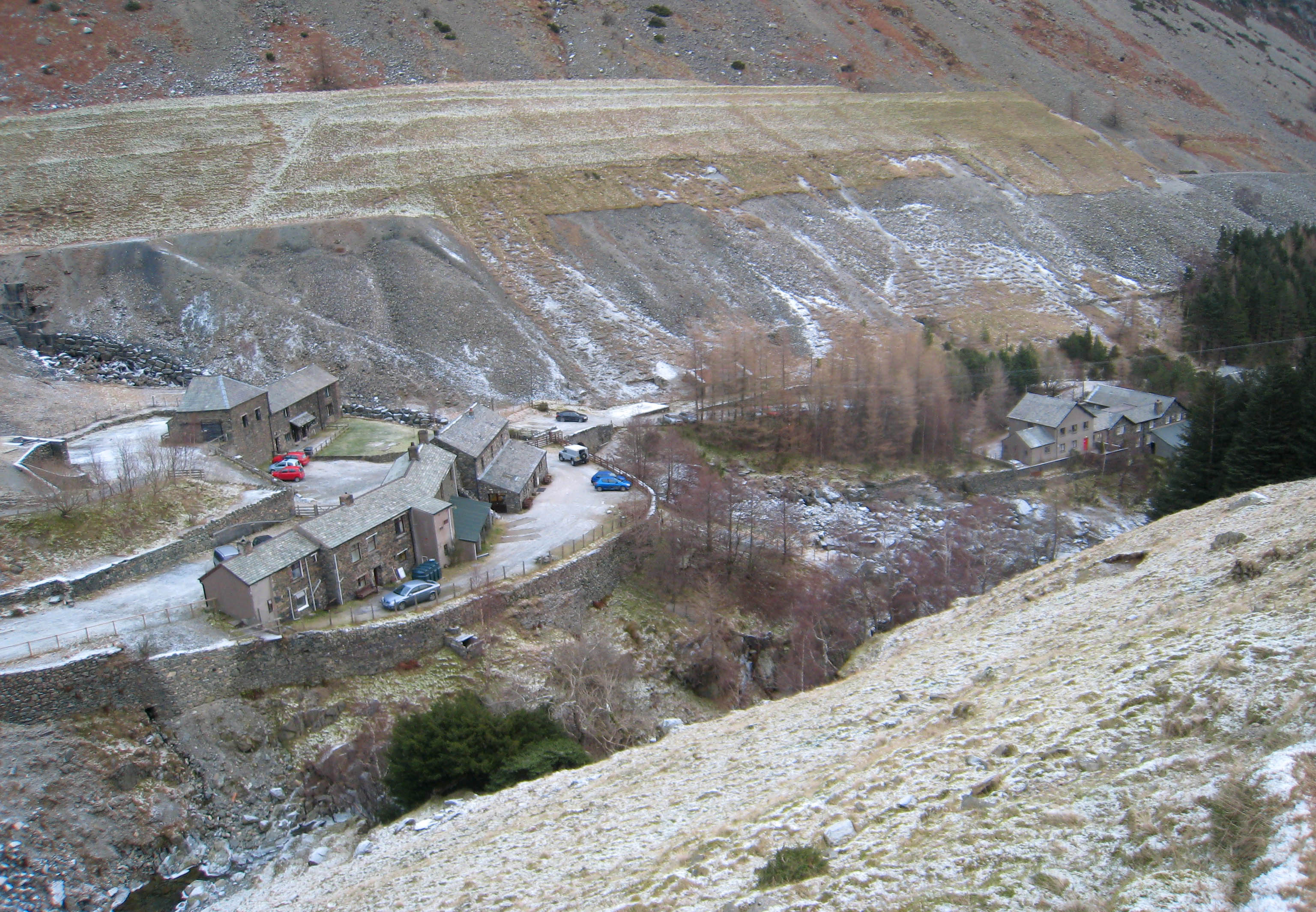
Greenside in 2009. The buildings seen here are the lower part of the mine complex which spreads up the hillside.

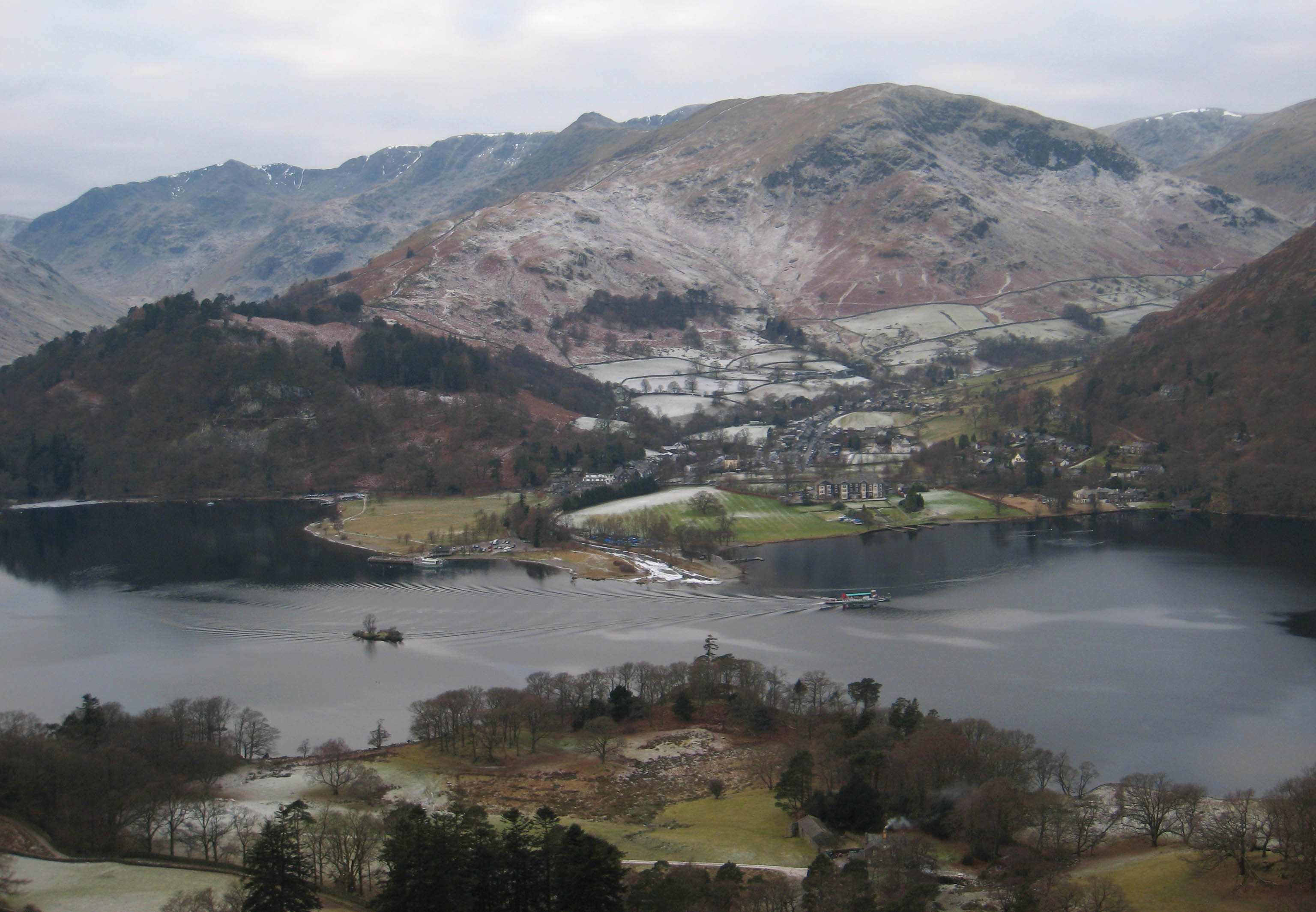
Glenridding across Ullswater, with one of the steamers leaving the pier

Glenridding is a village at the southern end of Ullswater, in the English Lake District. The village is popular with mountain walkers, who can scale England's third-highest mountain, Helvellyn, and many other challenging peaks from there.

== Toponymy ==
The name Glenridding is generally agreed to be Cumbric in origin, with the first element being *glinn, 'valley', and the second *redïn, 'ferns, bracken' (cf. Welsh glyn rhedyn), giving a meaning of 'valley overgrown with bracken'. First recorded as Glenredyn in around 1290, the name's present form is thought to have been influenced by the Middle English element ridding, 'clearing'.

== Geography ==
Glenridding is in the civil parish of Patterdale.

On 6 December 2015, Storm Desmond caused extensive and devastating flooding to the village, with torrential rainfall and rivers bursting their banks. Four days later, more rainfall caused rivers to burst their banks once again, leading to even more flood damage to businesses and homes in the village. Following the floods the community set up a Flood Action Group who continue to work on recovery and resilience measures to reduce the risk of future flooding.

== Community and culture ==
Each year, on Easter Monday, a duck race is organised by the local mountain rescue team to raise funds. The village also has a rich sporting history, particularly in the traditional Lakeland sport of Fell Running and each September the Helvellyn Triathlon is held at Jenkins' Field by the shores of Ullswater, at one time considered the toughest triathlon in the UK.

=== Amenities ===
The village has accommodation including two youth hostels and camping sites. Glenridding House provides luxury bed and breakfast accommodation. There is also a tourist information centre, Ullswater Information Centre.

== Greenside Mine ==
Above the village is the site of the former Greenside Mine, once the largest lead mine in the Lake District. Lead ore was discovered in the 18th century and the site was mined from the second half of the 18th century until the mine closed in 1962. Without the mine, the houses and economy of Glenridding and the surrounding area would not have existed.

== Ullswater Steamers ==
Glenridding is home to the Ullswater 'Steamers', a leisure boat trip company which operates five vessels from the pier at Glenridding. The company was founded to provide a transport link for goods from Glenridding to Pooley Bridge and onwards to Penrith.

== See also ==
- Listed buildings in Patterdale
