= Listed buildings in Patterdale =

Patterdale is a civil parish in Westmorland and Furness, Cumbria, England. It contains 37 listed buildings that are recorded in the National Heritage List for England. Of these, one is listed at Grade I, the highest of the three grades, one is at Grade II*, the middle grade, and the others are at Grade II, the lowest grade. The parish is in the Lake District National Park, and contains the villages of Patterdale, Glenridding and Hartsop, but mainly consists of countryside, moorland and fells. Most of the listed buildings are houses, cottages, farmhouses and farm buildings, and the other listed buildings are bridges and a church

== Key ==
Grade	Criteria
I	Buildings of exceptional interest, sometimes considered to be internationally important
II*	Particularly important buildings of more than special interest
II	Buildings of national importance and special interest

== Buildings ==
Name and location	Photograph	Date	Notes	Grade
Brotherfield Cottage; 54.50916°N 2.91980°W	—	16th century	A stone house with crude quoins, a slate roof, and two storeys. There are two doors, one boarded, and three windows in each floor.	II
Hartsop Hall and farm buildings 54.49999°N 2.93054°W		16th century	A large farmhouse, the original part faces north, a west wing was added in the 17th century, and a south wing in the following century. The building is in stone and slate rubble, and has a stone-flagged roof, and is in two storeys. The north front has a doorway with a moulded lintel, and the older wings have mullioned windows. The south wing contains the entrance front and an open barn extending to form a porch, and the windows in this wing are sashes.	I
Fellyeat; 54.50917°N 2.91659°W	—	Late 16th century	A stone house with a slate roof, two storeys, a gabled wing, and a staircase wing containing a spiral staircase. The windows are modern.	II
Corn drying kiln, How Green Farm; 54.51024°N 2.91457°W	—	Late 16th or early 17th century	The building is in stone with a roof of heavy stone flags. There are two storeys, the main door has a large wooden lintel, and a smaller door has a stone lintel, a crude dripstone and a ventilation slit above. In the front is a square yard enclosed by stone walls.	II
Lane Head; 54.52161°N 2.93360°W	—	Late 16th to early 17th century	A stone house that has a slate roof with stepped gables. There are two storeys, seven casement windows in each floor, and a modern lean-to porch on the front.	II
Glencoyne and farm buildings 54.55961°N 2.95378°W		Early 17th century	The farmhouse is in stone, and the roof is in slate with stepped gables. There are two storeys, and a rear wing dating from about 1700. In the centre of the front is a gabled porch, there are five windows in the ground floor and four above, all are small-paned with small opening lights and are deeply set in thick walls. Attached to the farmhouse, and extending to the east, are farm buildings containing segmental-headed windows.	II*
Rattlebeck Cottage; 54.54360°N 2.96043°W	—	Early 17th century	The cottage has thick stone walls on a boulder base, it is roughcast, and has a stone-flagged roof. There are two low storeys and seven casement windows, three on the ground floor, two in the upper floor, and two at an intermediate level on the right. At the rear is a catslide roof.	II
Eagle Farmhouse; 54.54318°N 2.95216°W	—	1635	A stone farmhouse on large boulders with a stone-flagged roof. It has two low storeys and a gabled rear wing, giving an L-shaped plan. There is one modern window, the other being sashes. Inside the farmhouse is an inglenook.	II
Wall End Farmhouse and ban 54.51483°N 2.93972°W	—	1630s	The farmhouse and barn to the right are in stone with a slate roof. There are two storeys and four bays, a gabled porch, casement windows, and a slate hood mould above the ground floor windows.	II
1 and 2 Grassthwaitehow; 54.53543°N 2.95301°W	—	17th century	A pair of houses, extended to the east in about 1706, built on a boulder base. They are in rendered stone, with a slate roof. They have two storeys and a rear wing. There are two doors and four windows on the ground floor with a continuous hood mould above them, and six window in the upper floor. The windows in No. 1 are casements, in No. 2 they are sashes, and in the rear wing they are horizontally-sliding sashes.	II
Bank End; 54.50884°N 2.91691°W	—	17th century	A house in stone and slate rubble with a stone-flagged roof and two low storeys. At the rear is a spinning gallery approached by stone steps.	II
Caudale Beck Farmhouse; 54.49597°N 2.92720°W	—	17th century	The farmhouse has thick stone walls, a slate roof, two storeys, and a rear wing. Above the door is a gabled hood, and there are three irregularly spaced modern casement windows in each floor.	II
Chamberlain Cottage; 54.50922°N 2.91282°W	—	17th century (probable)	A roughcast stone house with a slate roof. It has two low storeys, a lean-to porch, and casement windows.	II
Cow Bridge; 54.51215°N 2.92425°W		17th century	This originated as a packhorse bridge, and has since been widened. It is in stone and consists of a single segmental arch.	II
Crookbeck Farmhouse; 54.53190°N 2.92641°W	—	17th century	A stone house with a slate roof, two low storeys, and three bays. On the front is a gabled porch, sash windows, and a dripstone above the ground floor.	II
Dale Head; 54.50959°N 2.91245°W	—	17th century (probable)	A stone house with a slate roof, stepped gables, and two storeys. In the ground floor are modern windows with a continuous dripstone above them, and in the upper floor are casement windows. There are modern dormers in the roof.	II
Deepdale Hall; 54.51883°N 2.93522°W	—	17th century	A stone house with a slate roof that was rebuilt after a fire in the 19th century. It has two storeys, five bays, two gabled porches, and modern windows.	II
Elmhow and cart sheds 54.52696°N 2.97064°W	—	17th century	A stone house with a slate roof and two storeys. There are six small-paned windows on the ground floor and four above. with dripstones above the ground floor windows. To the right are stone cart sheds with rough quoins, flagged roofs, and a stepped gables.	II
High Beckside; 54.50964°N 2.91482°W	—	17th century	The house is in stone and slate rubble and has a stone-flagged roof with stepped flags on the gables. There are two low storeys, and on the front are two doors and casement windows. At the rear is a central catslide roof over a scullery, another catslide roof to the right forming a porch, and stone steps leading to a first floor doorway.	II
The How Cottage and farm buildings 54.51074°N 2.91487°W	—	Mid 17th century (probable)	Originally a farmhouse and byre with a cross-passage, later altered and used for other purposes. It is in stone and has a stone-slate roof. There are two storeys and various altered or inserted openings, the windows dating from the 19th century, and there are external steps. Inside the building is a large fireplace with a bressumer. Separate from this building, but included in the listing are a two-bay stable, and a five-bay barn.	II
How Green Farmhouse and farm buildings 54.50995°N 2.91433°W	—	17th century	The farmhouse and farm buildings are in stone with a slate roof and they have two storeys. The house has a modern door, three windows in each floor, and above the ground floor windows is a continuous dripstone. To the left is a barn, beyond that are shippons at right angles, and to the right are stables.	II
Low House and farm buildings 54.50994°N 2.91605°W	—	17th century	This is a stone house with two storeys that formerly had a spinning gallery. On the front is a gabled porch, there are two windows on the ground floor and three in the upper floor, all of them sashes. On both sides of the house are farm buildings of various types.	II
Parsey House and barn 54.50989°N 2.91410°W	—	17th century	A house built in slate rubble with a slate roof. There are two low storeys and a gabled wing on the right. On the front is a porch and sash windows, above which is a continuous dripstone. To the left is a barn under the same roof.	II
Pasture Beck Bridge; 54.50847°N 2.91225°W		17th century	Originally a packhorse bridge, it is now a footbridge crossing Pasture Beck. The bridge consists of wedge-shaped stone forming a round arch. There is no parapet.	II
Patterdale Hall; 54.53695°N 2.94653°W		17th century	The hall was altered on a number of occasions, particularly by Anthony Salvin in 1845–50. It is in stone with quoins, and has an irregular plan. In the centre is a four-stage tower that has a window with a balustraded balcony. On the garden front is a large two-storey five-sided bay window, and at the rear is a porte-cochère. There are attached a gatehouse, and a stable block with a U-shaped plan that has an Italianate clock tower and a former belfry.	II
Thorn House; 54.50973°N 2.91465°W	—	17th century	The house is built in slate rubble and has a slate roof. There are two low storeys, and a main entrance in the gable end, with a small window above. At the rear. facing the road, are stone steps leading up to a spinning gallery. On the front are casement windows in the upper floor, and a slate dripstone over the ground floor.	II
Wallend Bridge; 54.51431°N 2.93991°W	—	17th century	The bridge carries a footpath over Deepdale Beck. It is in stone, and consists of a single segmental arch with a solid parapet.	II
Wordsworth Cottage (Broadhow); 54.53582°N 2.92846°W	—	1670	A stone house with a stone-flagged roof and two low storeys. On the front is a lean-to porch and modern windows, two in the ground floor and three in the upper floor. To the left is a former stable, and to the right is a modern extension.	II
Mireside; 54.50962°N 2.91387°W	—	Late 17th century	A stone house with two storeys, and four windows in each floor, since modernised.	II
Greenbank Farmhouse; 54.52376°N 2.93207°W	—	1677	A stone farmhouse with a slate roof, it has two storeys and four bays. There are two doors, and the windows are sashes.	II
Beck Side; 54.50975°N 2.91542°W	—	17th or early 18th century	The house is in stone and slate rubble, with quoins and a slate roof. There are two storeys, three bays, a central doorway, and sash windows.	II
Moss Side and barn 54.52201°N 2.93304°W	—	Early 18th century	The house and barn are in stone with a slate roof, and have two storeys. On the front of the house is a slate porch, and the windows are sashes. The barn is to the right under the same roof, and to the left is a small lean-to.	II
Deepdale Cottage; 54.52160°N 2.92956°W	—	18th century	The house is in stone and slate rubble, and has a slate roof. There are two storeys and three bays. In the centre is a gabled porch, and the windows are sashes.	II
Hoghouse; 54.50763°N 2.90145°W	—	18th century	The building was used to winter young sheep, and is in local slate rubble with quoins and has a slate roof with a crow-stepped east gable. It is built into a slope and has two levels. The openings include two doorways, each with a stone lintel, square openings, a ventilation slit, and a triangular ventilator.	II
Yew Tree Cottage; 54.52138°N 2.92940°W		Late Georgian	Originally two cottages, later combined into a single dwelling, it is in stone and slate rubble, and has a slate roof. There are two storeys and two bays. In the centre is a double porch, the windows are sashes, and there is a small round window in the gable.	II
Glenridding House; 54.54697°N 2.94904°W		Before 1819	A stuccoed house with a square plan, quoins, and a hipped slate roof. There are two storeys and an entrance front of three bays. On the entrance front is a cast iron verandah with five round arches on clustered columns, and a balcony above. On the front facing the lake are two canted bay windows with balconies. The windows are sashes.	II
St Patrick's Church; 54.53663°N 2.93984°W		1853	The church is built on the site of an earlier church, it was designed by Anthony Salvin in Gothic Revival (Decorated) style, and was extended in 1995. The church is built in Lakeland slate with quoins, and it has a Westmorland slate roof. It consists of a nave with a south porch, and a chancel with a northeast vestry and tower. The tower has three stages and a saddleback roof. Inside the church is an original embroidery by Ann Macbeth depicting the Good Shepherd.	II
