= MY Lady of the Lake =

Passenger vessel on Ullswater, England

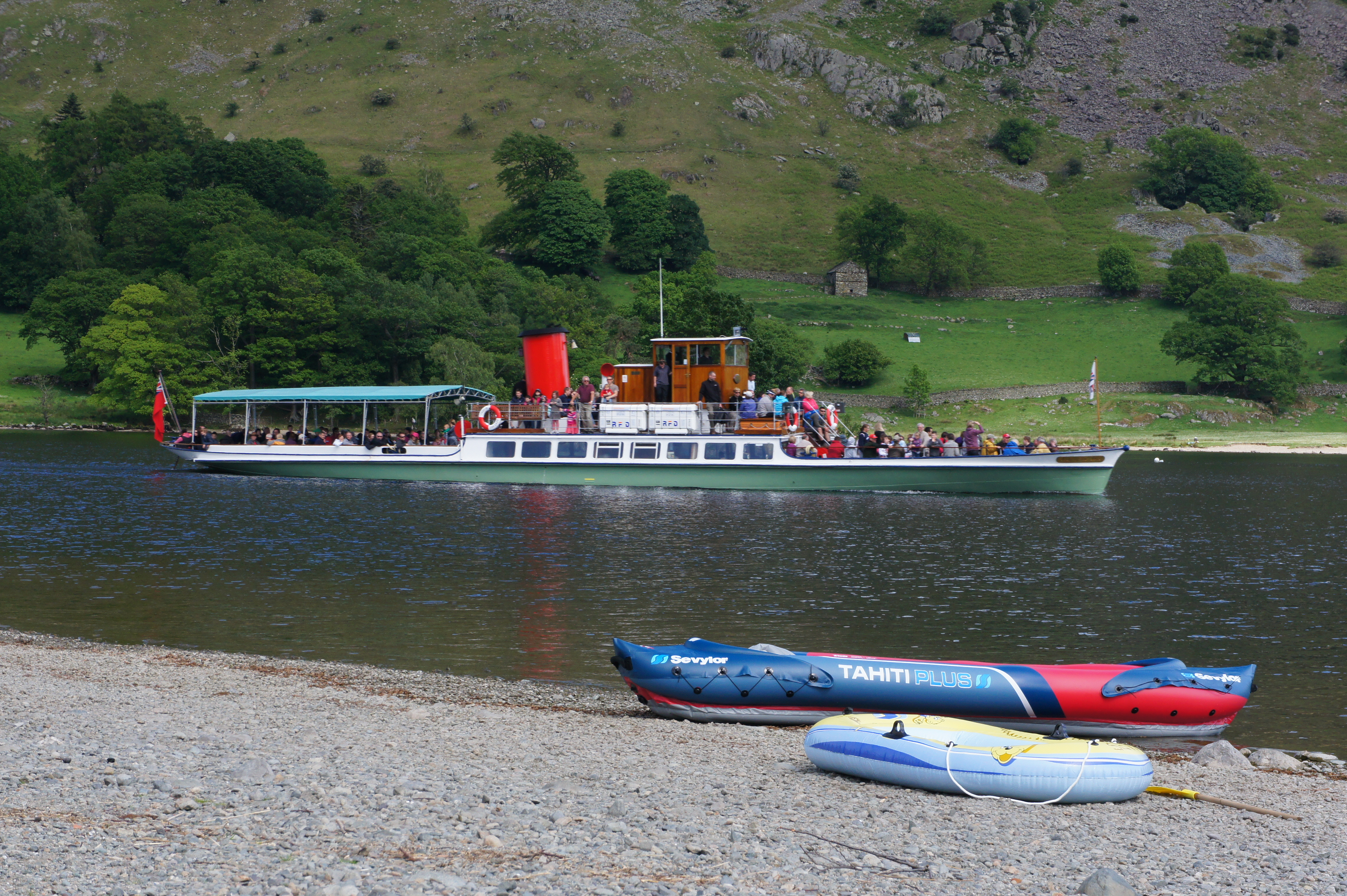
- The Lady of the Lake at Glenridding on Ullswater

History

United Kingdom
- Name: MY Lady of the Lake
- Owner: Ullswater 'Steamers' and predecessors
- Route: Ullswater
- Builder: T.B. Seath & Co.
- Launched: 1877

General characteristics
- Type: Motor Yacht (ex-Steam Yacht)
- Tonnage: 43 (gross)
- Length: 96.95 feet (29.55 m)
- Beam: 14.75 feet (4.50 m)
- Draught: 2.39 feet (0.73 m)
- Propulsion: Diesel
- Capacity: 200 Passengers

The MY Lady of the Lake is a passenger vessel operating for Ullswater 'Steamers' on the lake of Ullswater in the English Lake District, where she has spent her entire working life. She was built in 1877 as a steam vessel but converted to diesel power in 1936. She is a member of the National Historic Fleet.

The Lady of the Lake has a length of 96.95 feet (29.55 m), a beam of 14.75 feet (4.50 m) and a draught of 2.39 feet (0.73 m). Her gross tonnage is 43, and she can carry 200 passengers.

== History ==
The M.Y. Lady of the Lake was ordered by the Ullswater Steam Navigation Company, a predecessor of the current owners, to a design by Douglas Henson of Penrith. She was built by T.B. Seath & Co. at Rutherglen near Glasgow, transported in three sections by rail to Penrith, and thence by horse drays to Waterside near Pooley Bridge. She was assembled on the slipway at Waterside and launched on 26 June 1877.

In 1881 the Lady of the Lake sank at her moorings but was re-floated by a team of divers. In 1936 she was converted from steam to diesel power. The vessel sank again in 1950 in a severe storm, but was again re-floated. In 1965 the vessel was badly damaged by fire and was out of service for 14 years, before being restored and reengined. She was re-launched on 19 May 1979 by William Whitelaw.

== Gallery ==
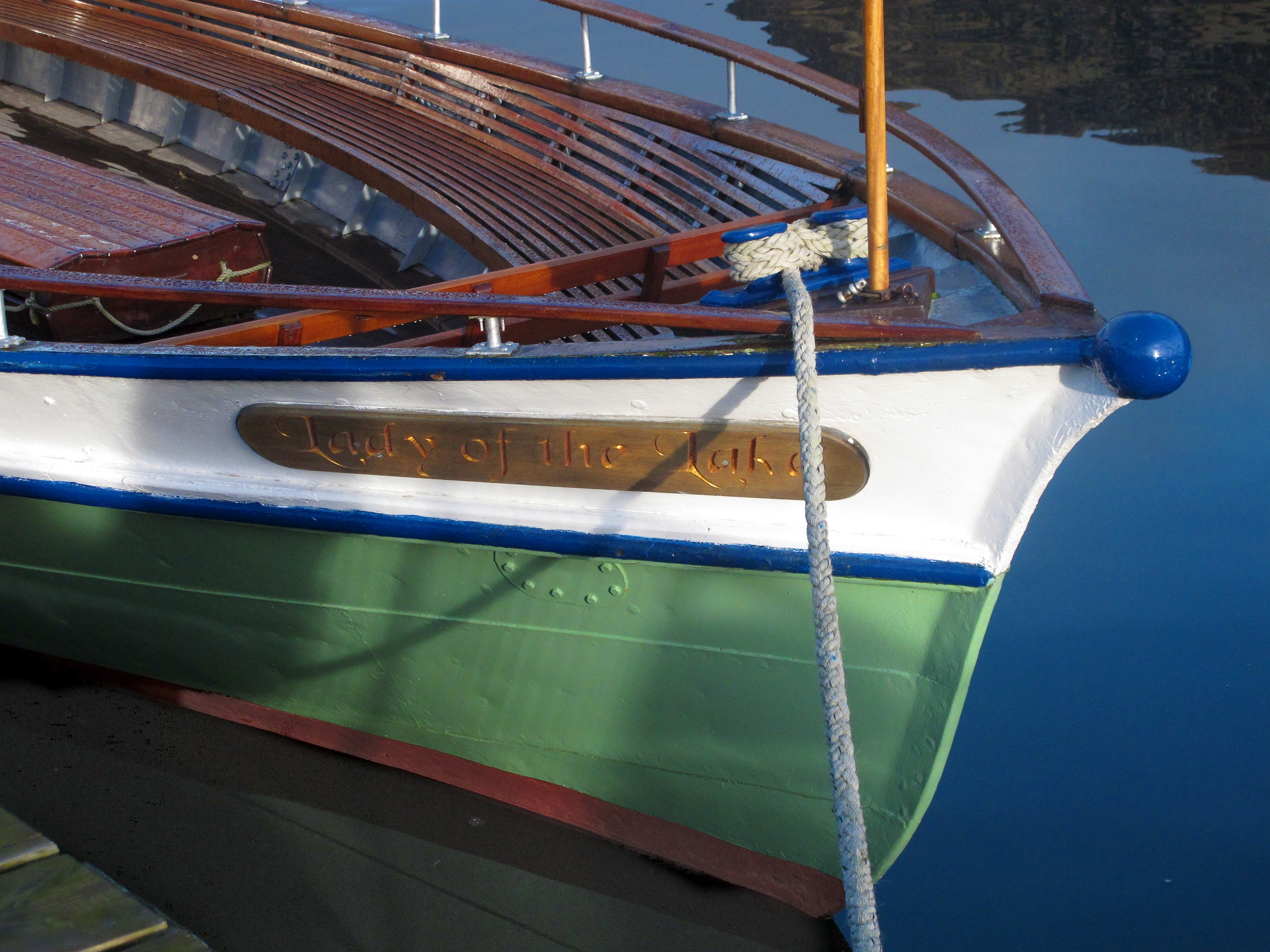
The bow of Lady of the Lake

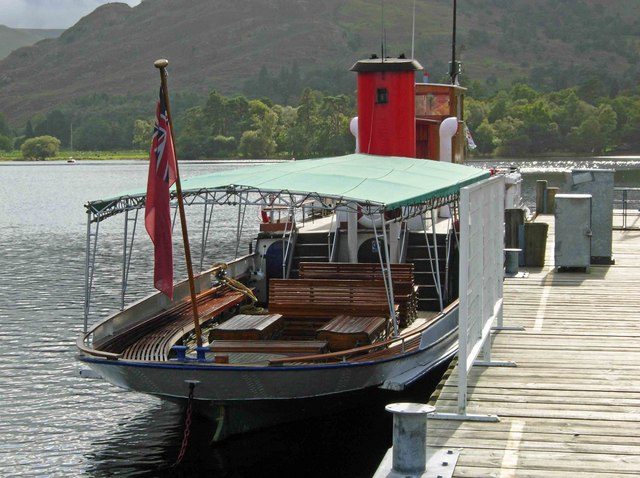
Lady of the Lake at Glenridding.

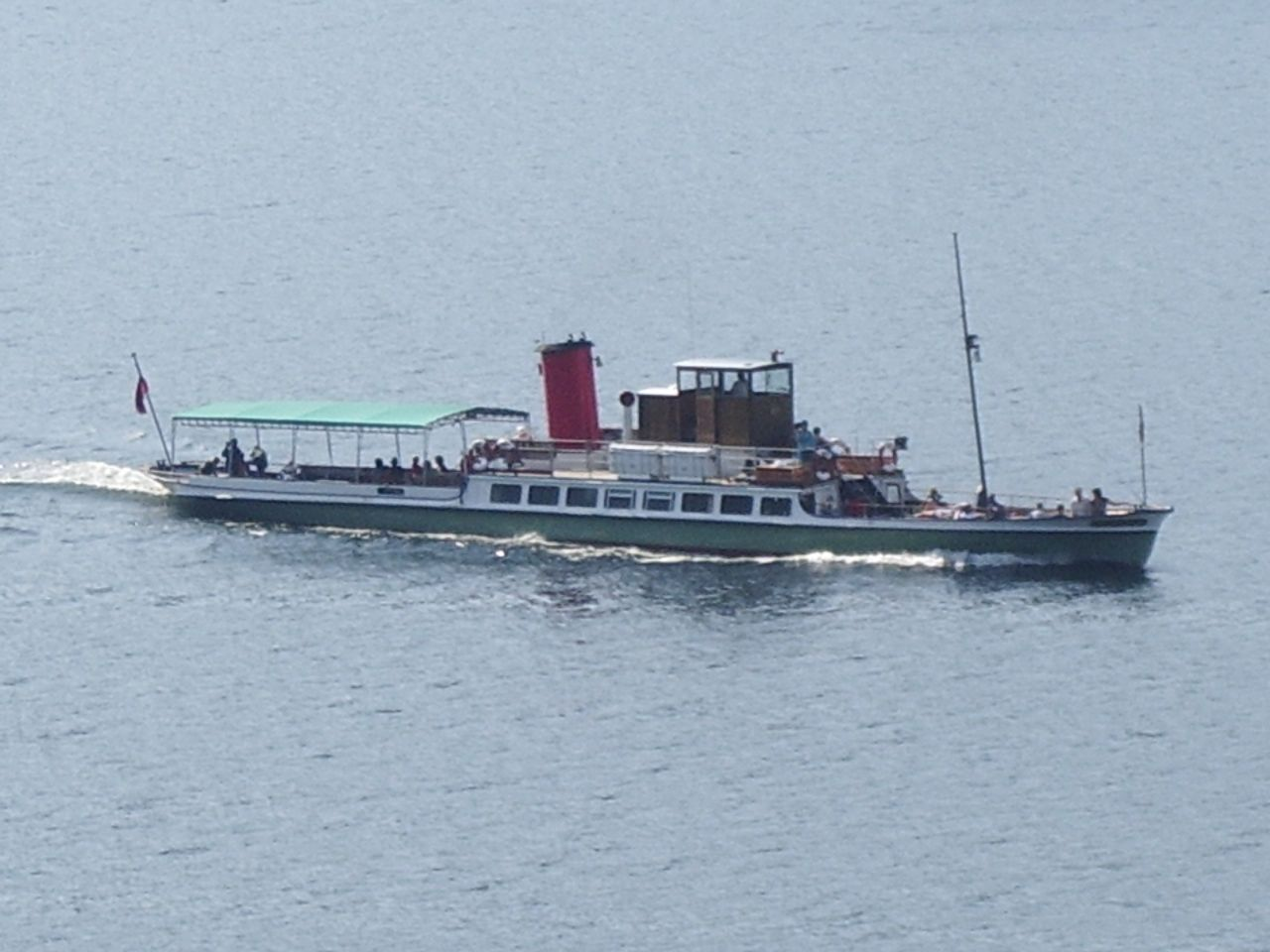
Lady of the Lake under way

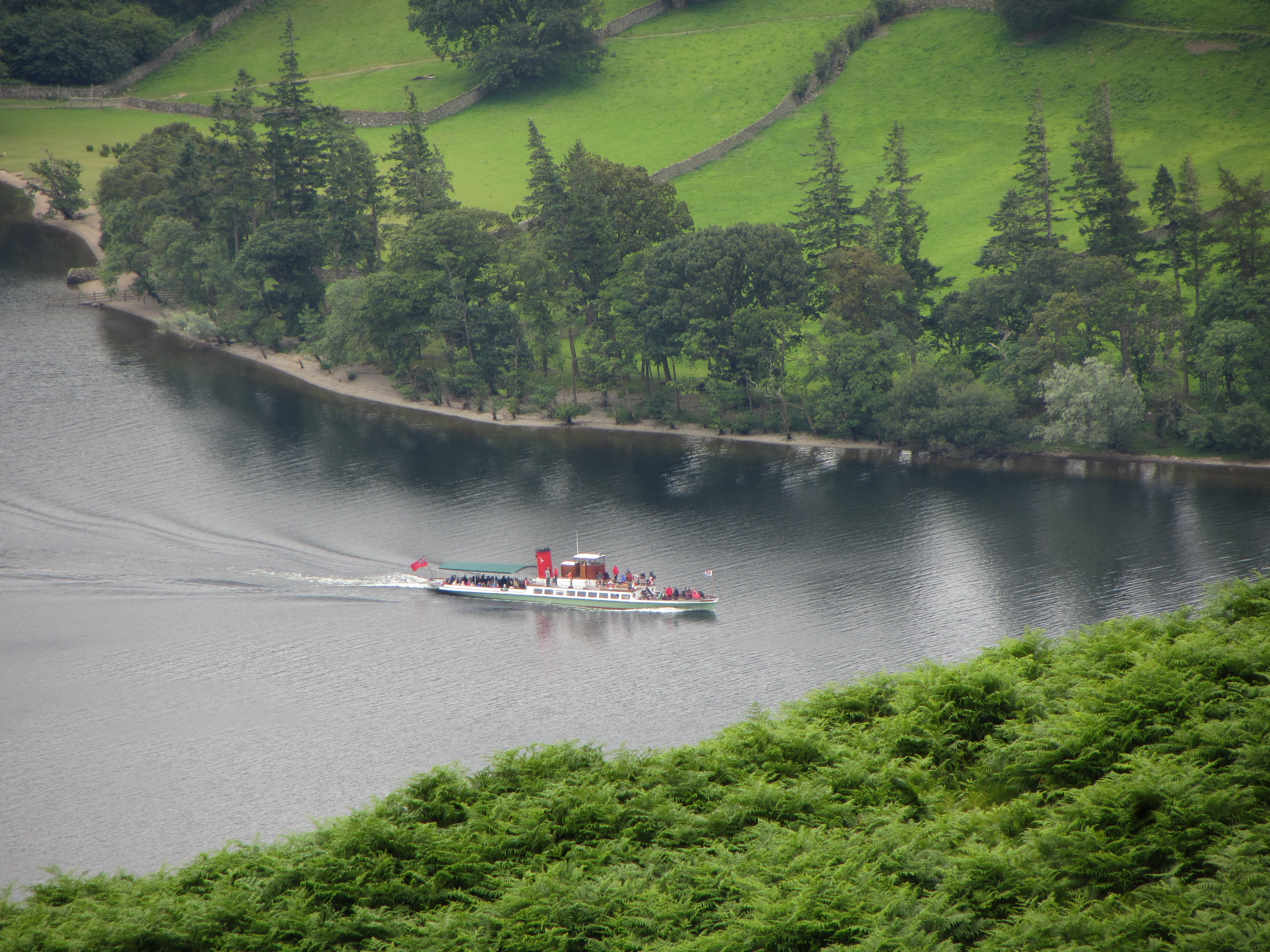
Lady of the Lake at home on her lake

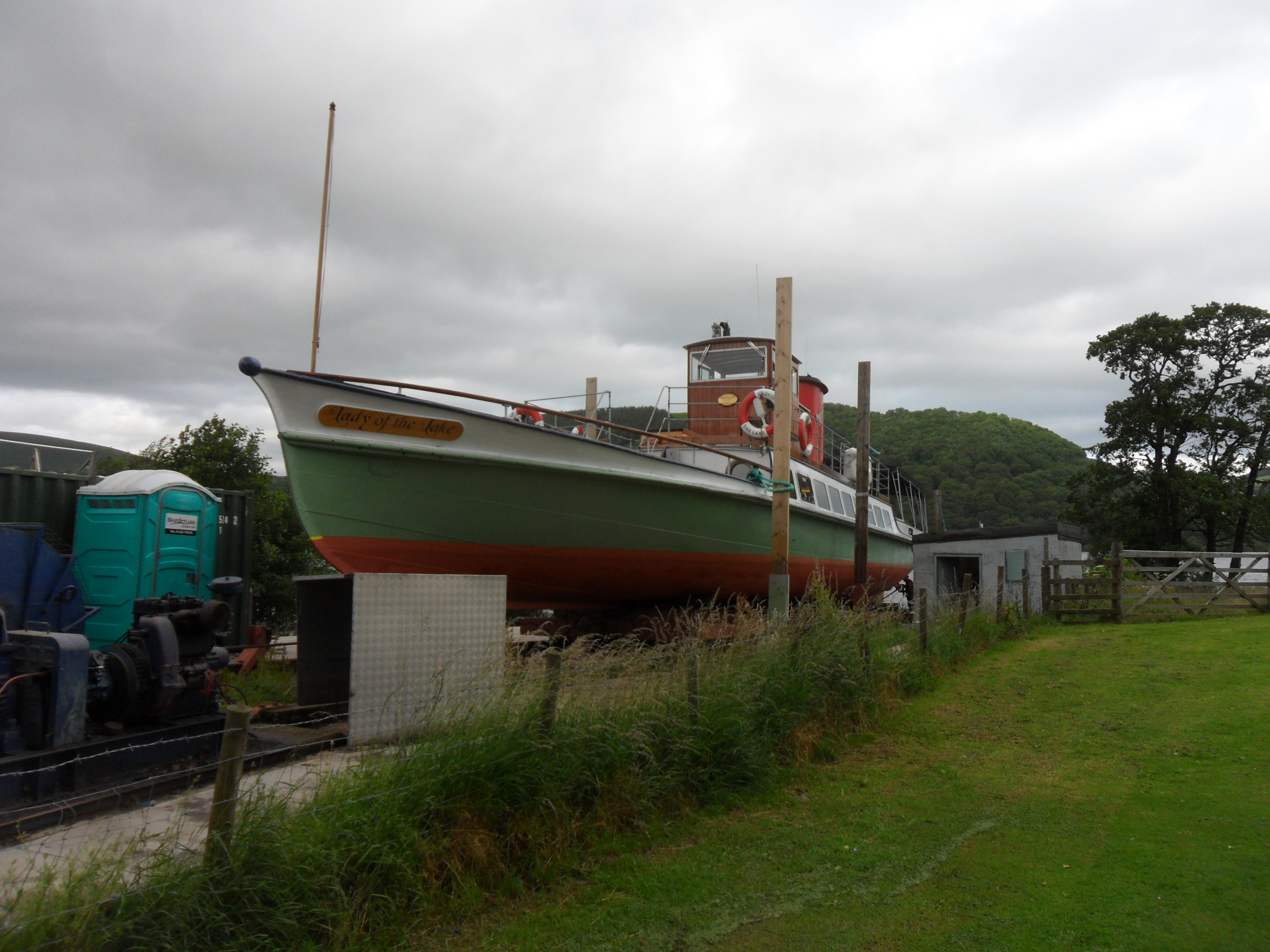
Lady of the Lake on the slip at Waterside
