= MV Western Belle =

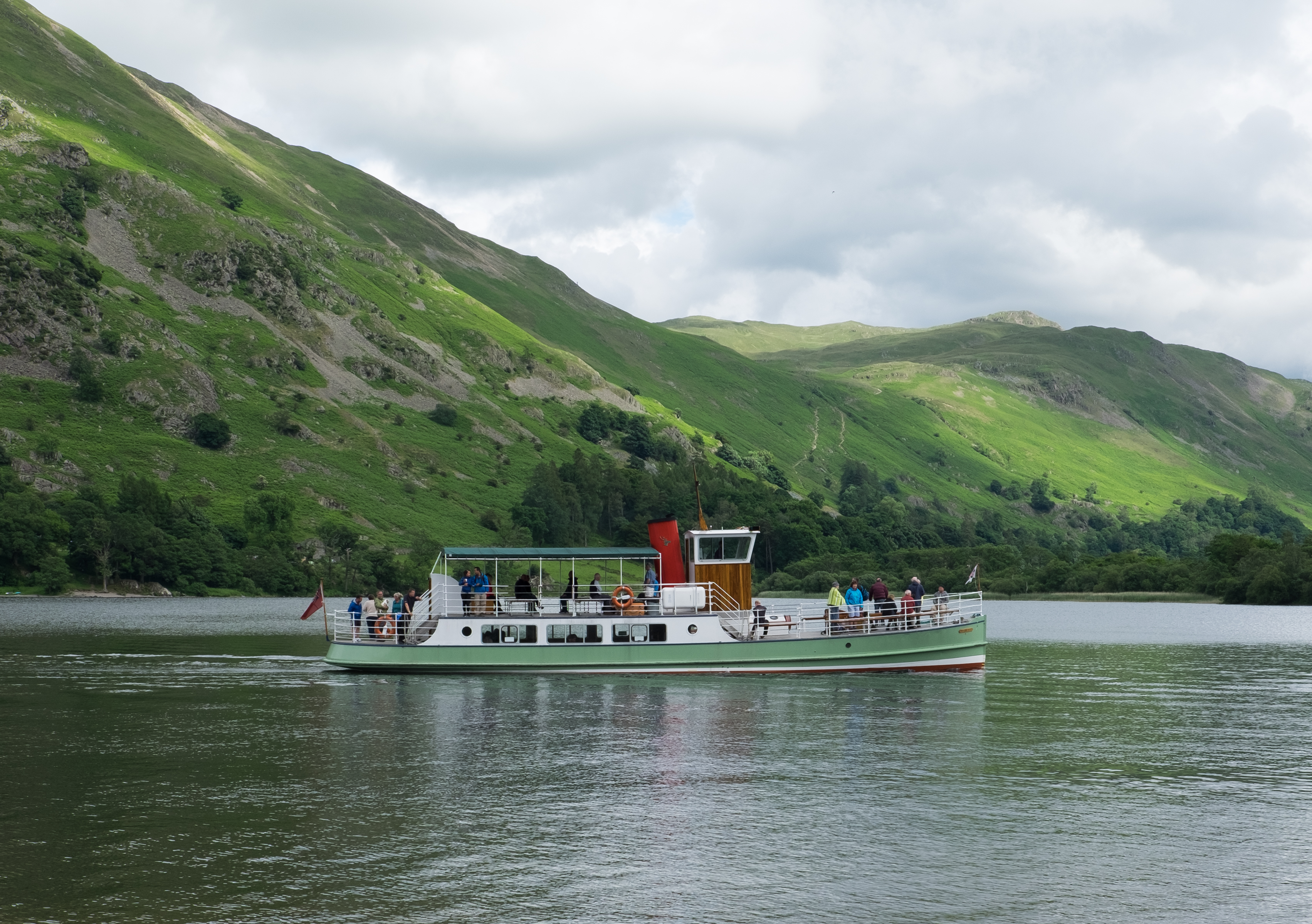
- Western Belle on Ullswater

History

United Kingdom
- Name: Western Belle
- Owner: Millbrook Steamboat & Trading Co Ltd (1935); Dart Pleasure Craft Ltd (1985); Chris Cruises (2000); Ullswater 'Steamers' (2008)
- Route: River Tamar (1935); River Dart (1985); River Thames (2000); Ullswater (2010)
- Builder: Fellows, Great Yarmouth
- Launched: 1935
- Sponsored by: Molly Thorne

General characteristics
- Type: Twin-screw motor vessel
- Tonnage: 56.24 GT
- Length: 69.9 ft (21.3 m) LOA
- Beam: 15.3 ft (4.7 m)
- Draught: 5.4 ft (1.6 m)
- Decks: 2
- Propulsion: Diesel
- Capacity: 147 passengers

MV Western Belle is a twin screw passenger vessel. She is owned by Ullswater 'Steamers', who refitted her and launched her on Ullswater in the autumn of 2010.

== History ==
The ship was built in 1935 by Fellows & Co of Great Yarmouth in East Anglia for Millbrook Steamboat & Trading Co Ltd. She was used principally on excursion services from Plymouth, and also on the Plymouth - Millbrook ferry. Her excursion routes were varied, covering the whole of the River Tamar, to the River Yealm, and coastal cruises as far as Looe in Cornwall. During the Second World War she continued to run the Millbrook ferry, and was very busy carrying people from the city to the countryside each night, to avoid the Blitz. In 1955 she was briefly chartered to British Railways for use on their Dartmouth - Kingswear Passenger Ferry; afterwards, she resumed service from Plymouth. In 1985 The Millbrook company, by this point owned by Dart Pleasure Craft Ltd of Dartmouth, abandoned its services in Plymouth, mainly due to competition with Plymouth Boat Cruises, and Western Belle was transferred to the River Dart. She operated on all of the 'River Link' services of Dart Pleasure craft, including Dartmouth-Totnes, the Dartmouth-Kingswear Ferry and circular cruises from Dartmouth.

In 2000 Dart Pleasure Craft took over G.H. Riddalls and Sons, their main competitor on River Dart services. With the increase in size of the fleet, Western Belle was surplus to requirements and she was sold to Chris Cruises of Hampton Court on the River Thames, where she was used for charters. In 2008, she was sold to Ullswater 'Steamers' and laid up at Maryport in Cumbria. She was transported to lake Ullswater in July 2010 to start service on the lake late 2010.

MV Totnes Castle was also bought by this operator. She was transported overland to Ullswater, and became Lady Wakefield in 2007.
