= T. B. Seath & Co. =

Clyde-based shipbuilding company

T.B. Seath & Co. was a shipbuilding company in Scotland established in 1856 by Thomas Bollen Seath (1820–1903) at a bend on the south bank of the River Clyde at Shawfield, Rutherglen; his previous premises near Partick were taken over by A. & J. Inglis. For a time he operated a service taking passengers downriver to central Glasgow. The company's speciality was small iron-hulled steamboats and yachts including those used in the Clutha ferry service.

The yard produced more than 300 vessels, some of which have survived and are in service into the 21st century. Builds include MY Raven, MY Lady of the Lake, PS Brighton, MV Nelcebee and PS Lune. The Seath business closed in 1902 after a tidal weir was installed on the river east of Albert Bridge, blocking access to the sea from Rutherglen. Other firms continued to use the yard until 1923. Seath is interred in a prominent tomb at the nearby Southern Necropolis.

== List of ships built by T.B. Seath & Co ==
Ships built by T.B. Seath
Launched	Ship's name at launch	Tonnage (GRT)	Notes
1877	MY Lady of the Lake	43	still in service on the lake of Ullswater in the English Lake District
1882	SS Mabel	28	beached at Loch Maree, 1913
1883	PS Brighton	417	hulked in 1916 in the Port Stephens estuary in New South Wales, Australia
1883	MV Nelcebee		on display at South Australian Maritime Museum
1888	PS Lucy Ashton	271.3	scrapped 1951
1889	MY Raven	63	still in service on the lake of Ullswater in the English Lake District
1892	PS Lune	253	scrapped 1923/4
