= Fellows & Co =

Shipbuilders in Norfolk, England

Fellows & Co were a shipbuilders based in Great Yarmouth in the English county of Norfolk. The yard was established by James Lovewell, who died in 1824. After his death it was acquired by the Fellows family. It was also owned by F T Everard & Sons Ltd, a coastal shipping company. The yard was acquired by Richards (Shipbuilders) Ltd of Lowestoft in 1970 but was closed in the late 1980s.

== Ships built ==
Ships built by Fellows & Co include:

- MV Coronia
- MV Western Belle 1935
- Will, formerly Will Everard, a Thames sailing barge, 1925
- River-class minesweepers 1980s, six including HMS Ribble, Carron
