= USS Western Belle =

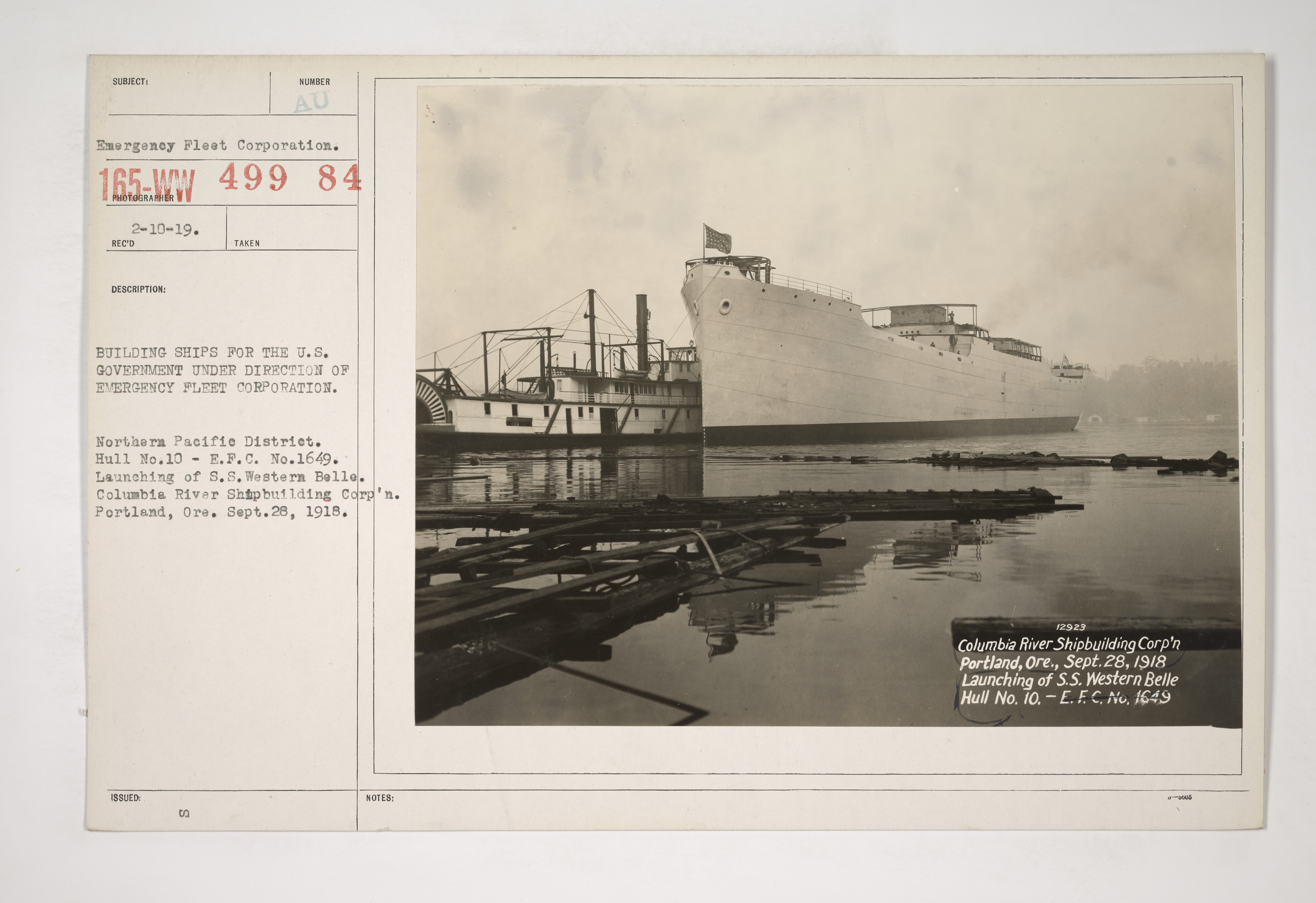
- Launching of USS Western Belle, September 28, 1918, Portland, Oregon

History

United States
- Name: USS Western Belle
- Namesake: Previous name retained
- Builder: Columbia River Shipbuilding Corporation, Portland, Oregon
- Launched: 28 September 1918
- Completed: 1918
- Acquired: 1918
- Commissioned: 22 November 1918
- Decommissioned: 3 May 1919
- Fate: Transferred to U.S. Shipping Board 3 May 1919
- Notes: In U.S. Shipping Board custody as SS Western Belle 1919-1932; Sold 1932; Abandoned 1933

General characteristics
- Type: Design 1013 cargo ship
- Tonnage: 5,689 Gross register tons
- Displacement: 12,100 long tons (12,294 t)
- Length: 423 ft 9 in (129.16 m)
- Beam: 54 ft 0 in (16.46 m)
- Draft: 24 ft 6 in (7.47 m) mean
- Depth of hold: 29 ft 9 in (9.07 m)
- Propulsion: Steam engine, one shaft
- Speed: 10.5 knots (19.4 km/h; 12.1 mph)
- Complement: 88
- Armament: None

USS Western Belle (ID-3551) was a United States Navy cargo ship in commission from 1918 to 1919.

== Construction, acquisition, and commissioning ==
Western Belle was constructed in 1918 as the commercial steel-hulled, single-screw cargo ship SS Western Belle for the United States Shipping Board by the Columbia River Shipbuilding Corporation at Portland, Oregon. The Shipping Board transferred her to the U.S. Navy, and the Navy assigned her the naval registry identification number 3551 and commissioned her on 22 November 1918 at the Puget Sound Navy Yard at Bremerton, Washington, as USS Western Belle (ID-3551).

== Operational history ==
Assigned to the Naval Overseas Transportation Service, Western Belle departed the Puget Sound Navy Yard on 22 December 1918 with a cargo of 6,818 tons of flour. Proceeding via the Panama Canal, she arrived at New York City on 7 January 1919 and bunkered with coal before departing for Gibraltar on 18 January 1919. She arrived at Gibraltar on 3 February 1919 and awaited further orders.

Notes from the Log of Bosun Donald Chandler Thompson, who shipped on the Western Belle in 1918: "Dec. 3 1918 - Left Albers Dock #3 at 6:20 a.m..." Dec. 7 - "Lights of San Francisco glowing on the horizon off port beam at nine oclock." Dec. 9 - "Perfect weather -beginning to get hot. Passed San Diego about 10 p.m." Dec. 12 - "Warm breeze with bright sunlight today. Moonlight tonight. Off Magdalena Bay.". Dec. 17 - "Full moon. Am south of the moon for the first time." Dec. 19 - "Many volcanoes in sight. Off Gautamaulan [sic] coast & pulling offshore all the time." Dec. 23 - "Reached Balboa at 3:47 today." Dec.24 - "Left Balboa at 6 a.m... Fine trip through Canal - took some pictures. Tied up at coal dock in Cristobel at 4:05 p.m." Dec. 26 - "Pulled up to dock at 9 a.m. to load freight and stores. Left for sea at 5:00 p.m. and are now in tropical rain storm in Carribean [sic] Sea at 7:00 p.m." Dec. 31 - "Passed Cuba at 4 p.m. today." Jan 2 1919 - "Knocking along off the southern coast of Florida. Passed Miama [sic]." Jan. 5 - "Passed Cape H. [Hatteras] sometime today." Jan. 6 - "Passed Atlantic City about noon. Made Long Island Sound about eight oclock. Stood by to take pilot aboard." Jan. 7 - "Anchored at 9:40 a.m. about two miles below Statue of Liberty. Stayed all day & night." Jan. 8 - "Up anchor at 6:30 a.m. & went up to dock. Docket at 11:30 a.m. Pier 46 Hudson R."

[From family records, posted by Jeri-Lynn Woods, Donald Thompson's granddaughter].

Directed to proceed to Deringe, France, Western Belle got underway from Gibraltar on 8 February 1919. After off-loading her cargo of flour at Deringe, she loaded 924 tons of United States Army cargo and departed Deringe on 20 March 1919 bound for New York City. She arrived at New York on 20 April 1919.

== Decommissioning and disposal ==
Western Belle was decommissioned on 3 May 1919, and the Navy transferred her back to the U.S. Shipping Board the same day. Once again SS Western Belle, she remained in the custody of the Shipping Board until 1932, when Merritt, Chapman, and Scott purchased her. She was abandoned in 1933.
