= Listed buildings in Barton and Pooley Bridge =

Barton and Pooley Bridge is a civil parish in Westmorland and Furness, Cumbria, England. Before 1 April 2019 the parish was named Barton. It contains 37 buildings that are recorded in the National Heritage List for England. Of these, one is listed at Grade I, the highest of the three grades, two are at Grade II*, the middle grade, and the others are at Grade II, the lowest grade. The parish is in the Lake District National Park. It is mainly rural, it contains the village of Pooley Bridge, the hamlet of Barton and smaller settlements, and part of it extends along the east shore of Ullswater. Most of the listed buildings are houses, farmhouses and farm buildings. The other listed buildings include a church and structures in the churchyard, three boundary posts, and a limekiln.

== Key ==
Grade	Criteria
I	Buildings of exceptional interest, sometimes considered to be internationally important
II*	Particularly important buildings of more than special interest
II	Buildings of national importance and special interest

== Buildings ==
Name and location	Photograph	Date	Notes	Grade
St Michael's Church; 54.62981°N 2.79534°W		12th century	The oldest part of the church is the tower and the nave, and there have been repeated alterations and extensions over the following centuries. The church is in stone, and has slate roofs with coped gables. It consists of a nave, aisles with a south porch and chapels, a chancel with a vestry, and a tower over the crossing. The tower, the north and south doors, and the arcades are Norman in style, and the chapels and most of the windows are Perpendicular.	I
Barton Church Farmhouse; 54.63039°N 2.79898°W	—	16th century	The oldest part is the west wing, the north wing was added in 1628, and the porch in 1693. The farmhouse is roughcast with a slate roof, and has mullioned windows, two storeys with attics, and an L-shaped plan. The north wing has four bays, and contains a porch and an inner doorway with triangular heads. On the porch is an inscribed and dated panel. The west wing has three bays, the third bay projecting as a stair bay. Some windows contain casements, and one window is transomed.	II*
Kirkbarrow; 54.62814°N 2.79113°W	—	Late 16th or early 17th century	A stone house that has a slate roof with coped gables. It has an L-shaped plan and a rear wing, two storeys, and a front of four bays. In the third bay is a two-storey porch that has a doorway with a sunk triangular head over which is a hood mould and a panel containing a coat of arms. Above this is two-light mullioned window with a chamfered surround. In the gable is the corbelled statue of a nun, and on the apex is a spike finial. The other windows on the front are casements with hood moulds, and elsewhere there are sash windows, some of them horizontally-sliding. Inside the house are four upper cruck trusses.	II
Glebe Farmhouse; 54.63004°N 2.79765°W		1637	Originating as a rectory, it is in roughcast stone with a slate roof. There are two storeys and four bays, with a two-storey porch and a lean-to outshut. The windows on the front are mullioned with chamfered surrounds, those in the lower floor having hood moulds, and there is a fire window. The doorway has an architrave and a triangular head, above which is an inscribed and dated panel. Elsewhere the windows vary; some are horizontally-sliding sashes, and other are casements.	II*
Farm buildings, Barton Church Farm; 54.63025°N 2.79825°W	—	17th century (probable)	The buildings are in stone with slate roofs, and form an L-shaped plan with two wings that are attached to the farmhouse. The features include two inscribed and dated keystones, windows, some of which are mullioned with chamfered surrounds, pitching holes, segmental-arched entrances, ventilation slits, and a panel with a coat of arms.	II
Roehead and outbuildings 54.60533°N 2.80769°W	—	17th century	The house and outbuildings are in stone and are partly roughcast. The house has two storeys and seven bays, the right four bays being canted back, and at the rear is a gabled wing. The windows vary; some are mullioned, and some contain horizontally-sliding sashes. The main doorway has a Tudor arched head and a hood mould, and there is another entrance with a stone surround, originally a stable door. The outbuilding to the south has three entrances, one with a segmental-arched head, and the outbuilding to the north has a barn entrance.	II
Seat Farmhouse, cottage and barn 54.59291°N 2.83421°W	—	1662	This consists of a house with an adjoining cottage, and a barn at right angles linked to the cottage by a canted outbuilding. The buildings are in stone with slate roofs. The house and cottage have two storeys, the house has two bays, and the cottage has two. Above the entrance to the house is an initialled and dated keystone. Other than one casement window, the windows are sashes. The cottage has a large entrance with a cambered timber lintel and casement windows. The outbuilding has an elliptical-headed opening. In the barn is an initialled and dated keystone, entrances, windows, and ventilation slits.	II
Cross Dormont Farmhouse and barn 54.59463°N 2.83433°W	—	1682	The farmhouse and barn are in stone with slate roofs. The house has two storeys and an L-shaped plan. Some of the windows are sashes, and others are mullioned. The doorway has a dated lintel. In the barn are segmental-headed entrances, doors, and ventilation slits.	II
Waterside House; 54.59949°N 2.83322°W	—	1694	A stone house with a slate roof and a slate-hung south gable wall. It has two storeys and three bays, with a projecting privy in the first bay, and outshuts at the rear. The windows are mixed, some are casements, some are mullioned, and some are sashes. The doorway has a moulded architrave, and a decorated, initialled and dated lintel.	II
Celleron Cottage; 54.61977°N 2.78279°W	—	Late 17th or early 18th century (probable)	The cottage is in stone, partly roughcast, with a slate roof, two storeys and four bays. The windows are casements in various surrounds, and there is a fire window. At the rear is an outshut.	II
Moorend Farmhouse and outbuildings 54.62088°N 2.80863°W	—	Late 17th or early 18th century	The farmhouse and outbuilding are in stone with slate roofs. The house is rendered, with two storeys and four bays. The windows are square with chamfered surrounds and contain casements. At the rear is an outshut, a stair bay, and a sash window. The outbuilding has a segmental-headed barn entrance, other entrances and windows, and a pitching hole.	II
Winder Hall Cottage and barn 54.61420°N 2.78867°W	—	Late 17th or early 18th century (probable)	The house and barn are in stone with slate roofs. The house has two storeys, three bays, and a west outshut. The windows have chamfered surrounds, some are horizontally-sliding sashes, and others are casements. The barn to the north has various openings, some blocked, including casement windows, ventilation slits, and an owl hole.	II
Barton Hall; 54.61826°N 2.80985°W	—	1712	A country house that was extended in 1863. It is in stone, with two storeys and attics, and the extension is roughcast with sandstone dressings. The original part has a front of five bays, a chamfered plinth, rusticated quoins, a string course, a cornice, and coped gables. The windows are mullioned with architraves, and some contain sashes. The entrance has a bolection moulded architrave and a dated open pediment, and on the front are two gabled dormers. The extension forms a cross-wing, it has three bays, and contains two two-storey bay windows. At the rear is a single-storey service wing and stables.	II
Winder Hall; 54.61324°N 2.78858°W	—	1712	A stone farmhouse with a slate roof, which has been partly converted into a farm building. It has two storeys and an L-shaped plan, with two ranges, a small single-storey gabled wing, a staircase wing, and a conservatory. The windows are mullioned. The northeast range has four bays, and the windows contain horizontally-sliding sashes. The doorway has a triangular head, a dated lintel, and a hood mould with head stops. The southwest range has three bays, and contains a corbelled gabled oriel window. In the wing there are dove holes.	II
High Brow; 54.62125°N 2.79136°W	—	Early 18th century (probable)	A stone house with a slate roof, it is in two storeys and five bays. The windows are mullioned, there is a fire window, and the doorway has an architrave, a frieze and a cornice. At the rear is an outshut, and the later additions include a garage and a sun lounge.	II
Low Brown Farmhouse; 54.62116°N 2.79619°W	—	Early 18th century (probable)	The farmhouse was extended in the 19th century. It is in stone with a slate roof, and has two storeys and seven bays. The windows in the second to fifth bays are mullioned, in the first bay are casement windows, and the windows in the sixth and seventh bays are sashes. At the rear are two outshuts, and an entrance that has a chamfered lintel with an inscribed escutcheon.	II
Mains Farmhouse; 54.61382°N 2.81309°W	—	Early to mid 18th century (probable)	A roughcast farmhouse that has a roof of slate and stone-slate with coped gables. There are two storeys with attics, a front of three bays, a lean-to extension on the right, and a gabled rear wing with a two-storey outshut. There is a central doorway, and the windows are mullioned with sashes.	II
Barn, Elderbeck; 54.60549°N 2.81800°W	—	18th century	The barn, which includes some earlier material including an inscribed and dated lintel, is in stone with a slate roof. In the south front are a blocked segmental-headed entrance, ventilation slits, and inserted windows. On the north side external steps lead up to a first floor doorway, and the front contains other openings.	II
Barn, Mains Farm; 54.61403°N 2.81315°W	—	18th century (probable)	The barn is in stone with a slate roof, and contains openings, one with an elliptical-arched head, and there are ventilation slits. To the north is a gin gang dating from the early 19th century, with a rounded end, and piers supporting the roof.	II
Farm building, Mains Farm; 54.61367°N 2.81338°W	—	18th century (probable)	The farm building is in stone with a slate roof, and has two storeys, and a rear wing and outshut. There are four entrances, one with an elliptical arch, and in the upper floor are three loading doors and a granary door. At the east end is a two-light mullioned window.	II
Todd Monument; 54.62968°N 2.79544°W	—	18th century (probable)	The monument is in the churchyard of St Michael's Church, and consists of an ashlar headstone. It has a raised panel, and a swan-neck pediment decorated with foliage and shell. There are inscriptions on the front and on the rear.	II
Sisson Monument; 54.62964°N 2.79551°W	—	1758	The monument is in the churchyard of St Michael's Church, and consists of an ashlar headstone. It has an open pediment and flat pilasters. The headstone is inscribed with the name of one person.	II
Suder Monument; 54.62962°N 2.79533°W	—	1759	The monument is in the churchyard of St Michael's Church, and consists of an ashlar chest tomb. It is plain, with a simple moulded edge to the top. On the tomb is a copper plate inscribed with one name.	II
Walker Monument; 54.62970°N 2.79560°W	—	1762	The monument is in the churchyard of St Michael's Church, and consists of a table tomb. There are two slabs with square balusters supporting a slab with a simple moulded edge containing an inscription.	II
Elderbeck and Cottage; 54.60517°N 2.81770°W		Mid to late 18th century (probable)	A pair of roughcast stone houses that have slate roofs with coped gables. There are two storeys and four bays, with flanking single-storey bays, and at the rear are outshuts. The doorway has a stone surround and a cornice. The windows are sashes, and in the outer bays are blind Venetian windows, one with an inserted casement.	II
Nicholson Monument; 54.62975°N 2.79524°W	—	1773	The monument is in the churchyard of St Michael's Church, and consists of an ashlar headstone. It is plain with a segmental head, and carries an inscription.	II
Nicholson Monument; 54.62975°N 2.79522°W	—	1775	The monument is in the churchyard of St Michael's Church, and consists of an ashlar headstone. It has a panel with simple moulding and a swan-necked open pediment decorated with shell and foliage.	II
Bewsher Monument; 54.62973°N 2.79522°W	—	1788	The monument is in the churchyard of St Michael's Church, and consists of an ashlar headstone. It has a shaped top and an architrave, and records the details of two members of the Bewsher family.	II
Speight Monument; 54.62966°N 2.79514°W	—	1789	The monument is in the churchyard of St Michael's Church, and consists of an ashlar headstone. It has a swan-neck pediment and a round-headed copper plate inscribed with the names of two members of the Speight family who died in the same year.	II
Rowan Monument; 54.62966°N 2.79552°W	—	1790s	The monument is in the churchyard of St Michael's Church, and consists of a headstone. It has a rounded top and an architrave, and contains a copper plate in an oval panel with details of Edmund and Elizabeth Rowan.	II
Todd Monument; 54.62979°N 2.79516°W	—	1827	The monument is in the churchyard of St Michael's Church, and consists of a sandstone headstone with a rounded top. It is carved with cherub's heads with rays, and swags with scrolling curves.	II
Boundary post 54.61954°N 2.78396°W	—	1846	The boundary post is in cast iron, it has a triangular plan and a chamfered front. The post has a cornice, a plain cap containing the date, and there are two inscribed plates.	II
Boundary post 54.58171°N 2.85212°W	—	1847	The boundary post is in cast iron and is set into a stone wall. It has a triangular plan and a chamfered front, a cornice, a pyramidal cap, and two inscribed plates.	II
Boundary post 54.62516°N 2.78033°W	—	1847	The boundary post is in cast iron and has a triangular plan and a chamfered front. There is a cornice, a plain cap, and two inscribed plates.	II
Limekiln; 54.61421°N 2.78786°W	—	19th century (probable)	The limekiln is in stone. It has a rectangular plan, a wall extending to the south, and a segmental-arched fire hole.	II
Glasson Monument; 54.62995°N 2.79508°W	—	1935	The monument is in the churchyard of St Michael's Church, and consists of an ashlar headstone. It is convex with angle pilasters supporting kneeling, praying cherubs. The headstone is inscribed with a quotation and the names of two members of the Glasson family.	II
Mounting block 54.62989°N 2.79521°W	—	Uncertain	The mounting block is in the angle between the chancel and the vestry on the north side of St Michael's Church. It is in stone with a rectangular plan, and has four steps on the north side.	II
