= Arthur's Pike =

Fell in the Lake District, Cumbria, England

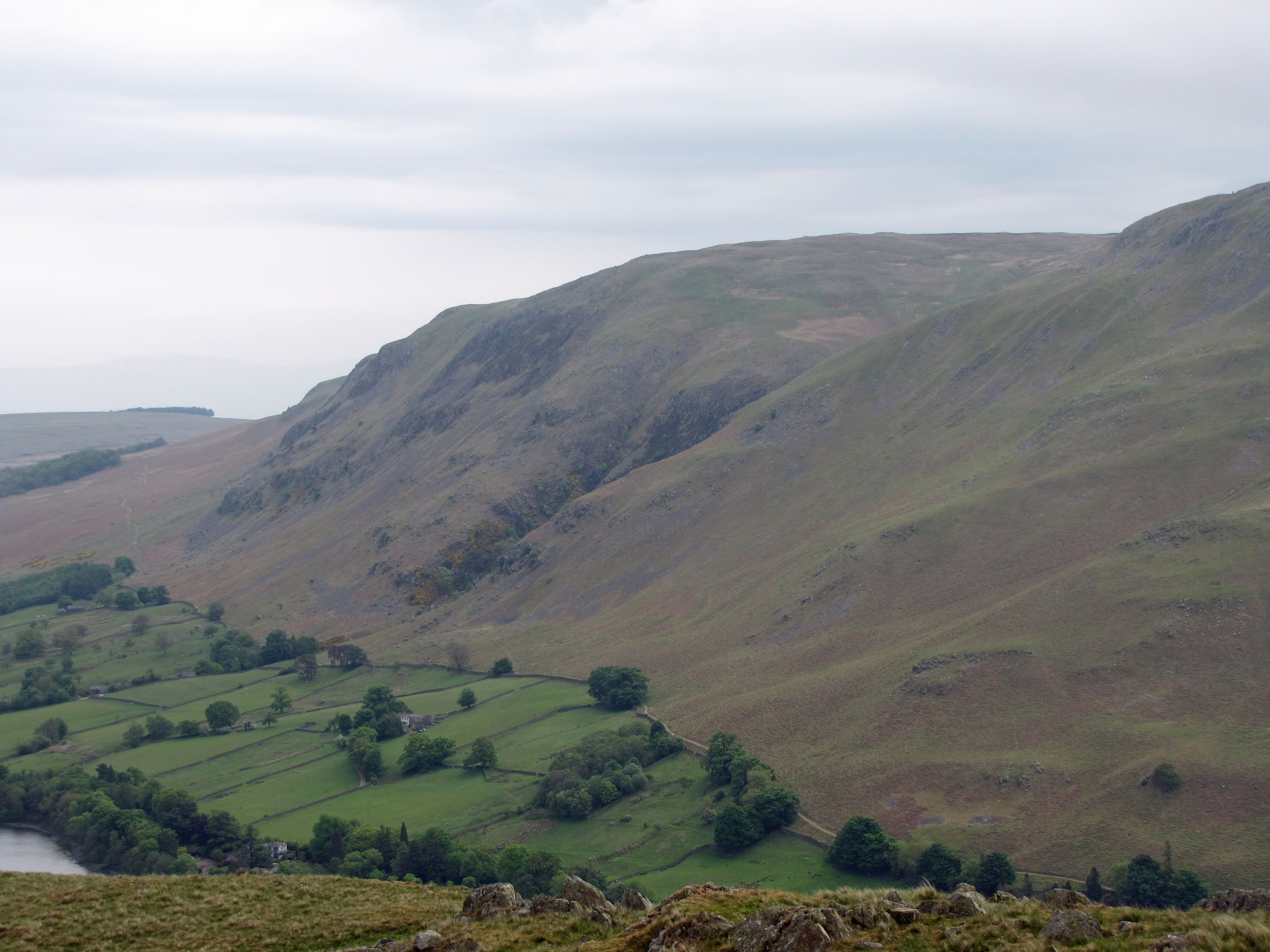
- Seen from Hallin Fell, three km to the SW.

Highest point
- Elevation: 533 m (1,749 ft)
- Prominence: < 10 metres (33 ft)
- Parent peak: Loadpot Hill
- Listing: Wainwright
- Coordinates: 54°34′40″N 2°50′07″W

Geography
- Location within the Lake District
- Location: Cumbria, England
- Parent range: Lake District, Far Eastern Fells
- OS grid: NY461206

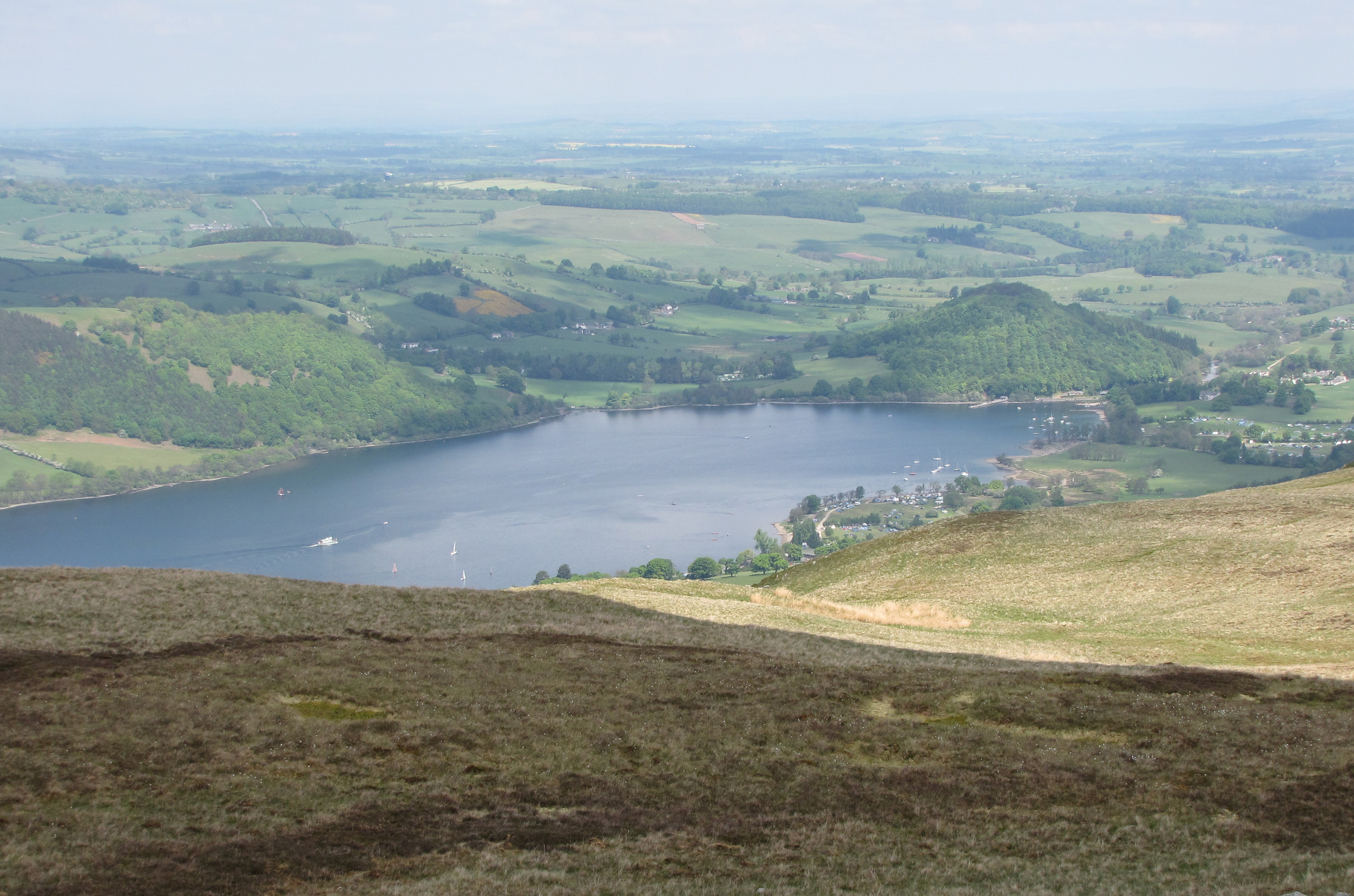
The view north from the summit takes in the northern end of Ullswater and Pooley Bridge.

Arthur's Pike is a fell in the English Lake District, near Ullswater. It is a subsidiary top on the ridge falling north from Loadpot Hill in the Far Eastern Fells. An extensive craggy face stands above the lower reach of Ullswater.

== Topography ==
The fell is separated from Loadpot Hill by a broad depression just south east of the summit, the ground here being quite marshy. The descending ridge turns north east at Arthur's Pike, passing over the knoll of White Knott as it falls between Aik Beck and the lake, heading for Pooley Bridge. Wainwright chose to define the fell between these narrow limits, assigning the wider slopes around Moor Divock to Loadpot Hill, and that convention is followed here.

To the west of Arthur's Pike the land falls steeply to Swarthbeck. This stream divides the fell from its twin, Bonscale Pike, before flowing to Ullswater. The north western face of Arthur's Pike has several tiers of crag, dropping to a belt of cultivated land and then the lakeside road to Howtown.

== Summit ==
Arthur's Pike has a small summit set back from the crags on a grassy plateau. The remains of a beacon (columnar cairn) mark the brink of the face.

== Ascents ==
There is no clear path to the summit, but a little to the south east the High Street Roman road runs past. The obvious direct ascent is from Swarthbeck on the Howtown road, outflanking the crags to the north and making for White Knott on a good path. The top can also be reached from the Roman road, either northwards from Loadpot Hill or southwards from Pooley Bridge or Helton.
