= High Raise =

High Raise, may refer to a number of hills in England:

- High Raise (High Street) – 802 m peak in the east of the Lake District
- High Raise (Langdale) – 762 m peak in the centre of the Lake District
