= Barton, Cumbria =

Hamlet in Cumbria, England

Coordinates: 54.63°N 2.80°W

Barton
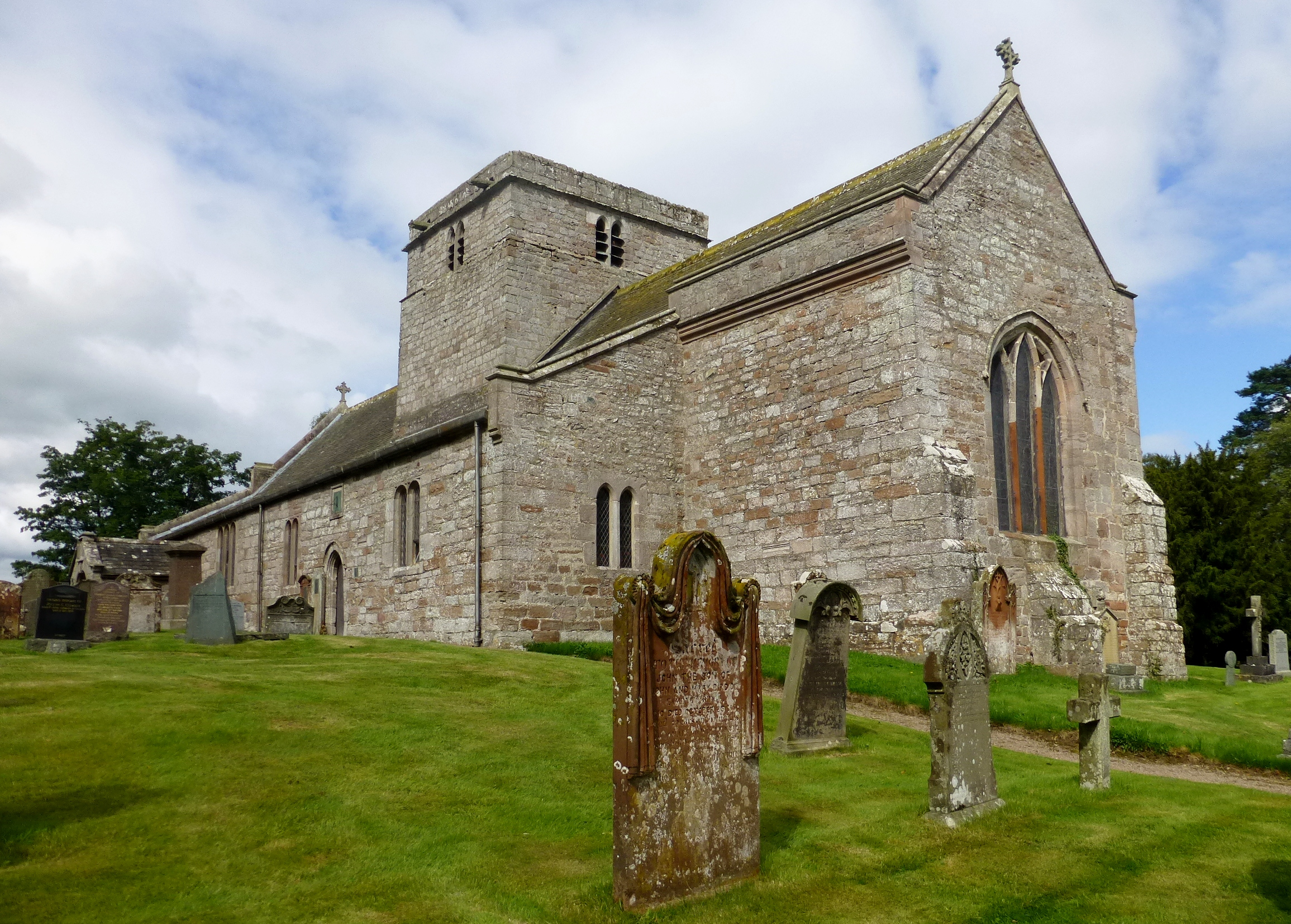
- St Michael's Church

- Location in Eden, Cumbria Location within Cumbria
- OS grid reference: NY486264
- Civil parish: Barton and Pooley Bridge
- Unitary authority: Westmorland and Furness
- Ceremonial county: Cumbria
- Region: North West
- Country: England
- Sovereign state: United Kingdom
- Post town: PENRITH
- Postcode district: CA10
- Dialling code: 01768
- Police: Cumbria
- Fire: Cumbria
- Ambulance: North West
- UK Parliament: Westmorland and Lonsdale

Barton is a hamlet in the civil parish of Barton and Pooley Bridge, in Westmorland and Furness, Cumbria, England. It lies about 3 kilometres (1.9 mi) to the north east of Pooley Bridge, east of the River Eamont and west of the B5320 road from Pooley Bridge to Eamont Bridge. The parish, which includes Barton and the larger settlement of Pooley Bridge, was renamed from "Barton" to "Barton and Pooley Bridge" on 1 April 2019, and had a population of 238 at the 2011 Census.

== Toponymy ==
Whaley suggests that 'Barton' is 'the barley farm or outlying grange', from Old English 'beretūn' or, more probably, 'bærtūn', which was used of farms, especially outliers of large estates, used for storing crops."

== Buildings ==
St Michael's Church is a grade I listed building; Glebe Farmhouse and Barton Church Farmhouse are grade II* listed, with a range of farm buildings attached to Barton Church Farmhouse listed at grade II. Several monuments in the church yard are individually listed at grade II.

== See also ==
- Listed buildings in Barton and Pooley Bridge
