= Pooley Bridge (structure) =

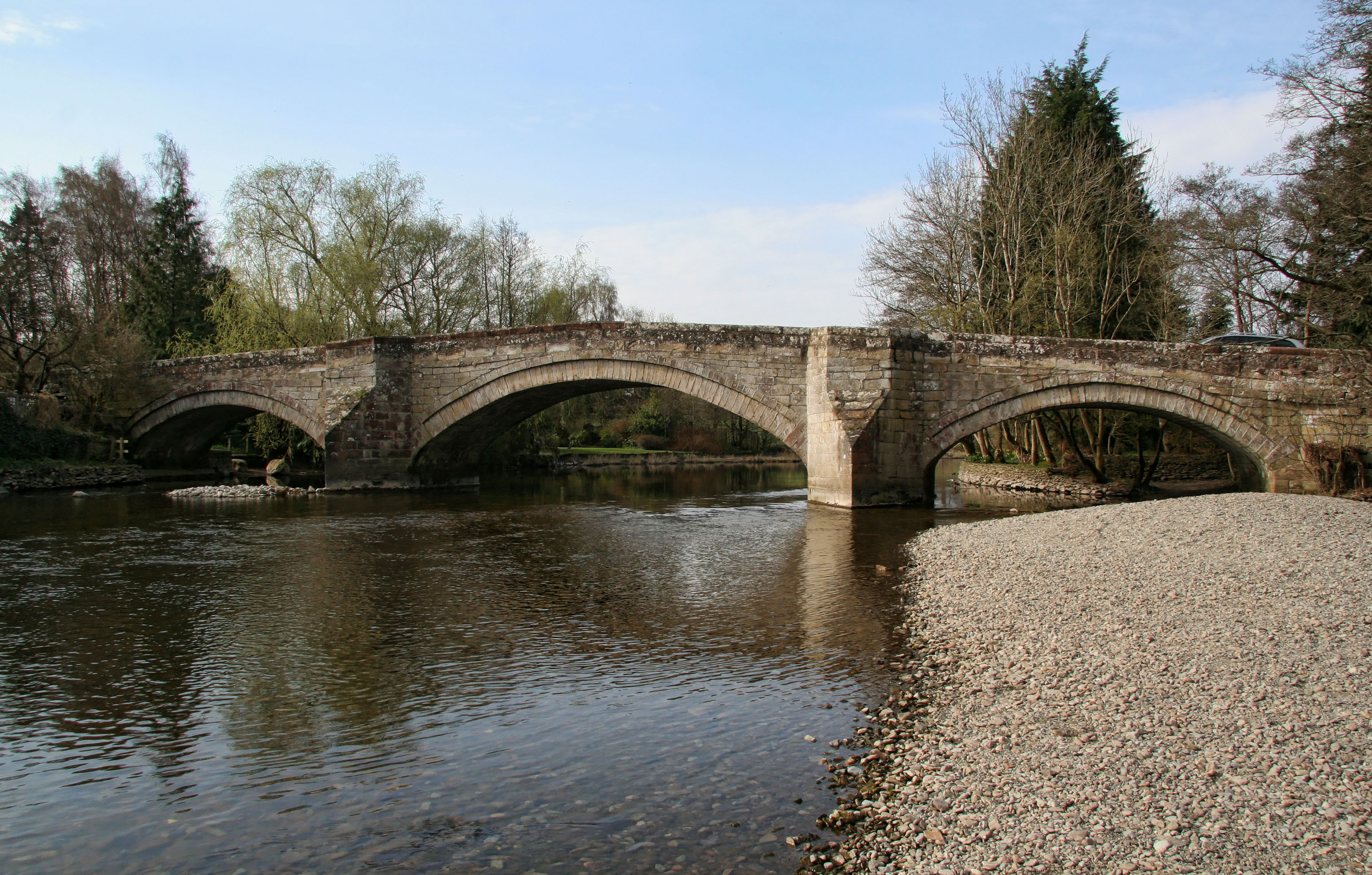
- The bridge in April 2006
- Coordinates: 54.612238°N 2.822185°W
- Locale: Pooley Bridge, Cumbria, England
- Heritage status: Grade II listed
- National Heritage List for England: 1145267

Characteristics
- Material: Red and calciferous sandstone
- No. of spans: 3

History
- Collapsed: 6 December 2015

Location
- Interactive map of Pooley Bridge

Pooley Bridge was an historic stone road bridge that crossed the River Eamont in the village of Pooley Bridge near the northern end of Ullswater. It connected two civil parishes, Barton and Pooley Bridge and Dacre, and was grade II listed in January 1991. A parapet stone was inscribed "JS & IR 1764".

The bridge, erected in 1764 and replacing an earlier bridge from the 16th century, was washed away on 6 December 2015 when Cumbria was hit by heavy flooding during Storm Desmond, after storm waters eroded the riverbed around the base of the bridge supports.

== New bridge ==
New bridge

A temporary replacement footbridge was opened on 20 March 2016, and a new stainless steel clear span road bridge was lifted into place in January 2020. It was opened to the public in October 2020, with some detailing still to be finished.

While a clear span bridge would normally have deep pile foundations on the banks, rock was not found even 15 m deep, so the new bridge was built as a tied arch bridge with the arch above the deck, designed with the slimmest profile possible without obstructing the view.
