= Barton and Pooley Bridge =

Civil parish in Cumbria, England

Coordinates: 54.604°N 2.807°W

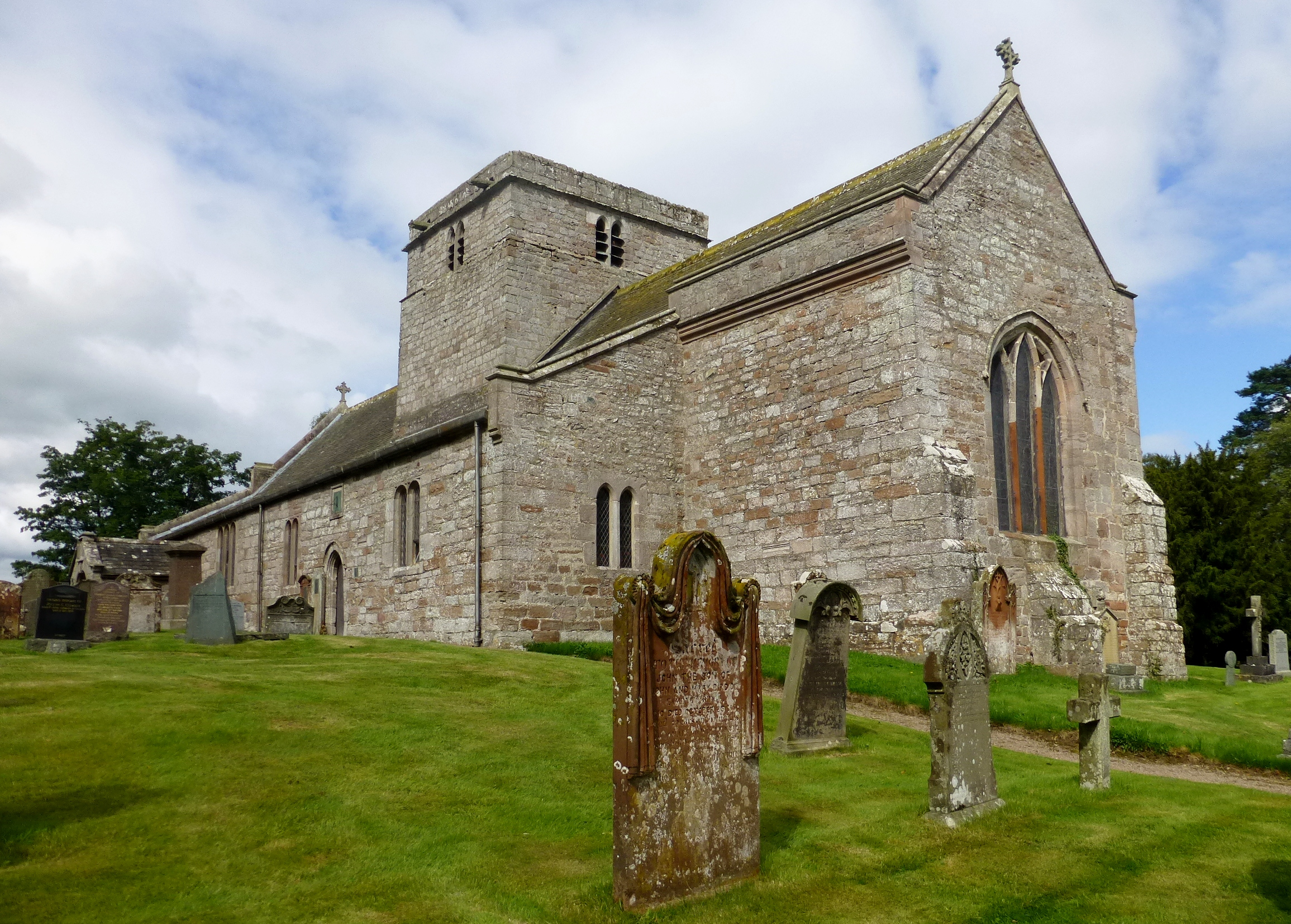
- St Michael's Church

- Location in former Eden District, Cumbria Location within Cumbria
- Population: 238 (2011)
- OS grid reference: NY4724
- Unitary authority: Westmorland and Furness
- Ceremonial county: Cumbria
- Region: North West
- Country: England
- Sovereign state: United Kingdom
- Post town: PENRITH
- Postcode district: CA10
- Dialling code: 01768
- Police: Cumbria
- Fire: Cumbria
- Ambulance: North West
- UK Parliament: Westmorland and Lonsdale

Barton and Pooley Bridge is a civil parish in Westmorland and Furness, Cumbria, England. The parish is on the edge of the Lake District National Park, and had a population of 232 according to the 2001 census, increasing slightly to 238 at the 2011 Census. The parish includes the village of Pooley Bridge, the small hamlet of Barton, and part of Ullswater, and extends south as far as Loadpot Hill. It has an area of 16.95 square kilometres (6.54 sq mi) and a 2011 population density of 14/sqkm (36/sqmi). The parish was renamed from "Barton" to "Barton and Pooley Bridge" on 1 April 2019.

The parish was once much bigger and included the present civil parishes of Patterdale, Yanwath and Eamont Bridge and Sockbridge and Tirril.

== Toponymy ==
Whaley suggests that 'Barton' is 'the barley farm or outlying grange', from OE 'beretūn' or, more probably, 'bærtūn', which was used of farms, especially outliers of large estates, used for storing crops." OE=Old English.

== Governance ==
The parish has a parish council, the lowest tier of local government.

It was in the Askham ward of Eden District until 2023. It is within the parliamentary constituency of Westmorland and Lonsdale.

== See also ==
- Listed buildings in Barton and Pooley Bridge
