= Loadpot Hill =

Fell in the Lake District, Cumbria, England

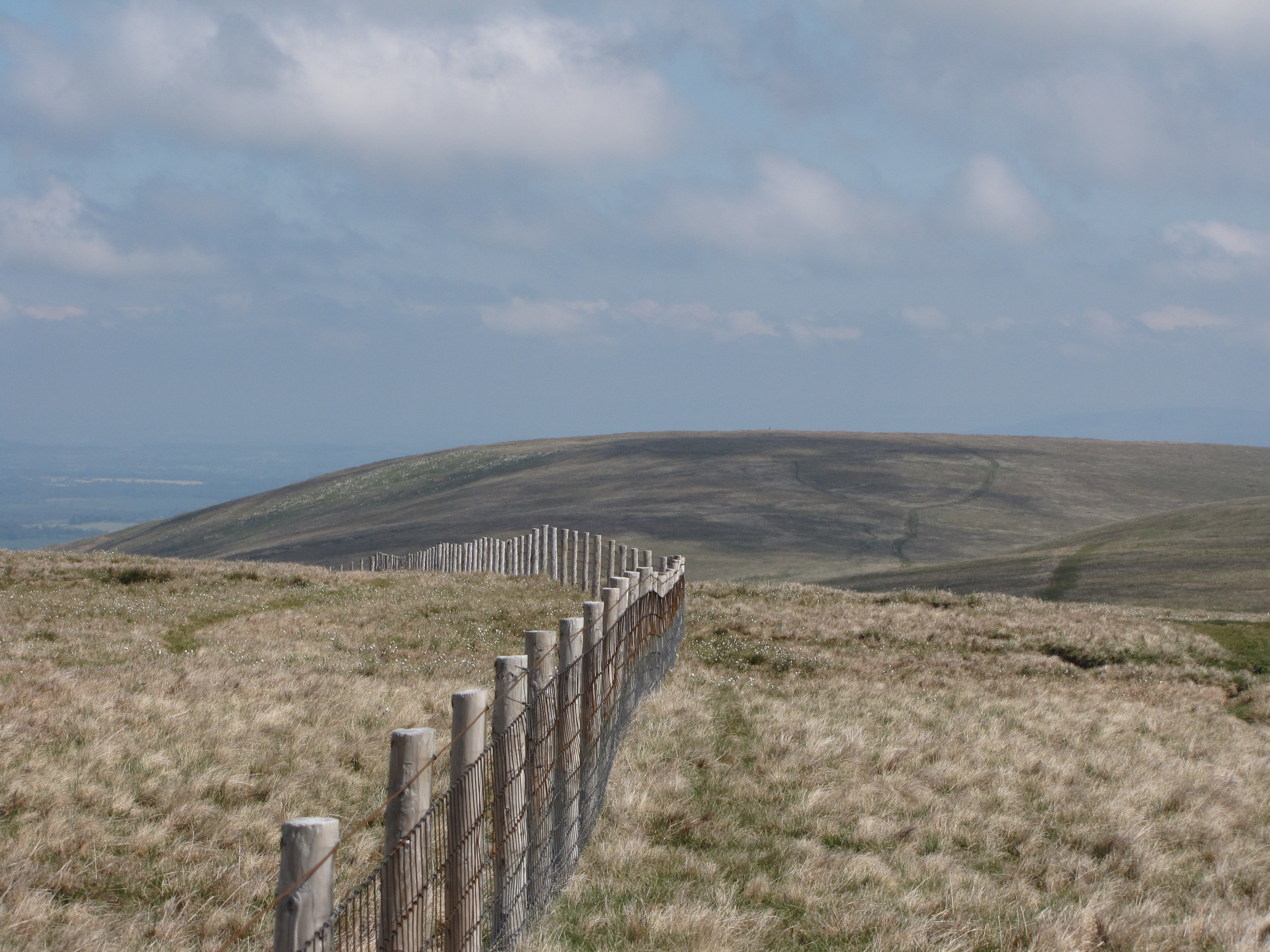
- Seen from the summit of Wether Hill, 2 km to the south.

Highest point
- Elevation: 672 m (2,205 ft)
- Prominence: c. 50 m (165 ft)
- Parent peak: High Raise
- Listing: Hewitt, Wainwright, Nuttall
- Coordinates: 54°33′19″N 2°50′28″W

Geography
- Location within the Lake District
- Location: Cumbria, England
- Parent range: Lake District, Far Eastern Fells
- OS grid: NY457181
- Topo map: OS Explorer OL5

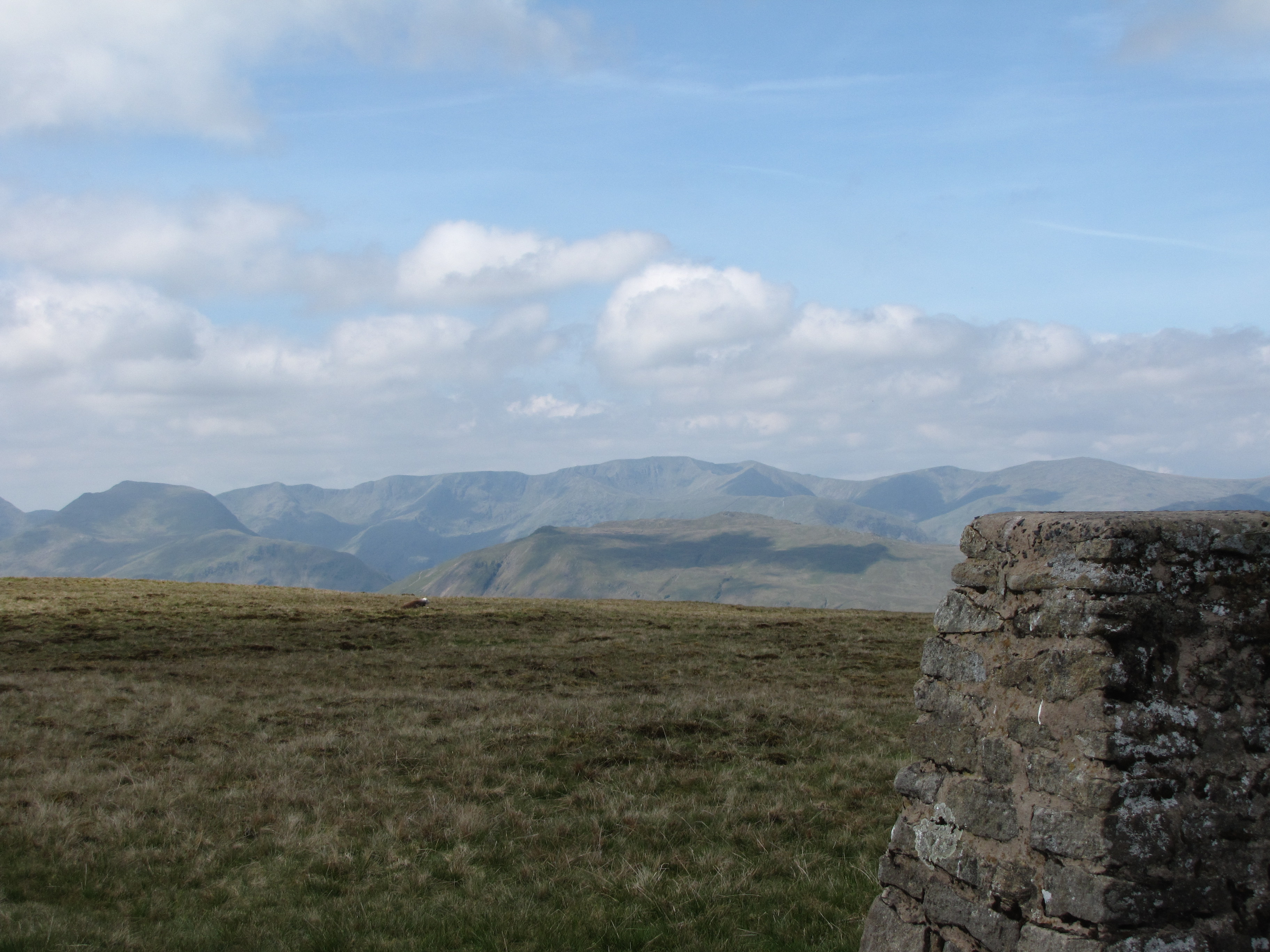
The view west from the trig point to the Helvellyn range.

Loadpot Hill is a fell in the English Lake District, between Haweswater and Ullswater.

== Topography ==
Although of moderate height, Loadpot Hill and its descending ridges cover an area of around 12 square miles (31 km^{2}). Standing to the north of Wether Hill, Loadpot Hill is the last principal height on the main ridge of the Far Eastern Fells, before the land falls away to Penrith and the River Eamont.

The western slopes of the fell drop swiftly to Fusedale over a few outcrops of rock, Fusedale Beck flowing due north to Ullswater. North north west and north from Loadpot Hill, two short spurs fan out to the twin tops of Bonscale Pike and Arthur's Pike. These two fells, both with craggy faces overlooking Ullswater, are separated by Swarthbeck Gill.

North east from Loadpot Hill the main ridge becomes broad and indistinct, falling gently in stages between the rivers Eamont and Lowther. These empty Ullswater and Haweswater respectively and converge 8 miles (13 km) from the summit, just south of Penrith. In fellwalking terms the practical northern boundary of Loadpot Hill is the road from Pooley Bridge to Askham. This encloses broad slopes of heather and fell grass, with a wide depression at Moor Divock (1,060 ft / 320 m) and then a steeper rise to the independent top of Heughscar Hill (1,240 ft / 380 m). Continuing from here to the road, plantations and other forms of cultivation gradually increase.

Moor Divock is a site of historic interest, complete with tumuli, standing stones, boundary markers and stone circles. There are also sink holes and old quarries.

The north east ridge has Heltondale Beck to the south, a feeder of the Lowther. Beyond this an east ridge descends from Loadpot Hill between Heltondale and Cawdale, both of which are deeply cut. This ridge has a subsidiary top, The Pen, which bears a beacon (columnar cairn). The Lowther valley and the Askham-Bampton road form the eastern boundary of the fell.

South of Loadpot Hill a short ridge connects to Wether Hill, crossing a succession of peat hags.

== Summit ==
The broad top of Loadpot Hill has a trig point marking its highest point. A little to the south of the summit stood Lowther House, an old shooting lodge, but nothing now remains but a pile of stone from the chimney. The Roman road the high street which runs along the main ridge, makes a detour to the west around the summit of the fell before continuing north east via Moor Divock to Penrith.

An extensive Lakeland view can be seen to the west with the Pennines more distant to the east. Ullswater can be brought into sight by moving a little to the west.

== Ascents ==
The main ascents are from Bampton or Helton via the east ridge, Pooley Bridge or Askham via the north east ridge, or Howtown via Fusedale. Ascents via Arthur's Pike are also popular. A good path runs north and south, using the Roman road periodically, and fainter paths also follow the branching ridges.
