= Fusedale =

Fusedale is a surname. Notable people with the surname include:

- Neil Fusedale (born 1967), English cricketer
- Reg Fusedale (1890–1990), Australian rugby league footballer
