= Bonscale Pike =

Hill in the Lake District, Cumbria, England

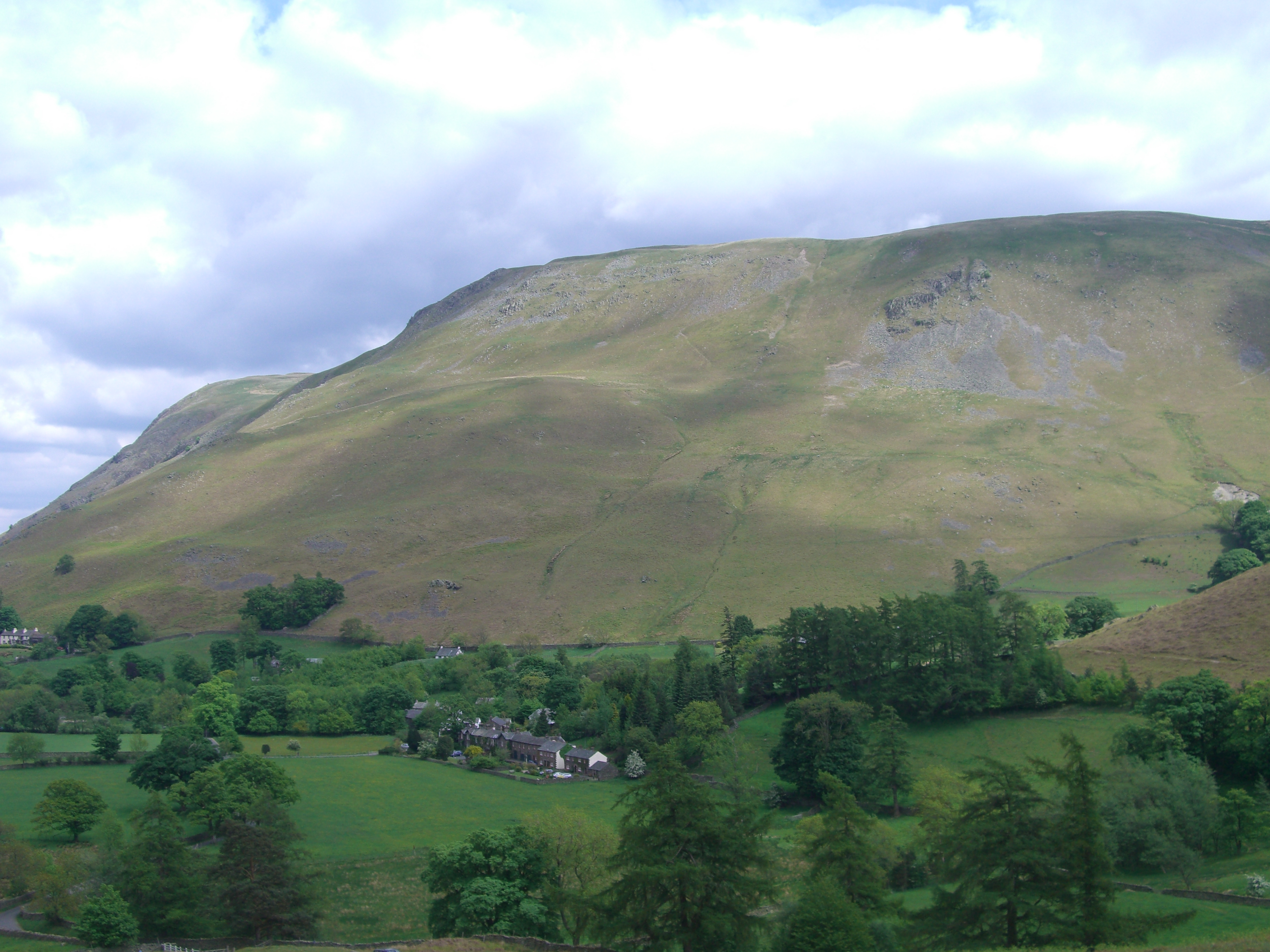
- Seen from the Howtown zig zags, one km to the SW.

Highest point
- Elevation: 524 m (1,719 ft)
- Prominence: less than 10 m (30 ft)
- Parent peak: Loadpot Hill
- Listing: Wainwright
- Coordinates: 54°34′23″N 2°50′52″W

Geography
- Location within the Lake District
- Location: Cumbria, England
- Parent range: Lake District, Far Eastern Fells
- OS grid: NY453201
- Topo map: OS Explorer OL5

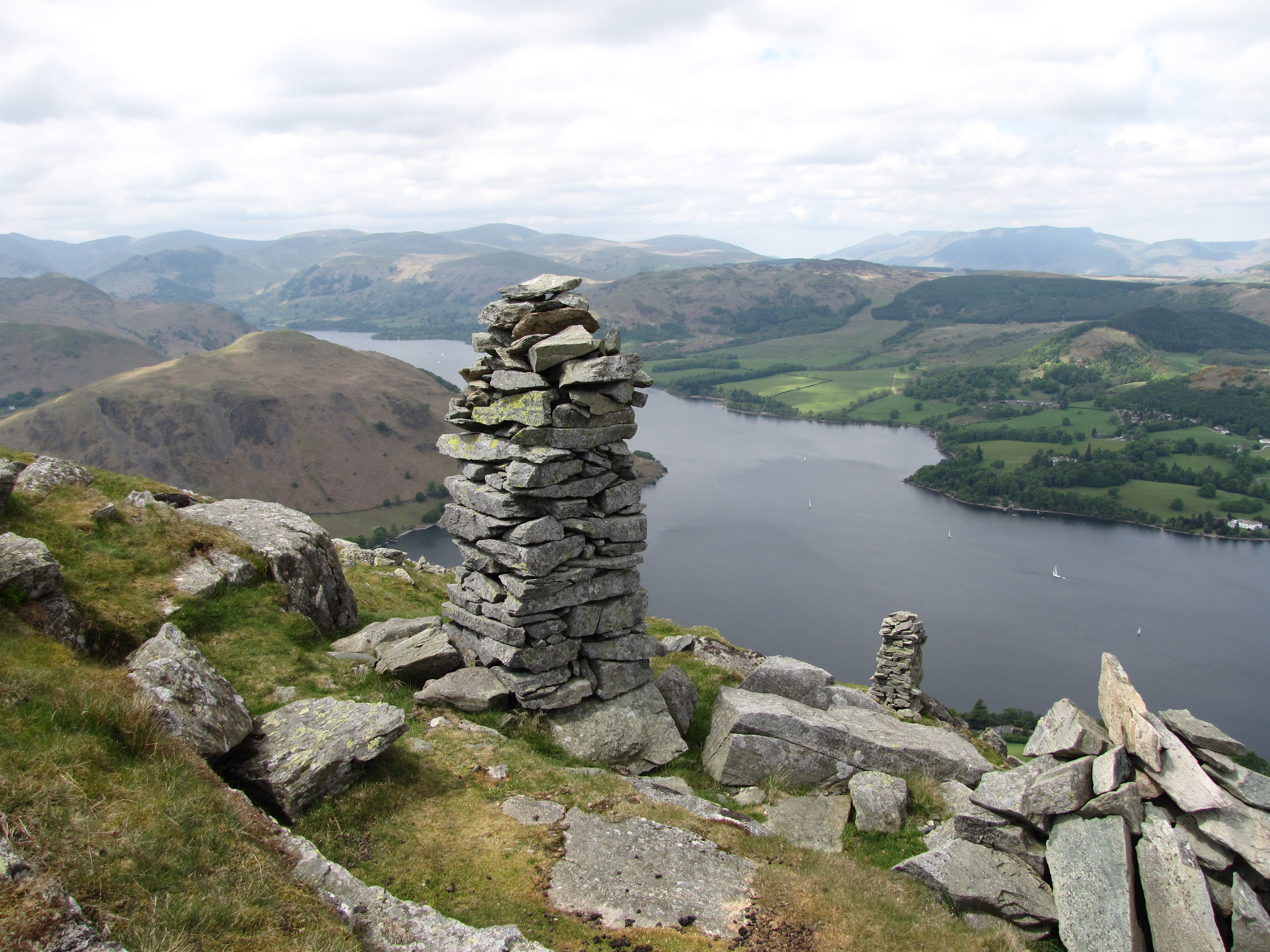
The view west from the summit over Ullswater and showing the Bonscale towers.

Bonscale Pike is a fell in the English Lake District, standing above Howtown on Ullswater. It is the northern end of a spur running north north west from Loadpot Hill on the main ridge of the Far Eastern Fells.

== Topography ==
From Loadpot Hill the ridge gradually narrows on the approach to Bonscale Pike, first crossing a marshy area and then the domed intermediate top of Swarth Fell, 1,788 ft (545 m). The ground from here onward is easy going with a covering of fell grass. Bonscale Pike stands on the north facing point as the boundaries of the ridge converge. Swarthbeck Gill on the east – which separates the fell from its twin, Arthur's Pike – falls to Ullswater through a ravine. The western boundary is formed by Fusedale Beck which also flows to the lake.

Bonscale Pike would be unlikely to register as a separate fell, but for the craggy western face. This is seen to best effect from Howtown or from a steamer on Ullswater, and swayed Wainwright to give the top a chapter in its own right.

== Summit ==
Depending upon their state of repair, two fine beacons (columnar cairns) may be prominent in the views from below. Bonscale Tower is the lower one, and both are placed on the rim of the crags. The actual summit is marked by a small cairn on a grassy mound, some yards behind. The view is masked to the south by Loadpot Hill, but the Helvellyns are well seen across the lake.

== Ascents ==
Ascent is usually from Howtown, a path slanting up across the breast of the fell. The crags can either be rounded to the north via the beacons, or via a more direct line to the south. The latter has no clear path. A fair path runs along the ridge to Loadpot Hill, crossing the High Street Roman road to the south of Brock Crag, a number of old boundary stones being encountered on this route. A traverse can also be made to Arthur's Pike, crossing Swarthbeck Gill near its source.
