= Wether Hill (Lake District) =

Fell in the Lake District, Cumbria, England

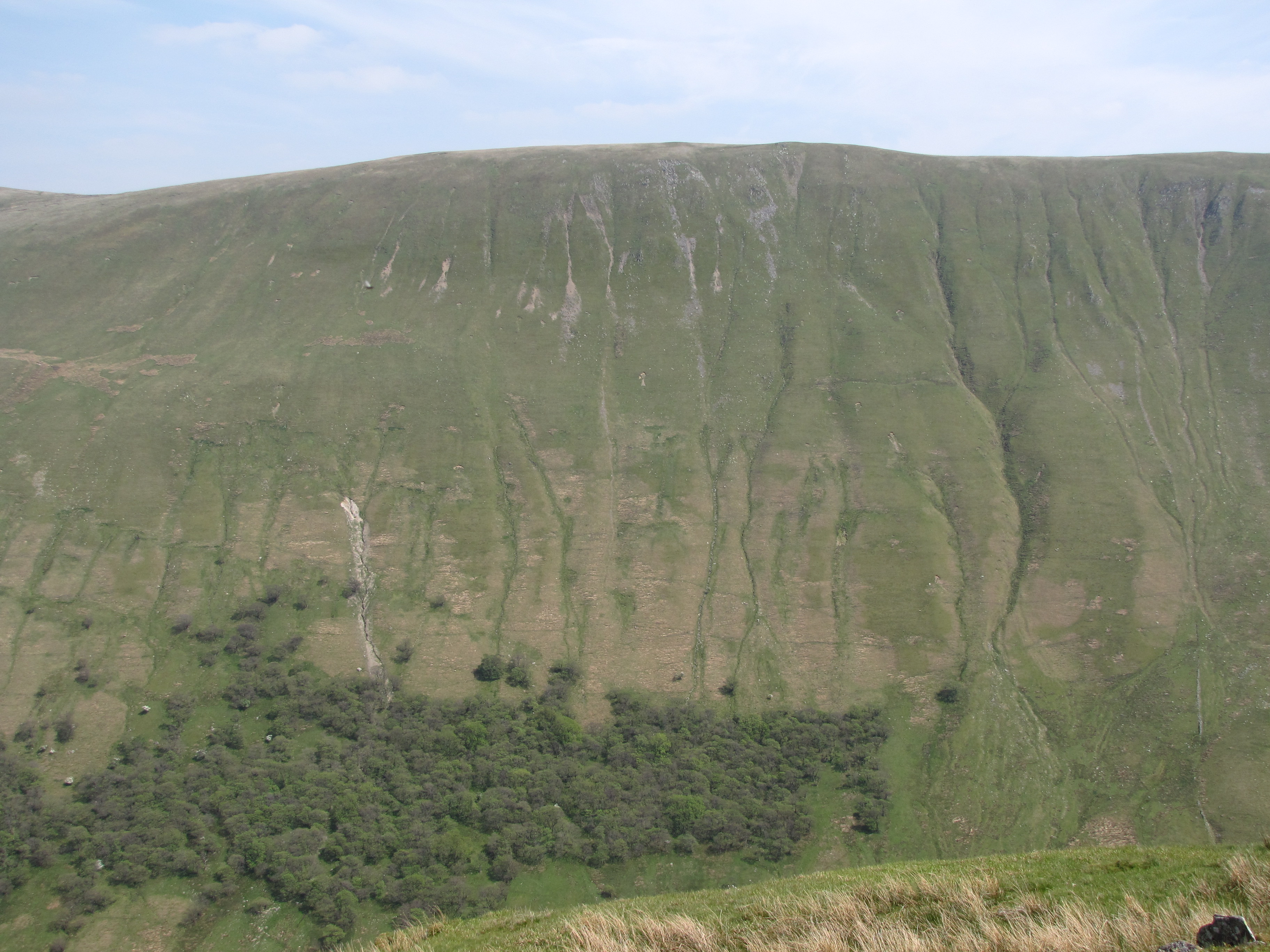
- Seen from The Nab, 2 1/2 kilometres (1 1/2 miles) to the SW. Wether Hill's western slopes drop steeply into Martindale.

Highest point
- Elevation: 674 m (2,211 ft)
- Prominence: < 20 m (66 ft)
- Parent peak: High Raise
- Listing: Wainwright, Nuttall
- Coordinates: 54°32′31″N 2°50′20″W

Geography
- Location within the Lake District
- Location: Cumbria, England
- Parent range: Lake District, Far Eastern Fells
- OS grid: NY456167
- Topo map: OS Explorer OL5

Wether Hill is a fell in the English Lake District, between Martindale and Haweswater. It lies on the main north-south ridge of the Far Eastern Fells between Loadpot Hill and High Raise. Lesser ridges also radiate out to the east and north-west. It should not be confused with Wether Hill in north Northumberland.

== Topography ==
North of Wether Hill, across a broad depression, is Loadpot Hill, the height of the two being almost equal. Flowing east from this col is Howe Grain, a feeder of Cawdale Beck. This in turn flows through a U-shaped valley and finally – renamed Howes Beck – passes through Bampton to the Lowther.

Between Cawdale Beck and the Haweswater catchment further south runs Wether Hill's three mile eastern ridge. This begins at High Kop on the summit plateau and then narrows to form the subsidiary height of Low Kop (1,876 ft / 572 m). From here a spur runs north east down The Hause into Cawdale. The east ridge however continues over Bampton Fell to a series of rocky tops above the northern shore of Haweswater. Among these are Four Stones Hill (complete with standing stones), Great and Little Birkhouse Hills and Pinnacle How, before the high ground peters out at Haweswater Beck.

South of Wether Hill the main ridge narrows before climbing to Red Crag, an outlier of High Raise. Flowing east from this depression are the feeders of Measand Beck. This runs below Low Kop and Bampton Fell, entering Haweswater halfway along the northern edge. Before the raising of the lake, silt carried down Measand Beck formed The Straits, a narrow waist between the two halves of the original lake. The area was farmed from Measand Beck Hall, now submerged.

The western face of Wether Hill falls steeply into Rampsgill, part of the Martindale valley system, with some broadleaved plantations at the base. Partway down the slope is the protuberance of Gowk Hill (1,545 ft / 471 m). This is a round grassy dome from which a rocky spur descends northwards over Brownthwaite Crag and Steel Knotts. Enclosed between this and Loadpot Hill is the little valley of Fusedale.

== Summit ==
The grassy top of Wether Hill has two summits of similar height. The southern is broader, but the northern top bears a cairn and is the traditional summit. High Kop and the start of the east ridge fall from the south summit. The Roman road (High Street), which runs along the north-south ridge, narrowly avoids both tops. There are good views west to the Helvellyn range and a wide vista toward the Pennines in the opposite direction.

== Ascents ==
Ascents from Martindale can be made via Steel Knotts or Fusedale. From Haweswater (Burnbanks) the approach can be made via Measand Beck or the east ridge. The east ridge can also be gained halfway along via The Hause from Bampton. Wether Hill is often also climbed incidentally from the Roman road while passing along the main ridge from High Raise to Loadpot Hill.
