= High Raise (High Street) =

Mountain in the English Lake District, Cumbria, England

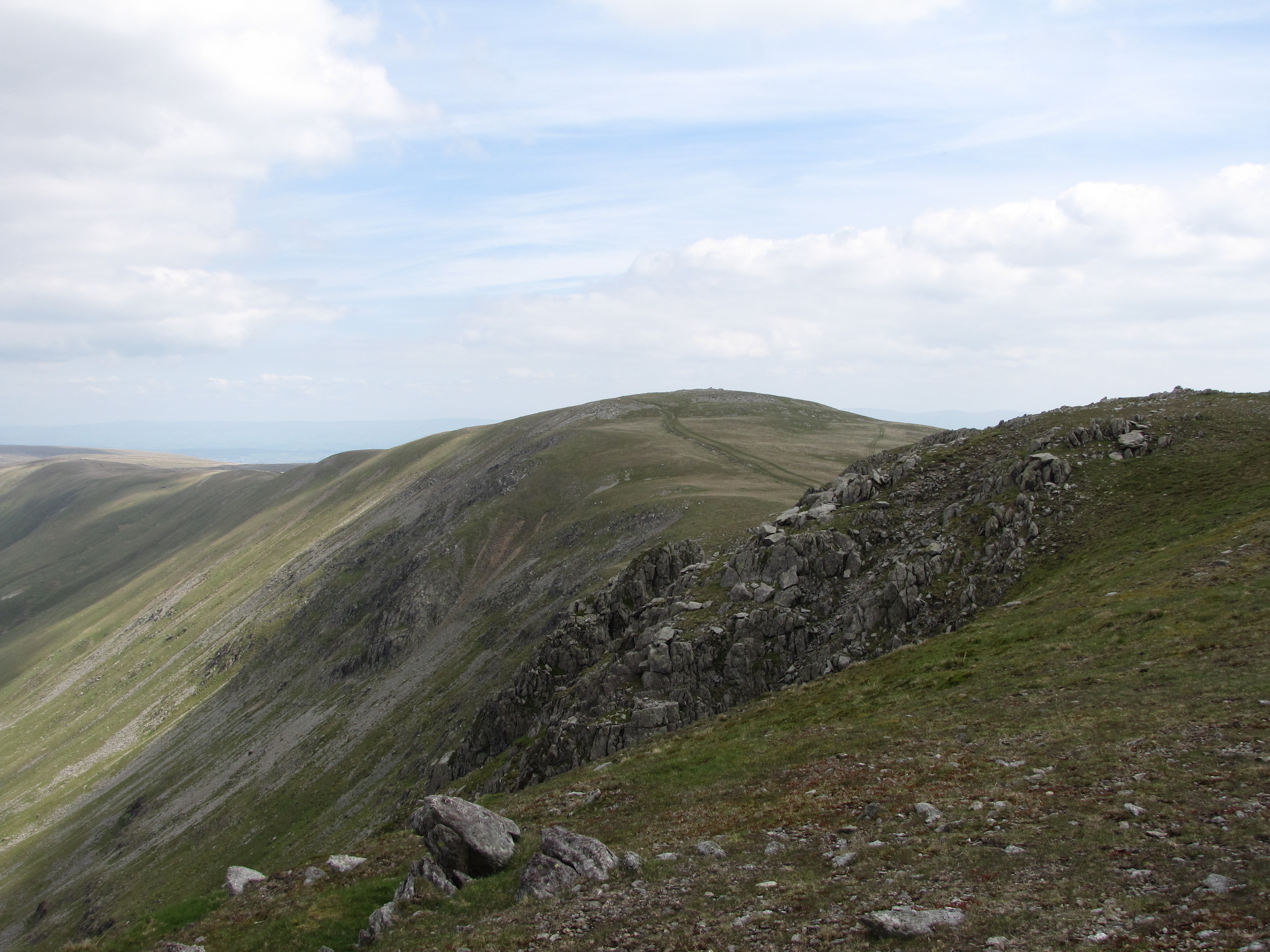
- Seen from Rampsgill Head, one km. to the south.

Highest point
- Elevation: 802 m (2,631 ft)
- Prominence: c. 90 m
- Parent peak: High Street
- Listing: Hewitt, Wainwright, Nuttall
- Coordinates: 54°30′47″N 2°51′04″W

Geography
- Location within the Lake District
- Location: Cumbria, England
- Parent range: Lake District, Far Eastern Fells
- OS grid: NY448135
- Topo map: OS Explorer OL5

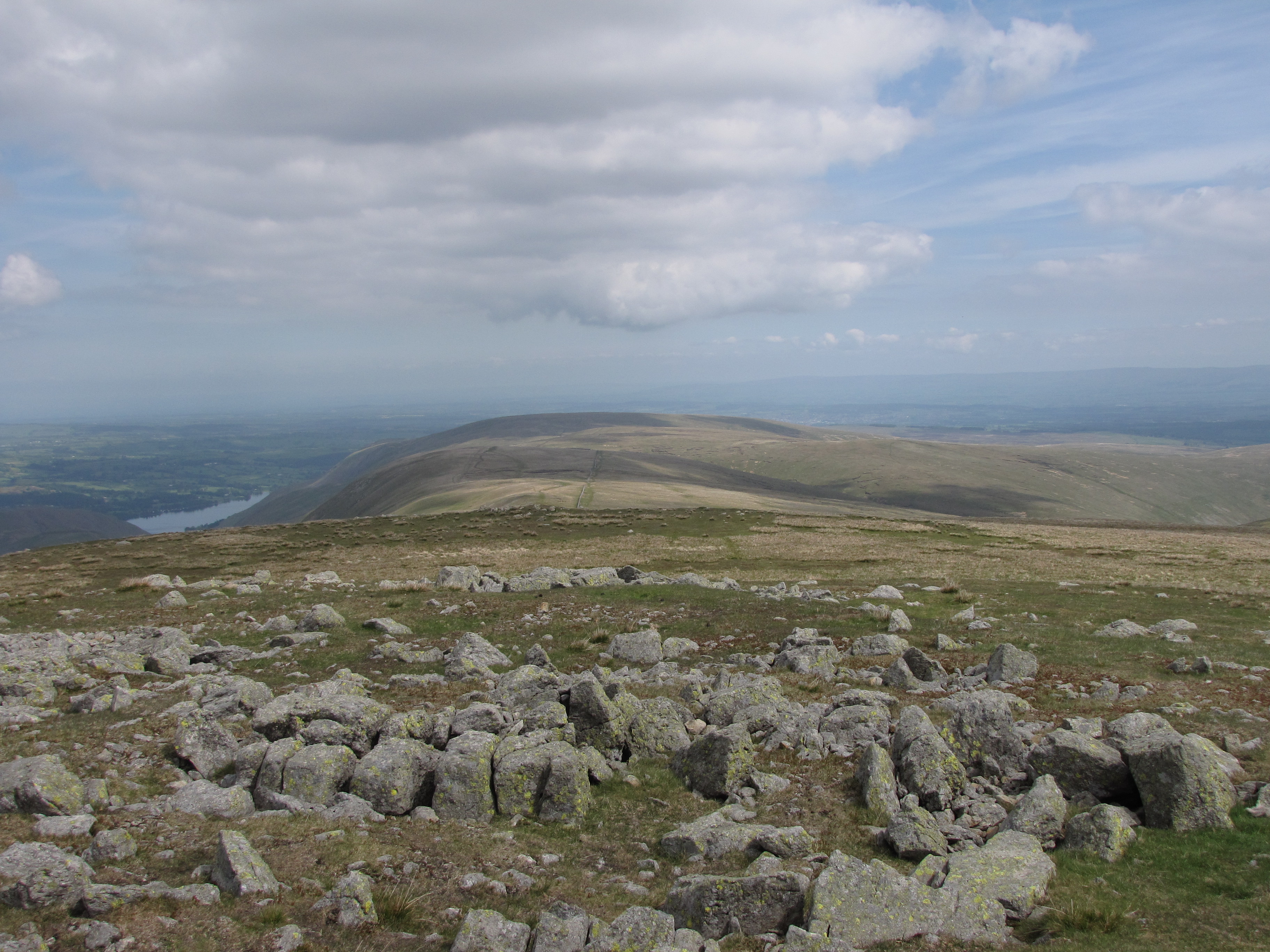
Looking north from the summit to Wether Hill and Loadpot Hill.

High Raise is a fell in the English Lake District, standing to the west of Haweswater Reservoir in the Far Eastern Fells. Note that another High Raise is the highpoint of the Central Fells.

== Topography ==
High Raise is on the main north-south spine of the Far Eastern Fells between Wether Hill and Rampsgill Head. Its eastern slopes drop to Haweswater and its western flank is the steep scree-lined side of Rampsgill.

The main ridge north to Wether Hill passes over the two intermediate tops of Raven Howe (2,345 feet, 715 m) and Red Crag (2,332 feet, 711 m), before dropping to the depression of Keasgill Head. This ridge is grassy but quite narrow and carries the High Street Roman road. There is a small tarn to the south of Red Crag. In the other direction the ridge turns a little westward across a narrow depression to Rampsgill Head.

East of High Raise, about half a mile away, is its companion Low Raise (2,473 feet, 754 m). This broad top carries a tumulus of bleached stones, some of which have since been used to form a cairn and wind shelter. The stones do not appear native to their location. East of Low Raise the craggy bowl of Whelter Crags is gouged out of the hillside above the reservoir. Two ridges run north and south around it to the shore. The more extensive north-east ridge, Long Grain, curves around between Measand Beck and Whelter Bottom. Its top begins as a wide plateau before giving way to crags above Haweswater. The south-east ridge gradually narrows, becoming rockier before taking a final plunge over Castle Crag. This is the site of an ancient hill-fort and some earthworks are just about discernible. South of this ridge, separating it from Kidsty Pike, is Randale.

== Summit ==
The summit of High Raise is stony, particularly in comparison to its neighbours, and a large cairn has been raised up a few yards east of the Roman road. The views westward provide a fine Lakeland panorama.

== Ascents ==
Ascents can be made from Martindale to the north or from Mardale via the south east and north east ridges. High Raise can also be climbed as part of a longer walk from Patterdale, Hartsop or Bampton, but other fells need to be ascended first. There are few good paths on the fell, other than the High Street. This is due in part to the loss of Mardale Green village when the lake was raised in the mid 1930s.
