= Neil Fusedale =

English cricketer (born 1967)

Personal information
- Full name: Neil Andrew Fusedale
- Born: 11 November 1967 (age 59); Hendon, Middlesex, England
- Batting: Right-handed
- Bowling: Slow left-arm orthodox

Domestic team information
- Years: Team
- 2000: Berkshire
- 1999/00-2001/02: Gauteng
- 1997/98-1998/99: Easterns
- 1994/95-1996/97: Transvaal
- 1994/95-1996/97: Transvaal B
- 1990–1995: Berkshire

Career statistics
Competition	FC	LA
Matches	15	44
Runs scored	226	129
Batting average	17.38	5.60
100s/50s	–/–	–/–
Top score	44*	32*
Balls bowled	3,262	1,945
Wickets	41	42
Bowling average	37.70	31.47
5 wickets in innings	1	–
10 wickets in match	–	–
Best bowling	5/170	3/26
Catches/stumpings	13/–	14/–
- Source: Cricinfo, 9 October 2010

Neil Andrew Fusedale (born 11 November 1967) is a former English cricketer. Kendrick was a right-handed batsman who bowled slow left-arm orthodox. He was born at Hendon, Middlesex.

== Early career with Berkshire ==
He made his debut in County Cricket for Berkshire in the 1990 Minor Counties Championship against Cornwall. From 1990 to 1995, he represented the county in 25 Minor Counties Championship matches. Fusedale also made his debut in the MCCA Knockout Trophy for Berkshire against Buckinghamshire in 1992. From 1992 to 1994, he represented the county in 4 Trophy matches. He also made his debut in List-A cricket for the county against Derbyshire in the 1992 NatWest Trophy, followed by another List-A appearance in the 1994 NatWest Trophy against Kent.

== Cricket in South Africa ==
Fusedale made his first-class debut for Transvaal B in the 1994/95 South African cricket season against Eastern Transvaal. From 1994/95-1996/97 he represented Transvaal B in 9 first-class matches, the last of which came against Western Province B. His debut in List-A debut in South African cricket came for the main Transvaal cricket team against Eastern Transvaal. From 1994/95-1996/97 he represented Transvaal in 10 List-A matches, the last of which came against Boland.

For the 1997/98, Fusedale joined Easterns, where he made his first-class debut for the team against North West. He played 2 further first-class matches for the team during that season, against Eastern Province B and Western Province B. He also represented the team in List-A cricket. He made his debut for the team in that format during the 1997/98 season against Eastern Province. From 1997/98 to 1998/99, he represented the team in 19 List-A matches, the last of which came against KwaZulu-Natal.

Fusedale joined Gauteng (formerly his previous team Transvaal) for the 1999/2000 season, making his List-A debut for the team against Northerns. From the 1999/2000 season to the 2001/02 season, he represented the team in 11 List-A matches, the last of which came against Eastern Province. His first-class debut for the team came in the 2000/01 season against Griqualand West. He played 2 further first-class matches for the team, which came against Griqualand West and KwaZulu-Natal, which marked his final career first-class match.

In his combined first-class career he played 15 first-class matches. During these matches he had scored 226 runs at a batting average of 17.38, with a high score of 44*. With the ball he took 41 wickets at a bowling average of 37.70, with a single five wicket haul which gave him best figures of 5/170.

== Return to Berkshire ==
By 2000, Fusedale was once again representing Berkshire during the English cricket season. From 1995 to 2000, he represented the county in 9 Minor Counties Championship matches, the last of which came against Oxfordshire. In total, during his career he represented the team in 35 Minor Counties Championship matches. During his second spell at Berkshire he represented the county in 6 MCCA Knockout Trophy matches, the last of which came against Herefordshire. In total he represented Berkshire in 10 Trophy matches.

During the 2000 NatWest Trophy, he represented the county in 2 List-A matches against the Sussex Cricket Board and Durham. In his combined List-A career, he played 44 List-A matches. During these he scored 129 runs at an average of 5.60, with a high score of 32*. With the ball he took 42 wickets at an average of 31.47, with best figures of 3/26.

== Later career ==
In February 2020, he was named in South Africa's squad for the Over-50s Cricket World Cup in South Africa. However, the tournament was cancelled during the third round of matches due to the coronavirus pandemic.
