= St Michael's Church, Barton =

Coordinates: 54.6298°N 2.7954°W

St Michael's Church
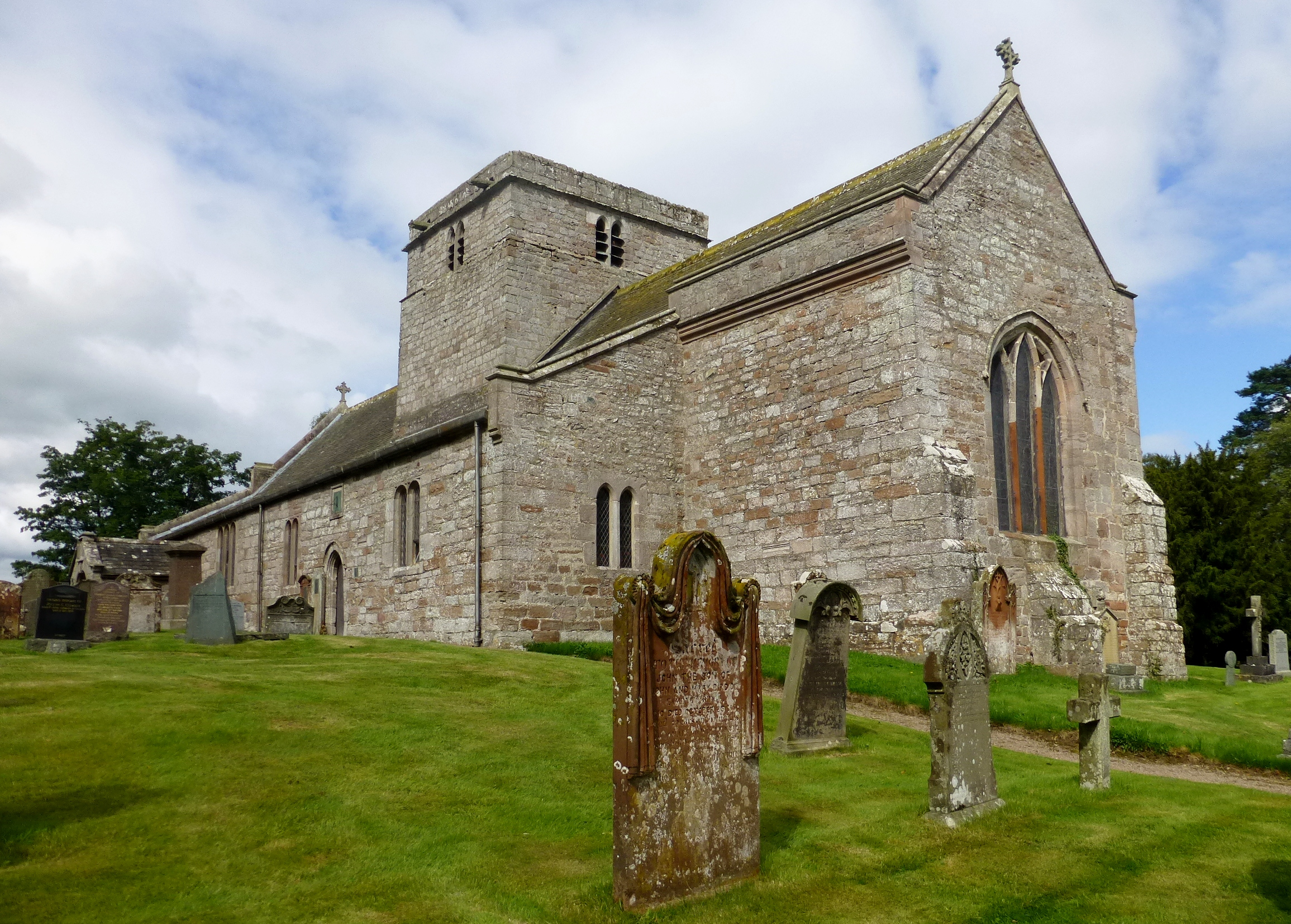
- St Michael's Church from the southeast

- Location in Eden, Cumbria Location in Cumbria, England
- OS grid reference: NY 488 264
- Location: Barton, Cumbria
- Country: England
- Denomination: Anglican
- Website: St Michael, Barton

History
- Status: Parish church

Architecture
- Functional status: Active
- Heritage designation: Grade I
- Designated: 6 February 1968
- Architectural type: Church
- Style: Norman, Gothic

Specifications
- Materials: Stone, slate roofs

Administration
- Province: York
- Diocese: Carlisle
- Archdeaconry: Carlisle
- Deanery: Penrith
- Parish: Barton

Clergy
- Vicar: Revd David C. Wood

St Michael's Church is in the village of Barton, Cumbria, England. It is an active Anglican parish church in the deanery of Penrith, the archdeaconry of Carlisle, and the diocese of Carlisle. Its benefice is united with those of St Paul, Pooley Bridge, St Peter, Martindale, and St Martin, Martindale. The church is recorded in the National Heritage List for England as a designated Grade I listed building. It stands in a circular churchyard, and possesses the only central Norman tower on a medieval church in Cumbria.

== History ==
The nave and tower date from the 12th century, the south aisle and arcade from the middle of the 13th century, and the north aisle and arcade, and the south chapel from about 1300. The chancel was lengthened in the 14th century, and the south porch was repaired in 1699. During the 19th century a stable was built to the north of the tower; this is now used as a vestry. The nave roof was installed in 1904.

== Architecture ==
=== Exterior ===
St Michael's is constructed in stone with slate roofs. In addition to the tower, Norman features are found in the north doorway, and in the arcades. The chapels and most of the windows are Perpendicular. The tower has paired bell openings and a plain parapet. In the gable of the porch are the arms of Lowther, or Lancaster.

=== Interior ===
Inside the church are three-bay arcades. The south arcade is carried on octagonal piers; the piers of the north arcade are of quatrefoil section. The east and west tower arches are double, consisting of a narrow Norman arch above a wider segmental arch. In the chapels to the south of the tower are two piscinas. The communion rails date from the 17th century, and the lectern and stalls from the early 20th century. The font is medieval, and has a large octagonal bowl. Also in the church are Royal Arms dated 1730. The stained glass dates from 1913; that in the east window is by C. E. Kempe, and in the west window by Hardman. In the chancel is a slab carved with a foliated cross, a sword, and a shield. Elsewhere are wall monuments, the earliest of which is dated 1674.

== External features ==
In the churchyard are twelve structures that have been listed at Grade II. These are: the Todd Monument, the Rowan Monument, a mounting block, the Glasson Monument, the Speight Monument, the Drewsher Monument, the Suder Monument, the Sisson Monument, another Todd Monument, a Nicholson Monument, another Nicholson Monument, and the Walker Monument.

== See also ==
- Grade I listed churches in Cumbria
- Grade I listed buildings in Cumbria
- Listed buildings in Barton, Cumbria
