= Pooley Bridge =

Village in Cumbria, England

Coordinates: 54.61197°N 2.82058°W

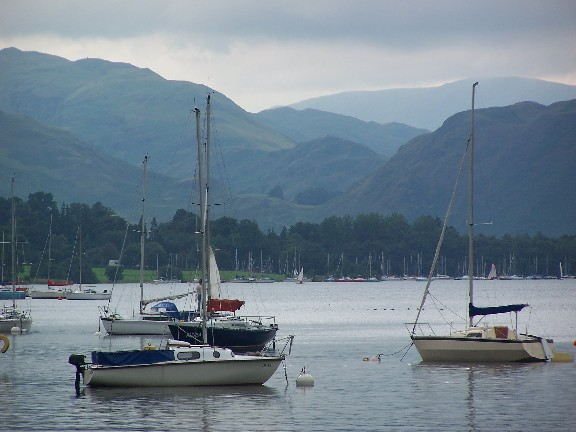
- Pooley Bridge

- Location in Eden, Cumbria Location within Cumbria
- OS grid reference: NY471244
- Civil parish: Barton and Pooley Bridge
- Unitary authority: Westmorland and Furness
- Ceremonial county: Cumbria
- Region: North West
- Country: England
- Sovereign state: United Kingdom
- Post town: PENRITH
- Postcode district: CA10
- Dialling code: 017684
- Police: Cumbria
- Fire: Cumbria
- Ambulance: North West
- UK Parliament: Westmorland and Lonsdale

Pooley Bridge is a village in the Westmorland and Furness of the northwestern English county of Cumbria, within the traditional borders of Westmorland.

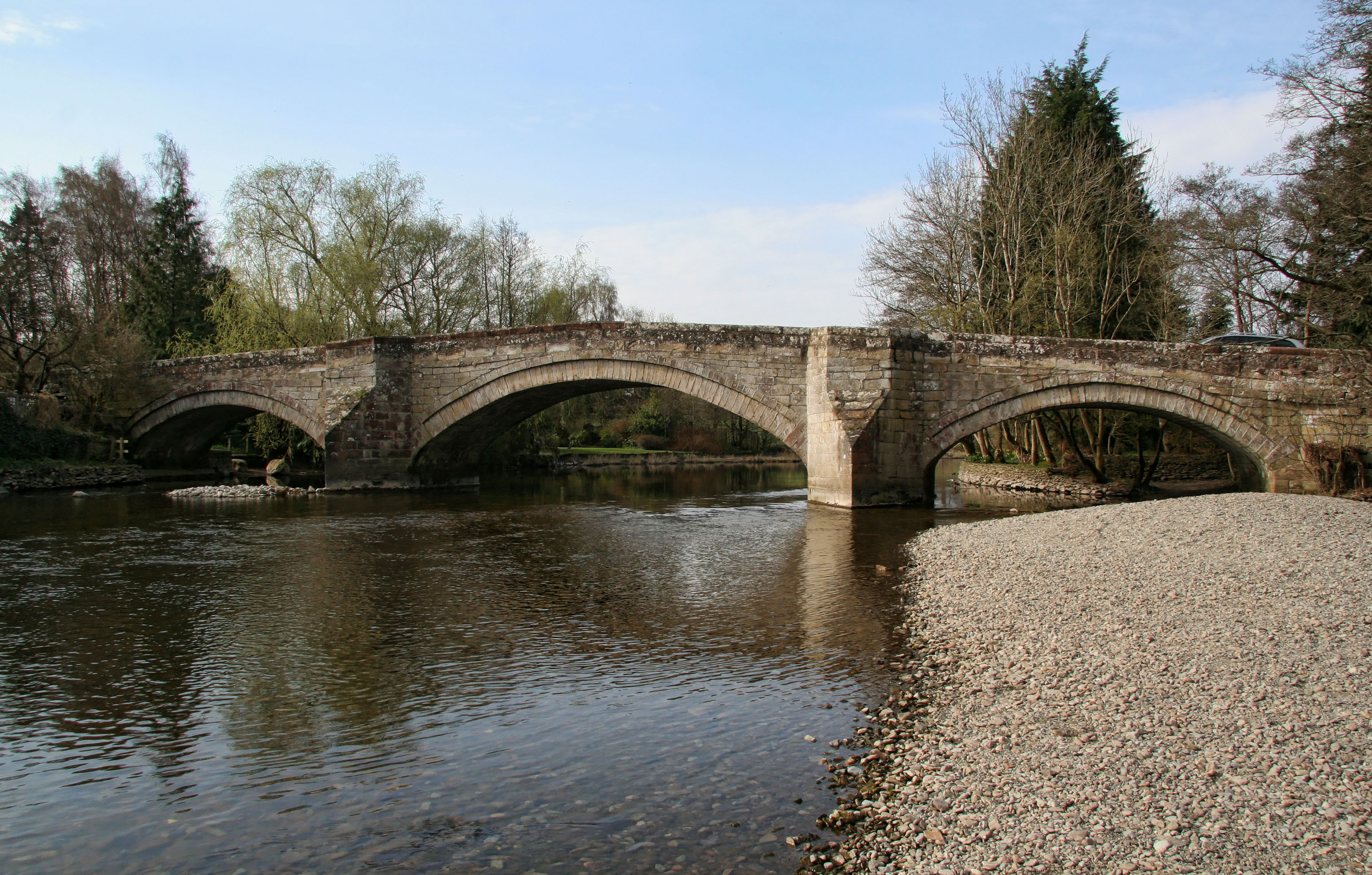
The mid-18th century Pooley bridge, which was completed in 1764, was washed away by floodwaters in December 2015.

The village takes its name from a bridge over the River Eamont at the northern end of Ullswater. The bridge, erected in 1764 and replacing an earlier bridge from the 16th century, collapsed on 6 December 2015 when Cumbria was hit by heavy flooding as a result of Storm Desmond. A temporary replacement bridge was opened on 20 March 2016. A new stainless steel bridge was lifted into place in May 2020, and opened in October 2020. There is a pier from which ferries (known as the Ullswater 'Steamers') provide connections to Glenridding and Howtown.

Pooley is mostly situated in the civil parish of Barton and Pooley Bridge, of which it is the main settlement. The few houses on the northern or Cumberland side of the bridge are in Dacre parish. The village is popular with tourists, especially during the summer, and has several hotels, guest houses and camping sites.
