= Yoke (Lake District) =

Fell in the Lake District, Cumbria, England

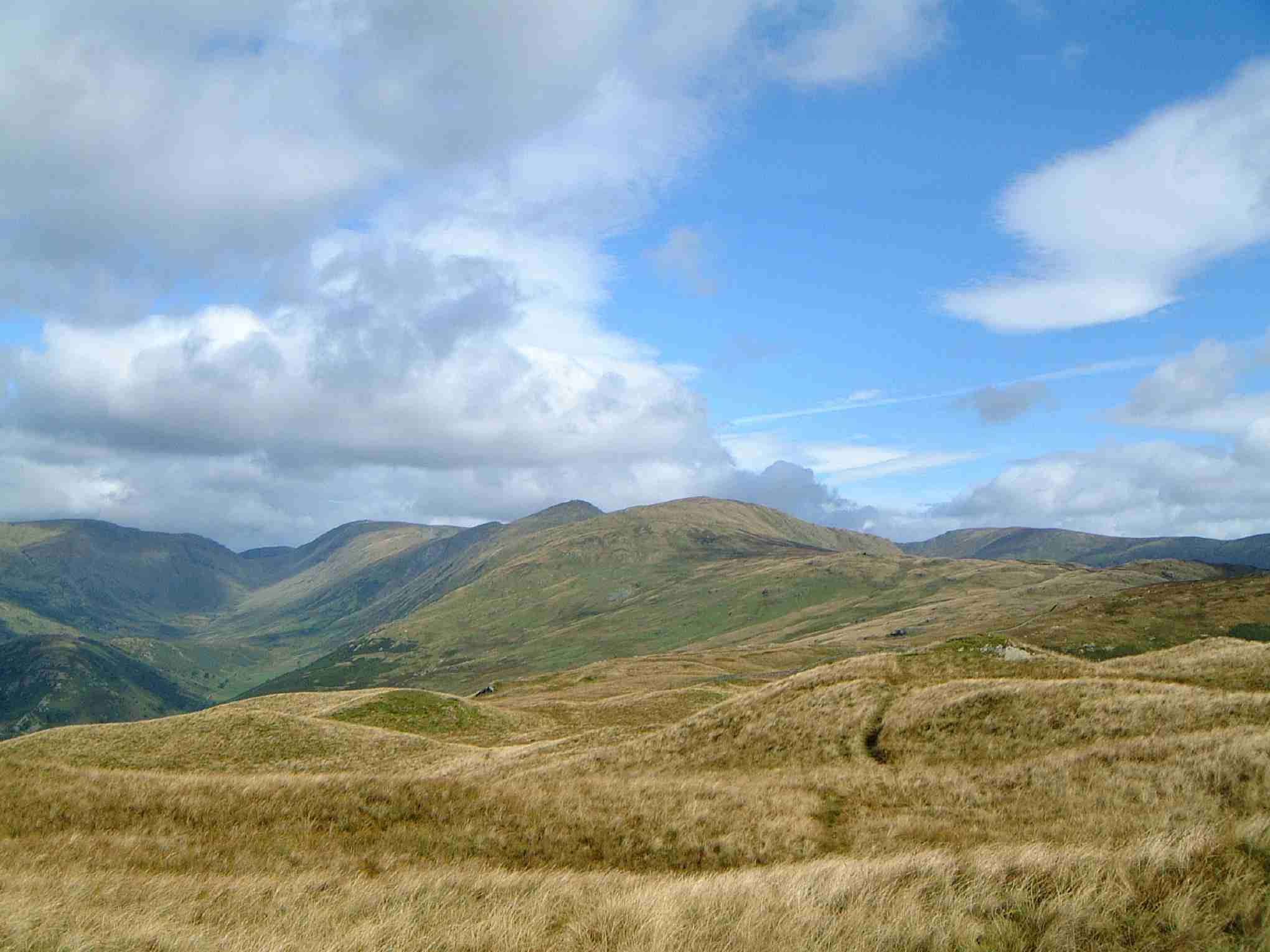
- Yoke seen from the Garburn Pass track on the approach from Troutbeck. The Troutbeck valley is to the left.

Highest point
- Elevation: 706 m (2,316 ft)
- Prominence: 38 m (125 ft)
- Parent peak: Ill Bell
- Listing: Hewitt, Nuttall, Wainwright
- Coordinates: 54°27′04″N 2°52′08″W

Geography
- Location within the Lake District
- Location: Cumbria, England
- Parent range: Lake District, Far Eastern Fells
- OS grid: NY437067
- Topo map: OS Explorer OL7

Yoke is a fell in the Lake District in Cumbria, England. It has a height of 706 metres (2,316 ft) and is situated in the far eastern sector of the national park, 6 1/2 kilometres (4 miles) ENE of the town of Ambleside. Yoke is the southern extremity of the long ridge that runs southwards from the fell of High Street. Yoke’s name is believed to be derived from the Old English language word geoc which is similar to the German word joch meaning mountain ridge.

== Ascents ==
Yoke is not known to Lake District writers as one of the most attractive fells but it is climbed frequently as part of the Kentmere Horseshoe, a 19-kilometre (12-mile) walk with 1,100 metres (3,600 foot) of ascent that starts and finishes in the village of Kentmere and takes in the other fells of Kentmere Pike, Harter Fell, Mardale Ill Bell, High Street, Thornthwaite Crag, Froswick and Ill Bell. Most common direct ascents go via the summit of the Garburn Pass (Byway open to all traffic), which can be reached either from Kentmere or Troutbeck. At the top of the pass the walker turns northwards following a wall over initial boggy ground to reach the summit of the fell. Some repair work has been done on these southern slopes of Yoke to address the problem of footpath erosion

== Topography ==
Yoke’s most interesting topographic feature is Rainsborrow Crag on the Kentmere side of the fell. This is a 300-metre (980-foot) precipice which falls away to the valley floor; the crags have attracted top rock climbers. The little known Rainsborrow Tarn stands on the edge of the crags. It is possible that the Roman road between Ambleside and Penrith came over the slopes of Yoke: old maps have shown short stretches marked “roman road” on the fell. Yoke shows signs of former quarrying on both its Troutbeck and Kentmere flanks.

== Summit ==
The view from the top of the fell takes in good views of Windermere and Morecambe Bay, although this view is better from a cairn 100 metres (330 feet) to the south. There is also a good view of the higher fells to the west around Coniston, Langdale and beyond. The view north is obstructed by the higher fell of Ill Bell although the summit of High Street can just be seen. Kentmere Reservoir can be viewed by walking 150 metres (490 feet) north-east of the summit to the top of Star Crag.
