= Troutbeck SSSI =

Protected area in Cumbria, England

Coordinates: 54.464979°N 2.8916948°W

Troutbeck is a Site of Special Scientific Interest within Lake District National Park in Cumbria, England. This protected area is located 4km northeast of the town of Ambleside. This protected area extends from Troutbeck Tongue in the south to Thornthwaite Crag in the north. The streams Trout Beck and Hagg Gill flow through this protected area. This area is protected because of its grassland and fen habitats.

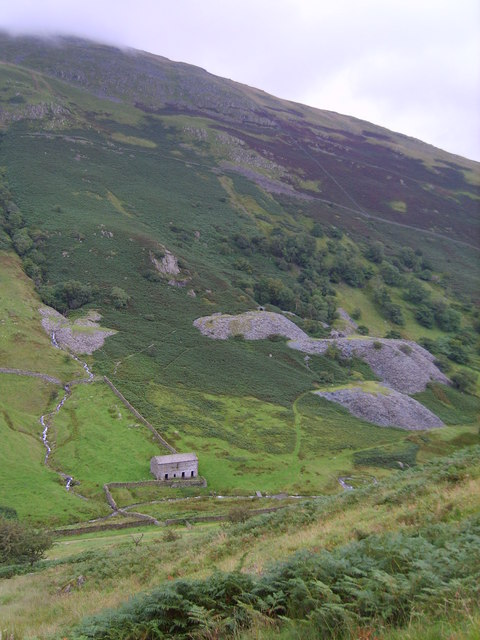
View of Hagg Gill valley

== Biology ==
Along the margins of the stream Trout Beck, mires have formed where there are peat soils. Herb species in this habitat include ragged-robin, marsh hawk's-beard, marsh valerian and heath spotted-orchid. Where mires are dominated by the moss species Sphagnum palustre and Sphagnum recurvum, herb species include bog asphodel, marsh violet and lesser spearwort. In nutrient-rich pastures herb species include devil's-bit scabious, round leaved sundew, and bird's-eye primrose, and moss species include Scorpidium scorpioides, Campylium stellatum and Sphagnum contortum.

On steep slopes at the headwaters of Hagg Gill montane herb species have been recorded, including Micranthes stellaris, Epilobium alsinifolium, Montia fontana, Chrysosplenium oppositifolium and the moss species Philonotis fontana.

Along a stream called Sad Gill, there are rock-ledge and scree habitats that have remained ungrazed. Herb species here include alpine lady's mantle, roseroot and mountain sorrel. Moss species here include Isopterygium pulchellum, Anoectangium aestivum and Bryum zieri. The fern species Asplenium viride has also been recorded in this habitat.

== Geology ==
The valleys in this protected area have been eroded by glaciers. The underlying rocks are from the Borrowdale Volcanic Series. Streams expose volcanic rocks such as lavas and tuffs. Deposits of glacial till and boulder clay are found in this protected area.

== Land ownership ==
Most of the land within this protected area is owned by the National Trust.
