= Kentmere Reservoir =

Water storage facility in Cumbria, England

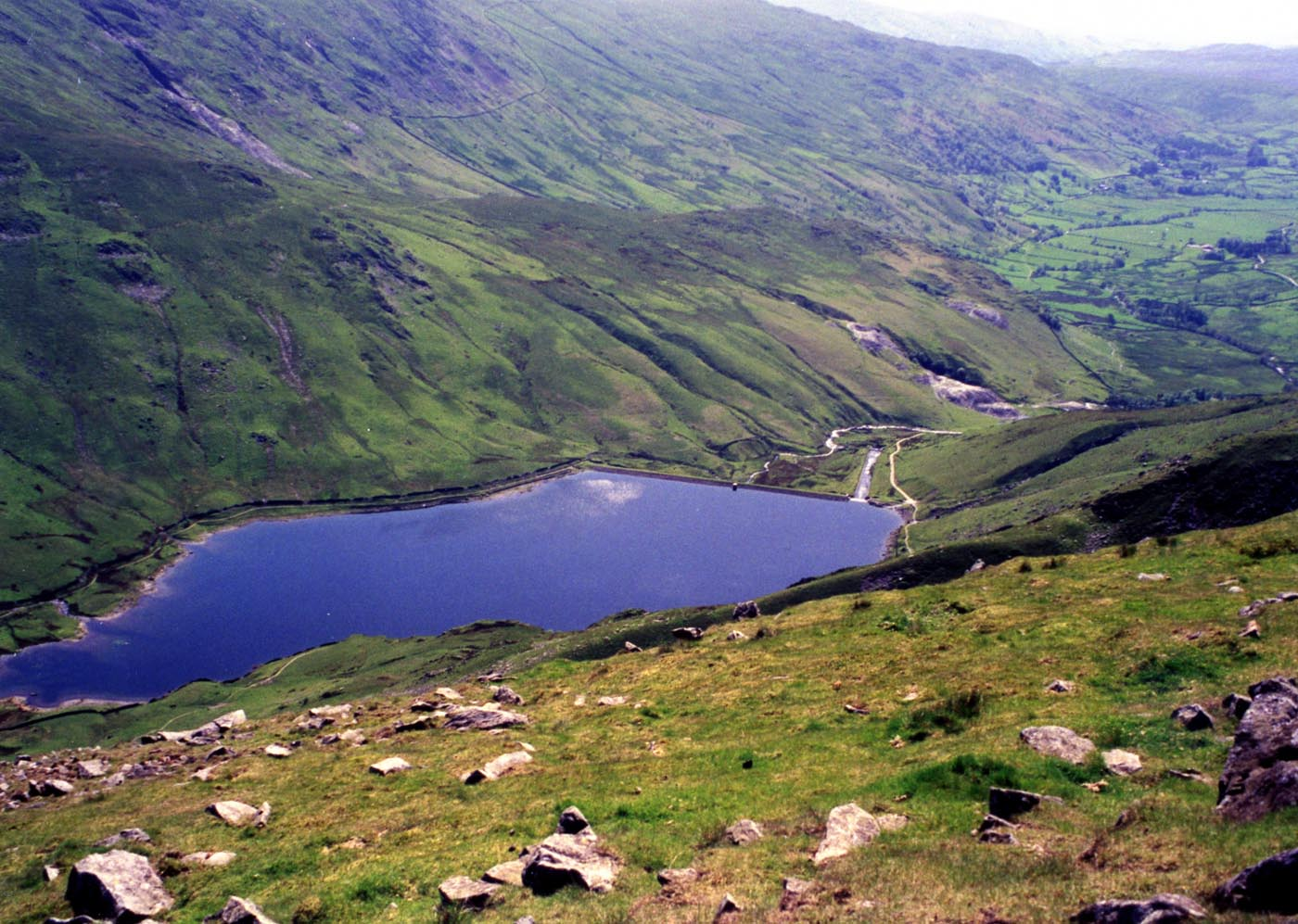
- Looking down on the reservoir from Froswick

- Location in the Lake District
- Location: Kentmere, Cumbria
- Coordinates: 54°27′54″N 2°51′27″W
- Type: reservoir
- Catchment area: 1,330 acres (5.4 km^{2})
- Basin countries: United Kingdom
- Surface area: 38.5 acres (15.6 ha)
- Water volume: 35.4 million cubic feet (1,000 Ml)

Kentmere Reservoir is a water storage facility situated in the Kentmere valley in the county of Cumbria, England. It is located 10.5 kilometres (6.5 mi) north-northeast of the town of Windermere. The reservoir is fed by the streams which form the headwaters of the River Kent which rise 1.5 kilometres (0.93 mi) to the north in Hall Cove on the southern slopes of a mountainous ridge called High Street, which is named after the nearby Roman road. It is also fed by Lingmell Gill, which drains the large corrie on the western side of Harter Fell beneath the Nan Bield Pass.

After Kentmere Tarn was drained to provide agricultural land in the 1840s, water supply to the mills further downstream became erratic, and the mill owners met to plan a reservoir to regulate the flow. They employed the water engineer John Frederick Bateman to advise, and the Kendal Reservoirs Act 1845 authorised five reservoirs. Despite Bateman's preference for the reservoir at Skeggles Water, the millers opted to build that at Kentmere Head, which was completed in 1848, but cost a lot more than estimated. Millers paid for the water based on the drop in river level at their mill, with small mills exempt from charges. Soon after its completion, cheap coal became available, as railways arrived in the area, and the number of mills using water power steadily declined. This process was exacerbated by the Water Resources Act 1963, under which the Lancashire River Authority levied prohibitive charges for using water to generate power.

The use of water power effectively ceased in 1972, with James Cropper becoming the owner of the reservoir, as the paper mills at Burneside were the last user of water from the reservoir. By 1995 there were serious problems with the dam, and there was talk of breaching the dam, so that it would no longer be subject to the provisions of the Reservoirs (Safety Provisions) Act 1930 (20 & 21 Geo. 5. c. 51). However, there was public outcry, because the reservoir is in an area of natural beauty, and despite not needing the water, Croppers paid for engineering work to remedy the faults, resulting in a slightly lower maximum water level, and a wall being constructed along the top of the dam to prevent wave action causing the downstream face to erode and possibly fail.

== History ==
Prior to 1800 most of the land around Kentmere was unenclosed common land, but at that time farms began to be bought by wealthy people from outside the area. They set about enclosing the land and improving the farms that they now owned. Lime from a quarry located above Kentmere Hall was used to condition the soil, and field drains were added to make the land more suitable for agriculture. The Wilsons, who owned Kentmere Hall, drained Kentmere Tarn in the 1830s, hoping that the reclaimed land would be of good quality. However, these alterations to the landscape had unexpected consequences for the mill owners further downstream who relied on the steady flow of the River Kent to maintain their operations. The loss of bogs which had released water into the river, maintaining its steady flow, meant that the flow fluctuated widely, interrupting operation of the mills.

The building of a reservoir to regulate the flow was a small part of a much bigger scheme to build a series of reservoirs in the parish of Kendal to regulate the River Sprint, otherwise known as the Sleddale Beck, the River Mint, known at the time as the Bannesdale Beck, and the River Kent. By 1844 there were 15 mills on the Kent, three on the Sprint and five on the Mint, processing wool, gunpowder, bobbins, logwood, dyewood, paper, marble and iron. Water power was important because there were no sources of coal nearby. A total of ten mill owners and the mayor of Kendal formed a provisional committee, which resolved to build reservoirs in Kentmere and elsewhere, to maintain flows on the rivers. The mayor was involved because Kendal Corporation owned the water rights and leasehold to Castle Mill.

The committee lost no time in employing the eminent water engineer John Frederick Bateman to advise on the scheme, who in turn commissioned Job Bintley to survey the proposed sites in September and October 1844. By November there was serious discussion in the local press, both for and against the scheme. Arguments against the scheme focused on the high cost, the fact that it would only be a benefit to a small number of mill owners, it would use up valuable agricultural land, and would cause desolation and loss of life if the dam burst. Those supporting the scheme argued that Kendal was losing out as a manufacturing town to those which had a cheap supply of coal, and enabling the mills to operate regularly would boost the manufacturing industry, and hence the prosperity of the town.

The provisional committee consisted of James Gandy of Dockray Hall woollen and dye-wood mill, Kendal; J. Wakefield of old Sedgwick and Bassing Ghyll gunpowder mills; John Ireland of Low Mills woollen mill and iron foundry; J. H. Wilson; John Whitwell also of Dockray Hall mill; Cornelius Nicholson of Cowan Head and Burneside paper mills; J. Philipson of Ullthwaite corn mill, Kentmere; B. Turton of Staveley bobbin mill; George Suart of Scroggs bobbin mill, near Staveley; and J. J. Wilson who bought Castle Mill from Kendal Corporation in 1853. They considered Bateman's report, and introduced a private bill into parliament in 1845 to get permission for the scheme.

=== Authorised works ===
Kendal Reservoirs Act 1845
- Act of Parliament
- Parliament of the United Kingdom
- Long title: An Act for making and maintaining Reservoirs in the Parish of Kendal in the County of Westmorland.
- Citation: 8 & 9 Vict. c. cxl

Dates
- Royal assent: 21 July 1845

The bill became an act of Parliament, the Kendal Reservoirs Act 1845 (8 & 9 Vict. c. cxl) on 21 July 1845. It authorised the building of Kentmere Head reservoir, with a capacity of 44 million cubic feet (1,200 Ml) impounded by an earth dam which was 57 feet (17 m) high. It collected water from an area of 1,330 acres (540 ha), which was relatively small, but the rainfall was high. It was situated in a region where there was a good supply of rock and boulder clay for the construction. The second reservoir was to be Skeggles Water, where a 26-foot (7.9 m) high dam would impound 85 million cubic feet (2,400 Ml). It would gather water from an area of 1,260 acres (510 ha), and would have had the largest surface area of the reservoirs, at 180 acres (73 ha), as opposed to just 40 acres (16 ha) for Kentmere Head. Three separate dams would have been built, and this reservoir was favoured by Bateman, because he thought it would cost the least, and would provide a similar yield to Kentmere Head. However, his estimates were wildly inaccurate, as was his prediction of the available rainfall.

On Bannisdale, Bateman proposed a lower and an upper reservoir, as to create a single reservoir would have required a dam with a height of 130 feet (40 m), which was too ambitious for the time. The lower reservoir required a dam with a height of 64 feet (20 m) to impound 84 million cubic feet (2,400 Ml), with the dam located below Dryhowe Bridge. The upper dam was to be located halfway up the valley, would have been slightly lower at 60 feet (18 m), but would have had more capacity, holding 140 million cubic feet (4,000 Ml) of water. The fifth reservoir authorised was in Longsleddale, with a 74-foot (23 m) high dam located just above Sadgill farm. With a capacity of 67 million cubic feet (1,900 Ml), it would have flooded most of the upper valley, with a water level at around 750 feet (230 m) above ordnance datum.

The act named 12 commissioners, several of whom had been on the original committee. All had to be occupiers of mills on the rivers affected, with an annual value exceeding £50. The mayor of Kendal was a commissioner while the corporation owned water rights. The others were John Wakefield of Sedgwick gunpowder mills; John Gandy, James Gandy, John Edward Whitwell and Isaac Whitwell of Dockray Hall Mills; John Jowitt Wilson, William Wilson, and John Hewetson Wilson of Castle Mills; John Ireland of Low Mills; Cornelius Nicholson of Cowan Head and Burneside paper mills; and Benjamin Turton of Staveley Bobbin Mill.

The commissioners could build any or all of the five reservoirs. As well as having powers to borrow money to fund construction, they could collect rates from individual mills, which were based on the number of feet of fall in level at that mill. Any corn mill with less than six pairs of stones did not have to pay rates, while the Barley Bridge corn mill at Staveley was exempt. The act also stated that the commissioners were the only ones authorised to build reservoirs in the named valleys. This fact was overlooked by Manchester Corporation in 1962 when they considered building a reservoir for drinking water supply in Bannisdale.

=== Works built ===
Despite Bateman's preference for the Skeggles Water reservoir, the commissioners decided to build Kentmere Head reservoir first. On 9 October 1845, they awarded a tender for construction of the dam to Messrs Shuttleworth and Dobson. The contract price was £6,150, and they also paid £960 for 48 acres (19 ha) of land. A cottage for the reservoir keeper was to cost £45. These costs exceeded Bateman's estimate by 60 percent, and Job Bintley's estimate when he had originally proposed the reservoir in 1844 by 350 percent. The total cost was £13,435 by the time the work was completed in the summer of 1848. Shortly afterwards, the bywash channel was damaged in a flood, and had to be repaired and extended at a cost of £686.

Although Bateman does not appear to have been involved during the actual construction, his specification for building the dam has been preserved by James Cropper of Burneside Paper Mill. It specifies that the clay core was to be built up in layers, each 8 inches (20 cm) thick, and that complete layers should be finished before work started on the next layer. The clay was to be soaked for 12 hours, and then cut into blocks, which were to be worked into the layer below by treading it. The earth dam was to be made of concave layers, 2 feet (0.61 m) thick on the upstream side, and twice that thickness on the downstream side. Material for the upstream side was to be adhesive, and watered in to become nearly waterproof, while the downstream bank was to be built of dry or stony material. The dam had a slope of 1 in 3 on the upstream face and 1 in 2 on the downstream face. A central clay core was 10 feet (3.0 m) thick at the crest of the dam and 12 feet (3.7 m) thick at the bottom of the dam. The upstream face was covered in stone cladding, while the outlet pipe ran through the bottom of the dam with a valve house on the downstream side.

Of the five reservoirs authorised, only Kentmere Head was built. By the time it was completed, the railways had reached Kendal, and coal from the Wigan coalfields was readily available. Steam engines began to replace water power, with Castle Mill installing a 100 hp (75 kW) engine in 1850. Wakefields, who operated the Sedgwick lower gunpowder mill on the east bank of the river moved their operations to Gatebeck on the Peasey Beck, which was supplied with compensation water from the Killington Reservoir, built to supply the Lancaster Canal. There was no enthusiasm to pay rates from the smaller mills, with even less to spend large amounts of money on new works, and so the Commissioners of the Kendal Reservoirs became the Commissioners of the Kentmere Reservoir.

=== Operation ===
There was a steady decline in the number of mills using water power. James Cropper & Company became the largest user when they opened a paper mill at Bowston in 1880, as they then owned a total fall of 51 feet (16 m). With the other large mills closing or turning to steam power, they became the only contributor to the Commissioners, and effectively owned the reservoir. They have funded the maintenance costs since then.

The Reservoirs (Safety Provisions) Act 1930 required reservoirs to be inspected, and the commissioners asked E. C. Oakes, the water engineer from Preston Corporation to carry out their assessment in 1933. He reported that there was some subsidence, there were leaks in the clay core and at least one of the 24-inch (610 mm) outlet pipes through the dam was broken. Repairs were carried out, with all of the outlet pipes being renewed, and as the valve in the valve house was no longer operational, a new valve was installed on the upstream side of the dam, with control rods running up the stone cladding of the dam to a control wheel on its crest.

One unexpected consequence of moving the control valve to the upstream side of the dam was that the rectangular culvert which carried water between the reservoir and the original cut-off valve well, near the core of the dam, was now pressurised in a way for which it had not been designed, and the entrance to the culvert collapsed in 1964. A repair was made by welding oil drums together to form a circular tube, and then grouting the gap around the outside of the tube with concrete, to form a circular concrete pipe. As the steel drums corroded away, it became clear that not all the voids had been filled, and further grouting was carried out in 1977. In the 120 years since its construction, the clay core had consolidated, lowering its top to a point where water could soak through the fill above it, which might cause slippage of the downstream face of the dam. Rather than restoring the core to its former level, a new spillway was cut into the existing spillway. It was 45 feet (14 m) long, and lowered the maximum water level by 3.5 feet (1.1 m). This reduced the storage capacity from 280 million imperial gallons (1,300 Ml) to 220 million imperial gallons (1,000 Ml).

By 1970 there were just five mills operational on the Kent. The Water Resources Act 1963 established 27 river authorities to replace the 32 river boards existing at that time. The Kent was within the jurisdiction of the Lancashire River Authority, and section 58 of the act gave them powers to charge mills for each thousand gallons abstracted from a river for the generation of power, even though the water was returned to the river a little further downstream. This effectively killed the use of water power, and Croppers, who used water to drive turbines which generated electricity to power their mill at Burneside, could no longer afford the cost, and the turbines were shut down in 1972.

As the effective owner of the reservoir, Croppers have made various attempts to dispose of the reservoir. An approach was made to the Lakes and Lune Water Board in 1972 or 1973, to see whether they could use the facility for water supply, but they were not prepared to do so. In 1995, having failed to interest either North West Water or the National Rivers Authority (NRA) in taking it over, they offered to give the reservoir to any new owner for free in return for their paying for repairs totalling £100,000 plus annual maintenance of over £2,000. No buyers came forward and Croppers remain the de facto owners of the reservoir.

In 1995, the supervising engineer for the reservoir expressed concern at the volume of water emerging at the outlet, which was thought to be caused by leakage, as it could not be reduced by operating the outlet valve. Croppers agreed to bring the next statutory inspection forward by two years, and assembled documentation on the reservoir, which revealed a succession of problems starting soon after its construction. Major issues included raising of the embankment due to settlement in 1852, 1861 and 1926, rebuilding of the bywash in 1864 after it failed, and lowering of the overflow weir by 1 foot (0.30 m) in 1926. The statutory inspection took place in May 1995, which involved CCTV inspection of the culvert after the reservoir had been drained. There were significant problems with the culvert through the upstream bank, and the inspector would not sanction refilling the reservoir. Possible options were breaching the embankment, reducing the volume of water stored to below 880 thousand cubic feet (25,000 m^{3}) so that the reservoir was no longer subject to the provisions of the Reservoirs Act 1975, or carrying out immediate repairs.

Because the reservoir is located in the Lake District National Park, there was public outcry at the thought of breaching the dam, with its effect on an area of natural beauty, while reducing the capacity of the reservoir would have been almost as contentious, and so was discounted. Although Croppers did not use the water from the reservoir, they decided to carry out repairs, which consisted of grouting of the foundations and crest of the dam; insertion of a liner into the scour pipe and a CCTV survey to prove its effectiveness; building a wall along the crest of the dam to prevent wave action damaging the downstream slope; removing silt from the tunnel through the downstream embankment; and grouting the spillway. A contract worth £100,125 was awarded to Askan Construction of Lancaster, with work commencing in August 1996. The liner consisted of a 16-inch (400 mm) diameter HDPE pipe manufactured by Stewarts and Lloyds Plastic, and butt welded on site. Once all issues had been remedied, the reservoir was filled slowly, using the outlet valve to prevent water levels rising too fast. As a result of the work, the reservoir then met modern standards, and was expected to remain in good condition for several decades. The work carried out to the dam was gratefully acknowledged by Kentmere Parish meeting in a letter sent to James Cropper.

== Physical features and location ==
The reservoir is built in an area where the underlying rocks are low-grade metamorphic, similar to slate, or volcanic. These are covered by a wide layer of slates and grits of Silurian age, which are more or less impermeable. The reservoir dam wall is 832 feet (254 m) long at its crest with a stepped weir type overflow at the western end, and there is a lower outlet for the River Kent in the middle of the dam wall. The reservoir's location is quiet and secluded, surrounded by the fells of Yoke, Froswick, Ill Bell, Thornthwaite Crag, Harter Fell, Mardale Ill Bell and Kentmere Pike. These fells, which make up the Kentmere horseshoe walk around the head and flanks of the Kentmere valley, throw down steep slopes to the shore and give fine views of the reservoir.

== Bibliography ==
- Binnie, G M (1981). Early Victorian Water Engineers. Thomas Telford. ISBN 978-0-7277-0128-2.
- CAMS (March 2004). "The Kent Catchment Abstraction Management Strategy" (PDF). Environment Agency. Archived from the original (PDF) on 27 September 2007.
- Garner, Clare (9 October 1995). "Unwanted reservoir offers Lakeland idyll". The Independent. Archived from the original on 27 April 2019.
- Hughes, AK (1998). "Kentmere—past, present and future mining subsidence". The Prospect for Reservoirs in the 21st Century. British Dam Society (ICE). ISBN 9780727727046.
- Johnston, I W. "A Brief History of Kentmere" (PDF). kentmere.org. Archived (PDF) from the original on 28 April 2019.
- Wilson, Paul N (1973). "Kendal Reservoirs" (PDF). Archaeology Data Service. Archived (PDF) from the original on 28 April 2019.
