= Trout Beck =

Stream in Cumbria, England

Coordinates: 54.4128°N 2.9115°W

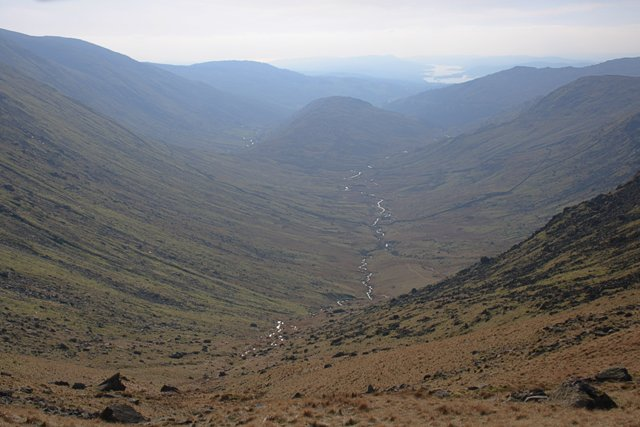
- Trout Beck from Thresthwaite Mouth

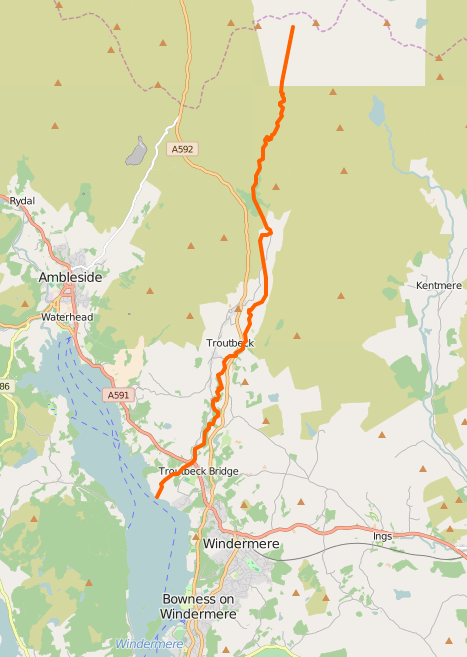
- Trout Beck, highlighted in orange, in OpenStreetMap

Location
- Country: England
- County: Cumbria
- Villages: Troutbeck, Troutbeck Bridge

Physical characteristics
- Source: Stony Cove Pike
  - location: Cumbria
  - elevation: 1,970 ft (600 m)
- Mouth: Windermere
  - location: Calgarth, Cumbria
  - elevation: 128 ft (39 m)
- Length: 8.3 mi (13.4 km)

The Trout Beck is a fast flowing stream of the Lake District in North West England. It is one of the main sources of replenishment for Windermere, and is part of the Leven catchment. Its name comes from Old Norse and appears in documents from 1292 as Trutebyk. The river rises between the peaks of Stony Cove Pike and Thornthwaite Crag in the High Street range, at a height of about 1,970 feet (600 m).

Several tributaries flowing from the crags to the west of the High Street Roman road combine to form the young Trout Beck. The river descends rapidly, more or less in a southerly direction, through Troutbeck Park and to the west of Troutbeck Tongue. At a height of about 650 feet (200 m) the Woundale Beck, draining the eastern flanks of Broad End and Pike How, is subsumed. The engorged Trout Beck then skirts Hird Wood on its eastern side before subsuming Hagg Gill at the 460 feet (140 m) contour. This latter tributary drains the fells around the course of the old Roman road.

The river passes under Ing Bridge as it continues in a southerly direction down the Troutbeck valley through the tranquil fields of the valley bottom. The hamlets of Town Head and High Green are just to the west of the river as it enters Limefitt Park. On emerging from Limefitt the river is bridged by the A592 Kirkstone Pass road. Troutbeck village lies on the west side of the valley. Continuing through a narrow area of mixed woodland the river eventually reaches the A591 road at Troutbeck Bridge near the town of Windermere. After less than a mile (2 km) the river enters Windermere on its eastern shore at a point close to Calgarth Hall.

From its source the Trout Beck descends some 1,840 feet (560 m) in a distance of about seven miles (11 km). The river is a trout fishery where brown trout can be caught. Anglers should enquire locally about licences (an Environment Agency Rod Licence is required).

The Trout Beck is wholly within the historic county of Westmorland, and since 1974, has also been in the administrative county of Cumbria.

== See also ==
- Cunsey Beck
- River Leven
- River Brathay
- River Rothay
