= Troutbeck Tongue =

Fell in the Lake District, Cumbria, England

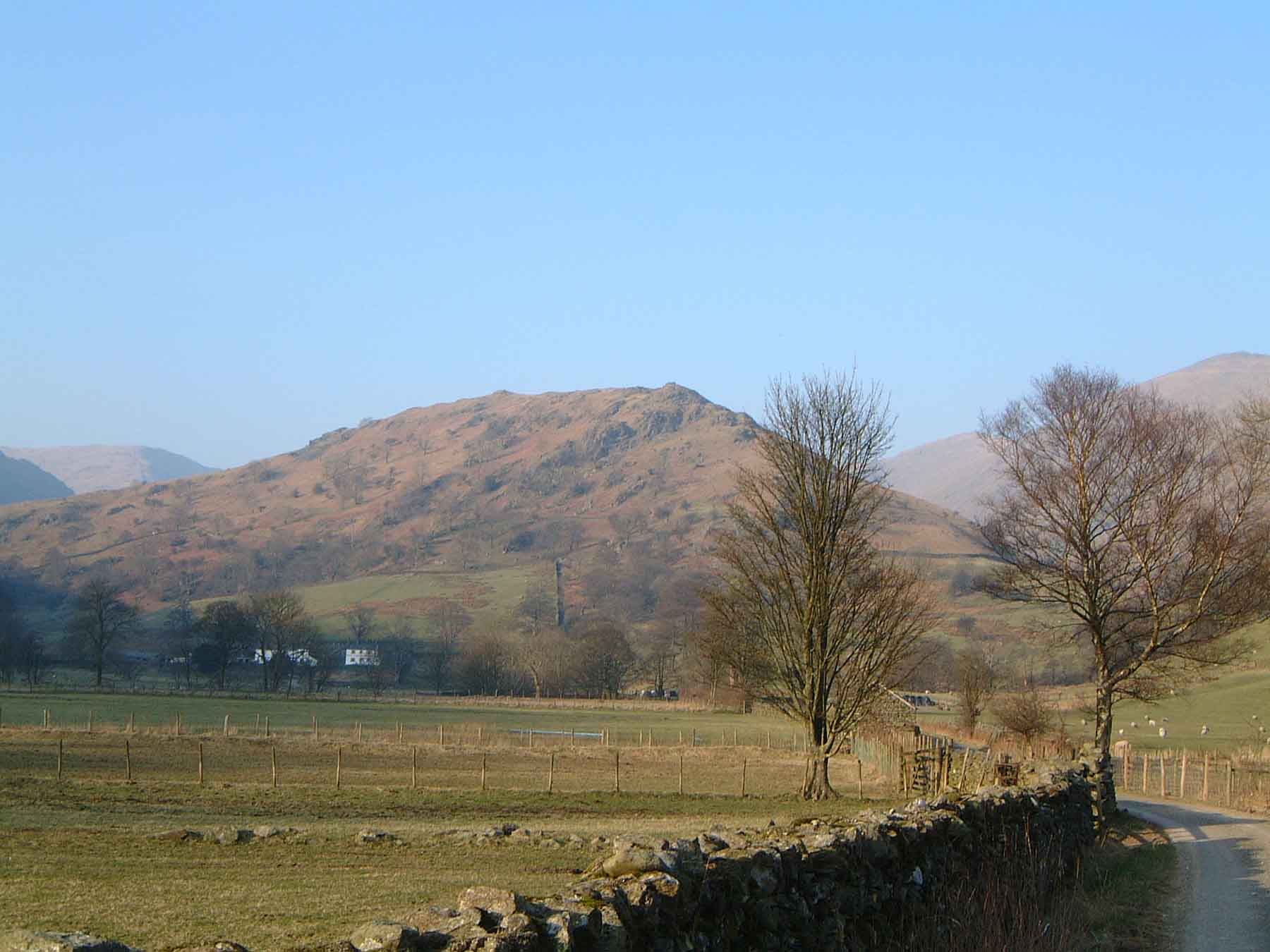
- Troutbeck Tongue as seen from the approach along Ing Lane

Highest point
- Elevation: 364 m (1,194 ft)
- Prominence: c.70 m
- Parent peak: Froswick
- Listing: Wainwright
- Coordinates: 54°26′59″N 2°53′34″W

Geography
- Location within the Lake District
- Location: Cumbria, England
- Parent range: Lake District, Far Eastern Fells
- OS grid: NY422064
- Topo map: OS Explorer OL7

Troutbeck Tongue is a small fell in the English Lake District, three miles (five kilometres) ENE of Ambleside. It is one of 214 hills listed in Alfred Wainwright's Pictorial Guides to the Lakeland Fells, making it a popular attraction for walkers aiming to complete the "Wainwrights". Its moderate height and proximity to a main road mean it is a pleasant half-day excursion that can be done when the higher fells are in cloud.

== Topography ==
Troutbeck Tongue branches off south-westward from the main Ill Bell ridge, just north of Froswick. It separates Trout Beck from Hagg Gill, its main upper tributary. These two streams almost reconverge behind the fell, the col connecting to Froswick being at only 968 feet (295 m). This depression carries a number of ancient cairns at the base of the long grassy back-slope of the fell. The character of this side is in marked contrast to the southern tip of the fell, which drops steeply over rocky outcrops to Troutbeck Park.

== Ascents ==
The fell is usually climbed from the village of Troutbeck on the A592 road three miles (five kilometres) north of the town of Windermere. From the village it is a pleasant walk to the base of the fell, following the course of the Trout Beck along Ing Lane which leads to Troutbeck Park Farm. This 1,900 acre (7.7 km^{2}) sheep farm was bought by the children's book author and illustrator Beatrix Potter in 1923; it was in danger of development and so she decided to purchase it. When she died in 1943, she left the farm and its land to the National Trust, along with 13 other farms she owned in the Lake District.

The ascent of the fell begins at the farm. It is quite a steep climb with several rocky outcrops and walls and fences to negotiate, but the modest height of the fell makes it a short ascent of less than 30 minutes. There is some evidence of quarrying near the top of the fell, and this is marked on the Ordnance Survey map.

== Summit ==
The summit is grassy with views restricted by the surrounding higher fells. However, there is a good view due south down the Troutbeck valley with England's largest lake, Windermere, well seen.
