= Townend =

Historic house in Troutbeck, Cumbria, England

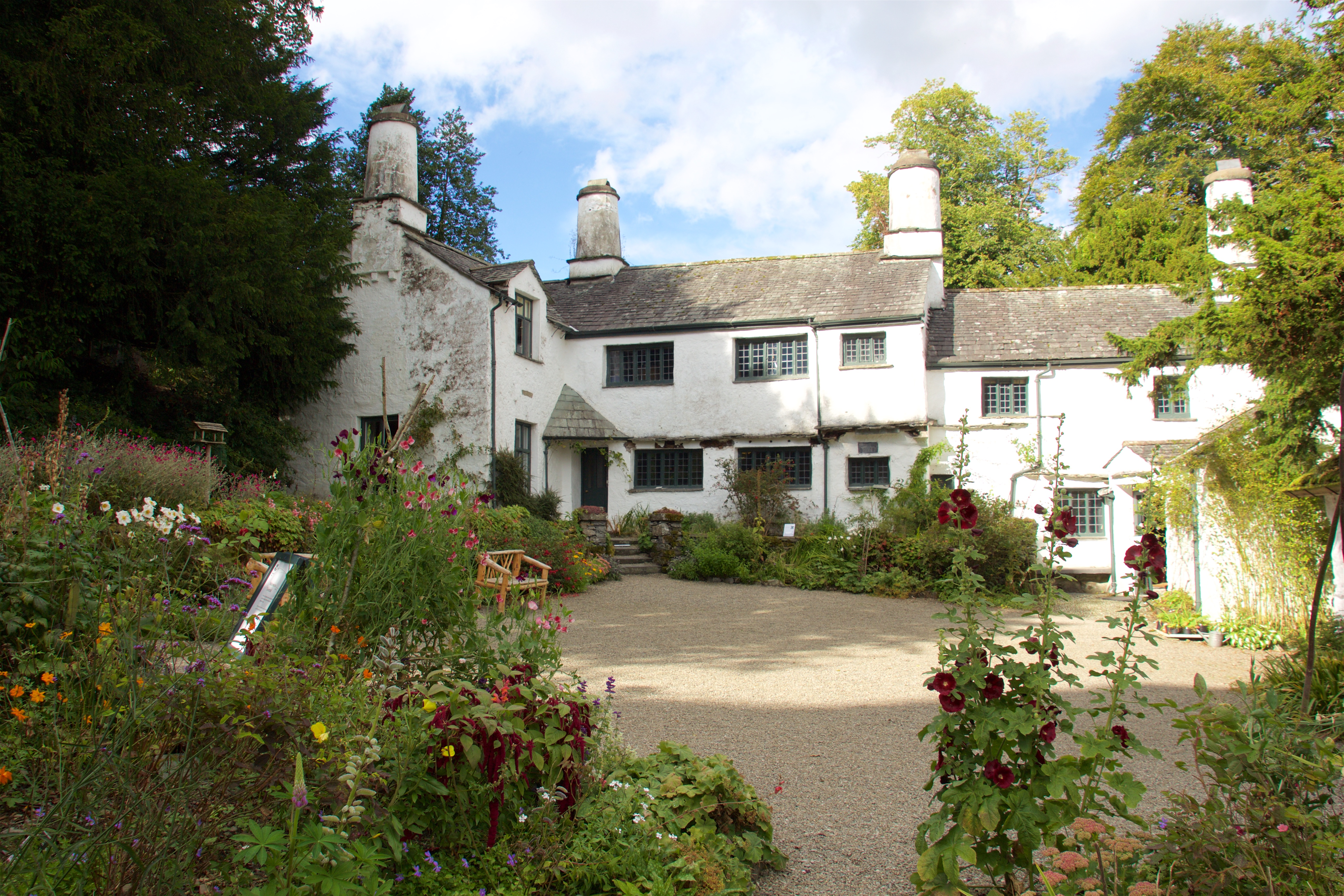
- Townend in 2015
- Interactive map of the Townend area

General information
- Coordinates: 54.4113°N 2.9151°W

Website
- www.nationaltrust.org.uk/townend/

Townend is a 17th-century house in Troutbeck, in the civil parish of Lakes, north of Windermere, Cumbria, England, and in the ownership of the National Trust. The house was donated to the Trust in 1948; prior to this it was the home of the Browne family, local farmers, for 400 years. Although not the sort of stately home usually associated with the National Trust, it provides an insight into the life of a reasonably wealthy farming family. It is a Grade I listed building.

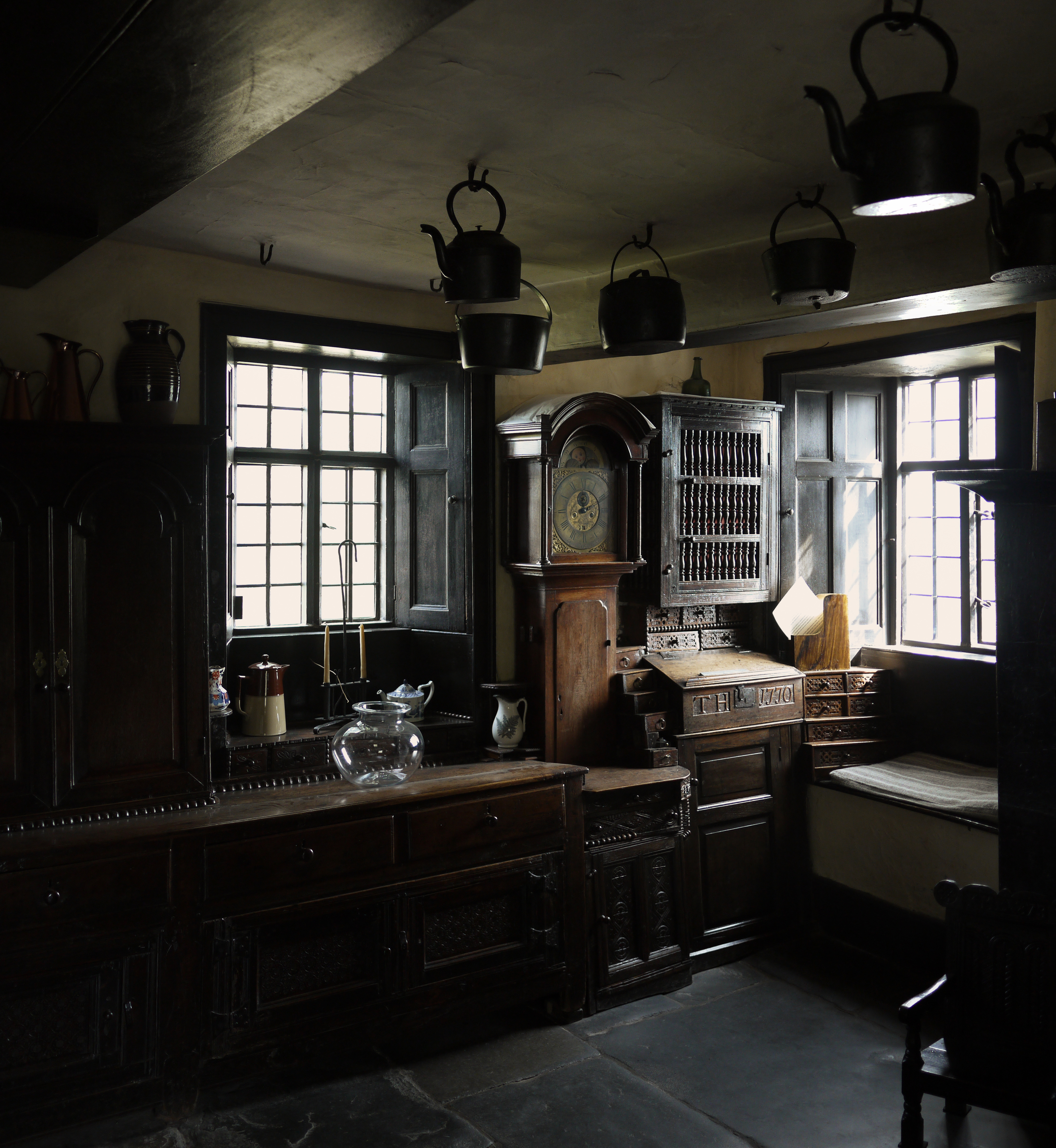
Inside the front room
