= Froswick =

Fell in the Lake District, Cumbria, England

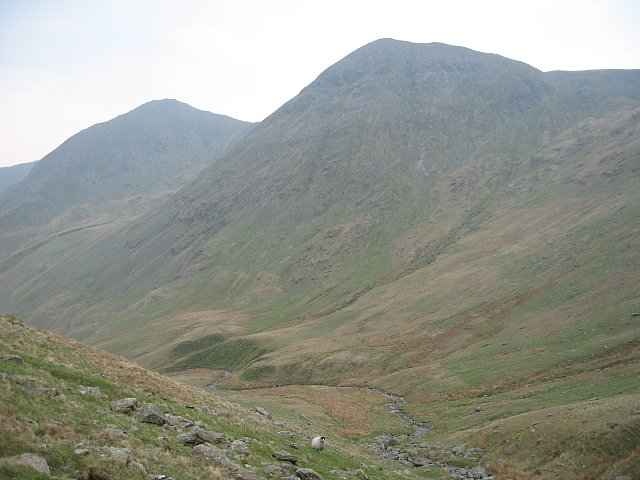
- Ill Bell and Froswick (on the right) from the upper valley of the River Kent

Highest point
- Elevation: 720 m (2,360 ft)
- Prominence: c. 75 m (245 ft)
- Parent peak: Ill Bell
- Listing: Wainwright, Nuttall, Hewitt
- Coordinates: 54°28′07″N 2°52′24″W

Geography
- Location within the Lake District
- Location: Cumbria, England
- Parent range: Lake District, Far Eastern Fells
- OS grid: NY435085
- Topo map: OS Explorer OL7

Froswick is a fell in the English Lake District, standing on the fine narrow ridge between the valleys of Kentmere and Troutbeck.

== Topography ==
To the north is Thornthwaite Crag, while the adjoining fell to the south is Ill Bell. Froswick is shorter in stature than either of its neighbours and also has no obvious route of direct ascent. For these reasons it is often seen merely as a stopping point on the Ill Bell ridge, or the longer Kentmere Horseshoe walk. Froswick also apes the form of Ill Bell to a surprising degree, particularly when the ridge is viewed in profile.

The western Troutbeck side is steep and smooth, except for the ravine of Blue Gill. This rends the fellside from top to bottom and is a feeder of Hagg Gill. The Kentmere flank is rougher and falls in fans of scree to the River Kent, just above Kentmere Reservoir.

Topographically, Froswick has one feature which Ill Bell lacks - a subsidiary ridge. Starting out southwards from halfway down the western side, a narrow wedge of high ground pushes out into the Troutbeck valley. Separating Trout Beck from its main tributary Hagg Gill, is the modest height of Troutbeck Tongue.

The ridges north and south from Froswick are both narrow and airy. Northwards a ruined fence is followed above the crags of Wander Scar, before the ridge broadens onto the summit plateau of Thornthwaite Crag. The transit to Ill Bell passes above Over Cove on the Kentmere side before commencing the rocky scramble to the summit. The impressive summit cairns of both neighbours are easily visible from Froswick.

== Roman road ==
In addition to the well-worn path along the ridge (and a detour which bypasses the Froswick summit to the west), the fell also carries the High Street Roman road on its western flank. This rises up the valley of Hagg Gill before crossing the ridge below Thornthwaite Crag and making a bee-line for its namesake fell. Climbing along a number of worn grooves in the fellside, the road is also known as Scot Rake.

== Summit ==
The summit of Froswick is small, but lacks the rockiness of Ill Bell. A small cairn sits on the grass. The view is limited by taller neighbours, but there is a good sight of the Scafells and Langdales.

== Ascents ==
Direct ascents can be made via Scot Rake or Blue Gill from Troutbeck. On the Kentmere side there are no pathed routes, but a tongue of grass to the north of the fell avoids the worst of the scree.
