= Lakes, Cumbria =

Coordinates: 54.430°N 3.010°W

Lakes
- Civil parish
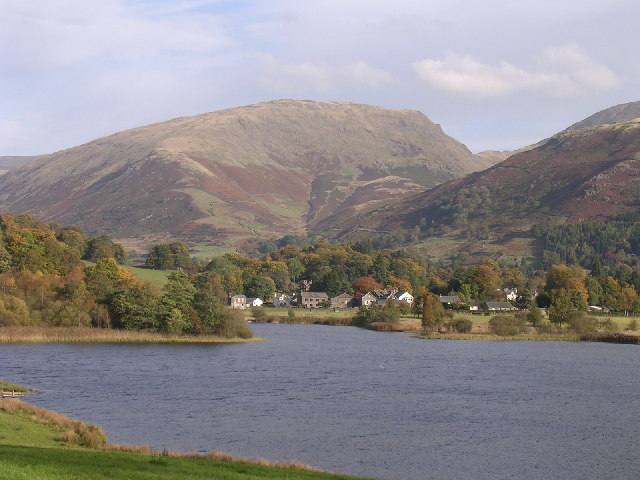
- Grasmere

- Location within Cumbria
- Population: 4,280 (Parish, 2021)
- OS grid reference: NY3704
- Civil parish: Lakes
- Ceremonial county: Cumbria
- Region: North West
- Country: England
- Sovereign state: United Kingdom
- Post town: AMBLESIDE
- Postcode district: LA22
- Post town: WINDERMERE
- Postcode district: LA23
- Dialling code: 01539
- Police: Cumbria
- Fire: Cumbria
- Ambulance: North West
- UK Parliament: Westmorland and Lonsdale

Lakes is a civil parish in the Westmorland and Furness district of Cumbria, England. It covers the town of Ambleside, and the villages and hamlets of Clappersgate, Rydal, Grasmere, Troutbeck, Chapel Stile, Elterwater, Little Langdale and Waterhead.

== History ==
The parish has its origins in an urban district called Lakes, which was created in 1935 covering the combined area of the former urban districts of Ambleside and Grasmere plus the civil parishes of Langdales, Patterdale, Rydal and Loughrigg, and Troutbeck. Ambleside was the largest settlement in the district and where the council was based. The urban district had an area of 49,917 acres (202.01 km^{2}).

Lakes Urban District was abolished in 1974. Patterdale was transferred to Eden District, and the remainder of the old Lakes Urban District became a successor parish called Lakes within the South Lakeland district of the new county of Cumbria. South Lakeland was in turn abolished in 2023 when the new Westmorland and Furness Council was created, also taking over the functions of the abolished Cumbria County Council in the area.

== Governance ==
There are two tiers of local government covering Lakes, at parish and unitary authority level: Lakes Parish Council and Westmorland and Furness Council. The parish council is based at Low Nook on Rydal Road in Ambleside, which forms part of the University of Cumbria's Ambleside campus.

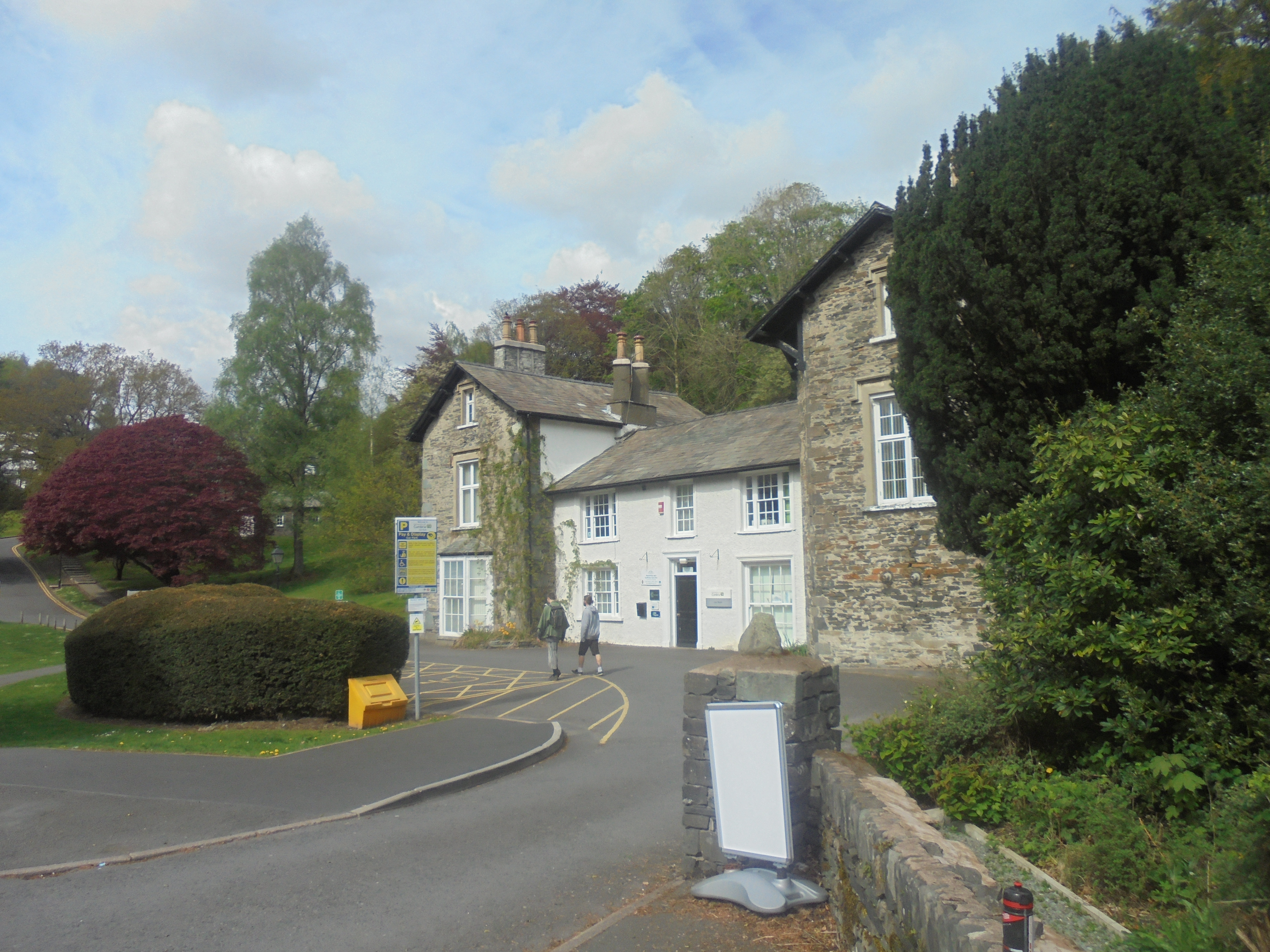
Low Nook, Rydal Road

The parish is wholly within the Lake District National Park, and so some functions are administered by the Lake District National Park Authority, notably planning. Lakes CP incorporates within its boundaries the wards of Ambleside, the Langdales, Rydal & Loughrigg, Grasmere and Troutbeck.

== Geography ==
The A591 road, a primary route, passes through the centre of the parish. It enters the parish from the south at the point where it crosses Trout Beck at Troutbeck Bridge village. After covering 16 km (10 mi) in road distance (13.4 km (8.5 mi) as the crow flies), it leaves the parish at Dunmail Raise. The A592 road passes through the eastern area of the parish. The col of the Kirkstone Pass, at a point approximately 200 m north of the Kirkstone Inn, marks the northern boundary of Lakes CP.

It is the area covered by the Kelsick Foundation, an organisation that helps locals with the costs of extra-curricular activities for children.

== Demography ==
At the 2021 census, the population of the parish was 4,280. The population had been 5,127 in the 2001 census, and 4,420 in the 2011 census.

== See also ==
- Listed buildings in Lakes, Cumbria
