= Mardale Ill Bell =

Mountain in Cumbria, England

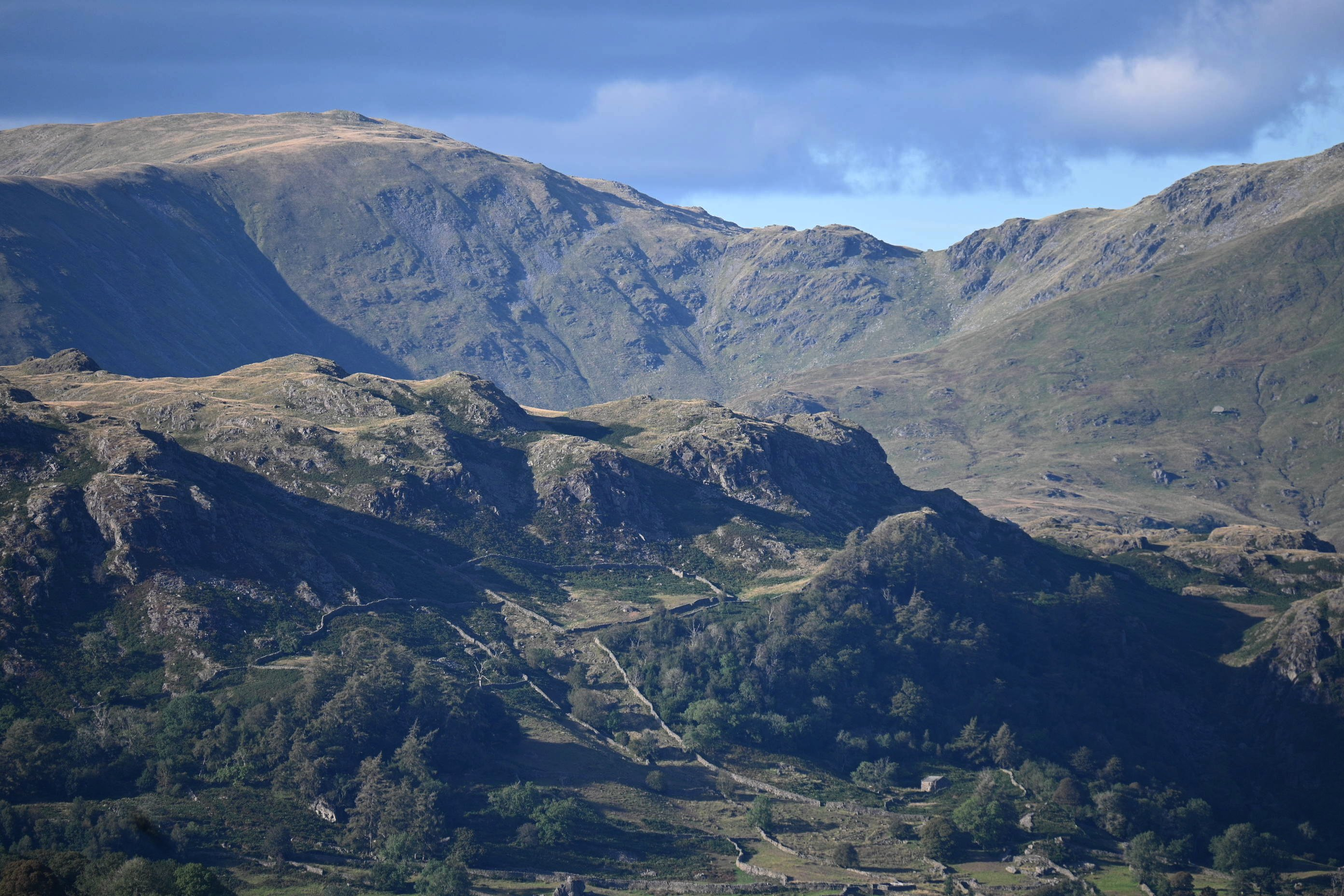
- Mardale Ill Bell (left) from Kentmere. Nan Bield Pass crosses the lowest point in the background ridge.

Highest point
- Elevation: 760 m (2,490 ft)
- Prominence: c. 14 m
- Parent peak: High Street
- Listing: Wainwright,
- Coordinates: 54°29′03″N 2°51′13″W

Geography
- Location within the Lake District
- Location: Cumbria, England
- Parent range: Lake District, Far Eastern Fells
- OS grid: NY448102
- Topo map: OS Explorer OL5, Explorer OL7

Mardale Ill Bell is a fell in the English Lake District, rising to the south west of Haweswater Reservoir. It stands on the watershed between Mardale and Kentmere and is the highpoint of the south-eastern ridge of High Street, midway on its course to Harter Fell.

== Topography ==
The head of the Kentmere valley lies to the south-west of the fell with rough slopes leading down over scree to Kentmere Reservoir. Mardale Ill Bell sends out a short grass-topped spur, Lingmell End, which splits the head of the valley into two.

The north-eastern face of Mardale Ill Bell forms the craggy backdrop to Blea Water. This perfect corrie tarn is the deepest in the Lake District at 207 feet (63 m). (Note: Blea water is the deepest tarn but its depth is exceeded by some large lakes such as Wastwater and Windermere.) Its outflow feeds Haweswater, joining with that of a second tarn, Small Water. Between the two, Mardale Ill Bell throws out the rocky spur of Piot Crag. Two tiers of crag drop down to the confluence at Mardale Waters.

South-east of the summit a rough narrowing ridge drops to Nan Bield Pass at 2,100 feet (640 m), before rising again over rocky steps to Harter Fell. Nan Bield was the ancient trading route between Kentmere and the now drowned village of Mardale Green, submerged by the raising of Haweswater in the 1940s. Near the shore of Small Water on the descending path are a number of stone shelters, pointers to the earlier importance of the pass. These each provide refuge for one person in extremis, entrance being via crawling.

North-west from Mardale Ill Bell the grassy ridge crosses a wet depression and then expands into a wide plateau, triangular in plan. High Street and Thornthwaite Crag are at the other two corners, with the Roman road crossing north to south.

== Summit ==
The summit has two large cairns on grass, the northern one being the top. The view westwards is confined by higher fells but the Ill Bell ridge and Coniston range are seen to good effect. Blea Water and Small Water can be brought into sight from the rim of the crags.

== Ascents ==
The most popular routes of ascent are on the Mardale side. From the road end Nan Bield pass can be used, or the impressive scenery of Piot Crag can be attained from the shore of either Blea or Small Water. From Kentmere, Nan Bield provides the obvious route, although a pathless climb up to the top of Lingmell End is possible.
