= Troutbeck Park =

Farm in Cumbria

Coordinates: 54.4433°N 2.8953°W

Troutbeck Park is a farm to the north of Troutbeck village in Westmorland and Furness, Cumbria. In 1923, there was a risk of it being sold for development, so Beatrix Potter bought it and kept it as a working farm. She bred Herdwick sheep there with the help of shepherd Tom Storey. When she died in 1943 she was president-elect of the Herdwick Sheep Breeders' Association, though she died before she could take up office.

It was one of the fourteen farms which Beatrix Potter left to the National Trust when she died.
