= Ill Bell =

Fell in the Lake District, Cumbria, England

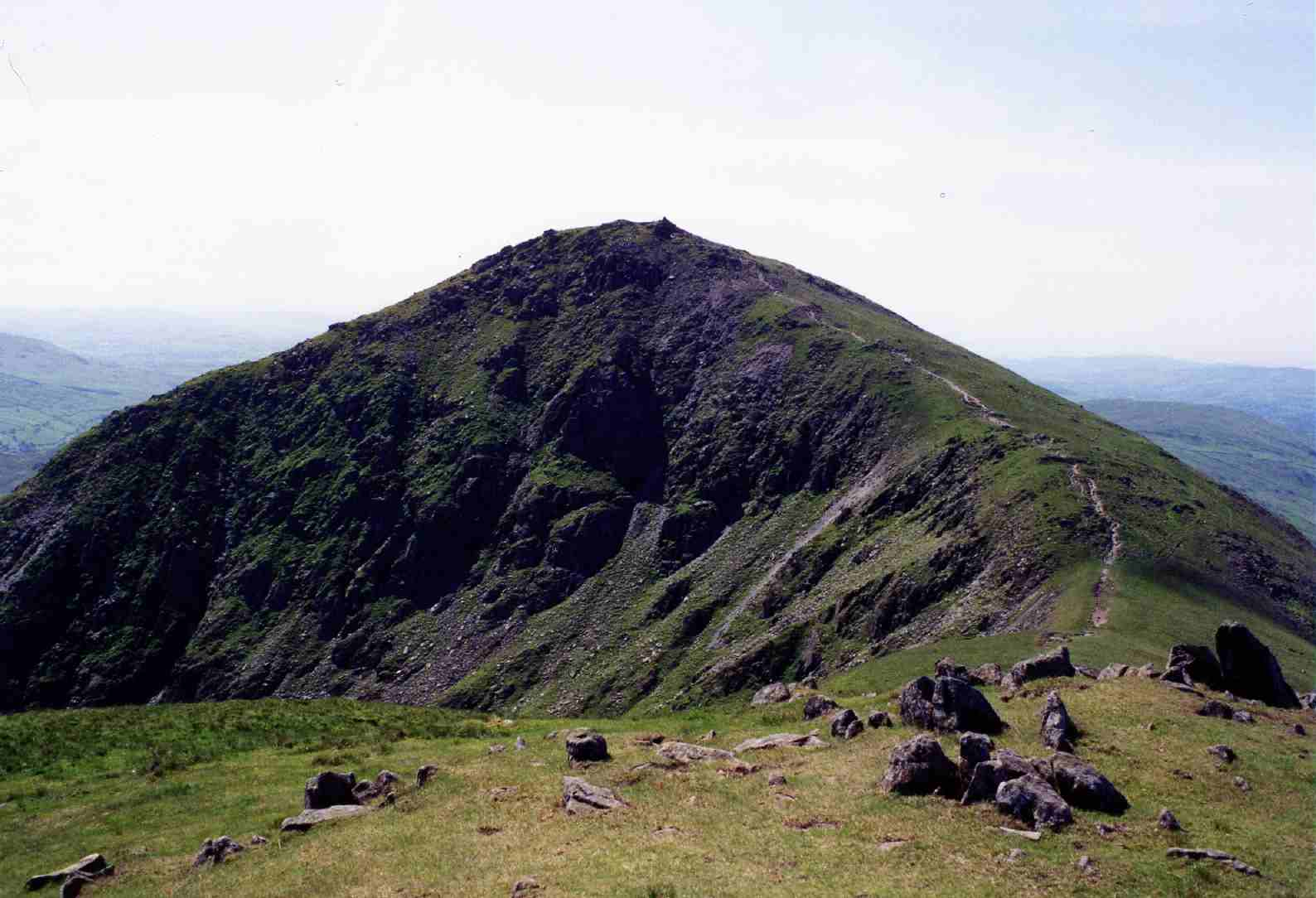
- Ill Bell from the neighbouring fell of Froswick

Highest point
- Elevation: 757 m (2,484 ft)
- Prominence: c. 124 m
- Parent peak: High Street
- Listing: Wainwright, Nuttall, Hewitt
- Coordinates: 54°27′45″N 2°52′18″W

Geography
- Location within the Lake District
- Location: Cumbria, England
- Parent range: Lake District, Far Eastern Fells
- OS grid: NY436078
- Topo map: OS Explorer OL7

Ill Bell is a fell in the English Lake District, in the county of Cumbria, standing on the narrow ridge between the valleys of Kentmere and Troutbeck.

== Topography ==
To the north is Froswick, a strikingly similar lesser copy, while the adjoining fell to the south is Yoke. Ill Bell appears from some directions to be a perfectly symmetrical bell-shaped peak, and 'Hill Bell' is one possible derivation of the name, quoted by Alfred Wainwright. With this form aped by Froswick, the ridge assumes an unmistakable 'roller-coaster' appearance when viewed in profile.

The western side is steep and relatively smooth, falling not direct to the Troutbeck valley but to its main tributary, Hagg Gill. The low top of Troutbeck Tongue stands between the two valleys. The eastern Kentmere flank is rougher and steeper, falling in a great tumble of scree to the shore of Kentmere Reservoir. There is the hint of a ridge to the north-east over Leads Howe. North and south of Ill Bell the Kentmere face is gouged out by Over and Rainsborrow Coves respectively. These features have created the narrow ridges to Froswick and Yoke.

== Ascents ==
The ridge is followed by a good path, and is the most usual route of ascent. Yoke and Ill Bell form the start of the popular Kentmere Horseshoe, returning ultimately down the ridge on the opposite side of Kentmere valley. The ridge is also commonly ascended from Troutbeck valley, via the Garburn Road. Direct ascents are also possible from the valley of Hagg Gill via the northernmost quarry, or striking up over Lead Howes from the reservoir in Kentmere.

== Summit ==
The top of Ill Bell is small, peaked, and unusually stony for the Far Eastern Fells. A number of columnar cairns have been built at the summit and at various points close by. These are big enough to enable easy recognition of the fell from a distance. The view of the Scafells is good and Ill Bell also gives a fine view of Windermere. All the fells making up the Kentmere Horseshoe can be seen clearly, while Cross Fell and the Dun Fells in the Pennines are in sight above Nan Bield Pass.
