= A592 road =

Road in the England Lake District

A592

Route information
- Length: 34 mi (55 km)

Major junctions
- North end: Penrith
- M6; A66 A5091 A591 A5074 A590
- South end: Newby Bridge

Location
- Country: United Kingdom
- Constituent country: England
- Primary destinations: Penrith; Windermere

Road network
- Roads in the United Kingdom; Motorways; A and B road zones

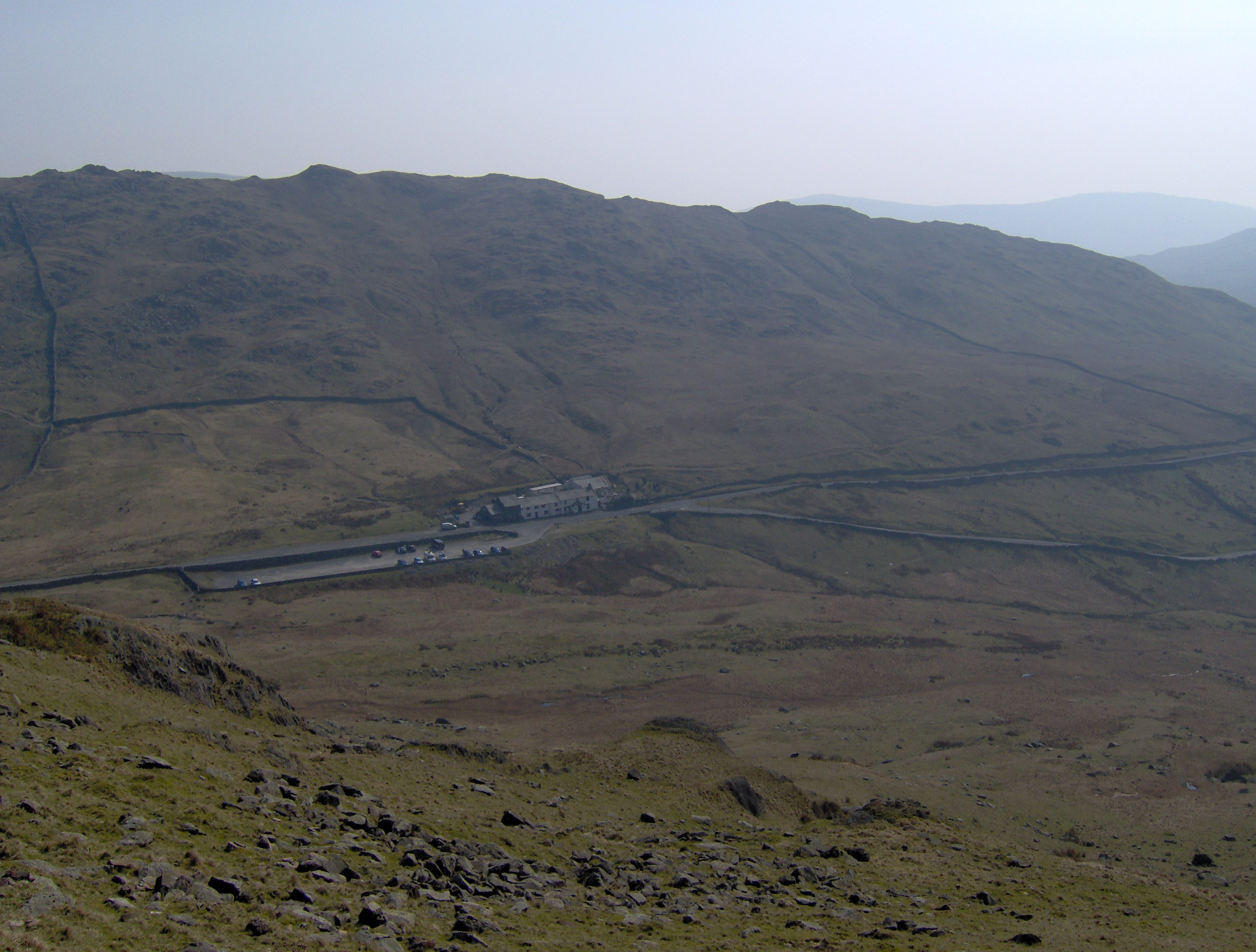
The A592 going over Kirkstone Pass

The A592 road is a major route running north–south through the English Lake District.

The road connects Penrith (54.6639°N 2.7524°W), and junction 40 of the M6 motorway), with Staveley at the southern tip of the lake, Windermere, (54.2672°N 2.9669°W), which is skirted by the A592 on its eastern bank; the road also follows the northern/western bank of Ullswater. It passes through Glenridding, Patterdale, the town of Windermere (where it crosses the A591 road), Bowness-on-Windermere and Storrs.

The total length is just under 34 miles (55 km), including a short concurrency with the A66 road to the west of the motorway junction.

The A592 crosses Kirkstone Pass with a summit at 454 metres (1,490 ft) and is frequently closed in winter.

The road over the Kirkstone Pass is currently closed on the southern side, due to a landslip above Troutbeck in November 2025. A spokesperson for Westmorland and Furness Council said it was unlikely that repair work on this stretch of road would commence before spring 2026, given the steepness of the land both immediately above and below the road, and the wet and icy weather common at this time of year.
