= Troutbeck, Lakes =

Village in Cumbria, England, near Windermere

Coordinates: 54.418°N 2.913°W

Troutbeck
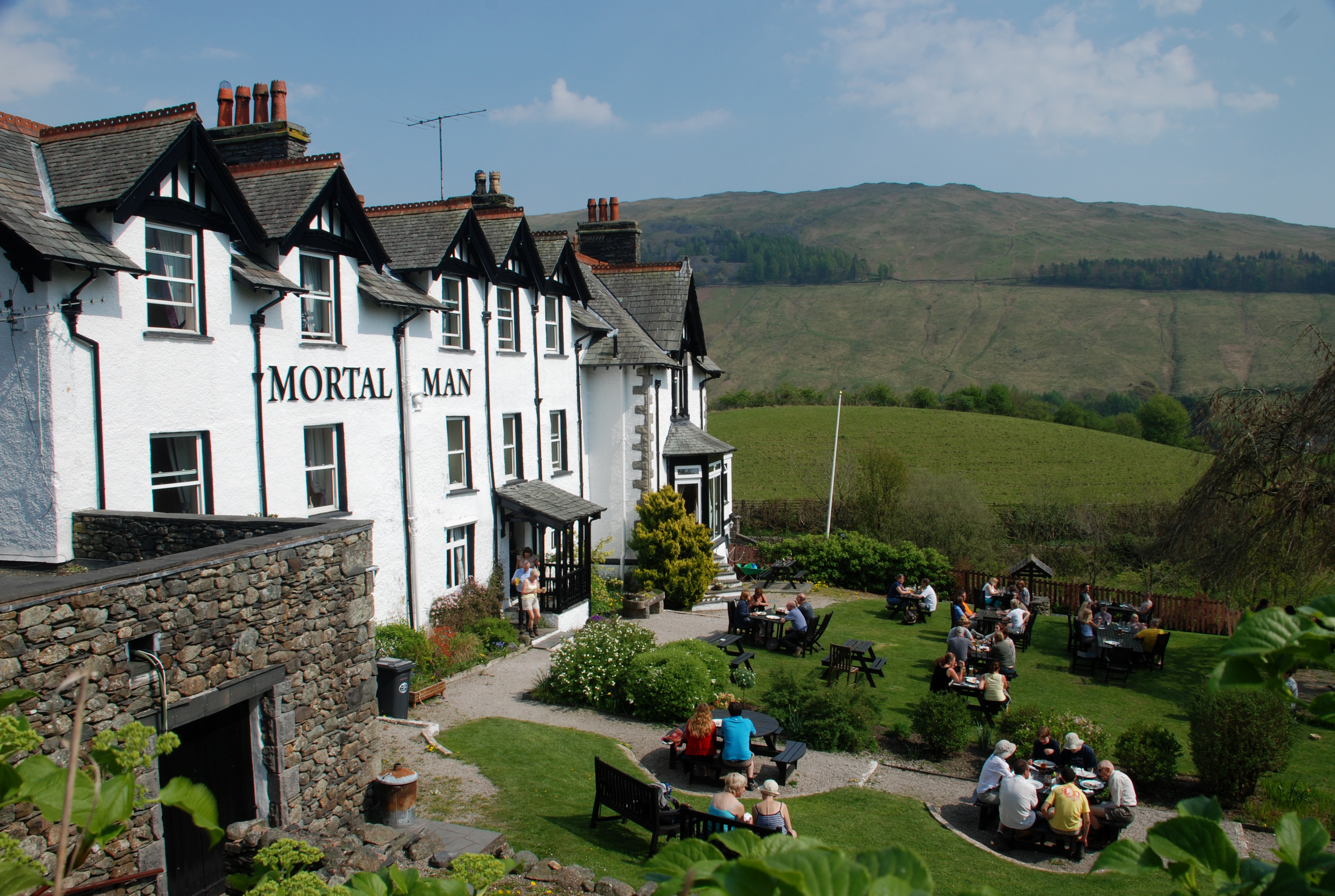
- The Mortal Man Inn public house, Troutbeck

- Location in South Lakeland Location within Cumbria
- OS grid reference: NY407030
- Civil parish: Lakes
- Unitary authority: Westmorland and Furness
- Ceremonial county: Cumbria
- Region: North West
- Country: England
- Sovereign state: United Kingdom
- Post town: WINDERMERE
- Postcode district: LA23
- Dialling code: 015394
- Police: Cumbria
- Fire: Cumbria
- Ambulance: North West
- UK Parliament: Westmorland and Lonsdale

Troutbeck is a village and former civil parish, now in the parish of Lakes, in Westmorland and Furness unitary authority in the ceremonial county of Cumbria, England. It is 3 miles (5 km) north of Windermere town, and west of the A592 road, in the valley of Trout Beck. It is a conservation area and includes the National Trust property of Townend. In 1961 the parish had a population of 592.

== Village amenities ==
- Post Office, General Store and Teashop (on main road through village)
- Village Institute (above Post Office)
- The Mortal Man Inn (on main road through village). Has the "Oh, Mortal Man" verse on the pub sale, with reference to Sally Birkett's Ale:

"O mortal man that lives by bread,
What is it makes thy nose so red?
Thou silly fool, that look'st so pale,
'Tis drinking Sally Birkett's ale."

- The Queen's Head Hotel (on A592, Kirkstone Pass Road)
- Jesus Church, with unusual Pre-Raphaelite stained glass
- Limefitt Caravan Park

== History ==
Troutbeck was formerly a township and chapelry in Windermere parish, from 1866 Troutbeck was a civil parish in its own right until it was abolished on 1 April 1974 to form Lakes.
