= Thornthwaite Crag =

Mountain in United Kingdom

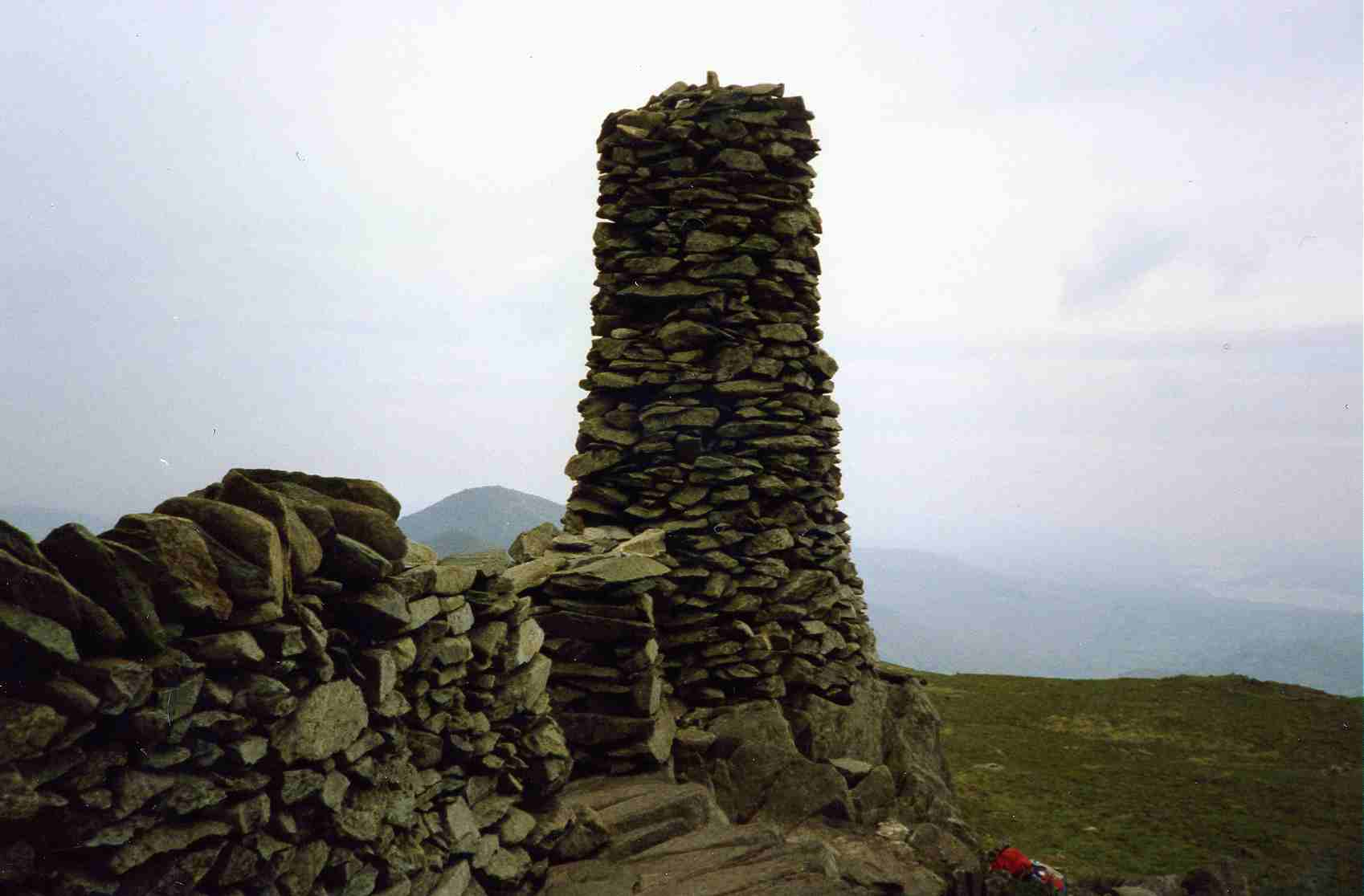
- Thornthwaite Crag’s 14-foot-high summit beacon with the fell of Froswick in the background.

Highest point
- Elevation: 784 m (2,572 ft)
- Prominence: c. 30 m
- Parent peak: High Street
- Listing: Wainwright, Nuttall, Hewitt
- Coordinates: 54°28′59″N 2°52′42″W

Geography
- Location within the Lake District
- Location: Cumbria, England
- Parent range: Lake District, Far Eastern Fells
- OS grid: NY432101
- Topo map: OS Explorer OL5, Explorer OL7

Thornthwaite Crag is a fell in the English Lake District, standing to the west of Haweswater Reservoir. It is a focal point of the Far Eastern Fells, standing at the head of several valleys.

== Topography ==
The summit area is broadly horseshoe-shaped, concave to the north with the head of Hayeswater Gill in the opening. The north-western horn of the shoe connects to Gray Crag and the north-eastern ridge to High Street and Mardale Ill Bell. Two other principal ridges run south to Froswick and west to Caudale Moor.

The north-eastern and southern ridges enclose the head of Kentmere with scree and crag predominating. To the south-west of Thornthwaite Crag is the craggy head of the long valley of Troutbeck, emptying into Windermere. Between the western and north-western ridges is the head of Pasture Beck, which ultimately joins Hayeswater Beck en route to Ullswater.

The western ridge to Caudale Moor is narrow and rough, dropping very steeply to the depression of Threshwaite Mouth at 1,950 feet (590 m). The other ridges are broad and grassy, although there is some marshy ground when crossing the depression toward High Street. The southern ridge narrows considerably before reaching Froswick.

== Summit ==
The grassy top is crossed by a stone wall which rises up from Threshwaite Mouth and then peters out a few hundred yards to the east of the summit. A section of old fenceposts then continues the boundary line toward High Street before again being replaced by stone wall. The actual top is marked by one of the most impressive columnar cairns in the district. Named Thornthwaite Beacon, it towers 14 feet (4.3 m) above an angle in the wall.

== Ascents ==
The High Street Roman road reaches the summit plateau along the south ridge, but then detours east around the actual top, making a bee-line for the fell bearing its name. All of the connecting ridges carry good paths from the summit, which is an important walkers’ crossroads. The view is good, particularly westwards, although it can be improved by moving to the edge of the plateau in various directions.

Thornthwaite Crag can be climbed direct from Hartsop via Pasture Beck and from Troutbeck via Scot Rake (the Roman road), or via Threshwaite Mouth. Various ascents from Kentmere are also possible.
