= Sergeant Man =

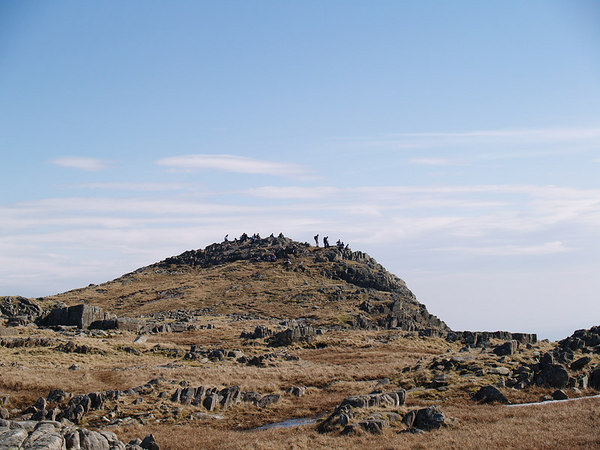
- Sergeant Man from High Raise (Langdale)

Highest point
- Elevation: 736 m (2,415 ft)
- Prominence: <10 m
- Parent peak: High Raise
- Listing: Wainwright
- Coordinates: 54°28′14″N 3°06′12″W

Geography
- Location within the Lake District
- Location: Cumbria, England
- Parent range: Lake District, Central Fells
- OS grid: NY286089
- Topo map: OS Explorer OL6

Sergeant Man is a fell in the English Lake District. It is properly a secondary summit of High Raise, but is given a separate chapter by Alfred Wainwright in his third Pictorial Guide nonetheless, as it "is so prominent an object and offers so compelling a challenge". Its rocky cone is indeed in great contrast to the grassy dome of High Raise.

== Topography ==
Sergeant Man lies a third of a mile to the south east of the parent fell and is the pivotal point for a complex system of ridges radiating eastward from High Raise. Sergeant Man is not actually visible from the peak of High Raise and Sergeant Man only comes into view as you gently descend from High Raise. South east, passing between Codale and Stickle Tarns is the broad spur leading to Blea Rigg, Silver How and Loughrigg. Sitting above Codale Tarn is the rocky subsidiary top of Codale Head — a grandchild of High Raise. From here further ridges run east to Tarn Crag and north east to Calf Crag and the circuit of Greenburn.

Steep ground falls away to the south of Sergeant Man, down to the valley of Bright Beck, this being the main feeder of Stickle Tarn. All water from this flank flows to Great Langdale. East of the summit between the Tarn Crag and Blea Rigg ridges, lie Codale Tarn and the headwaters of Easedale, streams bound for Grasmere. To the north of Sergeant Man are the upper gathering grounds of Wythburndale, which flow via Thirlmere to the sea at Workington.

== Ascents ==
The popular ways up Sergeant Man are either from Great Langdale via Stickle Tarn, or by a variety of routes from Grasmere village. These can take in the Blea Rigg, Tarn Crag or Calf Crag ridges, or ascend via Far Easedale or Easedale Tarn. The latter route takes the walker past Belles Knott, a striking feature near Codale Tarn. From below it appears as a sharp peak, etched against the skyline, but from above an easy grassy promenade is revealed behind.

== Summit ==
The area between Sergeant Man and Codale Head has a rash of small tarns, but the summit area is otherwise reasonably dry. The final cone is most easily climbed via a ridge on the northern side, and has good all round views except where obscured by High Raise.
