= Tarn Crag (Easedale) =

Fell in the Lake District, Cumbria, England

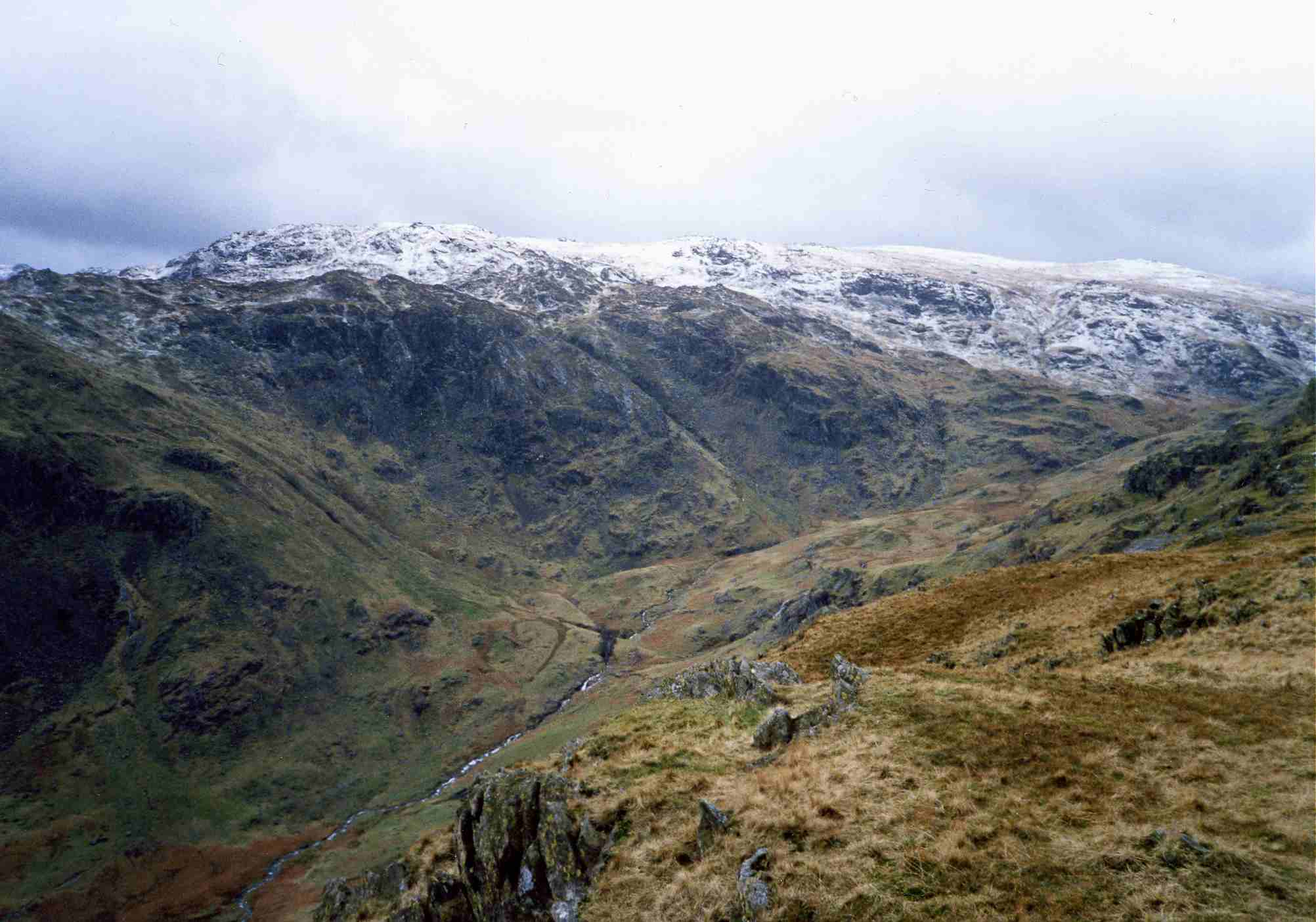
- Tarn Crag from Gibson Knott across Far Easedale

Highest point
- Elevation: 551 m (1,808 ft)
- Prominence: c. 5 m (15 ft)
- Parent peak: Codale Head
- Listing: Wainwright
- Coordinates: 54°28′23″N 3°04′34″W

Geography
- Location within the Lake District
- Location: Cumbria, England
- Parent range: Lake District, Central Fells
- OS grid: NY301093
- Topo map: OS Landranger 90

Tarn Crag is a fell in the Central Fells of the English Lake District. Strictly the name refers only to the rock face looking down upon Easedale Tarn, but Alfred Wainwright applied it to the entire ridge lying between the Easedale and Far Easedale valleys in his Pictorial Guide to the Lakeland Fells

== Topography ==
The spine of the Central Fells runs north from High Raise, forming the watershed between Thirlmere and Borrowdale. A number of lesser ridges radiate out eastwards from High Raise, centred upon the subsidiary top of Sergeant Man. One of these runs between the valleys of Far Easedale and Easedale, terminating at their confluence above Grasmere village.

The ridge is narrow to the east of the summit, rising over a series of knolls between the gradually diverging valleys. Westward it broadens considerably, swinging southward around the head of Codale Tarn before becoming indistinct in the general rising ground towards Sergeant Man and the High Raise massif. Codale Tarn is a shallow pool, its original outlet blocked by a moraine so that it now overflows via a rock lip.

The southern flank of the fell comprises Tarn and Greathead Crags, the backdrop to the popular picnic spot of Easedale Tarn. Much larger than Codale, this tarn is around 70 ft (20 m) deep and contains perch, eel and trout. Across the tarn are the crags of Blea Rigg. On the northern side of the ridge Deer Bields Crag broods over Far Easedale, with Calf Crag beyond.

== Geology ==
The summit area is composed of the dacitic welded lapilli tuff and volcaniclastic sandstone of the Lincomb Tarns Formation. The southern crags reveal andesite sills and the pebbly sandstone and breccia of the Pavey Ark Member.

== Summit ==
The highest point is a peaked outcrop, topped by a small cairn. The views eastward are extensive and Easedale Tarn can be brought into view from a subsidiary top to the south.

== Ascents ==
Tarn Crag is generally climbed from Grasmere via its eastern ridge, where a path winds among the rocks. This can be reached from Easedale Tarn, the top of the Sour Milk Gill cascades, or from Stythwaite Steps in Far Easedale. Ascents from the base of Deer Bield Crag or via Codale Tarn are also possible, although pathless.
