= Allan Bank =

House, built 1805, in Cumbria, England

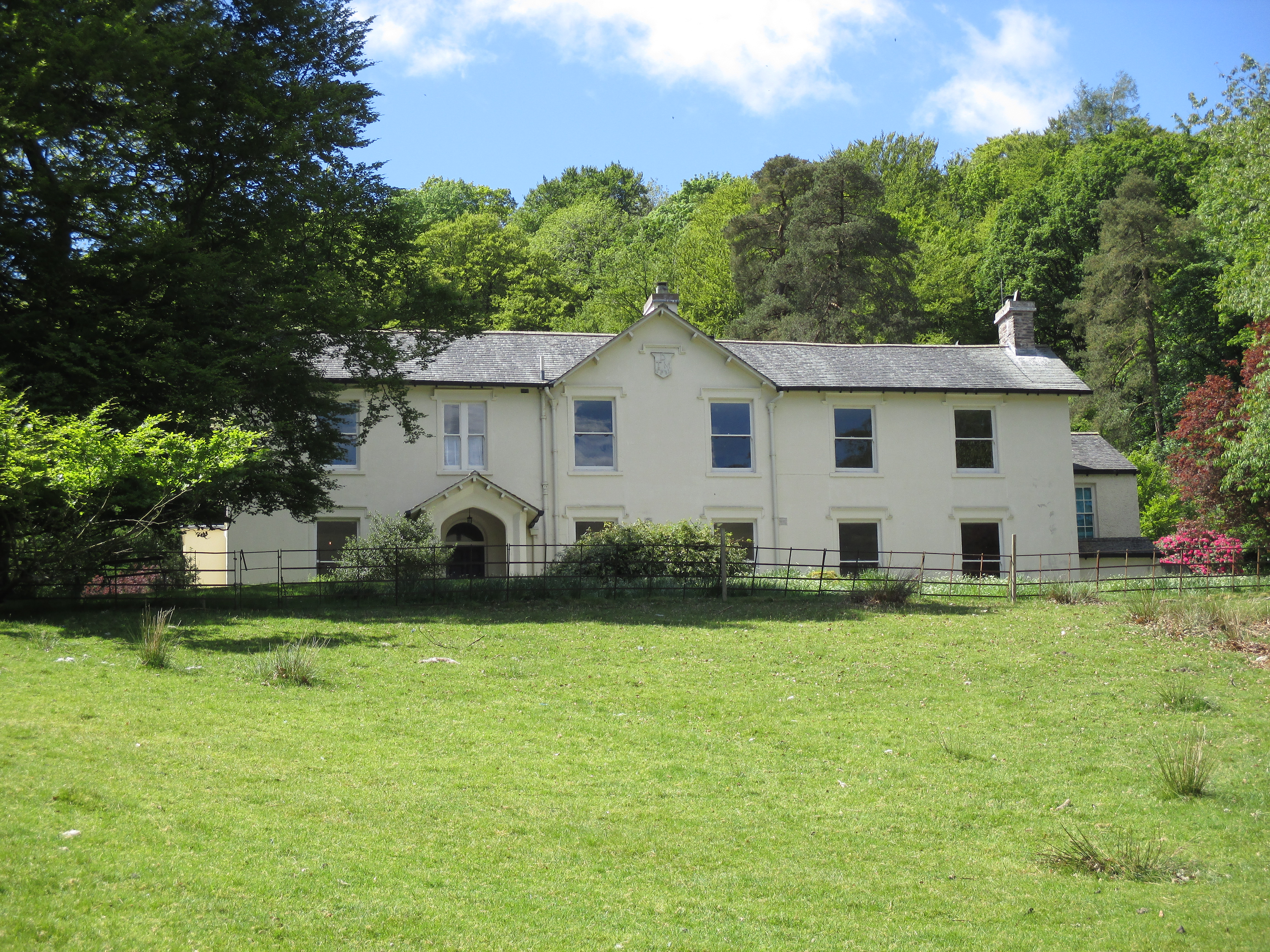

- Location within Cumbria
- 54°27′36″N 3°1′46″W

History
- Built: 1805

Site notes
- Owner: National Trust

Listed Building – Grade II*

Allan Bank is a grade II listed two-storey villa standing on high ground slightly to the west of Grasmere village in the heart of the Lake District. It is best known for being from 1808 to 1811 the home of William Wordsworth, but it was also occupied at various times by Dorothy Wordsworth, Dora Wordsworth, Thomas De Quincey, Samuel Taylor Coleridge, Thomas Arnold, Matthew Arnold and Canon Hardwicke Rawnsley, a co-founder of The National Trust. It is now owned by the National Trust and is open to the public.

== Construction ==
Allan Bank is designed in a "bleakly Italianate" style according to Pevsner, faced with scored stucco and roofed with slate; it has been described as "large, though not handsome". It was originally built by a Liverpool lawyer, John Gregory Crump, in 1805, and on its partial collapse the following year was rebuilt by him. An extension was added in 1834, perhaps designed by George Webster.

== Wordsworth's tenancy ==
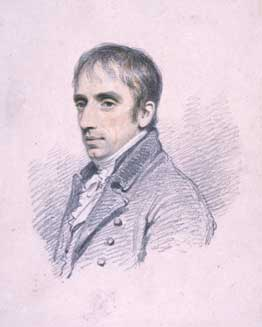
Wordsworth in about 1807, when he took on Allan Bank

Initially Wordsworth, who was then living less than a mile away in Dove Cottage, was outraged by the building of Allan Bank. In a letter to Richard Sharp he called it a "temple of abomination", and told him that "the house will stare you in the face from every part of the Vale [of Grasmere] and entirely destroy its character of simplicity and seclusion". He soon had to overcome his objections however, since Dove Cottage was far too small for his growing family, and Allan Bank was the only large house in Grasmere he could rent. There he would have enough room for all his household, as well as guests, and his children would be able to play on the slopes of Silver How and the banks of Grasmere lake. He accordingly took up the tenancy in the summer of 1807 with the intention of moving in some time during the autumn, though in the event this was delayed until the end of May 1808. "We already feel the comfort of having each a room of our own", wrote his sister Dorothy Wordsworth in June, but as the year drew on the Wordsworths began to change their minds as they realized that on windy days the various chimneys smoked appallingly. Dorothy called the house "literally not habitable", and complained that "dishes are washed, and no sooner set in the pantry then they are covered with smoke". On one stormy day, she wrote, "we could have no fire but in my Brother's Study – and that chimney smoked so much that we were obliged to go to bed with the Baby in the middle of the day to keep it warm, and I, with a candle in my hand, stumbled over a chair, unable to see it". Workmen were periodically brought in to tackle the chimney problem but their many attempts did not produce a full solution. In the midst of these difficulties the Wordsworths entertained Thomas De Quincey on a visit that lasted for three months, and Samuel Taylor Coleridge moved in with the intention of making his permanent home with the Wordsworths, though after two fraught years he left for Robert Southey's home in Keswick.

By the beginning of 1810 they were looking for another house, and in May they decided to transfer themselves to the old parsonage in the centre of Grasmere just as soon as it had been refurbished. Dorothy immediately began to regret the impending loss of their wonderful views of Grasmere and Easedale, and declared the place "sweeter than paradise itself". After a further year had passed, and without the planned improvements to the parsonage having been made, they moved in June 1811, leaving Allan Bank to their landlord Mr. Crump. During the Allan Bank years Wordsworth had written The Convention of Cintra, the first version of the Guide to the Lakes and most of The Excursion, and revised The White Doe of Rylstone, while Coleridge produced his journal The Friend.

== Later owners ==
Thereafter Crump sometimes lived at Allan Bank himself, sometimes let it out to tenants, until it fell into other hands in 1831. The educator and historian Thomas Arnold and his family spent the summer of 1833 there while their new house at nearby Fox How was being built; he worked on part of his History of Rome there, and boasted to a friend of the inspiring quality of the view from his window as he wrote. One Thomas Dawson owned the house from 1834 till his death in 1894, sometimes taking short-term tenants, and it continued in his family until 1911. In 1915 it was bought by Canon Rawnsley, one of the co-founders of the National Trust, and he moved into it on his retirement in 1917. He died there on 28 May 1920, leaving Allan Bank to the National Trust, though securing a lifetime's tenancy for his widow Eleanor Foster Simpson. She remained until her death in 1959. In the 1950s a fire destroyed a large wing at the rear of the house, and a second fire in 2011 did further serious damage, ending the 32 year tenancy of the Hunt Family, who threw some legendary parties in the 90's. The National Trust thereupon began long-term restoration work, and in March 2012 opened Allan Bank to the public for the first time. In June 2017 they were describing the house as "still very much a work in progress".

In October 2021, the building was one of 142 sites across England to receive part of a £35-million injection into the government's Culture Recovery Fund.

== Red squirrels ==
Cumbria is one of the few remaining habitats in England of the red squirrel, and the grounds of Allan Bank are known as a place where they are especially commonly seen. They are encouraged by the National Trust staff there, who claim to spend £900 a year on feed, and by the Grasmere Red Squirrel Group. There is a sculpture of a red squirrel in the gardens.
