= Steel Fell =

Hill in England

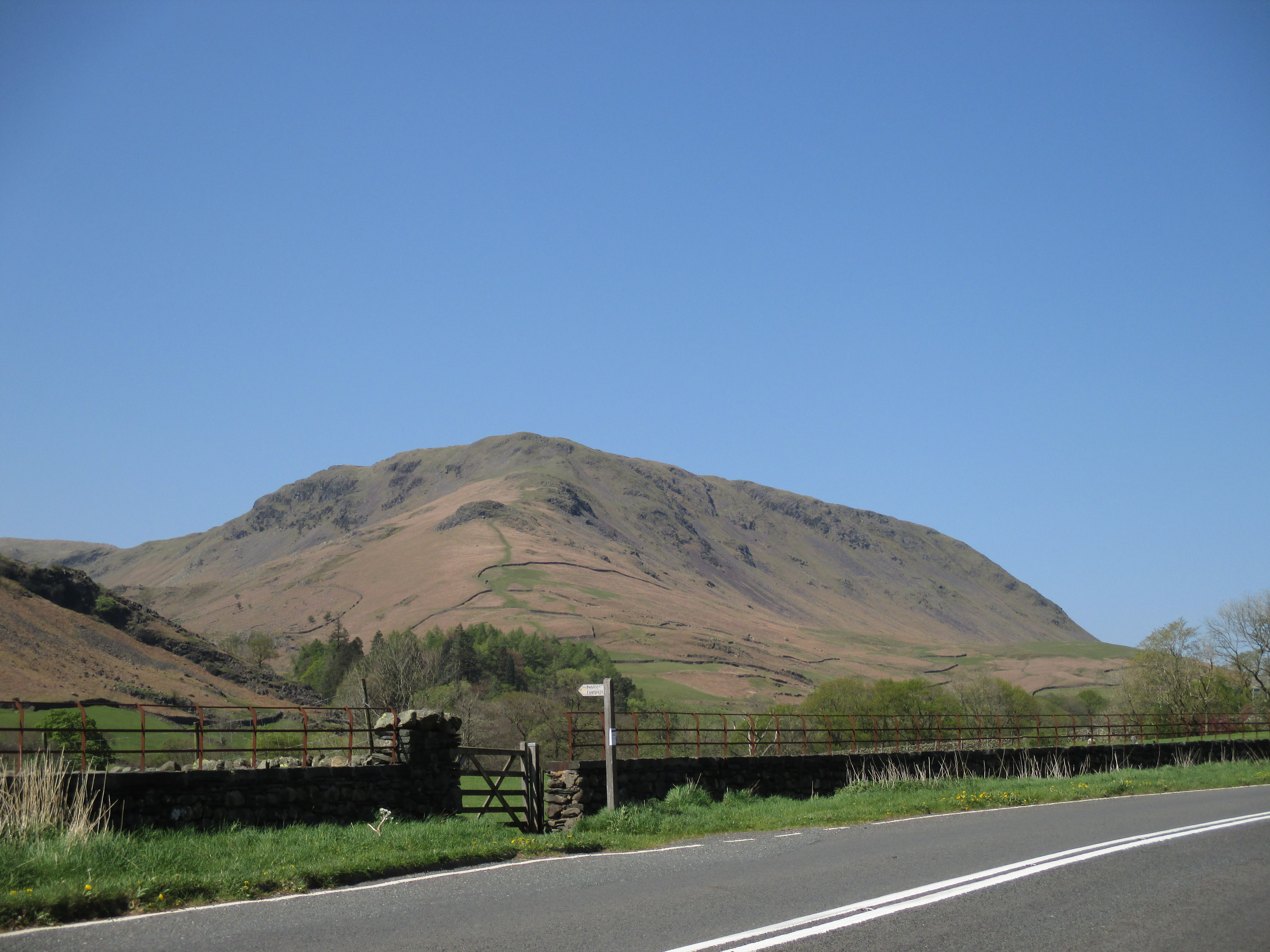
- Steel Fell from the Traveller’s Rest, near Grasmere village.

Highest point
- Elevation: 553 m (1,814 ft)
- Prominence: c. 70 m (230 ft)
- Parent peak: High Raise
- Listing: Wainwright
- Coordinates: 54°29′30″N 3°03′10″W

Geography
- Location within the Lake District
- Location: Cumbria, England
- Parent range: Lake District, Central Fells
- OS grid: NY319112
- Topo map: OS Landranger 90, Explorer OL5

Steel Fell is a fell in the English Lake District, lying between Thirlmere and Grasmere. It is triangular in plan, the ridges running north, west and south east. Steel Fell rises to the west of the Dunmail Raise road and can be climbed from the summit, or from Grasmere and Wythburn.

== Topography ==
Steel Fell stands away from the main spine of the Central Fells, forming the end of one of the many east ridges of High Raise. Intermediate between the two are Codale Head and Calf Crag. Steel Fell is bordered by Wythburndale to the north and the valley of Green Burn to the south-west. The eastern face looks down on Dunmail Raise.

Being triangular in plan, Steel Fell has three principal ridges. The northern ridge drops quickly to the head of Thirlmere at Steel End, while that to the south-east falls gradually toward Grasmere village, beginning down Cotra Breast. The eastern ridge connects to Calf Crag, the next fell in the popular circuit of the Greenburn valley, crossing a narrow depression with a scattering of small tarns.

The southern face of Steel Fell falls over Blakerigg Crag to Greenburn, a feeder of the lake of Grasmere. Wythburndale marks the north western boundary of the fell, flowing to Thirlmere. The eastern face drops over Ash Crags to the pass of Dunmail Raise. Two streams, both named Raise Beck, flow north and south down the pass, following the main Keswick–Ambleside road. Steel Fell thus sits on the Lake District’s main north–south watershed. Water from the southern slopes reaches the sea at Morecambe Bay while rain falling a few yards to the north reaches the sea via the River Derwent at Workington.

== Geology ==
The geology of Steel Fell is complex. The summit and Ash Crags exhibit the welded rhyodacitic lapilli tuff and breccia of the Thirlmere Member. The remainder of the fell is characteristic of the Lincomb Tarns Formation of dacitic lapilli tuff with andesite sills. A large sill is evident near the surface above Wythburndale.

== Summit ==
Above the steep faces the triangular plateau, half a mile across, is dotted with small tarns. The summit bears the name Dead Pike and carries a large cairn of reddish stone. The best of the view is to the north, Blencathra appearing above Thirlmere. South-west there is a fine mountain panorama stretching as far as the Coniston Fells.

== Ascents ==
The fell is most commonly climbed via the south east ridge, beginning at Gill Foot where the lane from Grasmere crosses Green Burn. From Steel End at the head of Thirlmere a way can be found onto the north ridge, or a longer route taken up the Wythburn valley to surmount the ridge to Calf Crag. Direct ascents up the eastern face from the summit of Dunmail Raise are also possible.
