= Central Fells =

Region of the Cumbrian Mountains

The Central Fells are a part of the Cumbrian Mountains in the Lake District of England. Reaching their highest point at High Raise (2,500 ft or 762 metres), they occupy a broad area to the east of Borrowdale. The Central Fells are generally lower than the surrounding hills, the Lake District's dome-like structure having a slight dip in the middle. The range extends from the boggy ridge between Derwentwater and Thirlmere in the north, to the rock peaks of the Langdale Pikes in the south.

== Partition of the Lakeland fells ==
The Lake District is a National Park in the north-west of the country which, in addition to its lakes, contains a complex range of hills. These are locally known as fells and range from low hills to the highest ground in England. Hundreds of tops exist and many writers have attempted to draw up definitive lists. In doing so the compilers frequently divide the range into smaller areas to aid their description.

The most influential of all such authors was Alfred Wainwright, whose Pictorial Guide to the Lakeland Fells series has sold in excess of 2 million copies, being in print continuously since the first volume was published in 1952. Wainwright divided the fells into seven geographical areas, each surrounded by valleys and low passes. While any such division must be arbitrary – and later writers have deviated to a greater or lesser extent from this blueprint – Wainwright's sevenfold division remains the best-known partitioning of the fells into "sub ranges", each with its own characteristics. The Central Fells are one of these divisions, covered by volume 3 of Wainwright's work.

== Boundaries ==
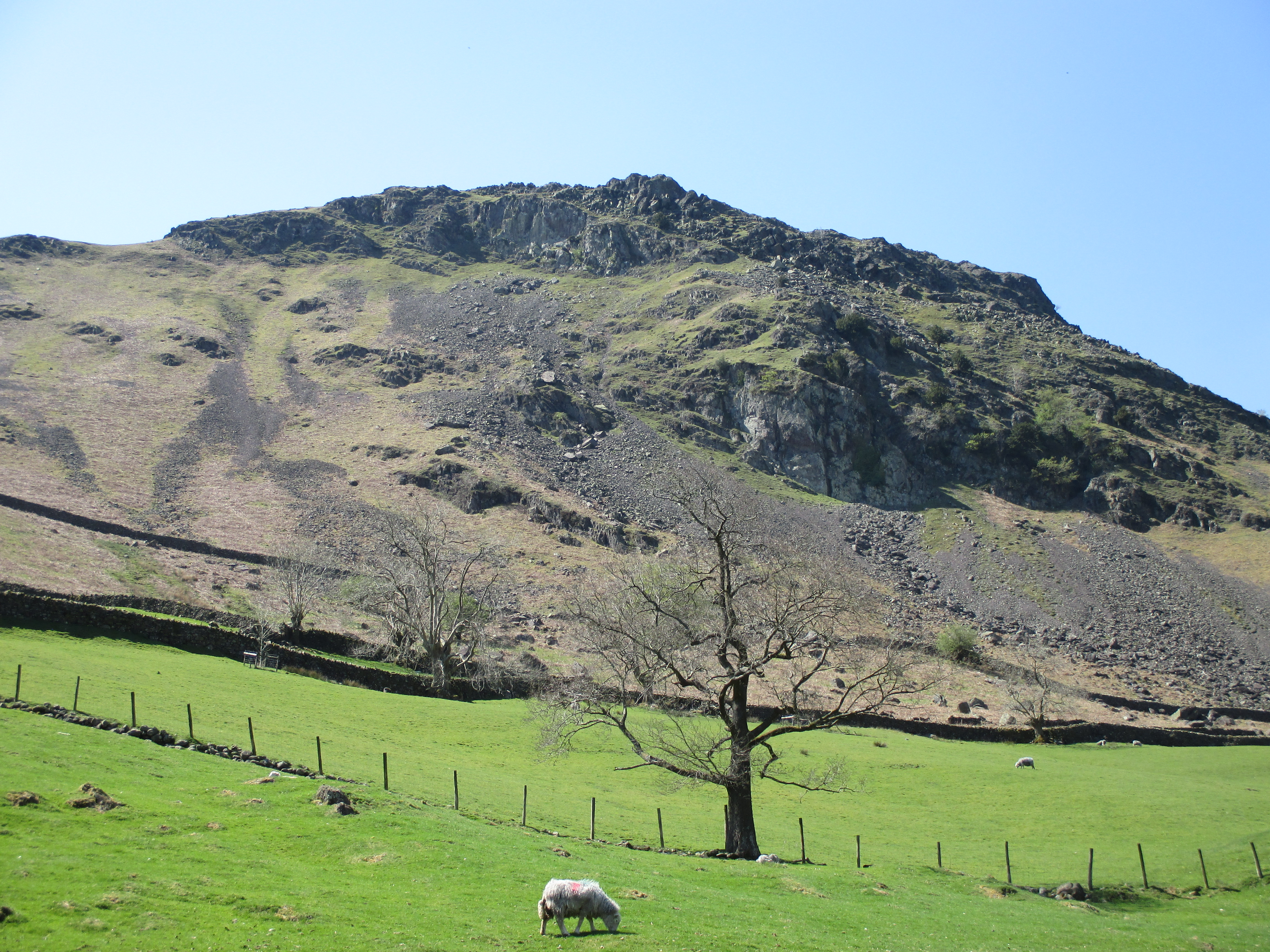
The eastern face of Helm Crag

In the north is the Vale of Keswick, providing wide and total separation from Skiddaw and the Northern Fells. To the west runs the long valley of Borrowdale, flowing in this instance from Stake Pass at the head of Langstrath all the way to Keswick. The parallel eastern boundary is created by Thirlmere and the Vale of St John, all of these valleys ultimately joining the River Derwent. At the head of Thirlmere is the pass of Dunmail Raise, crossed by the A591 road. South of Dunmail Raise the Vale of Grasmere runs down to Windermere, forming the remainder of the eastern boundary. In the west, Stake Pass descends into Great Langdale. This also descends, via the River Brathay, to Windermere.

As the name suggests, the Central Fells are the only group to be entirely surrounded by other Lakeland ranges. However, topographical links only exist with two of the surrounding groups. South-west across Stake Pass are Rossett Pike and the Southern Fells, while Dunmail Raise connects to Seat Sandal in the Eastern Fells. The North Western and Western Fells are cut off by the long gash of Borrowdale.

== Topography ==
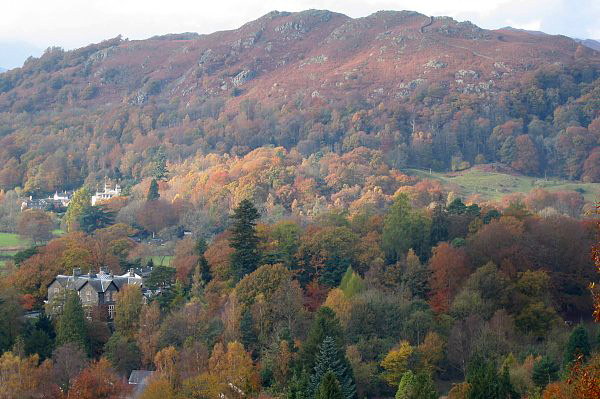
Loughrigg Fell

The Central Fells when seen in plan best resemble a boot. A broad ridge runs due south for about 10 miles (16 km), the valleys on either side being about 3 miles (5 km) apart. The range then narrows and turns south-east, the Langdale Pikes forming the 'heel' and Loughrigg Fell the 'toe'.

Beginning with Walla Crag and Bleaberry Fell in the north, the range climbs gradually to its apex at High Raise, the "ankle" in the boot analogy. This section is often termed the "Central Ridge" and consists of flat-topped, peat-covered hills. Many of the most extensive upland bogs of the district are in this area. South of Bleaberry Fell are High Seat, High Tove (home to The Pewits, the "worst" bog of all) and Ullscarf, the land finally drying out here as High Raise is reached. To the west of the Central Ridge a lower spur encloses the valley of Watendlath. In this sector are Great Crag and Grange Fell, lower hills exposing more rock and popular as short climbs. On the eastern side a further low ridge surrounds Shoulthwaite, topped by the Raven Crag and High Rigg.

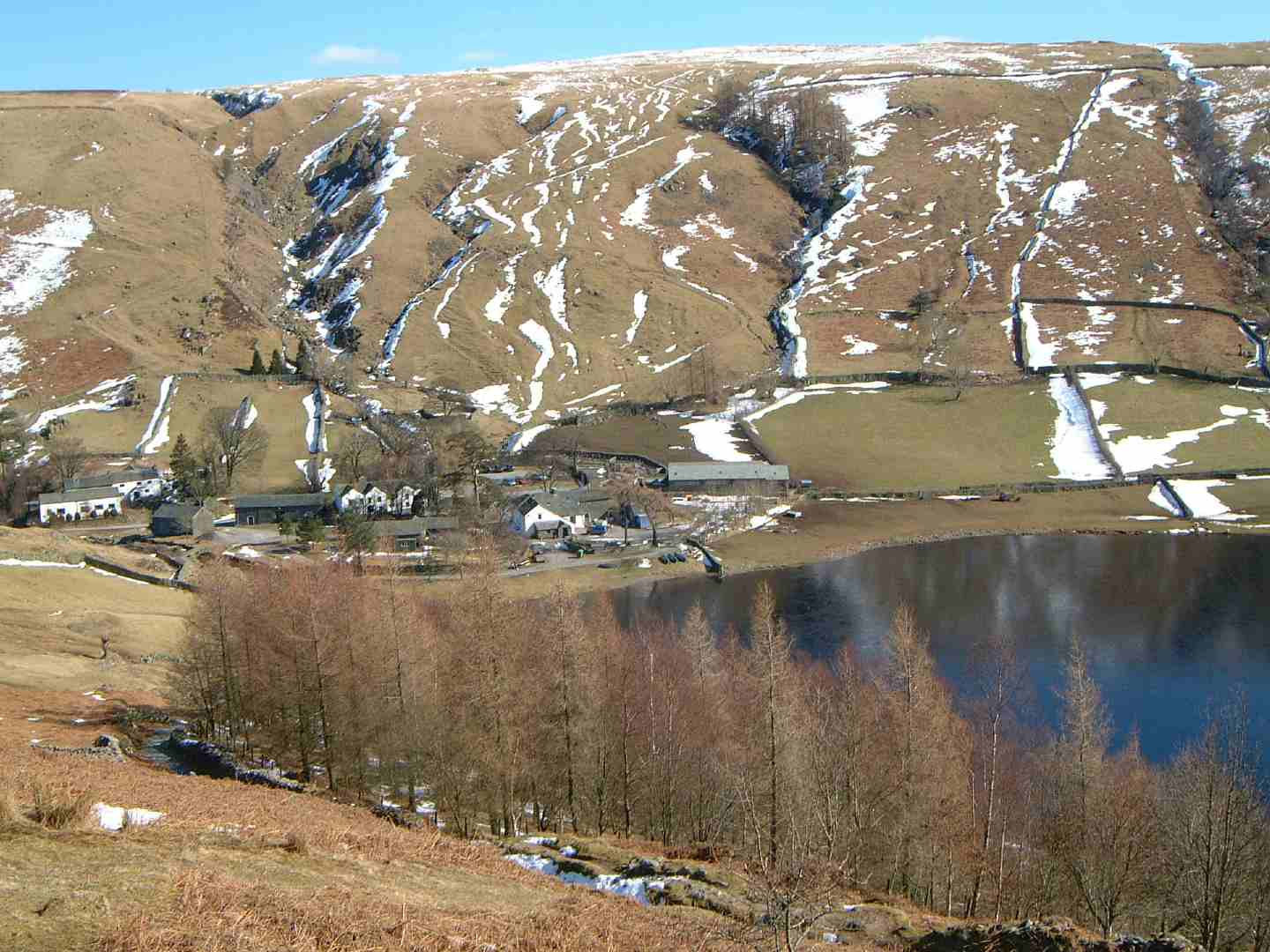
High Tove above Watendlath

High Raise itself is mostly grassy apart from the summit, and a broad plateau runs off south-west over Thunacar Knott. Beyond are a line of low tops, rimming this tableland and appearing nothing from this direction. From the south the Langdale Pikes are most clearly seen, falling direct from their rocky tops to the valley floor of Great Langdale, nearly 2,000 feet (600 m) below. Pike of Stickle stands at the western end, followed by Loft Crag, Harrison Stickle and the cliff of Pavey Ark above Stickle Tarn.

To the east of High Raise a complex system of minor ridges radiates out from the subsidiary top of Sergeant Man. Rising between the valleys of Wythburn, Easedale and Greenburn are Calf Crag, Helm Crag, Gibson Knott, Steel Fell and Tarn Crag. Along with Eagle Crag and Sergeant's Crag on the Borrowdale side these fells display steep flanks and plenty of rock on the summits.

The main ridge descends south-east from High Raise as the ground between the Rivers Brothay and Rathay gradually narrows to a point at Ambleside. In this section are the many tops of Blea Rigg, Silver How (a viewpoint over Grasmere) and finally Loughrigg Fell, easily accessible from White Moss car park and often combined with a walk along the terrace path above Rydal Water.

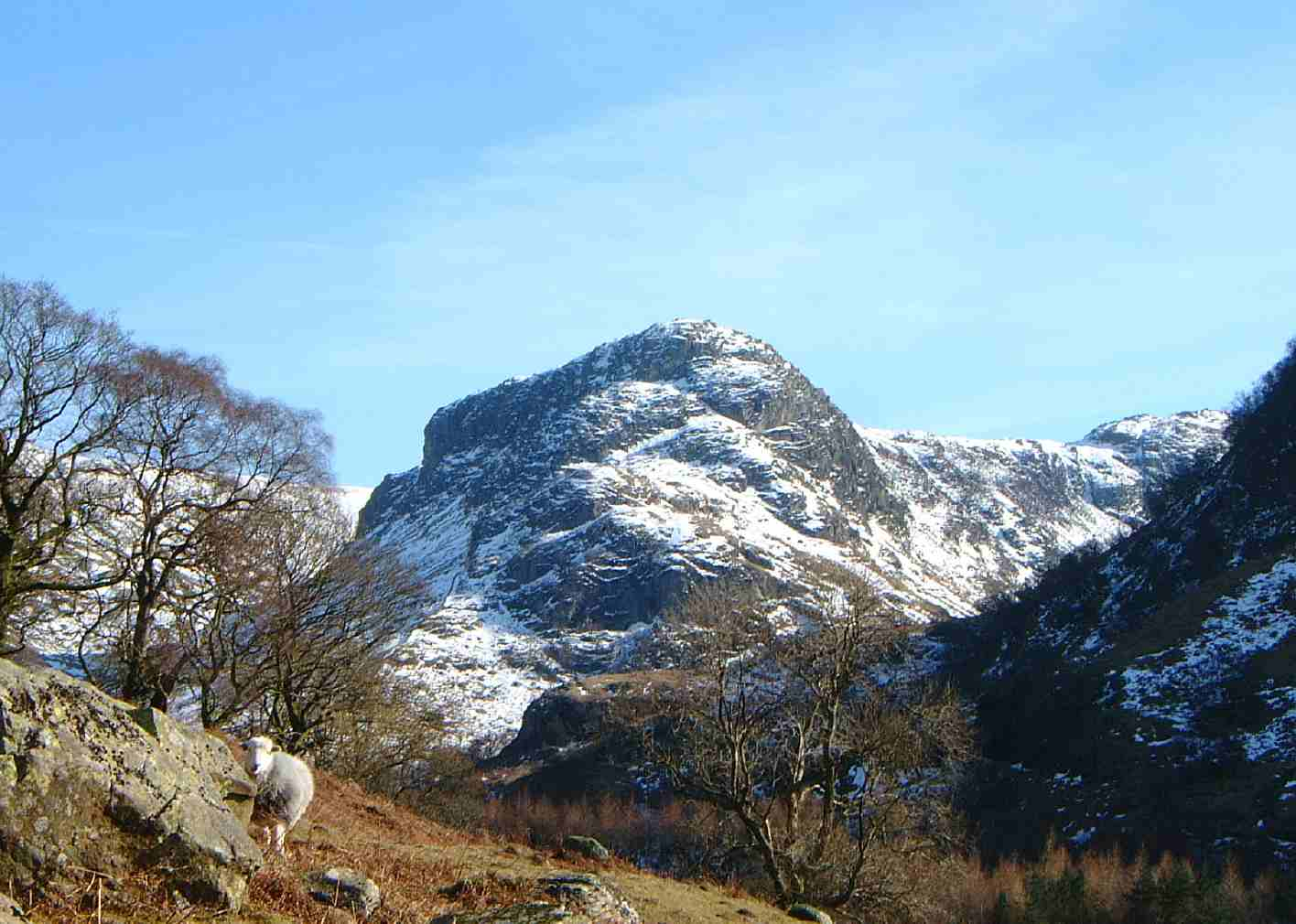
Eagle Crag from Stonethwaite

== Access for walkers ==
In the north, Walla Crag and Bleaberry fell are an easy walk from Keswick, while the Borrowdale road provides access as far south as Eagle Crag and the foot of Langstrath. The A591 road runs the full length of the range in the east, and in combination with the minor road around Thirlmere gives good access at many points. Grasmere village is also a useful starting place for walks around Easedale and Far Easedale. The Langdale Pikes are generally climbed from Great Langdale, beginning from either of the Dungeon Ghyll Hotels. Loughrigg is surrounded by minor roads, including Red Bank, the only one crossing the Central Fells. Near the summit is the youth hostel of High Close.

In general, quieter walking can be had in the centre of the range from High Seat to Ullscarf, while many walkers will be met on Walla Crag or the Langdale Pikes.

== See also ==
- Eastern Fells
- Far Eastern Fells
- Southern Fells
- Northern Fells
- North Western Fells
- Western Fells
