= High Raise (Langdale) =

Mountain in the English Lake District, Cumbria, England

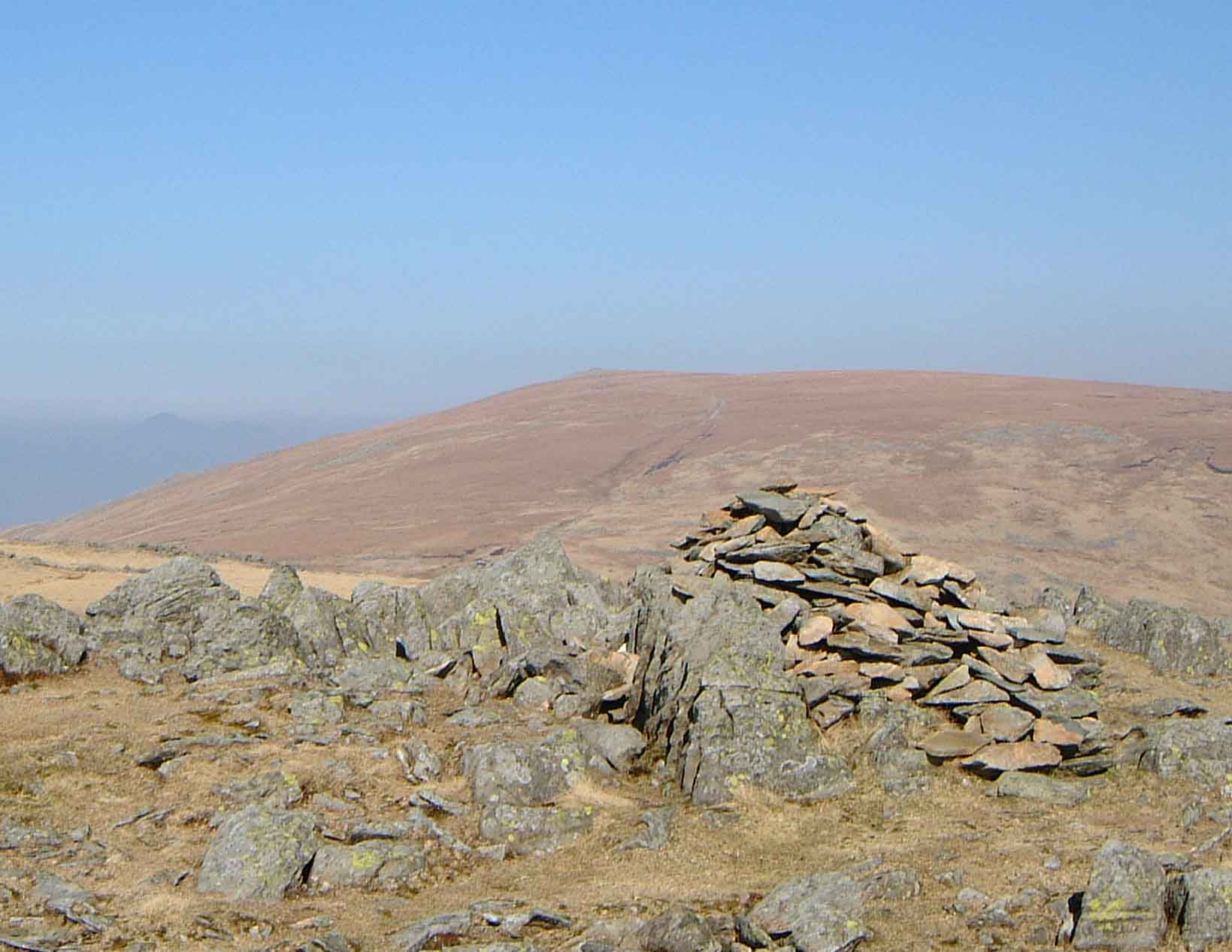
- The unspectacular top of High Raise from the cairn on Thunacar Knott

Highest point
- Elevation: 762 m (2,500 ft)
- Prominence: c. 283 m (928 ft)
- Parent peak: Scafell Pike
- Isolation: 3.47 km (2.16 mi)
- Listing: Marilyn, Hewitt, Wainwright, Nuttall
- Coordinates: 54°28′34″N 3°06′47″W

Geography
- Location within the Lake District
- Location: Cumbria, England
- Parent range: Lake District, Central Fells
- OS grid: NY280095
- Topo map: OS Explorer OL6

Listed summits of High Raise (Langdale)
Name	Grid ref	Height	Status
Codale Head	NY288090	730 m	Nuttall

High Raise is a fell in the Central Fells of the English Lake District, not to be confused with another High Raise situated in the Far Eastern Fells. High Raise is one of the least spectacular mountains in the district; but with a height of 762 metres (2,500 ft) it is the highest point in the central fells of Lakeland.

High Raise is in fact commonly regarded as the most central mountain in the district and this position gives a fine viewpoint to admire the surrounding mountains and beyond. All of England's 3,000-foot (910-metre) mountains (Skiddaw, Helvellyn and the Scafells) can be well seen from the summit while the more distant views include the Three Peaks in the Yorkshire Dales at 37 miles (60 km) and Morecambe Bay at 25 miles (40 km).

== Summit ==
The summit itself, which is also known as High White Stones due to a smattering of grey boulders in the vicinity of the highest point, has an Ordnance Survey column and a large cairn which also doubles as a wind shelter; a ruined fence also crosses the summit plateau.

The view is extensive as befits the central location with all major fell groups visible. The only disappointment being the Langdale Pikes, which seen from behind lack most of their distinctiveness. No lakes are seen other than short sections of Bassenthwaite Lake and Derwentwater.

== Ascents ==
Ascents of High Raise are usually done from Stonethwaite in Borrowdale or the New Dungeon Ghyll Hotel in Great Langdale, although routes are also viable from Grasmere and Thirlmere. The Stonethwaite approach gives the walker a chance to climb the neighbouring fell of Ullscarf, while the route from Great Langdale allows visits to the splendid Langdale Pikes either before or after climbing High Raise.

== Topography ==
The fell is the meeting-point of many ridges. The main watershed of the Central Fells can be thought of as a 'L' shape with High Raise, the highest point, standing at the corner. The northern ridge continues over Ullscarf and High Seat towards the low fells above Keswick. South-eastward the spine continues over Blea Rigg and Silver How, terminating at Loughrigg Fell above Grasmere and Rydal Water.

To the east there are a number of subsidiary ridges, diverging from Sergeant Man. This rocky top is a part of High Raise, but is considered by many writers as a separate fell because of its appearance. Beyond lie Calf Crag, Gibson Knott, Helm Crag, Steel Fell and Tarn Crag. South of High Raise lie its most famous offspring, the Langdale Pikes. These picturesque craggy heights form the parapet of High Raise's southern plateau, standing atop the valley wall and the centrepiece of many views.

== Geology ==
High White Stones is an outcrop of the Lincomb Tarns Formation. This consists of dacitic welded lapilli tuff and volcaniclastic sandstone. These rocks are overlain by till over the rest of the summit area.
