= Loughrigg Fell =

Fell in the Lake District, Cumbria, England

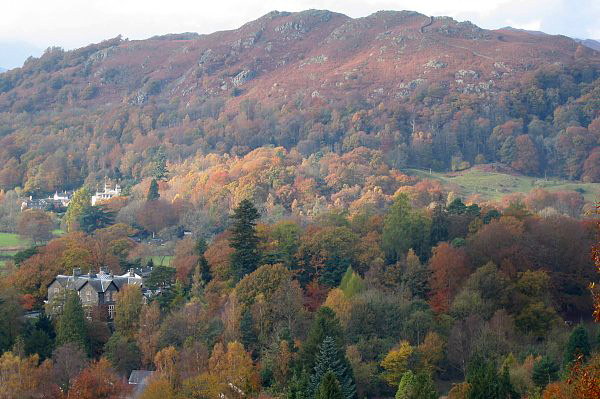

Highest point
- Elevation: 335 m (1,099 ft)
- Prominence: c. 172 m
- Parent peak: High Raise
- Listing: Marilyn (hill), Wainwright
- Coordinates: 54°26′14″N 3°00′30″W

Naming
- English translation: Lake-ridge hill
- Language of name: Northern English dialect
- Pronunciation: /ˌlʌfrɪɡ ˈfɛl/

Geography
- Location within the Lake District
- Location: Cumbria, England
- Parent range: Lake District, Central Fells
- OS grid: NY347051
- Topo map: OS Landranger 90

Listed summits of Loughrigg Fell
Name	Grid ref	Height	Status
Fox How	NY358048	246 m	separate hill
Lanty Scar	NY359093	230 m	hill
Todd Crag	NY358042	224 m	hill
Little Loughrigg	NY344039	155 m	hill

Loughrigg Fell is a hill in the central part of the English Lake District. It stands on the end of the long ridge coming down from High Raise over Silver How towards Ambleside, and is separated from its neighbours by the depression of Red Bank.

== Topography ==
The fell is surrounded by an unusual amount of open water. To the north the River Rothay flows through Grasmere and Rydal Water before bending around the eastern side of Loughrigg. On the southern flank the River Brathay runs from Elter Water and is also fed by the outfall from Loughrigg Tarn. The two rivers merge at Clappersgate on the south eastern corner of the fell, just before flowing into Windermere. The western boundary is formed by Red Bank (535 ft or 163 m) on the ridge to Silver How. Unnamed becks fall north and south into Grasmere and Elter Water.

Loughrigg has two subsidiary ridges on its eastern flank. Lanty Scar provides the obvious line of ascent from Rydal, while the spur rising over Todd Crag leads up from Clappersgate. There are many areas of woodland on the lower slopes, giving way to a wide expanse of bracken-clad knolls and small tarns on the top. The summit is on the western side of the plateau and is identified by an Ordnance Survey column. Many lower tops also decorate the fell, sometimes to the confusion of visitors. Windermere, Elterwater and Grasmere are visible from the summit. The vista is open to the south over the green and blue country of Furness, with many fells in view on the other three sides.

The fell is easily accessible, being surrounded by roads on all sides. Ambleside and the smaller settlements of Skelwith Bridge, Elterwater, Grasmere and Rydal are all within reach, as is the popular double car park at White Moss Common. Many paths run over the fell including the well known Loughrigg Terrace, a level path with superb views of Grasmere, Helm Crag and the Fairfield group. Just beyond the eastern end of the Terrace are some quite remarkable caves, caused by quarrying. They penetrate about 150 feet (45 metres) into the hillside and are often full of water; there are other small mines on the fell.

== Geology ==
The geology is complex with the dacitic welded lapilli tuff and volcaniclastic sandstone of the Lincomb Tarns Formation outcropping on the south-eastern slopes. Nearer the summit are intrusions rhyolite and sills of basaltic andesite. Drift deposits overlie the north-western flanks.

== Summit ==
The highest rocky knoll can be identified by an Ordnance Survey triangulation column beside a large cairn, both standing out from the turf. The view includes intimate views of the Langdale Pikes and the fells around Grasmere, together with the Fairfield horseshoe and the Coniston Fells. Elter Water, Grasmere and a large part of Windermere can also be seen.

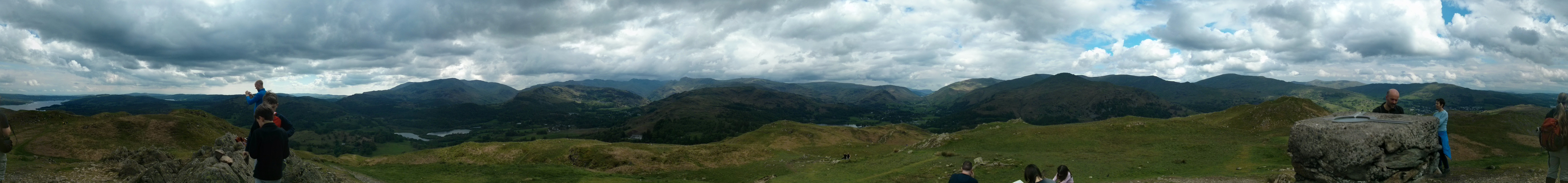
Panorama of the summit of Loughrigg Fell

== Ascents ==
An easy way up Loughrigg is from the White Moss car park, on the A591 between Grasmere and Rydal Water. This simple walk entails only around 700 feet (210 metres) of ascent over a distance of 1 1/2 miles (2.5 kilometres). From the car park a trail leads through woods onto Loughrigg Terrace. From the end of the terrace a path leads up left steeply over steps to the wide, undulating top area. Ascents are also possible from any of the surrounding settlements with manifold variations.

Loughrigg Fell is on the route of the Windermere Way, a long distance footpath that circumambulates Windermere.

The summit is the middle one of three visible knolls.

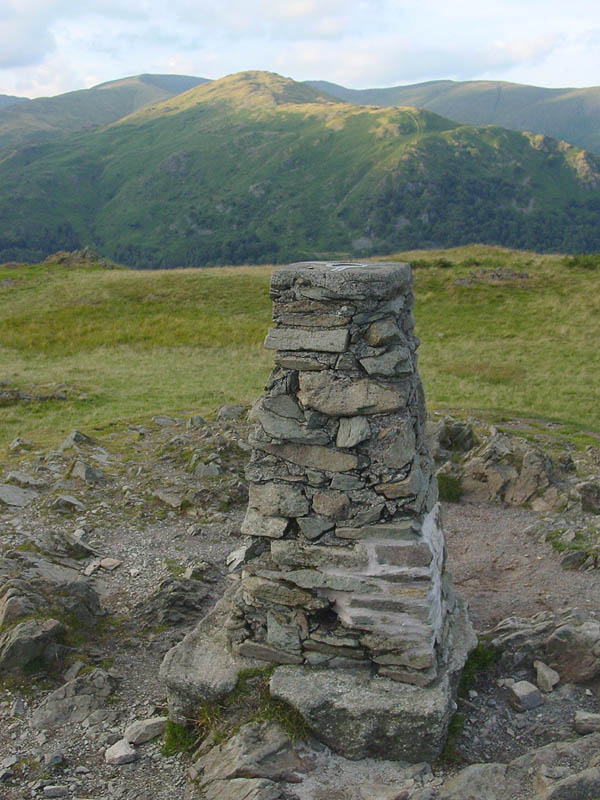
The trig point at the summit of Loughrigg, with Fairfield in the background

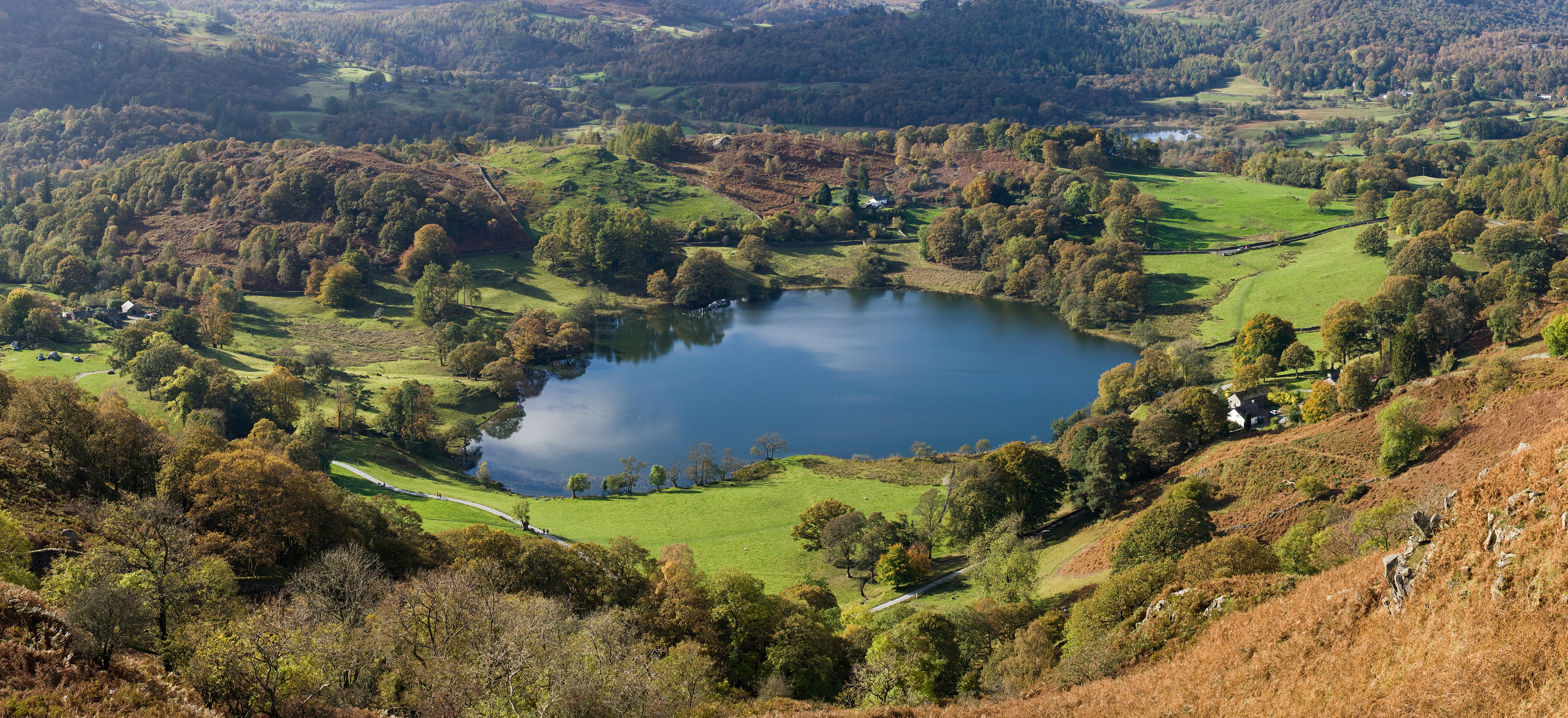
Loughrigg Tarn, as seen from Loughrigg Fell
