= Easedale Tarn =

Lake in Cumbria, England

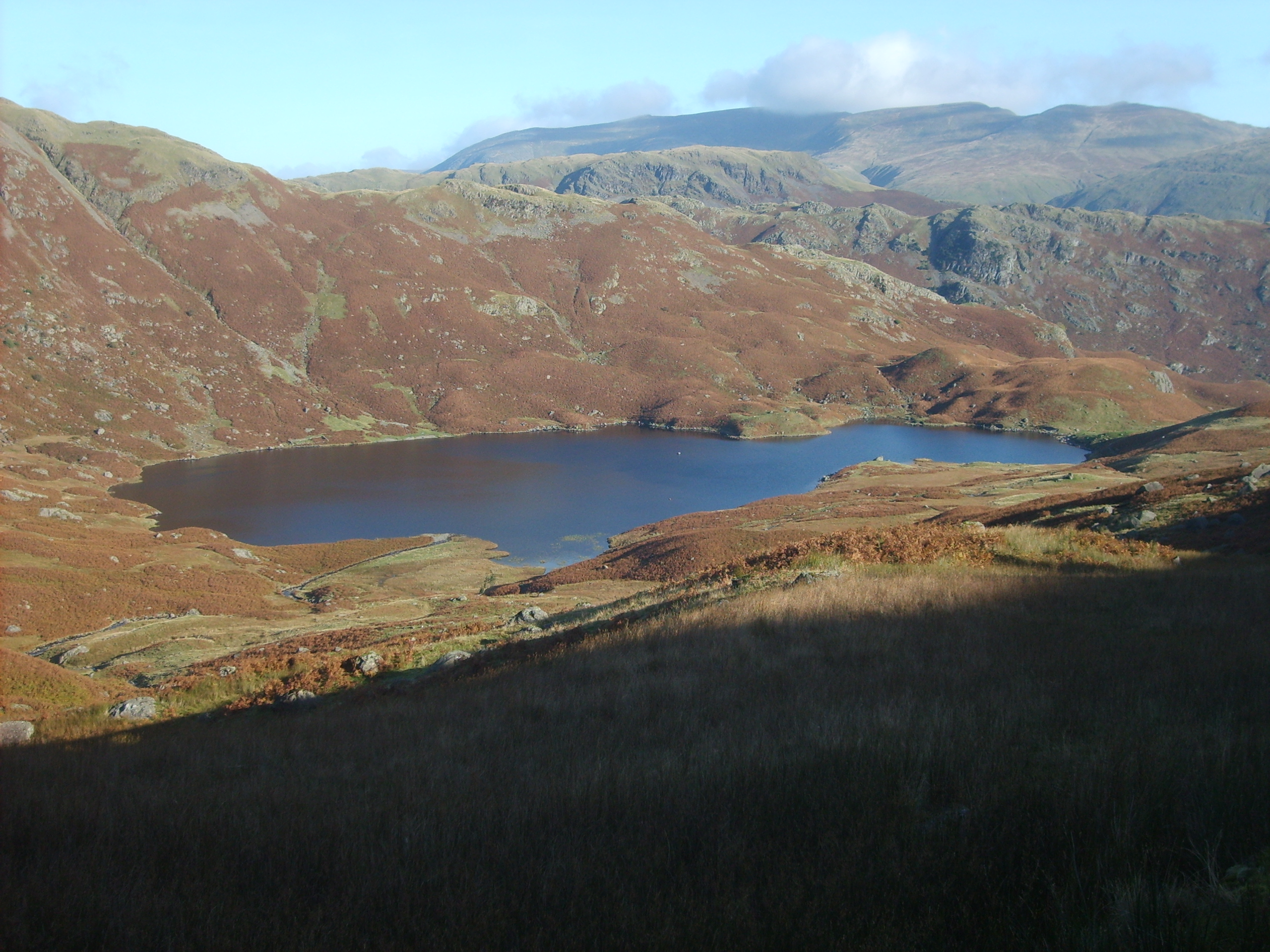
- Easedale Tarn as seen on the ascent of Blea Rigg, Helvellyn is seen in the background.

- Location in the Lake District National Park Location in South Lakeland, Cumbria
- Location: Lake District, United Kingdom
- Coordinates: 54.4695°N 3.0696°W
- Type: tarn
- Primary outflows: Sourmilk Gill
- Max. length: 480 metres (1,570 ft)
- Max. width: 300 metres (980 ft)

Easedale Tarn is a tarn in the centre of the English Lake District, about two miles west of the village of Grasmere. It lies in a hollow between Tarn Crag to the north and Blea Rigg to the south, about 910 feet or 280 metres above sea level. The hollow was formed by a small corrie glacier, and is believed to have filled with water around 11,000 years ago when the ice finished melting.

Easedale Tarn is one of the larger tarns in the district, about 480 metres (1,570 ft) long and 300 metres (980 ft) wide. Its outflow is Sourmilk Gill, named after the milky white colour of its waterfalls, which runs east towards Grasmere. The gill displays impressive water scenery when seen from Grasmere, and from the path to the tarn.

The tarn is a popular destination for walkers. Many people climb the path from Grasmere which overlooks Sourmilk Gill. The ascent was popular during the Victorian period, and a refreshment hut was even established in the 19th century by Robert Hayton of Grasmere above the outlet of the tarn to service the thirsty visitors. The hut is long gone, and nettles now grow where the ruins used to be.
