= Calf Crag =

Fell in Cumbria, England

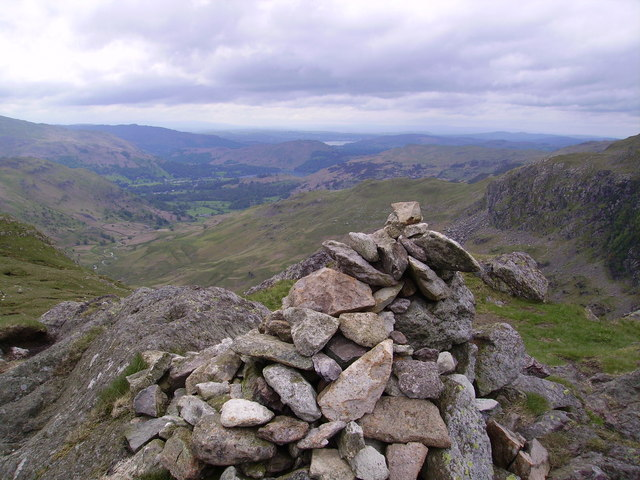
- Summit Cairn

Highest point
- Elevation: 537 m (1,762 ft)
- Prominence: c. 40 m (130 ft)
- Parent peak: High Raise
- Listing: Wainwright
- Coordinates: 54°29′06″N 3°04′44″W

Geography
- Location within the Lake District
- Location: Cumbria, England
- Parent range: Lake District, Central Fells
- OS grid: NY302105
- Topo map: OS Landranger 90

Calf Crag is a fell in the English Lake District, on the eastern side of the High Raise massif.

== Topography ==
The spine of the Central Fells runs on a north–south axis with the high point at High Raise. A complex system of dale-heads to the east of this apex resolves itself into Calf Crag, a broad-topped ridge featuring a number of rocky tops.

Calf Crag is bounded by Wythburndale to the north and by its upper gathering grounds to the west. Far Easedale lies to the south while the head of Greenburn forms the eastern face, both of these sides being craggy. The Wyth Burn flows north east into Thirlmere while Far Easedale Gill and Green Burn descend to the River Rothay and ultimately to Windermere. Calf Crag thus stands on the main north-south watershed of the Lakeland Fells.

The summit plateau, about a mile (1 1/2 km) across, sends two narrow eastern ridges to the north and south of Greenburn Bottom. The former leads to Steel Fell, while the southern spur passes over Gibson Knott before ending at Helm Crag. Southwest from Calf Crag the ground rises over rocky terrain to Sergeant Man and High Raise, although this could hardly be termed a ridge.

== Geology ==
Much of Calf Crag is covered by Quaternary deposits although the summit knoll is an outcrop of the Lincomb Tarn Formation. This is composed of dacitic lapilli tuff with andesite sills. The eastern crags at Pike of Carrs display the underlying Esk Pike Formation of volcaniclastic sandstone.

== Summit ==
The summit is a rocky knoll with a small crag directly to the south. There is a tidy cairn although the patch of rushes noted by Wainwright is no longer in evidence. A tarn lies between here and a subsidiary top to the west.

The view is heavily restricted by higher fells westward, but there is a fine vista of the lake of Grasmere with the Helvellyn range rising behind. Paths on the fell follow the routes to Steel Fell, Gibson Knott and Sergeant Man. A bridleway over Greenup Edge (a section of the Coast to Coast Walk) passes southwest of the top as it leads from Borrowdale to Far Easedale.

== Ascents ==
Grasmere village is the most convenient starting point with approaches possible along either Far Easedale or Green Burn. The latter makes a direct assault up a grassy strip between Pike of Carrs and Rough Crag, while the Far Easedale route gains the ridge 'behind' the summit. Beginning from the head of Thirlmere a way can also be made up Wythburndale, although this will involve a certain amount of bog-hopping.

Indirect climbs are popular as part of the 'Greenburn Horseshoe', also taking in Steel Fell, Gibson Knott and Helm Crag
