= Dunmail =

Dunmail is a legendary king of Cumbria associated with Dunmail Raise. According to tradition, Dunmail was the last king of Cumbria, and buried beneath the cairn at Dunmail Raise after having been slain by the English. Dunmail Raise, meaning "Dyfnwal's Cairn", may well be named after the historical Dyfnwal ab Owain, King of Strathclyde.

== Legend ==
According to local legend, Dunmail, king of Cumbria, was attacked by the combined forces of Edmund and Malcolm and retreated into the heart of the Lake District. Dunmail met the kings in battle in the pass that divides Grasmere from Thirlmere but was defeated, and killed in the fight (it is said at the hands of Edmund himself) and his sons were subsequently blinded by the victors. Some of the surviving Cumbrians, taken prisoner by Edmund, were ordered to collect rocks to pile on Dunmail's body, forming a cairn that still exists to this day and gives the pass its modern name, Dunmail Raise. Others of Dunmail's warriors fled with the crown of Cumbria, climbing into the mountains to Grisedale Tarn where they threw it into the depths to be safe until some future time when Dunmail would come again to lead them. Every year the spirits of the warriors are said to return to the tarn, recover the crown and carry it down to the cairn on Dunmail Raise. There they strike the cairn with their spears and a voice is heard from deep inside the stones, saying "Not yet, not yet; wait awhile, my warriors."

Dunmail features as a character (and his death is described) in the classic story of the Vikings in Lakeland Thorstein of the Mere by W. G. Collingwood. He is mentioned briefly in Cue for Treason by Geoffrey Trease.

At an earlier date, the story was versified by William Wordsworth in Canto First of 'The Waggoner', ll. 209-14; composed 1805, published 1819:

They now have reach'd that pile of stones
Heap'd over brave king Dunmail's bones,—
He who once held supreme command,
Last king of rocky Cumberland.
His bones and those of all his power,
Slain here in a disastrous hour.

As far as written history is concerned, the name of the "Dunbalrasse stones" is recorded in a map of the 1570s, and the association of the cairn with the king is recorded as early as the seventeenth century, when John Ogilby wrote that "Dunmail-Raise-Stones" were erected by a Cumbrian ruler of that name to mark the frontier of his kingdom. The specific association with the historic invasion of the Kingdom of the Cumbrians in 945 appears repeatedly in the 1700s, in the works of the antiquaries Thomas West, Thomas Pennant. and William Gilpin. Joseph Nicolson and Richard Burn gave both versions of the story.
