= Helm Crag =

Fell located in the English Lake District

Coordinates: 54.47548°N 3.04007°W

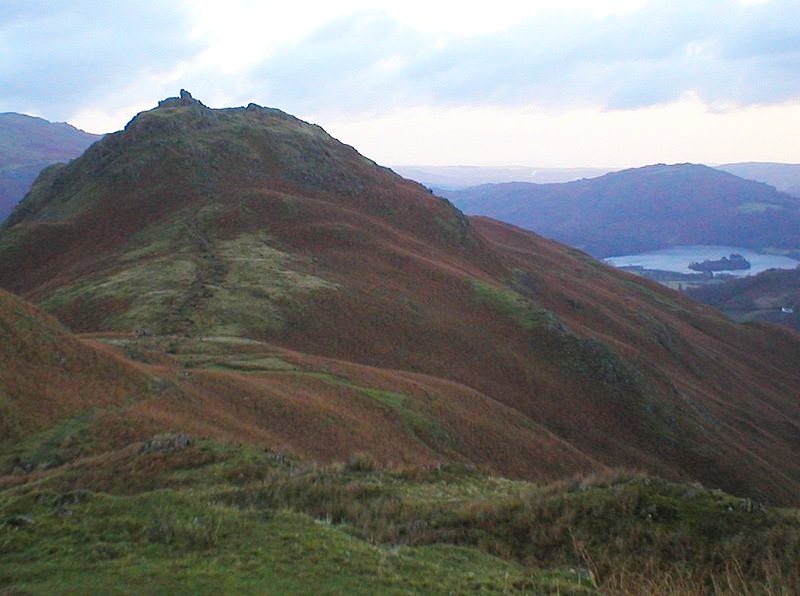
- Looking to Helm Crag from Gibson Knott

Highest point
- Elevation: 405 m (1,329 ft)
- Prominence: c. 60 metres (197 ft)
- Parent peak: High Raise
- Listing: Wainwright

Geography
- Location: Cumbria, England
- Parent range: Lake District, Central Fells
- OS grid: NY327094
- Topo map: OS Explorer OL5, OL7

Helm Crag is a fell in the English Lake District situated in the Central Fells to the north of Grasmere. Despite its low height it sits prominently at the end of a ridge, easily seen from the village. This, combined with the distinctive summit rocks which provide the alternative name 'The Lion and the Lamb', makes it one of the most recognised hills in the District.

Alfred Wainwright wrote of Helm Crag that "The virtues of Helm Crag have not been lauded enough. It gives an exhilarating little climb, a brief essay in real mountaineering, and, in a region where all is beautiful, it makes a notable contribution to the natural charms and attractions of Grasmere."

== Topography ==
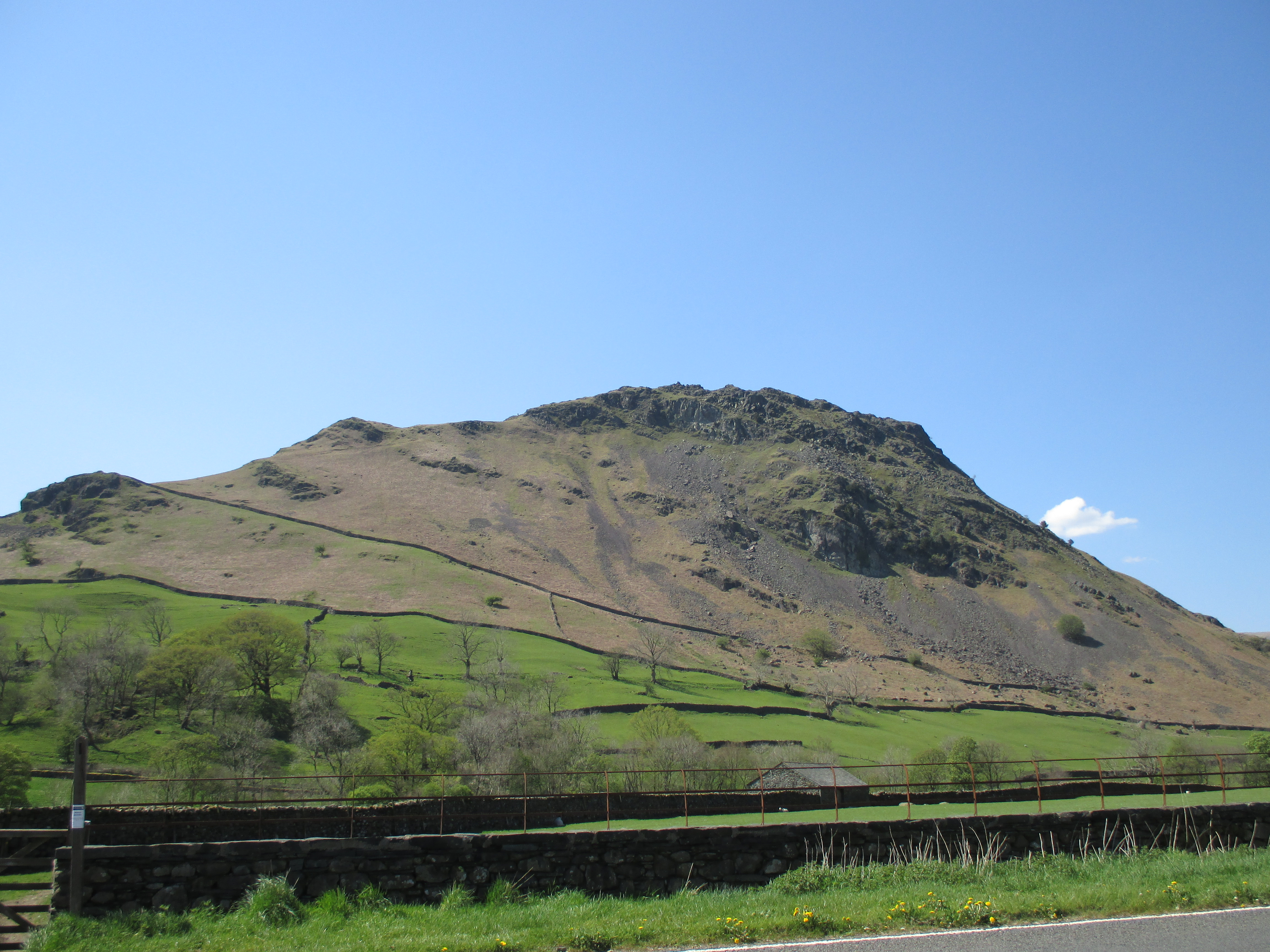
The eastern face of Helm Crag

A rocky ridge curves east and then south east from Calf Crag, passing over Gibson Knott and the depression of Bracken Hause, before ending at Helm Crag where it falls steeply on all sides. To the north and east of the ridge is the Greenburn valley, which joins the Rothay at Helm Side. To the west and south is Easedale Beck, which is also a feeder of the Rothay, the watersmeet being just north of Grasmere village. Helm Crag is generally rough, with particular features being High and Low Raven Crags on the eastern side and White Crag on the southern extremity.

== Geology ==
The geology of the fell is complex, but the summit is in an area of outcropping andesite sill.

== Summit ==
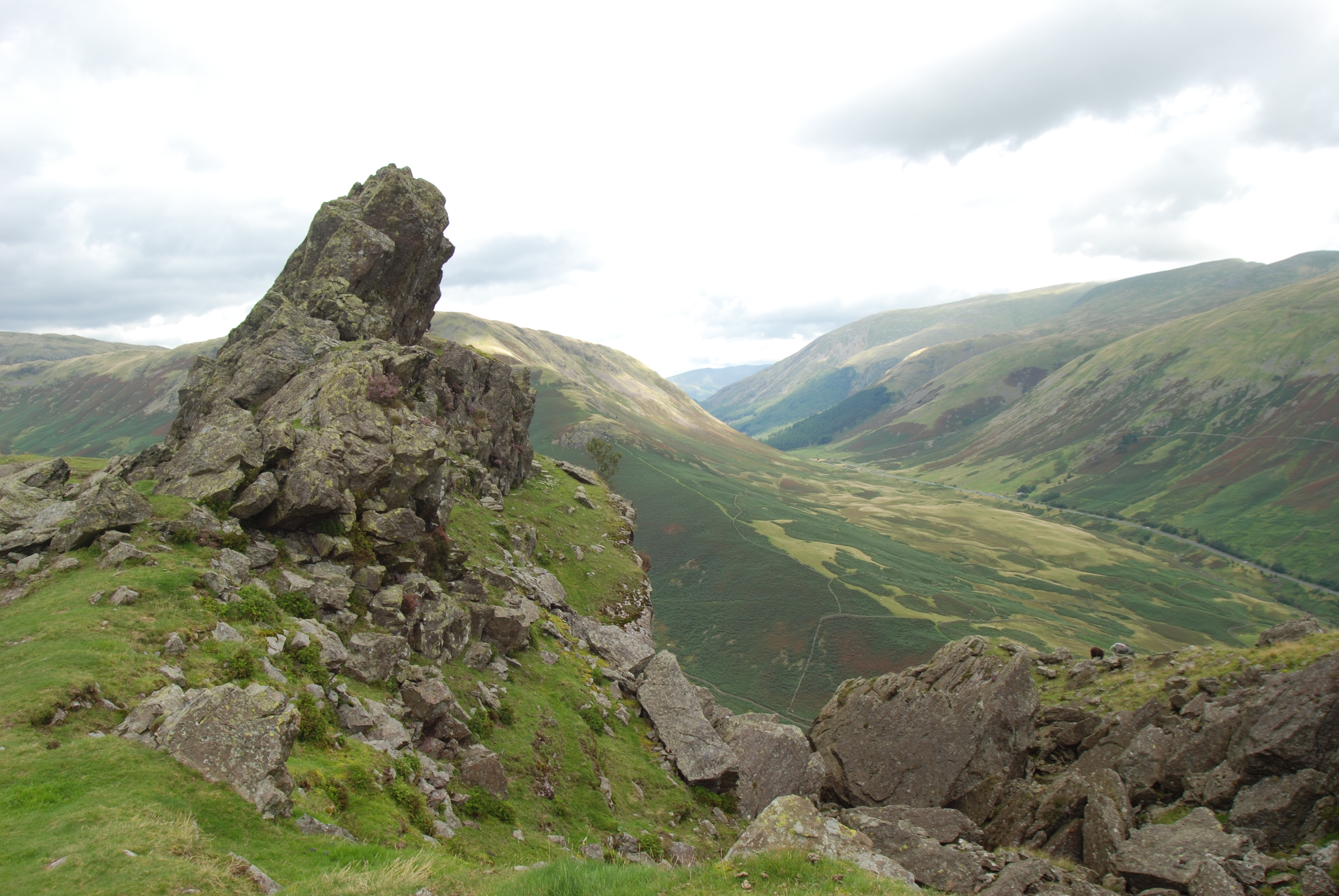
The Summit

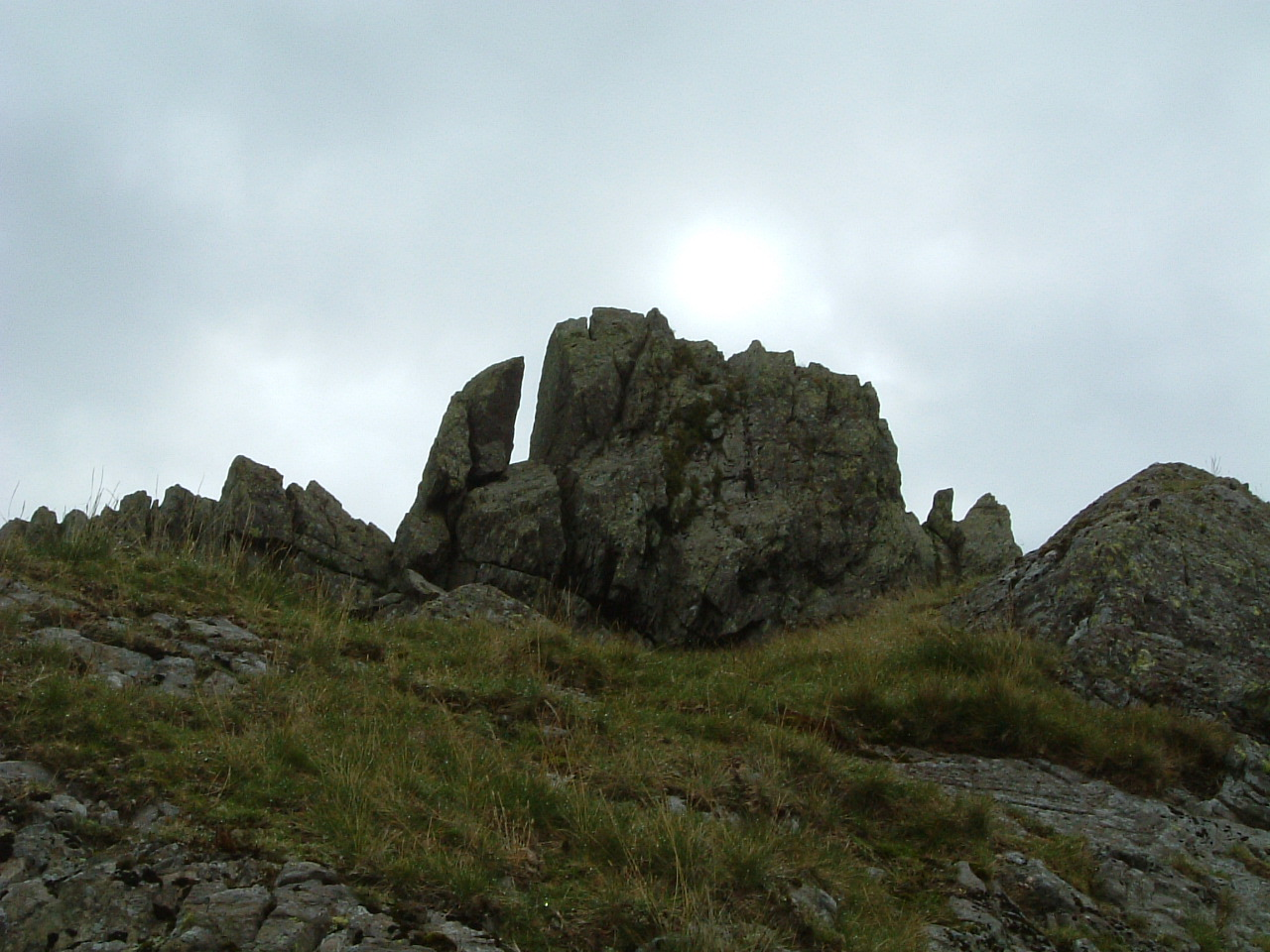
The "Old Woman playing the Organ" rocks.

The summit is unusual, having two short parallel ridges running north west to south east with a hollow in between, the western ridge being the higher. Some distance below the eastern ridge the scene is repeated as, still keeping parallel, a third ridge, ditch and parapet are crossed before the crags are reached. The whole complex initially appears man-made, but is entirely natural. The summit commands views of the Langdale Pikes, Coniston Fells and Eastern Fells.

== The Lion and the Lamb ==
At either end of the highest ridge are the rock outcrops that ensure Helm Crag's fame. Only one can be seen from any point in the surrounding valleys, and they have a variety of names depending upon the profile seen from the particular vantage point. The northwestern outcrop is the true summit of the fell, a tricky little scramble being needed to stand on the top. It is variously called "The old lady playing the organ" when seen from Mill Gill, "The howitzer" from the summit of Dunmail Raise and "The lion and the lamb" or "The lion couchant" from a point in between. The southern outcrop is prominent from Grasmere and this is the traditional "Lion and the lamb".

== Ascents ==
Helm Crag is normally ascended from Grasmere, though can also be approached from either valley via Bracken Hause, or along the ridge from Gibson Knott.
