= Ullscarf =

Fell in England

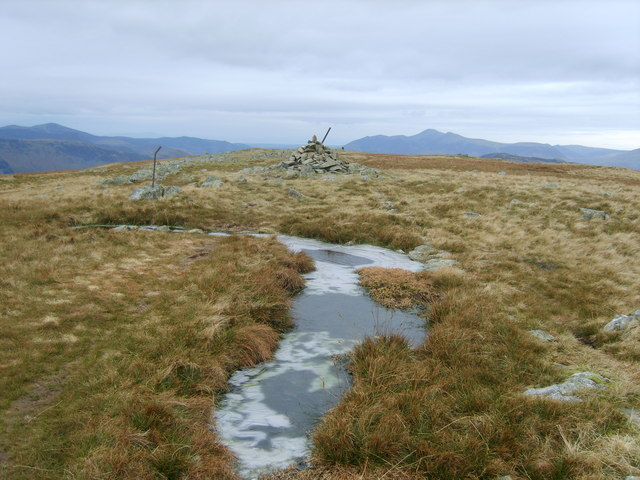

Highest point
- Elevation: 726 m (2,382 ft)
- Prominence: c.115 metres (377 ft)
- Parent peak: High Raise
- Listing: Wainwright, Nuttall, Hewitt
- Coordinates: 54°30′01″N 3°05′41″W

Geography
- Location within the Lake District
- Location: Cumbria, England
- Parent range: Lake District, Central Fells
- OS grid: NY292122
- Topo map: OS Explorer OL4

Listed summits of Ullscarf
Name	Grid ref	Height	Status
Low Saddle	NY288133	656 m	Nuttall

Ullscarf is a fell in the English Lake District close to the geographical centre of the Cumbrian hills. It forms part of the watershed between the Derwentwater and Thirlmere catchments, a ridge running broadly north-south.

== Topography ==
Ullscarf is bordered on the west by the Greenup valley, with steep but mainly grassy slopes, the chief exception being Lining Crag. This rock face is prominent in views up the valley, standing right beside the bridleway. From above however it is reached via a shallow grassy saddle and makes a fine viewpoint or picnic spot. A number of gills run down this western side of Ullscarf.

To the east lies Thirlmere across a moorland of small hillocks. The final descent is steep, falling down conifer-clad slopes to the reservoir. To the south of Thirlmere is its feeder valley of Wythburndale, which rises eastward to its source below Greenup Edge. Above Wythburndale Ullscarf displays a near continuous line of crags, the principal faces being Castle Crag and Nab Crags. A series of low tops crown the edge above Nab Crags, one of them bearing a prominent stone structure visible from the valley below. This is marked "Beacon" on OS maps, but is in fact a very short length of dry stone wall. It was set up some decades ago to replace a vandalised beacon cairn.

The main ridge of the Central Fells continues south from Ullscarf, dropping over a field of rocky knolls to cross the wide depression of Greenup Edge. This is the connection to High Raise, the highest of the Central Fells. To the north, the natural boundaries are unclear. Standing Crag provides a terminus to the summit plateau, rising above its reflecting tarn. From here the ridge continues across wet ground towards High Tove, the next Wainwright. Some guidebooks consider the intermediate Bell Crags (summit unnamed on Ordnance Survey maps) to be a separate fell. A second subsidiary ridge extends north-north-west from the summit to Great Crag, passing over the twin tops of Coldbarrow Fell.

Between these two northern ridges lies Blea Tarn. A large pool of about 40 ft (12 m) depth, Blea Tarn provides the main feed for the more famous beauty spot of Watendlath Tarn. Drainage to the east (and Thirlmere) is provided by Ullscarf and Launchy Gills, the former flowing via the secluded Harrop Tarn within the Thirlmere Forest. This may be a corrie tarn that has silted up over time, extensive shallows being colonised by sedge, water horsetail and yellow water lilly. These waters are joined by the Wyth Burn from the south of the fell. All water from the west of the fell reaches Greenup Gill via a number of feeders and flows to Derwentwater.

== Geology ==
The summit area is composed mostly of till (clayey silty gravel) overlying rocks of the Lincomb Tarn Formation. This consists of dacitic lapilli tuff with andesite sills. The eastern plateau above Thirlmere shows some outbreaks of the volcaniclastic sandstone of the Esk Pike Formation.

A 16th century mine, Launchy Gill Level, was driven 60 ft (18 m) into the fellside below White Crags on the Thirlmere side of the fell. A scramble is required just to reach the mouth of the level.

== Summit ==
The top of the fell is an upland plateau of about 4 square miles (10 km^{2}), predominantly clad in coarse grass and heather. There are few paths on the fell itself. One track follows the watershed, being marked in places by old iron fenceposts. Bridleways cross the ridge to the north and south of Ullscarf, providing access from Wythburn, Thirlmere, Stonethwaite and Watendlath. The summit is marked by a large cairn on a small rocky outcrop, the old fenceposts marching past (intermittently) in either direction.

Views from the top are extensive, befitting the central location, with the Scafells and Helvellyn ranges being shown to particular effect.

A little more than half of the Wainwrights in the Lake District are visible on a clear day (distances in miles):

1. Knott, 0.4°, 12.9m
2. Armboth Fell, 7.1°, 2.4m
3. High Rigg, 8.9°, 6.2m
4. Raven Crag, 9.0°, 4.1m
5. Blencathra, 10.8°, 9.9m
6. Bannerdale Crags, 13.7°, 10.8m
7. Clough Head, 21.4°, 7.0m
8. Watson's Dodd, 30.0°, 5.3m
9. Great Dodd, 30.2°, 6.1m
10. Stybarrow Dodd, 36.5°, 5.3m
11. Raise, 43.8°, 4.6m
12. White Side, 45.2°, 4.0m
13. Helvellyn, 58.3°, 3.6m
14. Nethermost Pike, 67.8°, 3.5m
15. Dollywaggon Pike, 80.0°, 3.4m
16. High Raise (Martindale), 84.5°, 9.8m
17. Rampsgill Head, 86.5°, 9.5m
18. The Knott, 87.1°, 9.1m
19. Fairfield, 92.6°, 4.2m
20. Seat Sandal, 96.4°, 3.3m
21. Dove Crag, 100.7°, 5.3m
22. Great Rigg, 104.5°, 4.1m
23. Ill Bell, 106.1°, 9.4m
24. Red Screes, 107.1°, 6.8m
25. Steel Fell, 109.4°, 1.9m
26. High Pike (Rydal), 111.1°, 5.6m
27. Stone Arthur, 116.9°, 3.9m
28. Sallows, 118.7°, 10.3m
29. Heron Pike, 120.0°, 4.7m
30. Sour Howes, 122.5°, 10.1m
31. Nab Scar, 126.8°, 5.0m
32. Helm Crag, 128.4°, 2.8m
33. Gibson Knott, 128.9°, 2.2m
34. Loughrigg Fell, 140.9°, 5.6m
35. Silver How, 148.1°, 4.0m
36. Calf Crag, 149.3°, 1.3m
37. Black Fell, 154.3°, 7.2m
38. Tarn Crag (Easedale), 157.5°, 1.9m
39. Blea Rigg, 167.1°, 2.8m
40. Holme Fell, 167.3°, 7.3m
41. Lingmoor Fell, 170.7°, 4.8m
42. Wetherlam, 180.8°, 6.9m
43. Coniston Old Man, 186.6°, 9.0m
44. Brim Fell, 187.8°, 8.6m
45. Sergeant Man, 187.8°, 2.1m
46. Swirl How, 188.3°, 7.3m
47. Great Carrs, 189.6°, 7.1m
48. High Raise (Langdale), 201.1°, 1.8m
49. Crinkle Crags, 209.4°, 5.3m
50. Bowfell, 218.3°, 4.6m
51. Rossett Pike, 221.9°, 3.9m
52. Esk Pike, 228.7°, 4.5m
53. Allen Crags, 235.4°, 4.1m
54. Scafell Pike, 235.9°, 5.6m
55. Great End, 238.9°, 4.7m
56. Lingmell, 243.1°, 5.7m
57. Sergeant's Crag, 244.4°, 1.2m
58. Glaramara, 248.4°, 3.0m
59. Great Gable, 256.1°, 5.1m
60. Green Gable, 258.2°, 4.9m
61. Kirk Fell, 259.1°, 6.1m
62. Red Pike (Wasdale), 262.0°, 7.9m
63. Base Brown, 262.9°, 4.1m
64. Haycock, 263.3°, 9.2m
65. Scoat Fell, 265.6°, 8.2m
66. Eagle Crag, 266.4°, 1.0m
67. Brandreth, 267.3°, 4.8m
68. Pillar, 268.9°, 7.5m
69. Grey Knotts, 272.0°, 4.6m
70. Rosthwaite Fell, 274.2°, 2.1m
71. Crag Fell, 275.6°, 12.2m
72. High Crag, 278.4°, 7.0m
73. High Stile, 281.4°, 7.7m
74. Fleetwith Pike, 282.3°, 5.5m
75. Red Pike (Buttermere), 283.0°, 8.4m
76. Gavel Fell, 288.9°, 11.6m
77. Dale Head, 293.6°, 4.7m
78. Robinson, 296.7°, 6.3m
79. Hindscarth, 298.8°, 5.4m
80. High Spy, 304.2°, 4.3m
81. Grasmoor, 304.4°, 8.8m
82. Wandope, 305.3°, 8.0m
83. Crag Hill, 308.6°, 8.0m
84. Sail, 310.1°, 7.7m
85. Castle Crag, 310.7°, 3.5m
86. Hopegill Head, 312.4°, 9.0m
87. Scar Crags, 314.8°, 7.4m
88. Maiden Moor, 316.8°, 5.0m
89. Grisedale Pike, 317.1°, 8.7m
90. Great Crag, 318.4°, 2.1m
91. Causey Pike, 319.2°, 7.0m
92. Whinlatter, 322.4°, 9.9m
93. Barrow, 325.3°, 7.2m
94. Grange Fell, 325.8°, 3.0m
95. Broom Fell, 326.3°, 11.0m
96. Catbells, 327.4°, 5.6m
97. Lord's Seat, 327.8°, 10.4m
98. Barf, 331.3°, 10.2m
99. Dodd, 341.8°, 9.9m
100. Ullock Pike, 343.3°, 10.7m
101. Long Side, 344.4°, 10.5m
102. Carl Side, 346.2°, 10.1m
103. Skiddaw, 348.7°, 10.7m
104. Skiddaw Little Man, 350.1°, 9.8m
105. Bleaberry Fell, 354.6°, 4.6m
106. High Seat, 355.7°, 3.7m
107. High Tove, 356.0°, 2.7m
108. Lonscale Fell, 356.8°, 9.3m
109. Great Calva, 358.9°, 11.8m

== Ascents ==
From Wythburn to the south east a number of routes are possible. The Wythburn valley (and its bogs) can be followed to reach the ridge at Greenup edge, or more direct climbs can be made via Harrop Tarn. From here either the line of tops above Nab Crags or Standing Crag will be the intermediate objective.

Ullscarf can be climbed from Watendlath, gaining the north-north-east ridge above Blea Tarn, and then ascending over the tops of Coldbarrow Fell.

The most-used route, since it coincides with a section of Wainwright's Coast to Coast Walk, is to follow the Greenup valley from Stonethwaite, passing up beside Lining Crag and then turning north before Greenup edge to 'cut the corner'.
