= Blea Rigg =

Fell in the Lake District, Cumbria, England

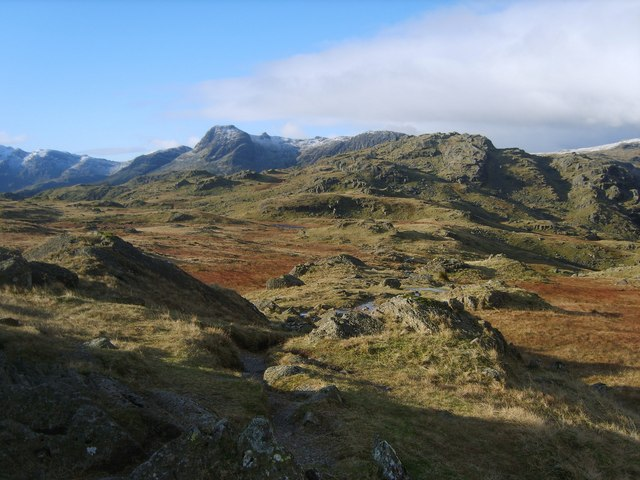

Highest point
- Elevation: 541 m (1,775 ft)
- Prominence: c. 20 m (65 ft)
- Parent peak: Harrison Stickle
- Isolation: 0.36 km (0.22 mi)
- Listing: Wainwright
- Coordinates: 54°27′39″N 3°04′42″W

Geography
- Location within the Lake District
- Location: Cumbria, England
- Parent range: Lake District, Central Fells
- OS grid: NY302078
- Topo map: OS Explorer OL7

Blea Rigg is a fell in the English Lake District, lying between the valleys of Easedale and Great Langdale. One of the Central Fells, it is a broad plateau with a succession of rocky tops. Many routes of ascent are possible, beginning either from Grasmere or Great Langdale, though the paths are often poorly marked and difficult to follow.

== Topography ==
The main spine of the Central Fells runs north to south from the Vale of Keswick to its greatest elevation at High Raise. A long ridge runs out eastward from here, so that the range as a whole resembles the letter 'L'. This eastward ridge begins as Blea Rigg and then continues over Silver How and Loughrigg Fell, before petering out near the head of Windermere.

Blea Rigg is a broad plateau, around a mile wide and two miles long, climbing roughly east to west. It connects via a narrower section between Stickle and Codale Tarns to Sergeant Man and ultimately High Raise in the west. Stickle Tarn is the larger of the two waterbodies, a 15-metre-deep (49 ft) corrie tarn with the level increased by a stone faced dam. It is used to supply water to the residents of Great Langdale. Codale Tarn is a shallow pool set amid rough ground, a little to the north east.

Blea Rigg has a number of named tops in addition to the summit. Travelling west to east these are Great Castle How (500 m [1,600 ft]), Little Castle How (482 m [1,581 ft]), Swinescar Pike (411 m [1,348 ft]) and Lang How (414 m [1,358 ft]). Silver How could also be considered part of Blea Rigg, were it not for Wainwright's decision to accord it a separate chapter in his Pictorial Guide to the Lakeland Fells.

Drainage from the southern side of the fell is via a number of feeders to Stickle Gill and Great Langdale Beck. Among the tributaries is White Gill, its ravine being an interesting route of ascent. Water from the northern flanks reaches Grasmere via Easedale Beck and its feeders. Crags look down over Easedale Tarn and Blindtarn Moss to the north, while further rough ground looms over the Great Langdale road.

== Geology ==
The summit of the fell is formed of the Pavey Ark Member, pebbly sandstone and breccia from the Borrowdale Volcanic series. There is no history of mining within the area of the fell.

== Summit ==
The fell has many rocky tops and a number of sizeable tarns. Added to the network of paths this can make the ridge a confusing place for walkers. It is not always immediately obvious which outcrop forms the actual summit, but a small cairn sits on rock above a stone shelter. The view takes in the eastern and southern fells, plus the nearby Langdale Pikes.

== Ascents ==
Many routes of ascent are possible from either side of the ridge, with a climb from Grasmere over Silver How also popular. From the New Dungeon Ghyll Hotel in Great Langdale the walker can climb either via Stickle Tarn or up the ravine of White Gill. From Grasmere, Easedale Tarn is the preliminary objective. From here Blea Crag can be outflanked on either side to arrive on the summit ridge to the east or west of the summit. Before World War II a stone refreshment hut stood on the slopes of Blea Rigg, just above Easedale Tarn.
