= Dunmail Raise =

Mountain and mountain pass in the English Lake District, Cumbria, England

Coordinates: 54.496°N 3.0404°W

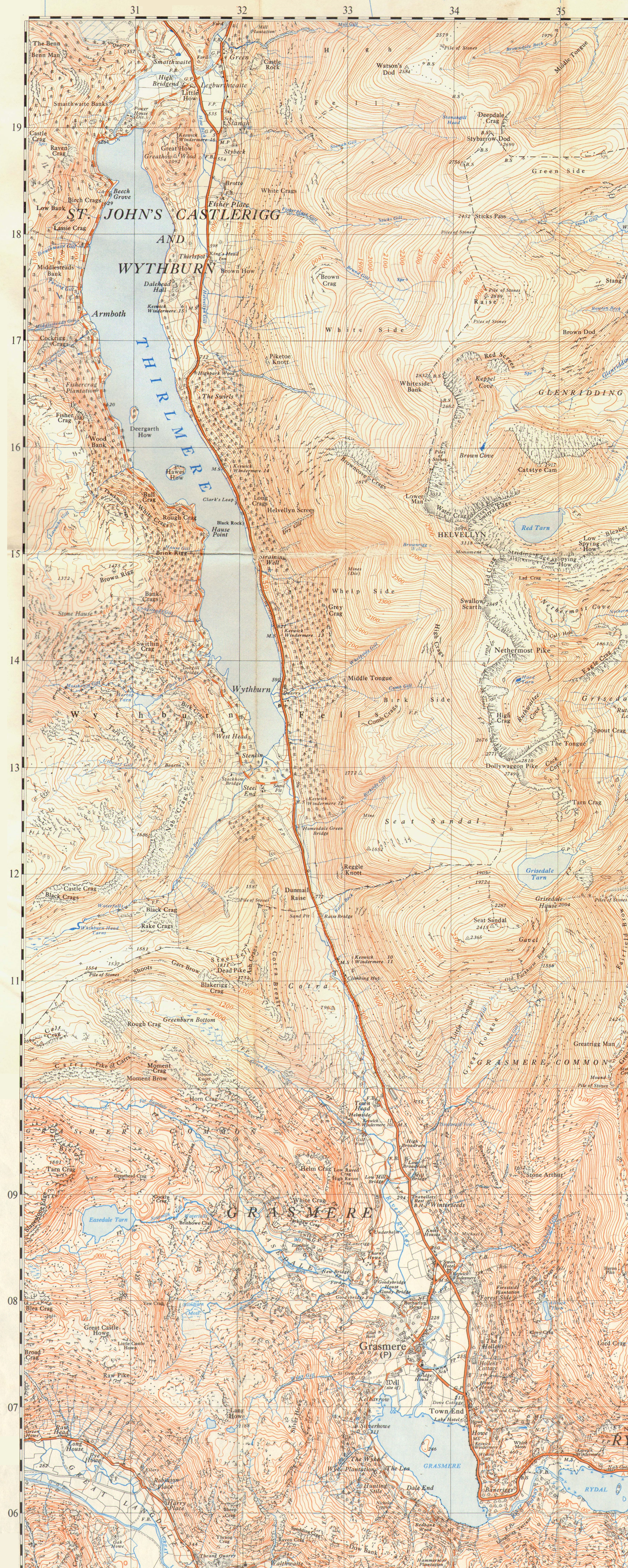
1950s map of Dunmail Raise from Ordnance Survey sheets NY 30 and 31 (scale 1:25,000). The cairn is a mile south of Thirlmere Reservoir.

Dunmail Raise is the name of a large cairn in the English Lake District, which may have been an old boundary marker. It has given its name to the mountain pass of Dunmail Raise, on which it stands. This mountain pass forms part of the only low-level route through the mountains between the northern and southern sides of the Lake District. According to local tradition, the cairn marked the burial of a king named Dunmail who was slain by Saxons. The place name itself may well be derived from the name of the historical Dyfnwal ab Owain, King of Strathclyde.

== Dunmail Raise (mountain pass) ==
A horse-drawn coach passes northwards over Dunmail Raise in the late 19th or early 20th century

The pass of Dunmail Raise connects the Vale of Grasmere to the Thirlmere valley. It forms part of the main east-west watershed of the Lake District: all streams to the north eventually drain into the Solway Firth or the adjacent coast, while those to the south drain into Morecambe Bay. To the east of the pass are the mountains of Helvellyn and Seat Sandal, and to the west lies Steel Fell, part of the High Raise massif.

The pass rises to a height of only 238 metres (781 feet), so the two valleys it connects provide a low-level route of communication, in fact, the only low-level route, between the northern and southern parts of the Lake District. Today the A591 road between Kendal and Keswick takes this route, and the section over Dunmail Raise is a short length of dual-carriageway. There remains a rare example of an AA phone box in a layby to the south of the pass.

== Dunmail Raise (the cairn) ==
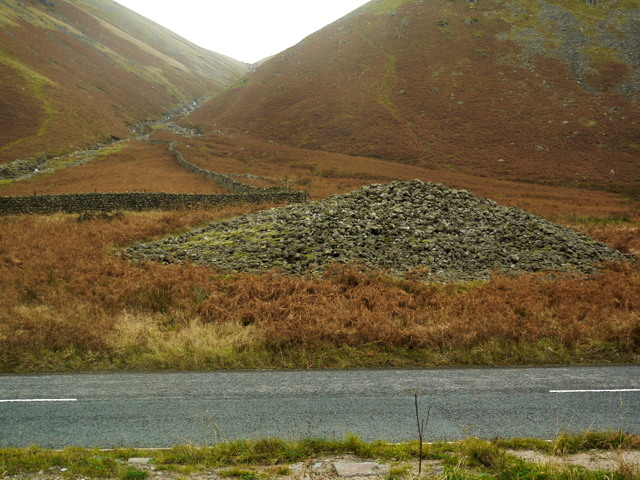
The cairn of Dunmail Raise, beside the A591 road which divides around it.

Dunmail Raise is also the name of a large cairn which stands on the top of the pass, on the central reservation between the two carriageways of the road. The cairn appears to be ancient although it has been disturbed by road-building. "Raise" is an old name for a cairn, a construction which has been "raised up" by depositing stones.

The cairn itself lies between the dual carriageways of the A591 road. It seems to have marked an old boundary between Westmorland and Cumberland, and might have also marked the southern territorial extent of the medieval Kingdom of Strathclyde. According to local folklore, the cairn was raised over the body of a Cumbrian king named Dunmail who was slain by Saxons. The place name itself may well refer to the historical Dyfnwal ab Owain, King of Strathclyde (died 975), and seems to mean "Dyfnwal's Cairn".

== The Thirlmere Aqueduct ==
The Thirlmere Aqueduct, which conducts water from Thirlmere Reservoir to Manchester, passes through a tunnel beneath Dunmail Raise. A water treatment plant, owned and operated by United Utilities, is situated at the southern end of the tunnel, beside the A591. Here the water is filtered by passing it through screens and microstrainers, its pH is adjusted with sodium hydroxide and it is treated with chlorine.

== See also ==
- List of hill passes of the Lake District
