= Silver How =

Fell in the Lake District, Cumbria, England

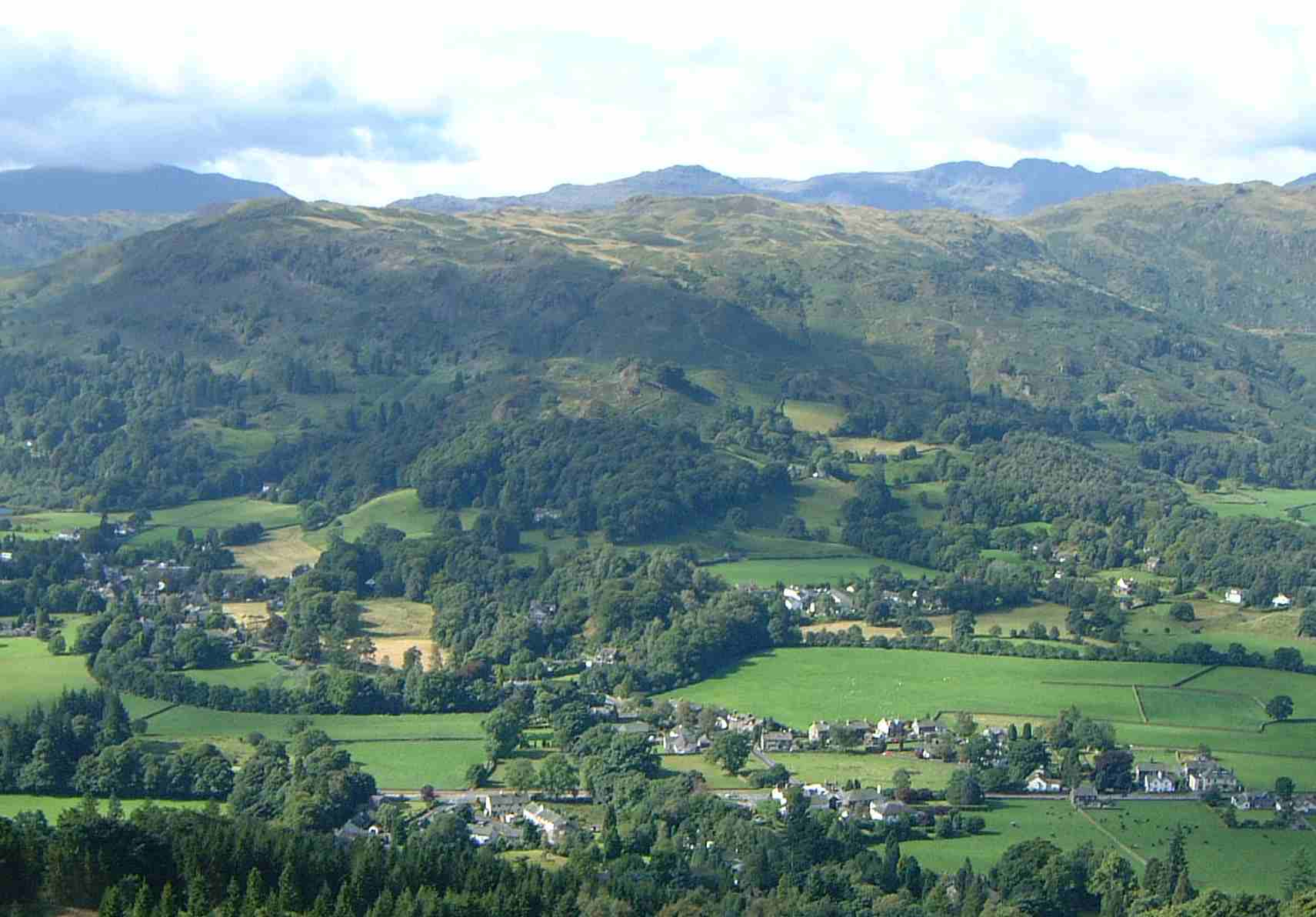
- Silver How above Grasmere village from Stone Arthur

Highest point
- Elevation: 395 m (1,296 ft)
- Prominence: c. 30 m
- Parent peak: Harrison Stickle
- Listing: Wainwright
- Coordinates: 54°27′01″N 3°02′33″W

Geography
- Location within the Lake District
- Location: Cumbria, England
- Parent range: Lake District, Central Fells
- OS grid: NY325066
- Topo map: OS Explorer OL7

Silver How is a fell in the English Lake District, standing over the village of Grasmere. How, derived from the Old Norse word haugr, is a common local term for a hill or mound.

== Topography ==
Silver How forms part of the Blea Rigg ridge and would be considered just another of the many tops on that fell, were it not for Wainwright's decision to accord it a separate chapter in his Pictorial Guide to the Lakeland Fells.

West of Silver How the ridge gains in height over a series of tops, principally Lang How, Swinescar Pike, Little Castle How and Great Castle How, toward Blea Rigg. South and then east of the summit, the ridge narrows and drops to the wooded depression of Red Bank, before rising to its terminus on Loughrigg.

The eastern slopes of Silver How above Grasmere are steep and carry trees to the intake wall at half height, the final rise to the summit being craggy. It is this aspect of the fell, seen to great effect from the lake of Grasmere, which has made it so popular with walkers and photographers where a number of footpaths cross the ridge. There are also crags on the southern side of the ridge, overlooking Chapel Stile in Great Langdale.

The Grasmere flank is drained by Wray Gill, which forms the northern boundary of the fell as it sweeps around to make a direct entry into the lake. Meg's Gill, a tributary of Great Langdale Beck, marks the eastern edge, dropping through a ravine above Elterwater village. Below the fell's eastern extremity of Dow Bank, the depression of Red Bank carries a road from Grasmere to Langdale, a scenic route between the two. Near the road summit is High Close Youth Hostel, set amid woodland.

== Summit ==
There are numerous paths on the fell, which added to the large selection of rounded tops can make navigation confusing. The true summit, marked by a large tumbled cairn, sits directly above Grasmere and provides fine all-round views. Grasmere and its valley provide the highlight, backed by the Fairfield horseshoe. The Langdale Pikes and Coniston Fells are also well seen.

== Ascents ==
Ascents are possible from Grasmere, Chapel Stile, Elterwater and High Close, the climber being spoilt for choice by countless variations. The Grasmere approaches provide fine scenery throughout, whilst that from Elterwater starts in more dreary surroundings. The ascent from Chapel Stile is actually the shortest. Silver How can be combined with Blea Rigg to give a longer walk, making New Dungeon Ghyll (Great Langdale) another possible starting point.
