= Grasmere (village) =

Village in Cumbria, England

Coordinates: 54.45809°N 3.024588°W

- Village
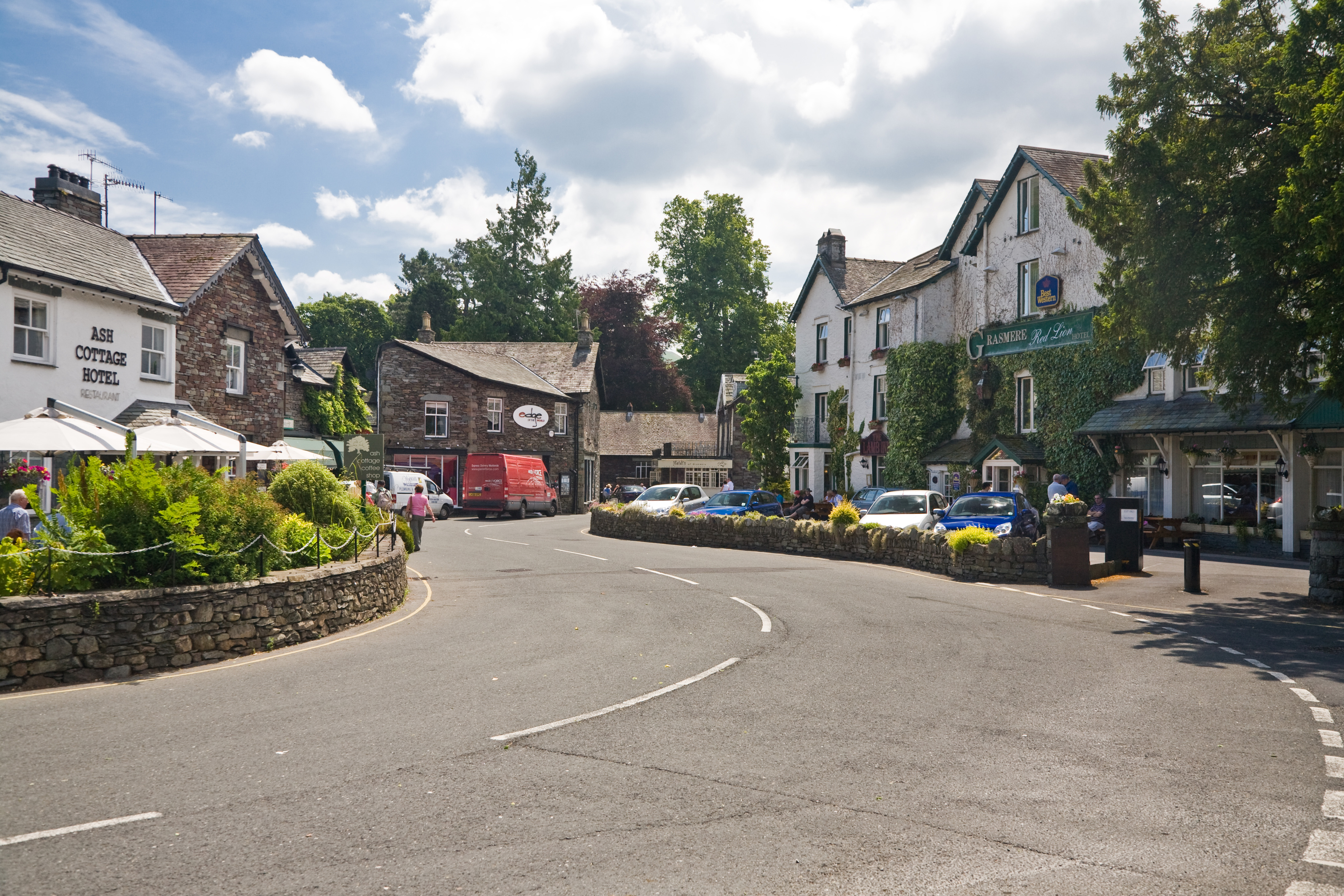
- Grasmere

- Location within Cumbria
- OS grid reference: NY335074
- Civil parish: Lakes
- Unitary authority: Westmorland and Furness
- Ceremonial county: Cumbria
- Region: North West
- Country: England
- Sovereign state: United Kingdom
- Post town: AMBLESIDE
- Postcode district: LA22
- Dialling code: 015394
- Police: Cumbria
- Fire: Cumbria
- Ambulance: North West
- UK Parliament: Westmorland and Lonsdale

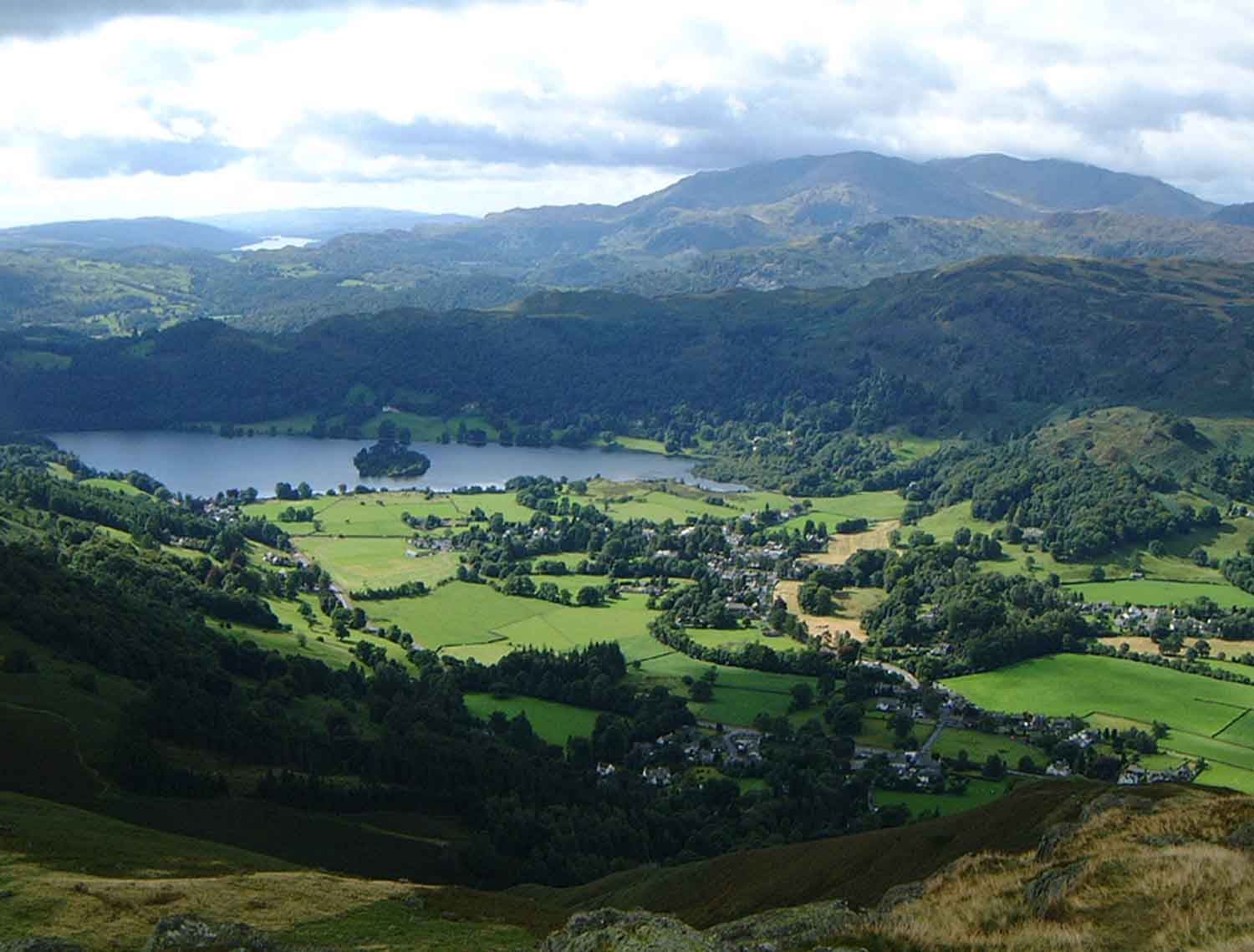
Grasmere village and lake as seen from the fell of Stone Arthur

Grasmere is a village and former civil parish, now in the parish of Lakes, in the Westmorland and Furness district of Cumbria, England, and situated in the centre of the Lake District and named after its adjacent lake. Grasmere lies within the historic county of Westmorland. The Ambleside and Grasmere ward had an estimated population of 4,592 in 2019. William and Dorothy Wordsworth, two of the 'Lake Poets', lived in Grasmere for 14 years and called it "the loveliest spot that man hath ever found."

== Toponymy ==
One possibility is "the lake (mere) flanked by grass." Although early spellings with "Grys-" or "Gris(s)-" might suggest Old Norse "griss", meaning "young pig" as the first element, evidence points to the Old English/Old Norse "gres", meaning grass, with the modern form influenced by Standard English. The medial "-s(s)e-" may, as suggested by Ekwall, point to the Old Norse "gres-saer" or "grass-lake" as the original name. The element "mere" refers to a still extant word meaning "lake" or "pool".

== Geography ==
The village is on the River Rothay, which flows into Grasmere lake about 1/3 mile (500 metres) to the south. The village is overlooked from the north-west by the rocky hill of Helm Crag, popularly known as The Lion and the Lamb or the Old Lady at the organ. These names derive from the shape of rock formations on its summit, depending on the side from which it is viewed.

The several walks that begin in the village include the ascent of Helm Crag, a longer route up to Fairfield, and a moderate 600' (200-metre) ascent to Easedale Tarn. The village is also on the route of Alfred Wainwright's Coast to Coast Walk.

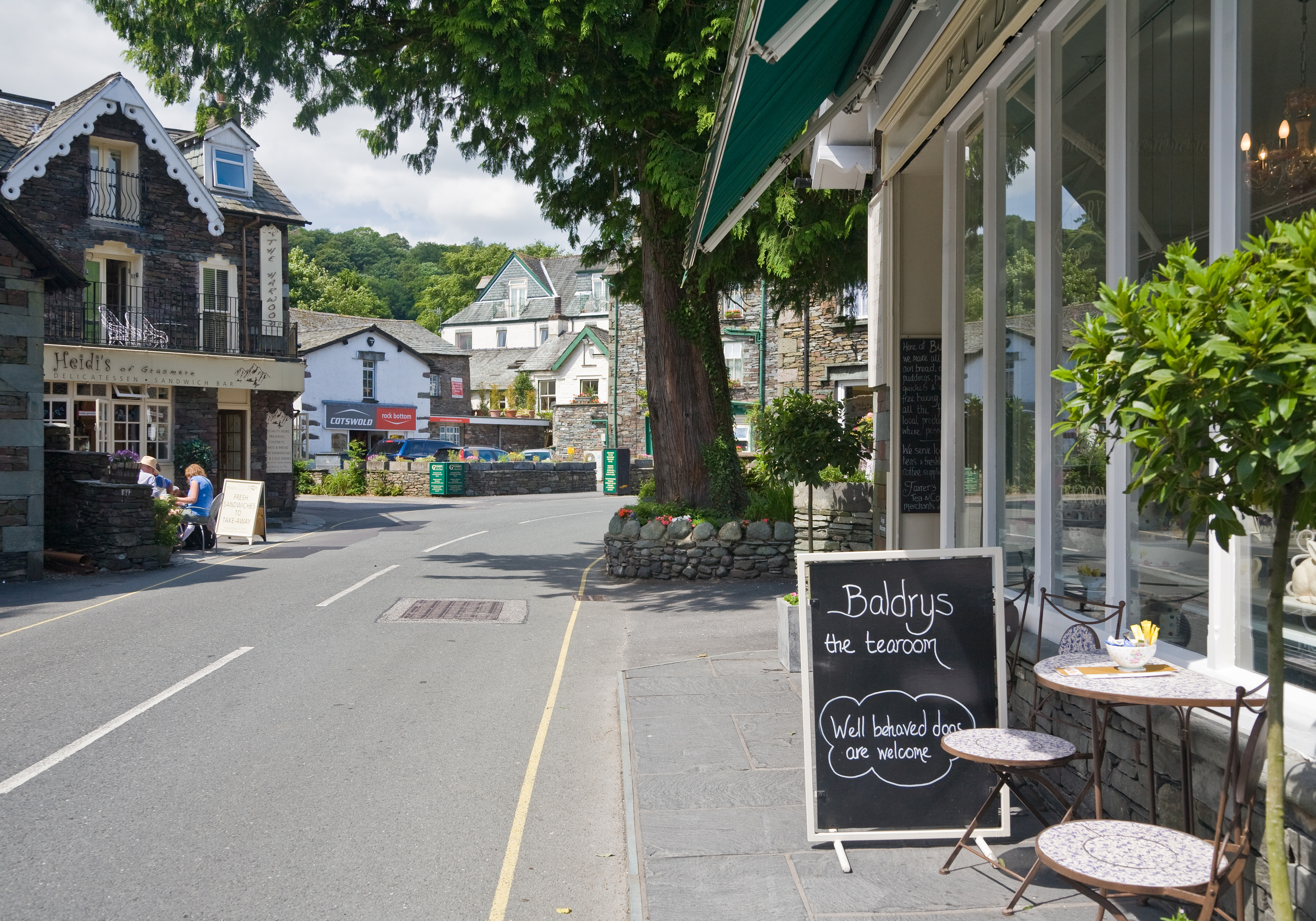
Grasmere Village

The main A591 road connects Grasmere to the Vale of Keswick over Dunmail Raise to the north, and to Ambleside to the south. In other directions, Grasmere is surrounded by high ground. (At Christmas 2015, the A591 was washed away on the Keswick side of Dunmail Raise, causing traffic to make a long detour. It reopened in May 2016.) To the west, a long ridge comes down from High Raise and contains the lesser heights of Blea Rigg and Silver How. To the east, Grasmere is bordered by the western ridge of the Fairfield horseshoe.

== Transport ==
Grasmere lies on the main A591 road between Keswick and Kendal.

All the buses in Grasmere are run by Stagecoach.

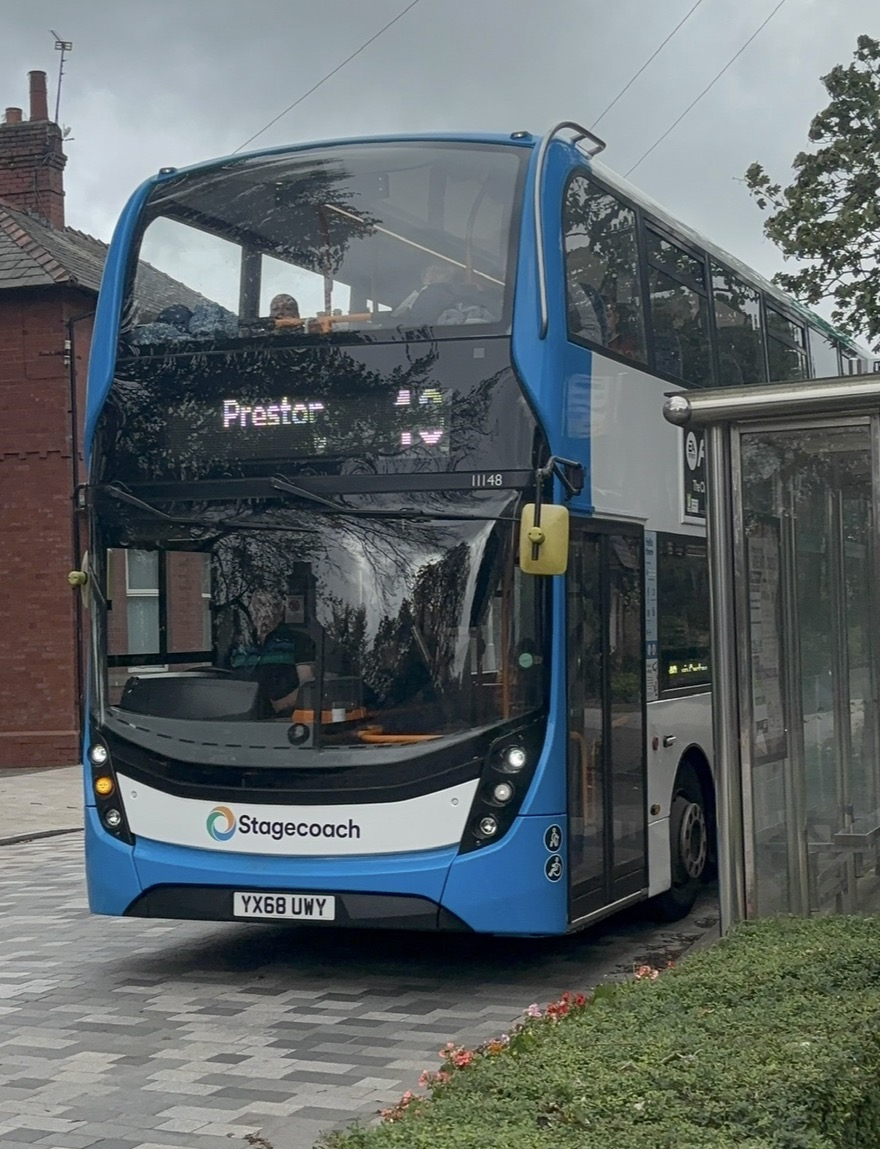
Stagecoach bus

The nearest railway station is Windermere, located nine miles (14 kilometres) away; the mentioned bus routes provide direct access to and from the station. Windermere has trains to Manchester Airport and a shuttle route to Oxenholme Lake District. Services are run by Northern and use the Class 195.

== Community events ==
=== Rushbearing ===
Grasmere's Rushbearing Ceremony, centred on St Oswald's Church, has ancient origins. The present-day ceremony is an annual event which features a procession through the village with bearings made from rushes and flowers. In this procession there are also six Maids of Honour, a brass band, the church choir, and others carrying their own decorated rush-bearing.

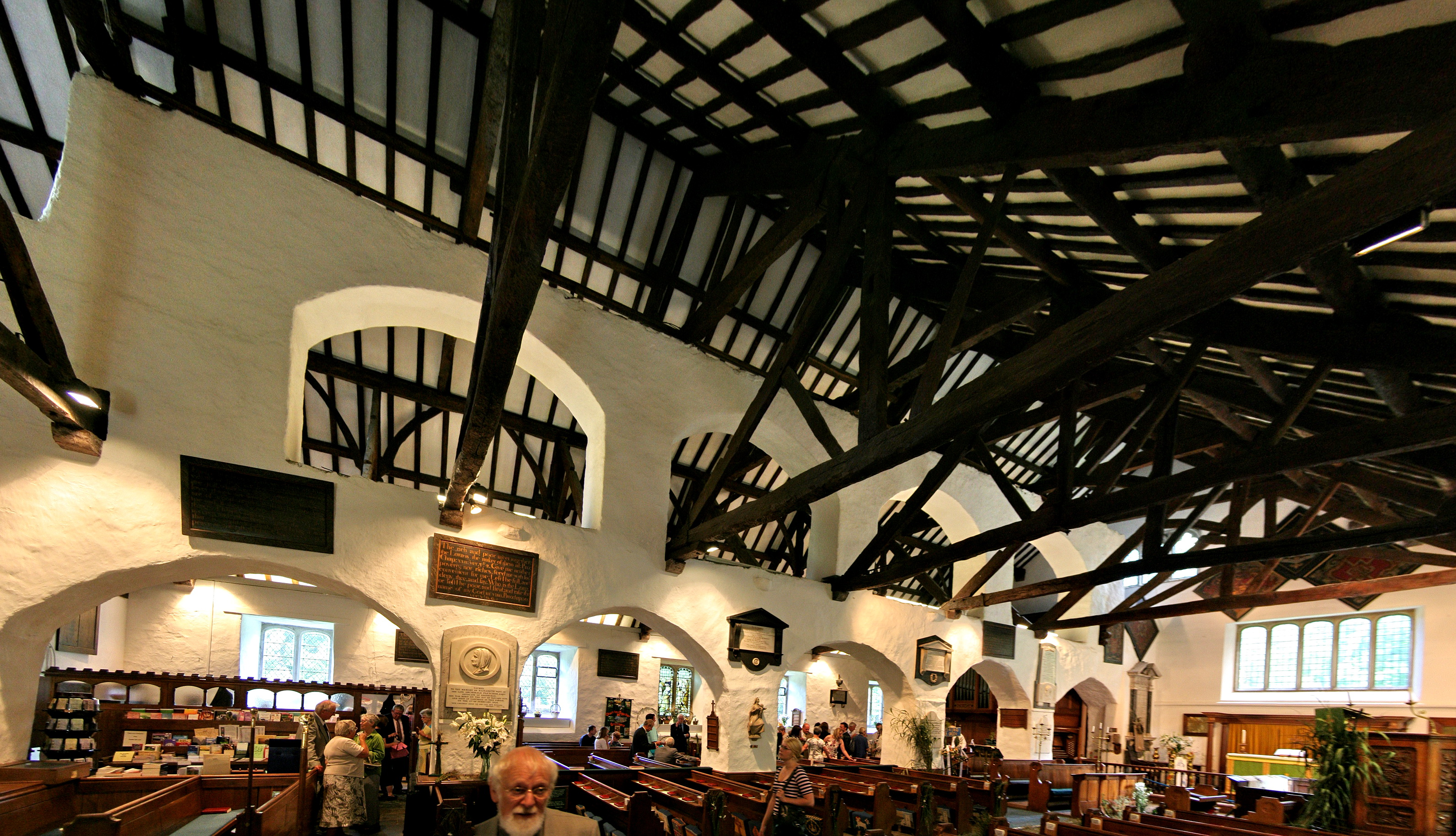
St Oswald's Church, decorated for the Rushbearing Day

=== Sports ===
The annual Grasmere Sports in August were first held in 1852. Participants compete in a variety of sports, including Cumberland wrestling, fell running and hound trails (similar to drag hunting).

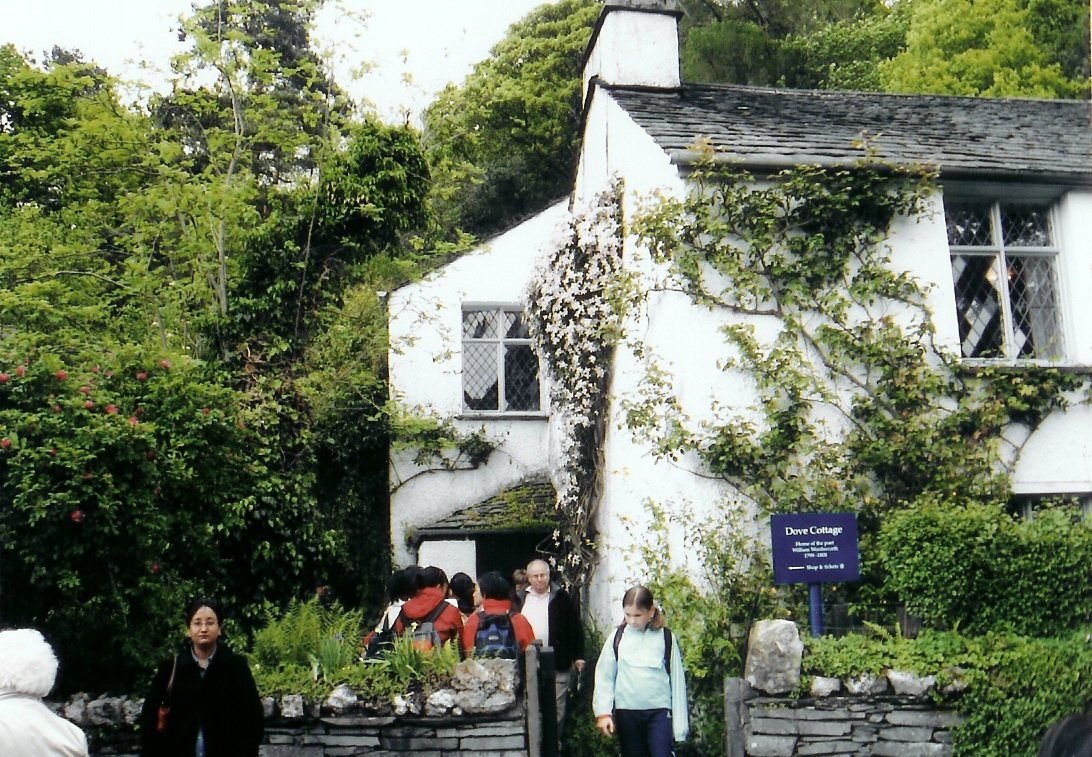
Dove Cottage

=== Sweetmeats ===
Grasmere Gingerbread existed in several forms until 2009 when a trademark was obtained by one of the producers. The exclusive version is made from a "secret recipe" popularised by Sarah Nelson (1815–1904). By the early 19th century, Grasmere gingerbread was being sold as fairings and as a popular seller in its own right. Poet Dorothy Wordsworth wrote in 1803 that she and her brother William craved the gingerbread.

Grasmere contains the winner of the "Get Started Award 2014" awarded by the Institute of Enterprise and Entrepreneurs: the Chocolate Cottage.

=== Religious ===
Until September 2013, Grasmere's three main church parishes (Catholic, Church of England and Methodist) gathered three times a year to celebrate mass in the Catholic Church of Our Lady of the Wayside. Quakers also hold meetings of worship in Grasmere.

=== Community Groups ===
Grasmere has many thriving community groups, including a branch of the Women's Institute which meets regularly.

== Government ==
The Lakes were governed by an urban district council, before becoming part of the Lakes Urban District in 1934. The parish was abolished on 1 April 1974 to form Lakes. In 1961 the parish had a population of 1029. Grasmere is part of the Westmorland and Lonsdale parliamentary constituency, and is represented by the Liberal Democrat MP Tim Farron. Grasmere has lost population since the 1960s.

== In art and literature ==
George Pickering painted many views around Grasmere, and an engraving of one of these, Grassmere Lake and Village, Westmorland, was published in Fisher's Drawing Room Sketch Book, 1834, accompanied by a humorous sketch by Letitia Elizabeth Landon about a lover of poetry who, given a legacy, buys a property here only to find extraordinary steps would be required to make life bearable.

Lydia Sigourney's poem Grassmere and Rydal-Water. published in Pleasant Memories of Pleasant Lands, 1842 records her visit in that year and her reception by Wordsworth.

== Notable people ==
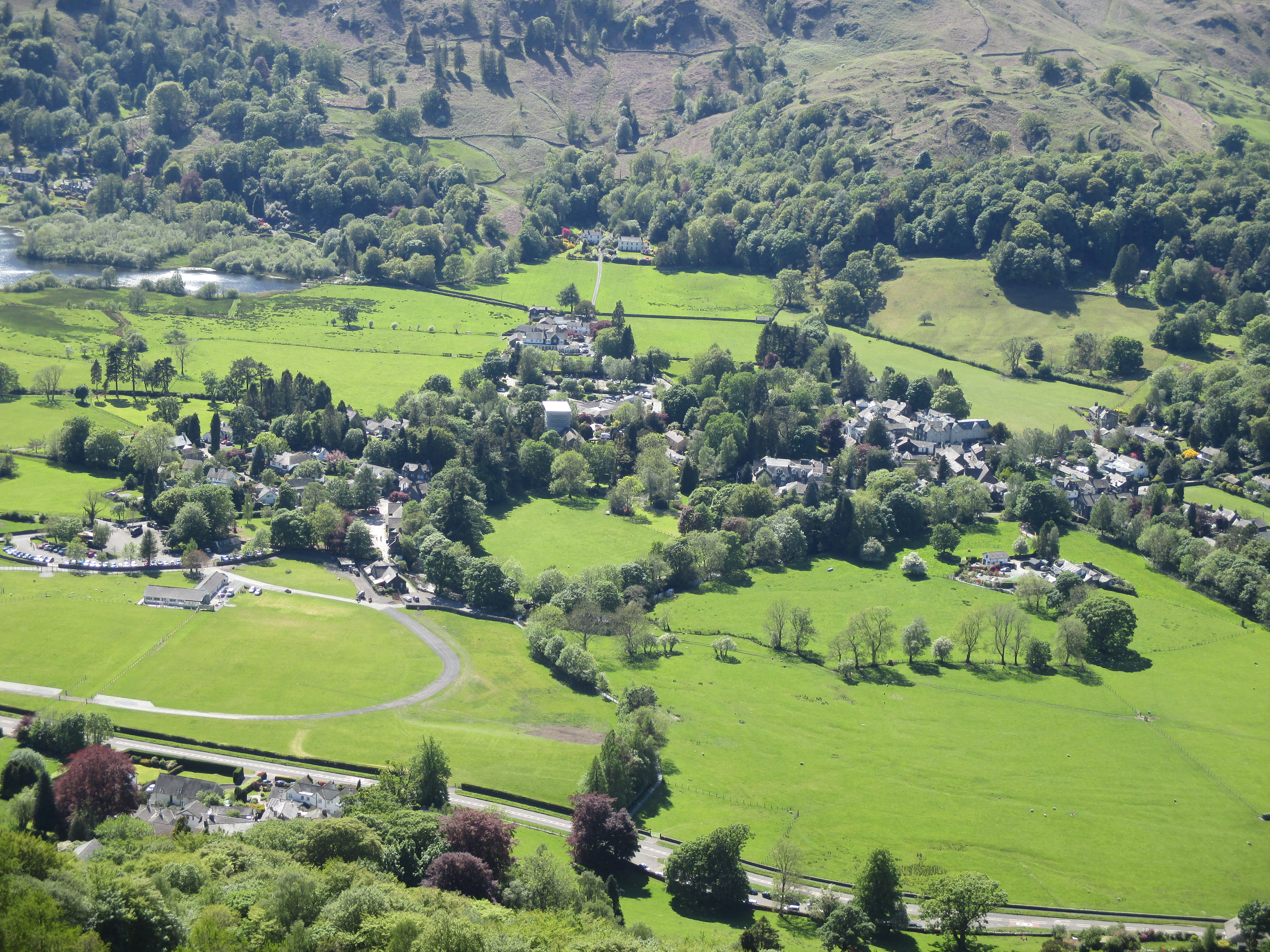
Grasmere seen from Heron Pike

In birth order:

- William Wordsworth (1770–1850), poet, lived in Dove Cottage with his sister Dorothy Wordsworth (1771–1855), in the hamlet of Townend, outside Grasmere, from 1799. He breakfasted with Sir Walter Scott at The Swan, an inn on today's A591, whose sign quotes his line, "Who does not know the famous Swan?" In 1808 he moved to Allan Bank then to Rydal Mount. He, his wife and his sister are buried in the churchyard of St Oswald's.
- Samuel Taylor Coleridge (1772–1834), poet, spent time at Dove Cottage and is said to have muttered stanzas for The Rime of the Ancient Mariner while walking across the nearby fells.
- Thomas De Quincey (1785–1859), man of letters, rented Dove Cottage after the Wordsworths left.
- Paul Frederick de Quincey (1828–1894), son of Thomas and a New Zealand politician, was born at Grasmere.
- William Angus Knight (1836–1916), a Scottish academic, compiled an 11-volume Wordsworth's Works and Life (1881–1889) and presented his library of Wordsworth materials to Dove Cottage.
- William Archibald Spooner (1844–1930), an Oxford University academic and instigator of spoonerisms, was buried here, near the house of his wife's family, How Foot.
- Canon Hardwicke Drummond Rawnsley (1851–1920), co-founder of the National Trust, lived in Grasmere in 1915–1920.
- John Haden Badley (1865–1967), educationalist and founder of Bedales School, spent time with his sisters at their Grasmere home, Winterseeds.
- Brigadier Gordon Hutchinson Osmaston (1898–1990), a founder member of the Himalayan Club and former director of the Survey of India, taught later at Huyton Hill School and lived in Grasmere.
- Charles Morris (1898–1990), philosopher and Leeds University vice-chancellor, died at Grasmere.
- The husband-and-wife artists William Heaton Cooper (1903–1995), landscape painter, and Ophelia Gordon Bell (1915–1975), sculptor, lived and are buried at Grasmere.
- Frederic Yates (1854–1919), painter, was living at Cote How near Grasmere (1900–1906) when he painted the future United States president Woodrow Wilson and John Haden Badley.
- Robert Woof (1931–2005), academic, was the first keeper of the collections of the William Wordsworth Museum at Dove Cottage.
- Bob Barratt (1938 or 1939–2004) was the founder of the Grasmere Records label for brass band and organ music.
- Sting (born 1951), musician, lead singer and songwriter of The Police, owns a house near the village.
