= Grasmere (lake) =

Lake in Cumbria, England

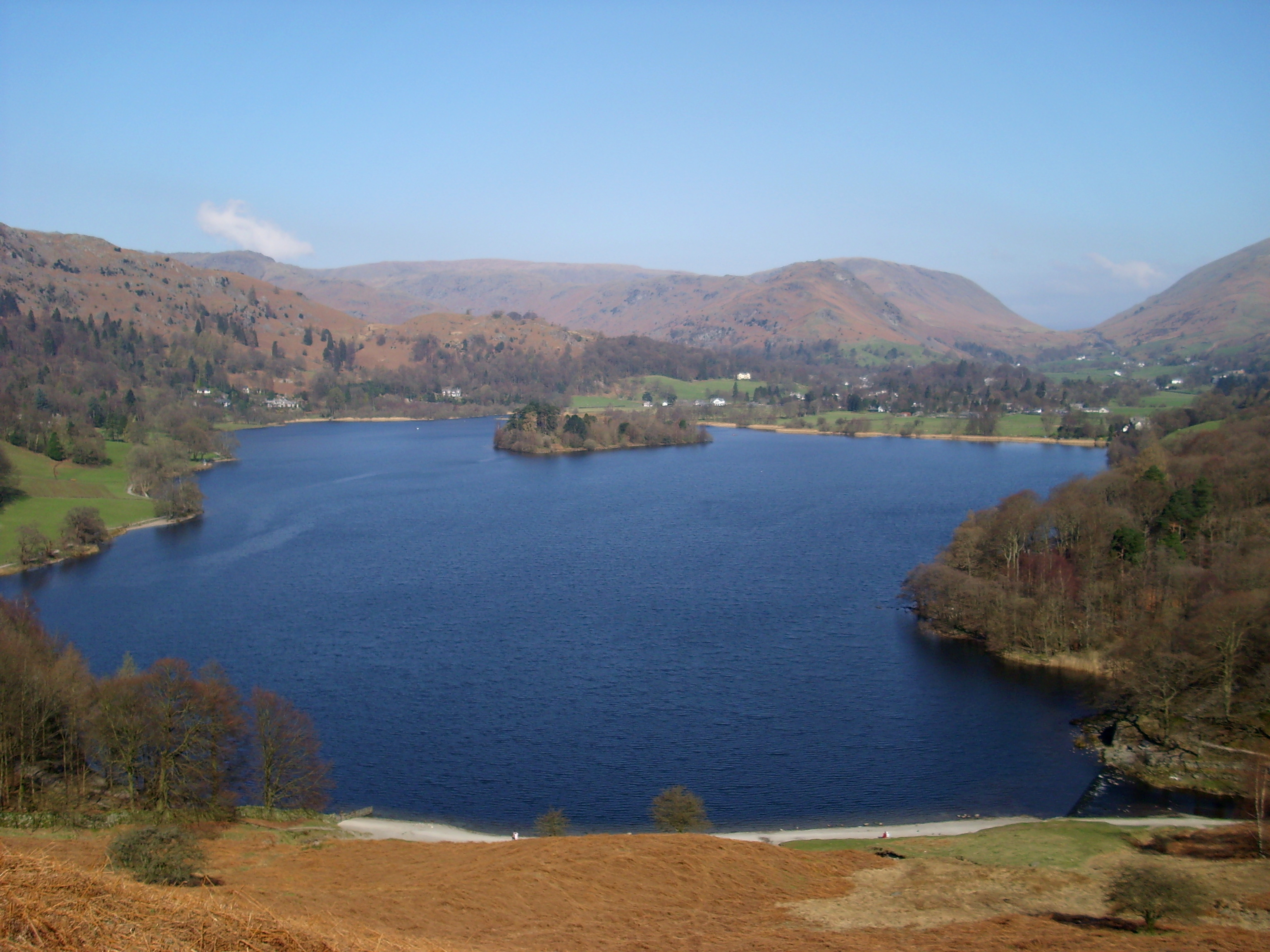
- View from Loughrigg Terrace, looking across the lake towards Grasmere village

- Location in the Lake District National Park Location in South Lakeland, Cumbria
- Location: Lake District, Cumbria
- Coordinates: 54.448834°N 3.020897°W
- Primary inflows: River Rothay
- Primary outflows: River Rothay
- Basin countries: England
- Max. length: 1680 yd (1540 m)
- Max. width: 700 yd (640 m)
- Surface area: 0.24 mi² (0.62k m²)
- Max. depth: 70 ft (21 m)
- Surface elevation: 208 ft (63 m)
- Islands: 1

Grasmere is one of the smaller lakes of the English Lake District, in the county of Cumbria. It gives its name to the village of Grasmere, famously associated with the poet William Wordsworth and his sister Dorothy Wordsworth, which is immediately to the north of the lake.

The lake is 1680 yd (1540 m) long and 700 yd (640 m) wide, covering an area of 0.24 mi^{2} (0.62 km^{2}). It has a maximum depth of 70 ft (21 m) and an elevation above sea level of 208 ft (62 m). The lake is both fed and drained by the River Rothay, which flows through the village before entering the lake, and then exits downstream into nearby Rydal Water, beyond which it continues into Windermere.

The waters of the lake are leased by the Lowther Estate to the National Trust. The waters are navigable, with private boats allowed and rowing boats for hire, but powered boats are prohibited.

The lake contains a single island, known as Grasmere Island or simply The Island. In 2017 this island was bequeathed to the National Trust. This gift has particular significance to the National Trust, as the organisation was founded in response to the sale of the same island to a private bidder in 1893. Canon Hardwicke Rawnsley felt that such a location should instead be in public ownership, and soon afterwards started the National Trust with Octavia Hill and Robert Hunter.

== Toponymy ==
'The lake flanked by grass'; 'gres', 'mere'. Early spellings in 'Grys-', 'Gris(s)-' might suggest ON 'griss' 'young pig' as 1st el.[ement], but the weight of the evidence points to OE/ON 'gres' 'grass', with the modern form influenced by Standard English.... The medial '-s(s)e-' may, as suggested by Eilert Ekwall in DEPN, point to ON 'gres-saer' 'grass-lake' as the original name.

Plus the element "'mere' OE, ModE 'lake, 'pool'". (OE is Old English up to around AD 1100; ON is Old Norse.)

== General and cited references ==
- Parker, John Wilson (2004). An Atlas of the English Lakes: Pictorial Charts Compiled from an Exploration of the Shorelines of the Lake District on Foot and by Canoe. Milnthorpe, Cumbria, UK: Cicerone Press. ISBN 1-85284-355-1. OCLC 52067003.
