= Red Screes =

Mountain in the English Lake District, Cumbria, England

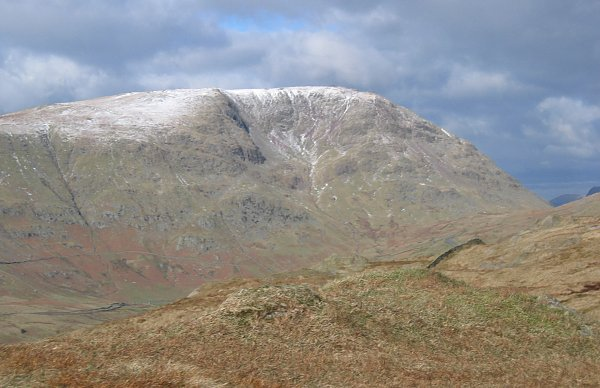
- Red Screes seen from Wansfell summit

Highest point
- Elevation: 776 m (2,546 ft)
- Prominence: 260 m (850 ft)
- Parent peak: Fairfield
- Listing: Marilyn, Wainwright
- Coordinates: 54°28′12″N 2°56′00″W

Geography
- Location within the Lake District
- Location: Cumbria, England
- Parent range: Lake District, Eastern Fells
- OS grid: NY396087
- Topo map: OS Landrangers 89, 90, Explorer OL7

Red Screes is a fell in the English Lake District, situated between the villages of Patterdale and Ambleside. It may be considered an outlier of the Fairfield group in the Eastern Fells, but is separated from its neighbours by low cols. This gives Red Screes an independence which is reflected in its prominence.

== Topography ==
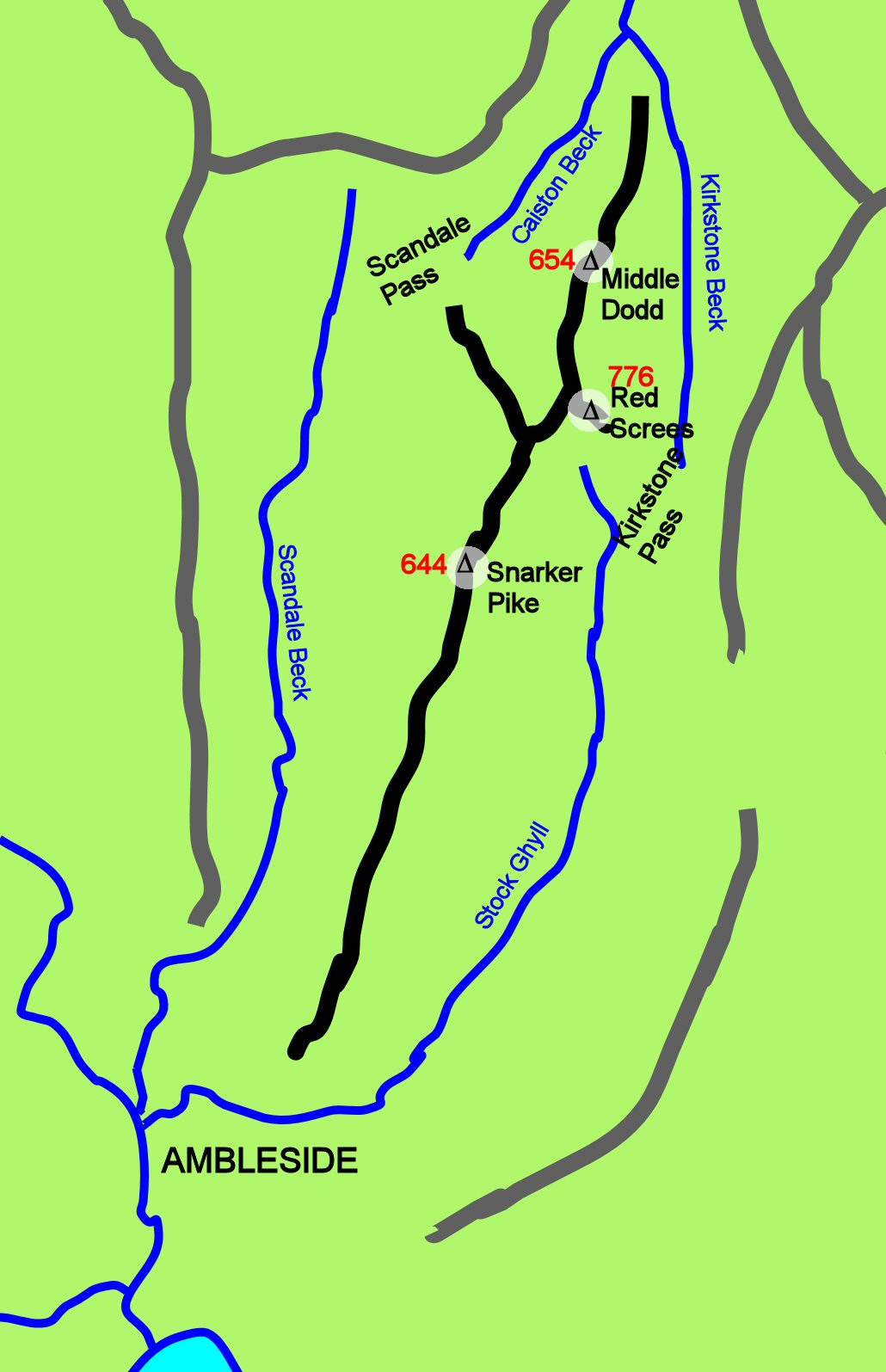
Sketch map of Red Screes

Red Screes is a ridge of high ground which runs for nearly 7 kilometres (4 miles) in a north north-easterly direction from the town of Ambleside, and reaches a maximum height of 776 metres (2,546 ft). This ridge narrows at either end, giving it the shape of a long upturned boat. It is separated from neighbouring fells by Scandale Pass to the west (c.516 metres; 1,690 ft) and Kirkstone Pass to the east (455 metres; 1,493 ft). These two low cols mean that Red Screes is seen as an independent fell when viewed from the south of the Lake District. They also give the fell sufficient prominence to be classified as a Marilyn. There are two minor subsidiary tops: Snarker Pike (644 metres; 2,113 ft) on the south ridge and Middle Dodd (654 metres; 2,146 ft) on the north ridge. Each of these, however, has very little prominence above the ridge (less than 10 metres (33 ft)).

Red Screes forms part of the main watershed of the Lake District, which runs in an east-west direction across the summit and the two adjacent cols. All streams to the north eventually flow into the Solway Firth, and those to the south flow into Morecambe Bay. The boundaries of Red Screes are formed by the four streams in the adjacent valleys. To the south, Scandale Beck drains the western slopes and Stock Ghyll the eastern ones. These both join the River Rothay a few yards apart just to the west of Ambleside. To the north, Caiston Beck drains the western slopes and Kirkstone Beck the eastern ones, and these join where they reach more level ground at the end of the ridge. Thus the boundaries of Red Screes are formed symmetrically by four valleys, with the fell between them, rather than rising at the head of any one of them.

The broad southern ridge rises gently for four and a half kilometres (2 3/4 miles) from Ambleside. The lower slopes have been planted with small areas of mixed woodland and are extensively compartmentalised by an array of dry stone walls. North of the summit, the ridge narrows at Smallthwaite Band, before widening again to the summit of Middle Dodd. Beyond this, the descent is steep and rough though mainly grassy.

The western flanks are also rough, mainly grassy with some rock outcrops, rising steeply from Scandale and from Caiston Glen. The eastern side has been eroded by two steep corries (known at coves in Cumbria). These give it a more rocky appearance, with two miles of screeslope looming above almost the full length of Kirkstone Pass, and well seen from the A592 road which crosses the pass. It is from this view that the fell takes its name. Prominent on Ordnance Survey maps is Kilnshaw Chimney, although in reality this is just a narrow gully beneath the summit.

== Summit ==
The summit area is a broad plateau with a dressing of grass and stones. Two unnamed corries are cut into the eastern face and between them a flat topped promontory juts out with the highest point on its northern edge. A number of large cairns have been built and an Ordnance Survey triangulation column stands nearby. Adjacent to that is a circular stone shelter. A few yards to the south is Red Screes Tarn, a small permanent waterbody with no plant life in evidence. A number of smaller pools can be found after rain. The view is excellent in all directions. Helvellyn is seen to good advantage, beyond the crags of Dove Crag and Fairfield and over Deepdale Hause. High Street and the Far Eastern Fells are seen over the immediate bulk of Caudale Moor. To the west the skyline is formed by the distant Coniston, Bowfell and Scafell fells. The immediate view down the eastern face to the Kirkstone Inn is spectacular.

== Ascents ==
Well-used paths approach the summit from four directions. From the south a track up the southern ridge gives convenient access directly from Ambleside, leaving the road towards ‘The Struggle’ about one mile north-east of the town. This leads over Snarker Pike before reaching the summit. From the east a very steep and winding path straight up from Kirkstone Pass is very popular with visitors. Considerable erosion to this path has been repaired by laying stone blocks along much of its length. From the west the path from Scandale Pass gives an easier approach, and may be gained from either Ambleside, or from the north via Caiston Glen. From the north a more direct approach over Middle Dodd is possible, but the way is very steep and unmarked. A path appears near the top of Middle Dodd, and then leads along the northern ridge to the summit of Red Screes.

== Geology ==
All the rocks of Red Screes are part of the Borrowdale Volcanic Group, formed on the margin of an ancient continent during a period of intense volcanic activity during the Caradoc epoch of the Ordovician period, roughly 450 million years ago.

The lowest (and oldest) rocks, around the base of the fell and on the southern half of the south ridge, belong to the Seathwaite Fell Sandstone Formation. This consists mainly of deposits of bedded volcaniclastic sandstone and siltstone, deposited rapidly in shallow water at a late stage during the volcanic activity. South of Snarker Pike there are more than 800 m of these sediments. Interbedded pyroclastic rocks vary from thin beds of fine tuff to thick units of breccia, and reveal some ongoing volcanic activity during the period of deposition.

Overlying those deposits are rocks of the Lincomb Tarns Tuff Formation, found on the eastern and western sides of the fell and the top of the southern ridge. These rocks are predominantly dacitic lapilli tuff, interpreted as welded ignimbrite. Interbeds of thin tuff and of volcaniclastic sandstone occur. This formation is the most widespread in the volcanic rocks of the Lake District; it seems that the whole district was buried beneath at least 150 m (and in places up to 800 m) of densely welded ignimbrite. It must have been a series of eruptions of truly exceptional magnitude, as viscous and highly gaseous silica-rich magma exploded on eruption.

Intrusions of the Borrowdale Sill Suite are found on Red Screes within both the rock formations just described. These andesite sills were intruded during the volcanic activity of the Caradoc Epoch, and may represent one of the last episodes when magma rose to or near the surface that is preserved in the volcanic rocks of the Lake District.

Overlying the Lincomb Tarns Formation are rocks of the Esk Pike Sandstone Formation. On Red Screes these are found high on the northern ridge. In this area the formation consists of alternating thick pebbly sandstone beds and thin beds of finer-grained sandstone and mudstone. These represent a return to water-borne sedimentation in an environment of rivers and lakes.

The highest and youngest rocks of the Borrowdale volcanic sequence found on Red Screes belong to the Middle Dodd Dacite Formation, on and north of the top of Middle Dodd, and with a small area along the edge of the northern corrie of Red Screes. The rock is white-weathered dacite lava, and was formed by the eruption of viscous or semi-mobile lava rich in silica from a steep-sided volcano, perhaps filling in hollows on an old erosion surface.

Drift deposits of glacial till derived from the last ice-age have accumulated on the lower slopes of Red Screes, and on the top of the ridge.

== Mining and quarrying ==
Kirkstone Quarry (named Pets Quarry on Ordnance Survey maps) is prominent on the southeast side of Red Screes, below Kirkstone Pass. It has produced green and blue-black slate for building and architectural purposes. The quarry went into administration in 2012. At present Burlington Stone markets three types of stone called Kirkstone Brathay Blue/Black, Kirkstone Sea Green and Kirkstone Silver Green. Quarrying took place within the Seathwaite Fell Sandstone Formation. The green slate was formed from fine-grained sedimentary rock within that formation, which was later metamorphosed to form slate.

The remains of a small quarry on the western slopes of the fell can still be seen. This was used to extract stones for wall-building, and even the remains of a sled-track exist, leading down to a series of field walls in Scandale.

There is evidence of mining in Caiston Glen, with the mouth of a level opening about halfway up the beck. This was an unsuccessful trial for lead and extends about 80 feet (24 m) into the fellside. There is a further small working nearby.

There are also the remains of a trial for copper on the eastern flank, a 120-foot (40 m) level being driven into the fell from close to the modern road.

== Names ==
Red Screes is an example of a fell which has taken the name of one of its sides. The screes which cover the steep eastern slopes above the Kirkstone Pass appear to have a reddish colouration.

Snarker Pike is probably ‘snake peak’ from Old English snaca, a snake, plus pike. In 1764 its name was recorded as Snake Pike. Originally it may have been Snake How (from snaca plus dialect how(e), a hill or mound), which became contracted to Snarker and then had ‘pike’ added. It seems strange that this hill should be associated with snakes, though adders are not uncommon in the Lake District. Pike is a dialect work for a peak or summit, from either Old English pīc or Old Norse pík. This is frequently used for the summit of a fell, and then for the fell itself. Some of these names are ancient, but many are more modern.

Middle Dodd is the central of the three dodds as seen from Hartsop Hall: (Low) Hartsop Dodd, Middle Dodd and High Hartsop Dodd. These names have nothing to do with relative heights but refer to their positions in the valley. Dod or dodd is a dialect word of unknown origin, but common in hill names in the Lake District and the Scottish Borders for bare rounded summits, either free standing or subsidiary shoulders to higher neighbours.

== Image gallery ==
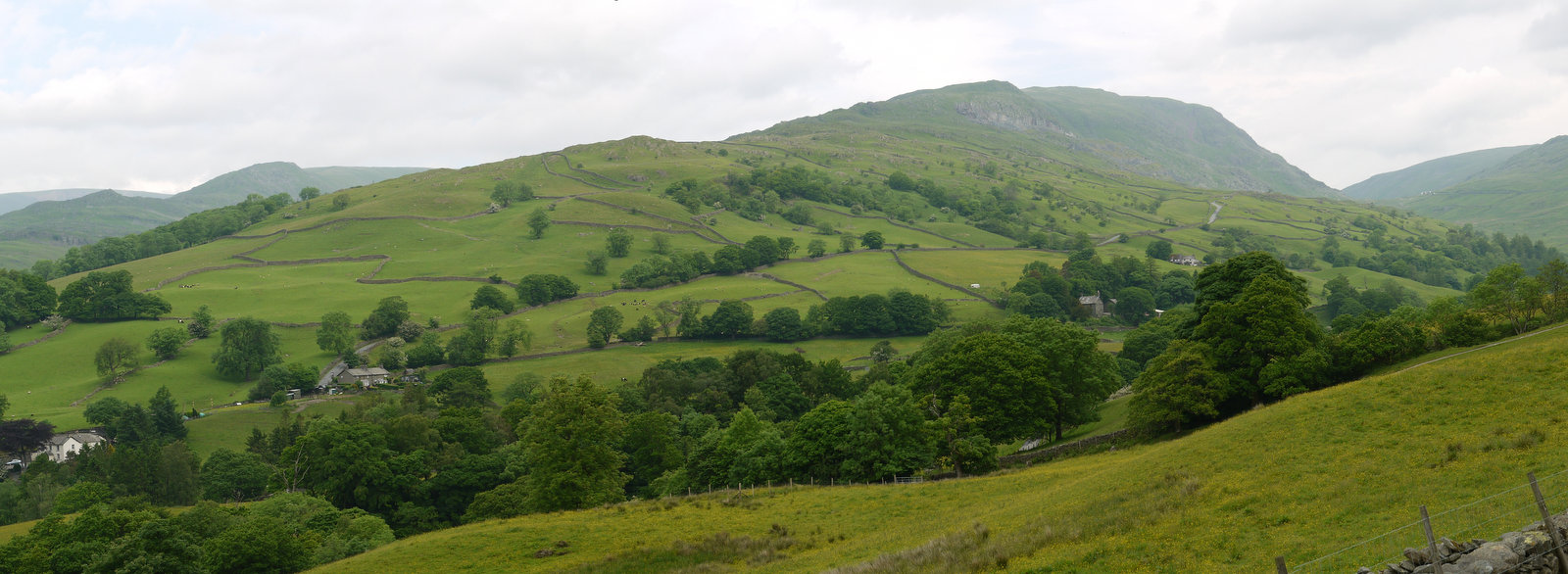
Looking up the broad south ridge of Red Screes to Snarker Pike and the summit, from near Ambleside.

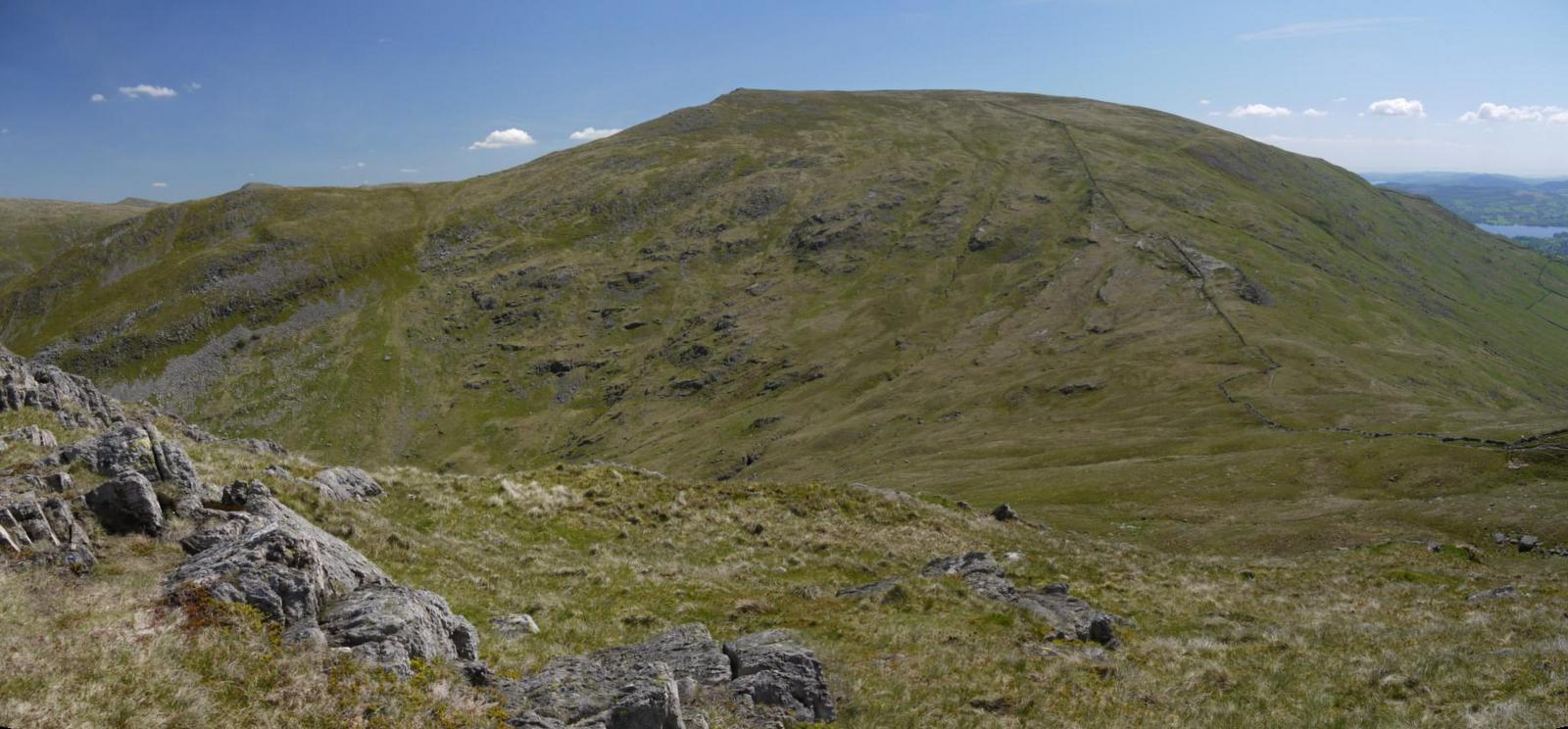
Looking over Scandale Pass to Red Screes. Middle Dodd is on the left.
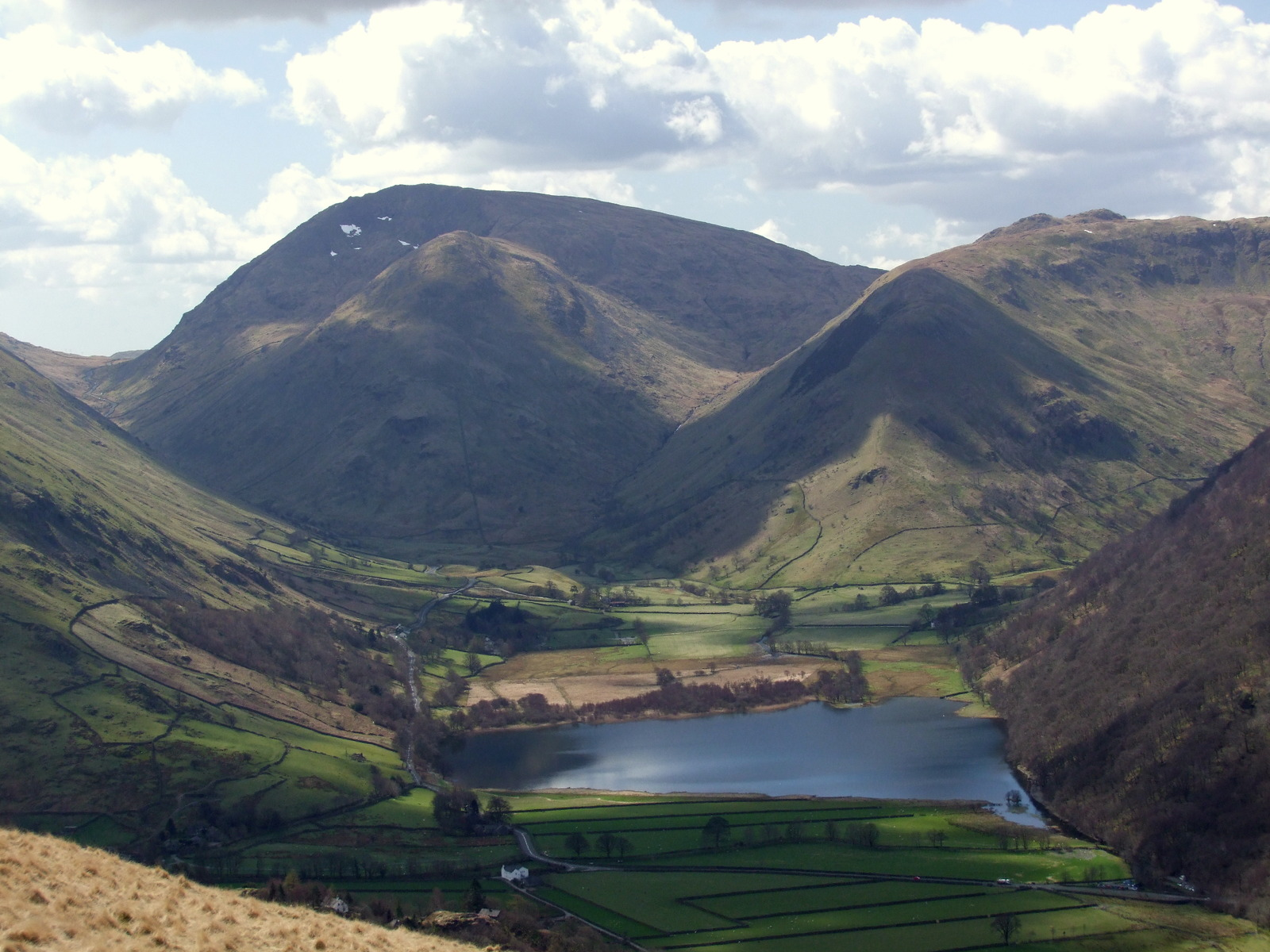
Red Screes and Middle Dodd seen beyond Brothers Water from the Patterdale Valley. On the right is High Hartsop Dodd.

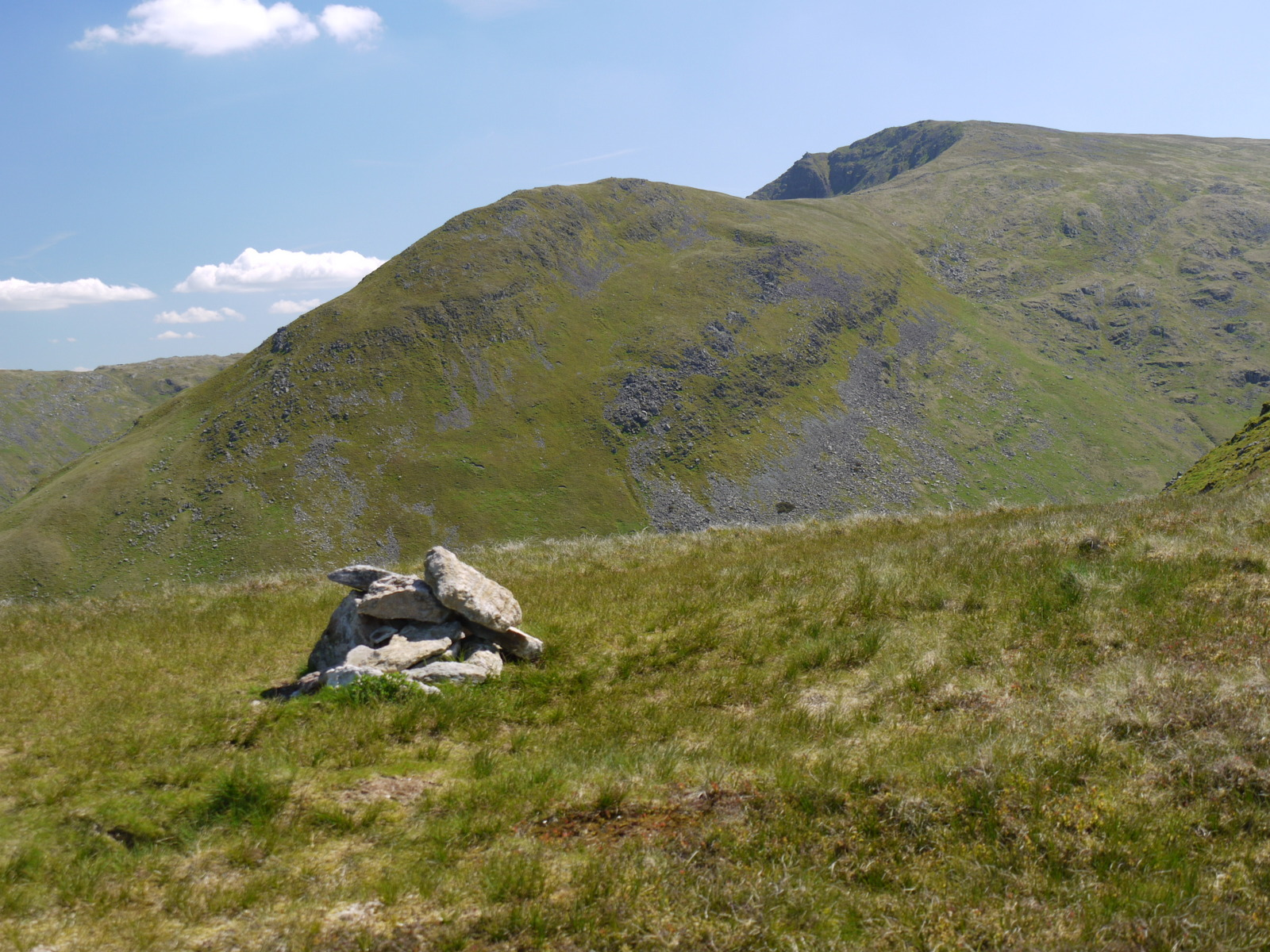
The north ridge: Middle Dodd and Red Screes, seen from Hartsop-above-How

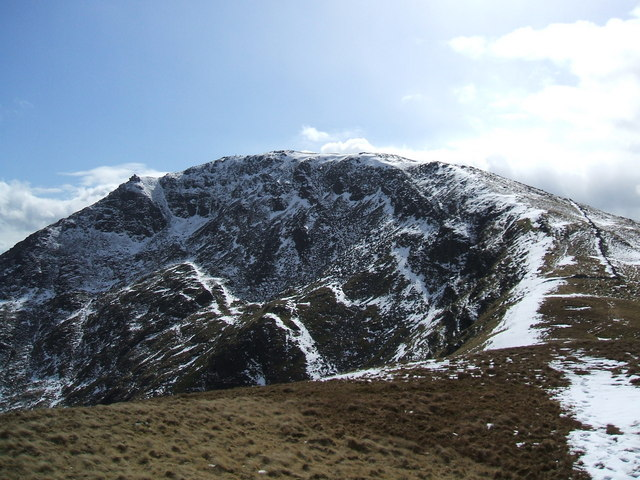
Looking up to the summit of Red Screes from Middle Dodd

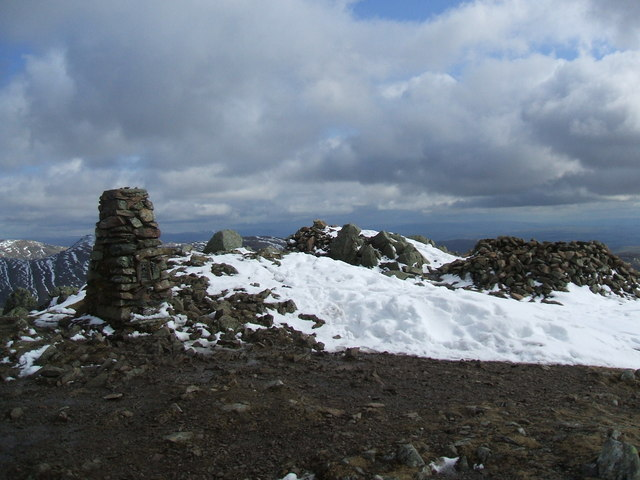
The summit of Red Screes

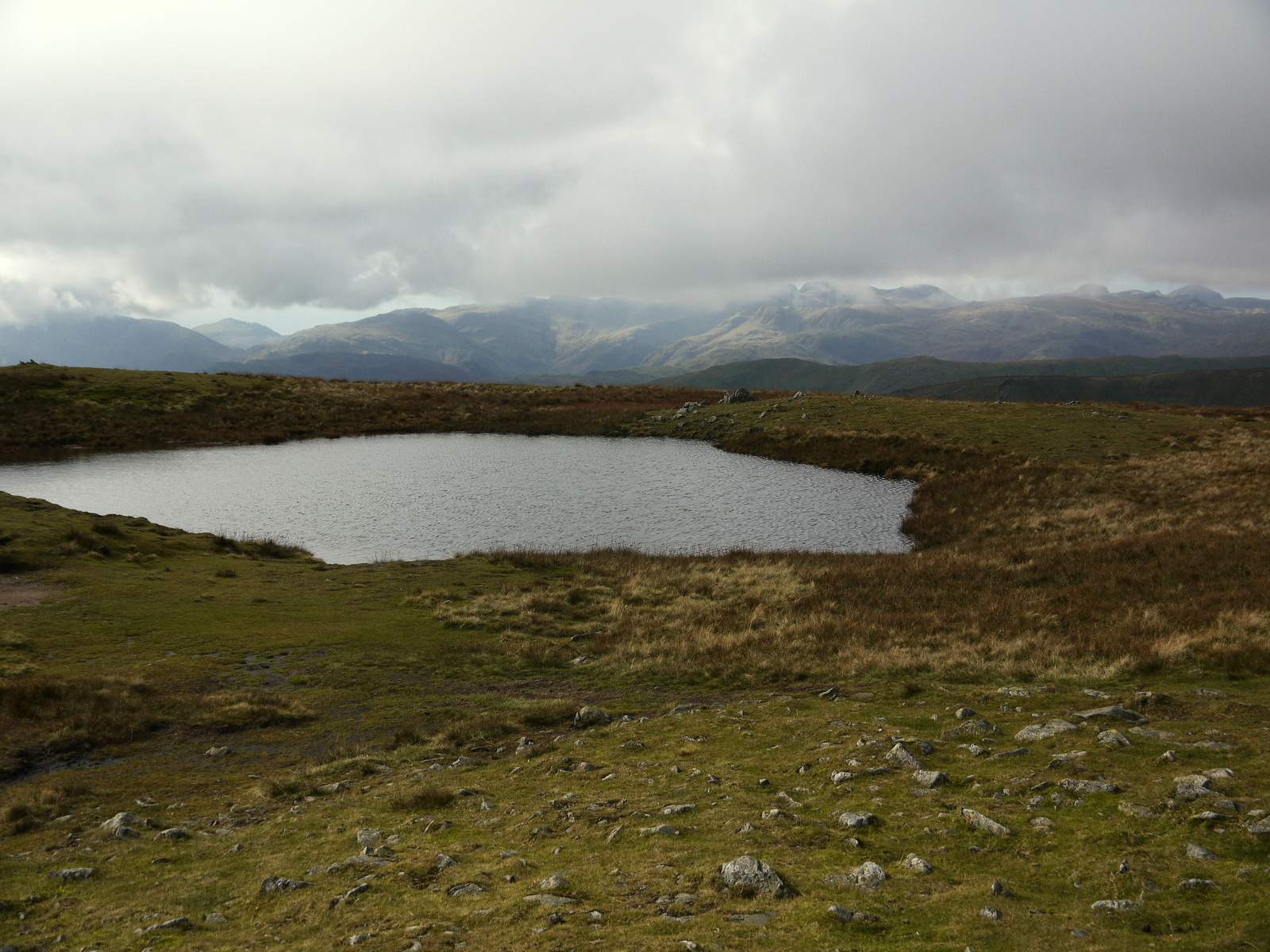
The summit Tarn on Red Screes

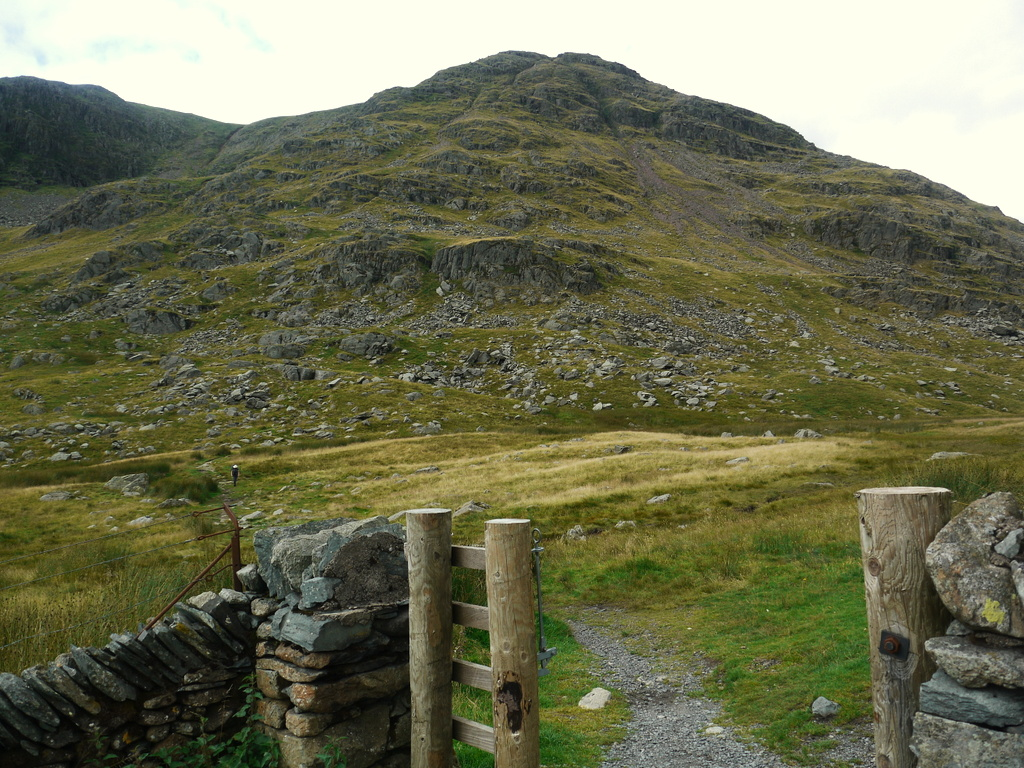
Red Screes seen from the car park on Kirkstone Pass

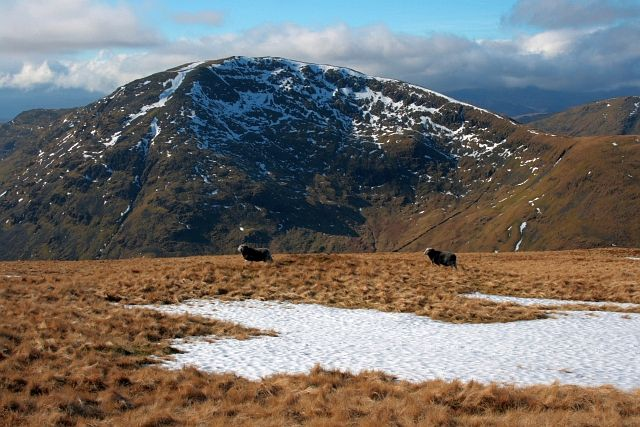
Red Screes seen from Cauldale Moor. Notice the unnamed cove below the summit.

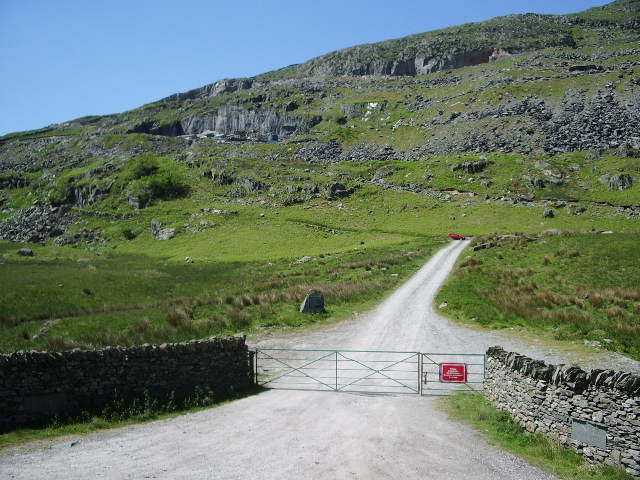
Entrance to Kirkstone Quarry
