= Windermere =

Largest natural lake in England

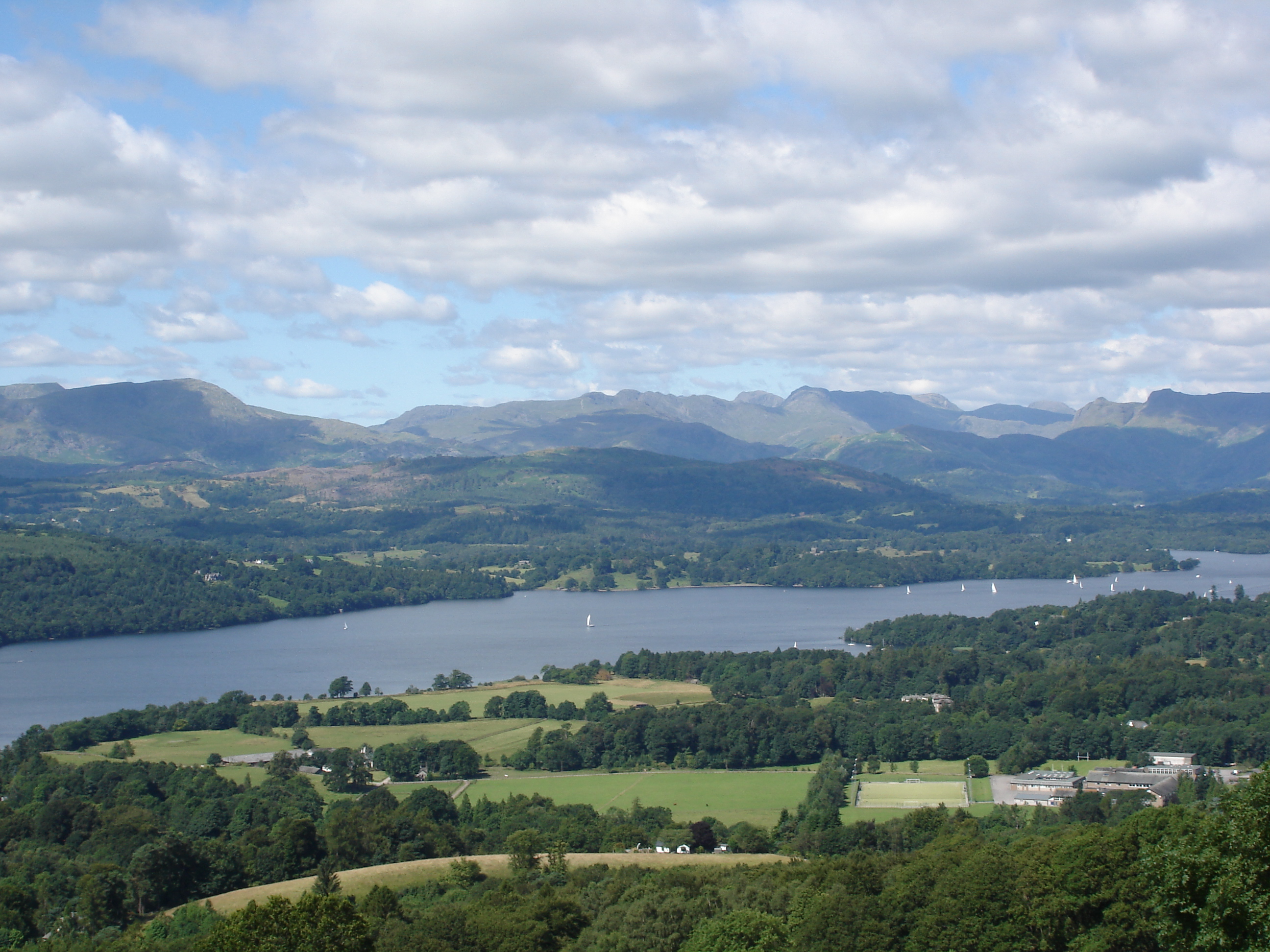
- View of Windermere

- Location in the Lake District National Park Location in South Lakeland, Cumbria Location in the United Kingdom
- Location: Cumbria, England
- Coordinates: 54°21′30″N 2°56′10″W
- Type: Ribbon mere
- Primary inflows: Brathay, Rothay, Trout Beck, Cunsey Beck
- Primary outflows: River Leven
- Basin countries: United Kingdom
- Max. length: 11.23 miles (18.07 km)
- Max. width: 0.93 miles (1.50 km)
- Surface area: 14.73 km^{2} (5.69 sq mi)
- Max. depth: 219 ft (67 m)
- Surface elevation: 128 ft (39 m)
- Islands: 19 (Belle Isle, see list)

Windermere (historically Winder Mere) (Note: When differentiation from the town is needed, the term "Lake Windermere" is most commonly used by those making a living on the lake, such as Windermere Lake Cruises: "See all of Lake Windermere on one easy ticket", also the BBC, The Times, and many others. The substantially rarer form is "Windermere Lake".) is a ribbon lake in Cumbria, England. It is within the Lake District and is the largest lake in England by length, area, and volume, although considerably smaller than the largest Scottish lochs and Northern Irish loughs.

Windermere is about 11 miles (18 km) in length and 1 mile (1.6 km) at its widest, has a maximum depth of 64 metres (210 ft), and has an elevation of 39 metres (128 ft) above sea level. Its outflow is the River Leven, which drains into Morecambe Bay. For administrative purposes the lake is in the unitary authority area of Westmorland and Furness, and it historically formed part of the boundary between Westmorland and Lancashire.

The lake has been popular with tourists since the Kendal and Windermere Railway's branch line opened in 1847. The Freshwater Biological Association was established on the shore of Windermere in 1929 and much of the early work on lake ecology, freshwater biology and limnology was conducted here.

== Toponymy ==
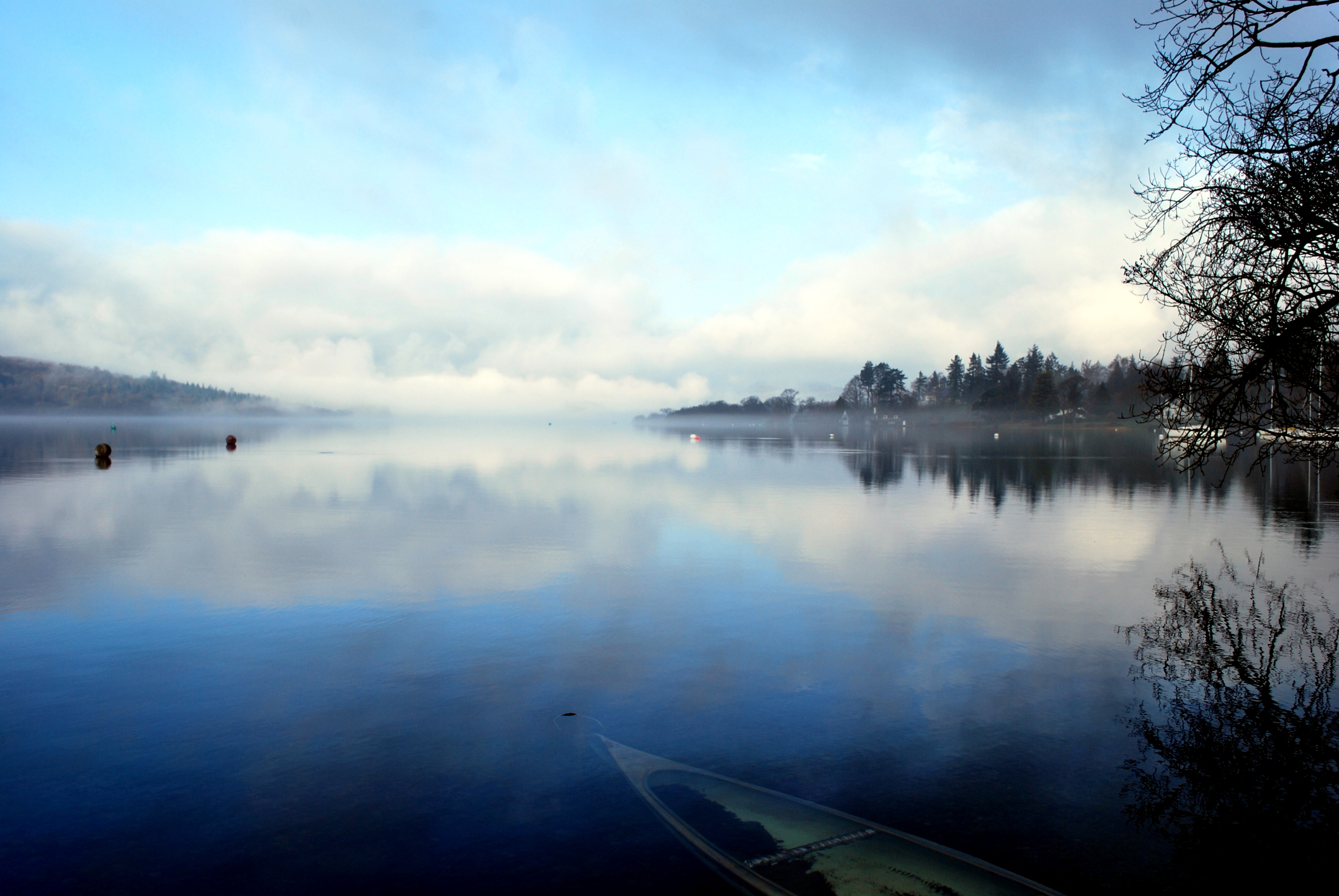
Windermere on a misty morning

The word "Windermere" is thought to translate as "'Winand or Vinand's lake'... The specific has usually been identified with an Old Swedish personal name 'Vinandr', genitive singular 'Vinandar'"... although "the personal noun is of very restricted distribution even in Sweden". Another possibility is that it refers to a "Continental Germanic personal noun, 'Wīnand'...Since this name could not have been current until the 12th century, the fact that the Old Norse genitive singular '-ar-' has been added to it, it would suggest that Old Norse was still a living language in the area at that time." Alternative spellings may be "Wynhendermere" and "Wynenderme". The second element is Old English "mere", meaning "lake" or "pool". It was known as "Winander Mere" or "Winandermere" until at least the 19th century.

Its name suggests it is a mere, a lake that is broad in relation to its depth, but despite the name this is not the case for Windermere, which in particular has a noticeable thermocline, distinguishing it from typical meres. Until the 19th century, the term "lake" was, indeed, not much used by or known to the native inhabitants of the area, who referred to it as Windermere/Winandermere Water, or (in their dialect) Windermer Watter. The name Windermere or Windermer was used of the parish that had clearly taken its name from the water. The poet Norman Nicholson comments on the use of the phrase "Lake Windermere": "a certain excuse for the tautology can be made in the case of Windermere, since we need to differentiate between the lake and the town, though it would be better to speak of 'Windermere Lake' and Windermere Town', but no one can excuse such ridiculous clumsiness as 'Lake Derwentwater' and 'Lake Ullswater'."

The extensive parish included most of Undermilbeck (that is, excepting Winster and the part of Crook chapelry that lay west of the Gilpin, which were part of Kirkby Kendal parish), Applethwaite, Troutbeck and Ambleside-below-Stock, that is, the part of Ambleside that lay south of Stock Beck. The parish church was at Bowness in Undermilbeck.

== Geography ==
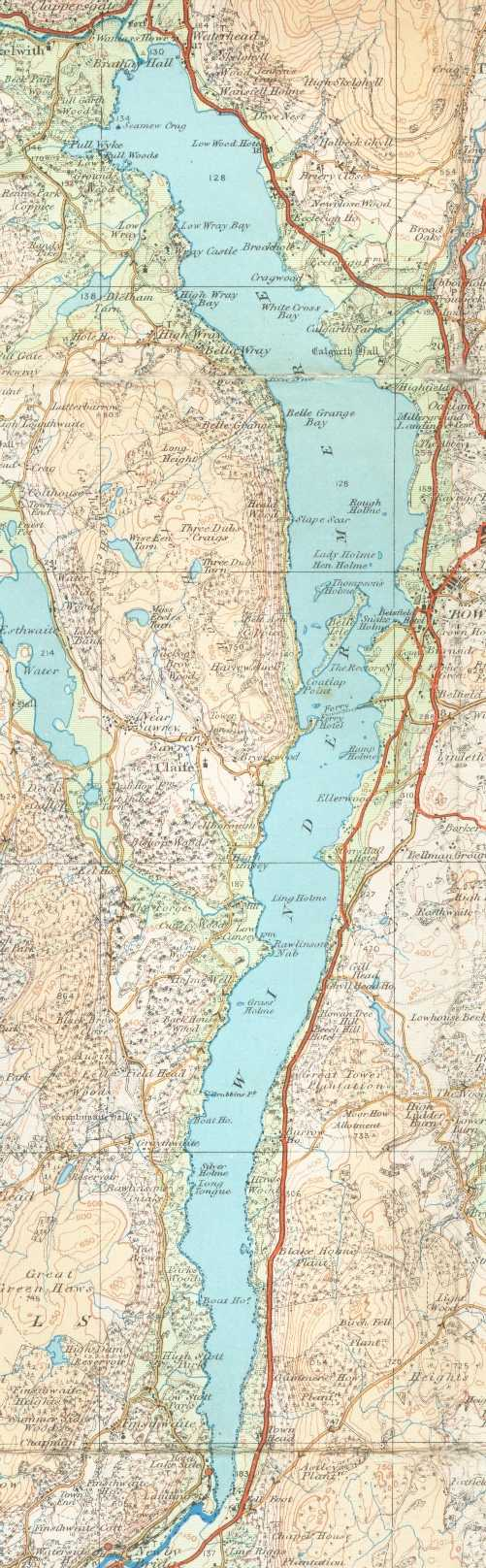
A 1925 map of the lake

Windermere is long and narrow, like many other ribbon lakes, and lies in a steep-sided pre-glacial river valley that has become deepened by successive glaciations. The current lake was formed after the Last Glacial Maximum during the retreat of the British and Irish Ice Sheet some time between 17,000 and 14,700 years ago, just before the start of the Windermere Interstadial. The lake water was sourced from the meltwater of retreating ice in the catchment, which receded up the Troutbeck valley and up the valleys that now contain the rivers Rothay and Brathay. There were at least nine ice retreat phases, indicated by buried recessional moraines. The lake has two separate basins – north and south – with different characteristics influenced by the geology. This consists of hard volcanic rocks in the north basin and softer shales in the south.

The lake is drained from its southernmost point by the River Leven. It is replenished by the rivers Brathay, Rothay, Trout Beck, Cunsey Beck and several other lesser streams. The lake is largely surrounded by foothills of the Lake District which provide pleasant low-level walks; to the north and northeast are the higher fells of central Lakeland.

There is debate as to whether the stretch of water between Newby Bridge and Lakeside at the southern end of the lake should be considered part of Windermere, or a navigable stretch of the River Leven. This affects the stated length of the lake, which is 11.23 miles (18.07 km) long if measured from the bridge at Newby Bridge, or 10.5 miles (16.9 km) if measured from Lakeside. The lake varies in width up to a maximum of 1 mile (1.6 km), and covers an area of 14.73 km^{2} (5.69 sq mi). With a maximum depth of 66.7 m (219 ft) and an elevation above sea level of 39 m (128 ft), the lowest point of the lake bed is well below sea level.

There is only one town or village directly on the lakeshore, Bowness-on-Windermere, as the village of Windermere does not directly touch the lake and the centre of Ambleside is one mile (1.6 km) to the north of Waterhead. The village of Windermere is about 20 minutes' walk from Millerground, the nearest point on the lakeshore. It did not exist before the arrival of the railway in 1847. The station was built in an area of open fell and farmland in the township of Applethwaite. The nearest farm was Birthwaite, which gave its name to the station and the village that began to grow up near it. In about 1859, the residents began to call their new village by the name of Windermere, much to the chagrin of the people of Bowness, which had been the centre of the parish of Windermere for many centuries. Since 1907 the two places have been under one council and, although there are still two separate centres, the area between is largely built up, albeit bordering on woodland and open fields. Windermere railway station is a hub for train and bus connections to the surrounding areas and is 1 1/4 miles (2 km) from the Waterbus jetty. There is a regular train service to Oxenholme on the West Coast Main Line, where there are fast trains to Edinburgh, Glasgow, Manchester Airport, Birmingham and London.

=== Islands ===
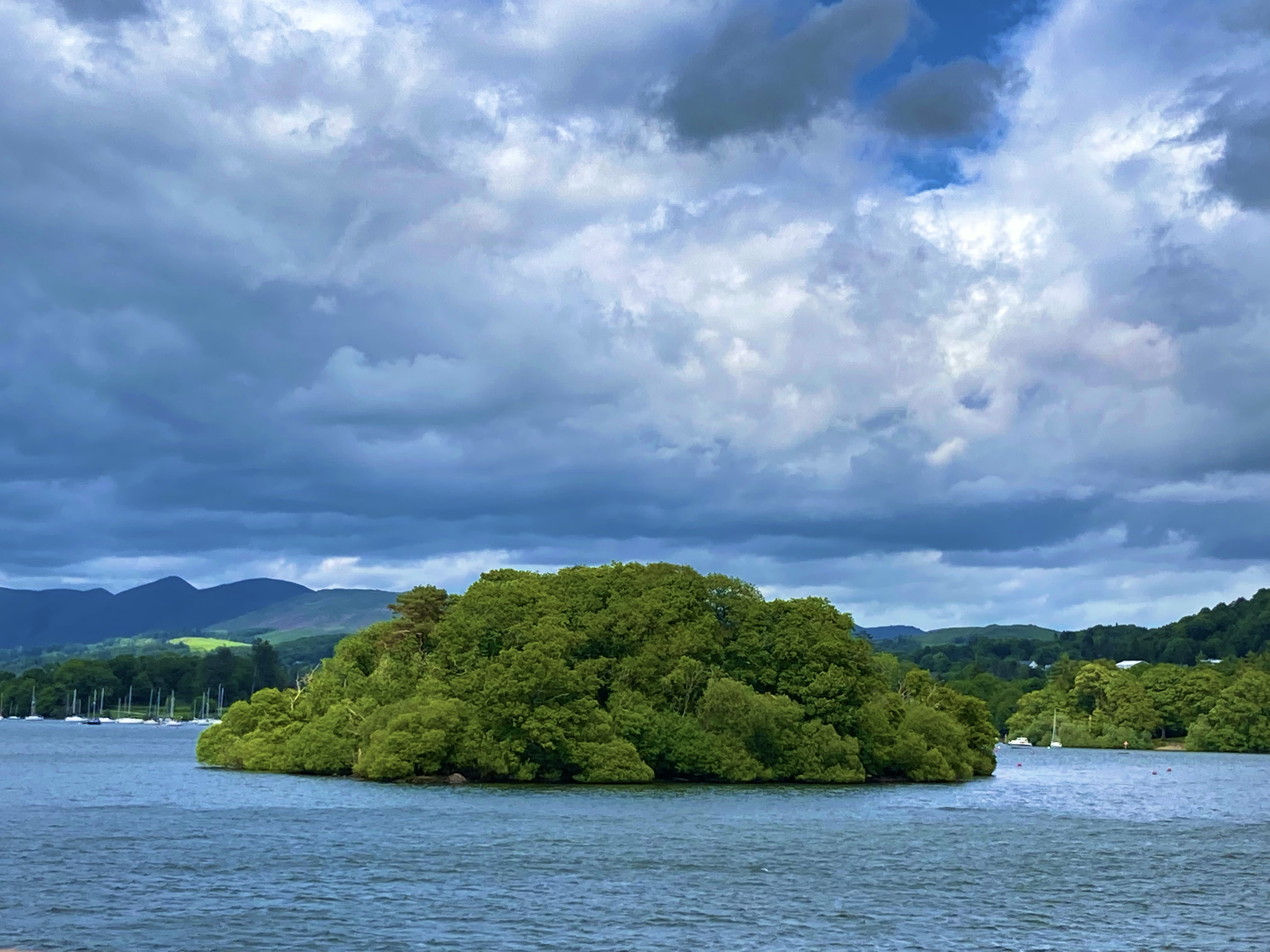
Ramp Holme is one of several islands on Windermere.

The lake contains 18 islands. By far the largest is the privately owned Belle Isle opposite Bowness. It is around a kilometre in length, and 16 hectares (40 acres). Its older name was Lang Holme, and 800 years ago it was the centre of the manor of Windermere and later, in effect, of a moiety of the barony of Kendal.

The other islands, or "holmes", are considerably smaller. The word "holme" or "holm" means small island or islet and comes from Old Norse holmr (as in Stockholm). The island of Lady Holme is named after the chantry that formerly stood there and in former centuries was sometimes called St Mary Holme or just Mary Holme. The remaining islands are Bee Holme (the insular status of which depends on the water level), Blake Holme, Crow Holme, Birk or Birch Holme (called Fir Holme on Ordnance Survey maps), Grass Holme, Lilies of the Valley (East, and West), Ling Holme (a rocky hump with a few trees and a growth of ling), Hawes Holme, Hen Holme (also rocky and sometimes known as chair and Table Island from some old flags or slabs of stone that were formerly found there), Maiden Holme (the smallest island, with just one tree), Ramp Holme (variously called Roger Holme and Berkshire Island at different times in its history), Rough Holme, Snake Holme, Thompson Holme (the second largest), Silver Holme.

== Local government ==
Before 1974, the lake lay wholly within the county of Westmorland; however, the historic county boundary between Lancashire and Westmorland runs down the western shore of the lake and also along about three miles (5 km) of the southern section of the eastern shore. Anyone crossing the lake from east to west on the Windermere Ferry thus travels from the historic county of Westmorland to that of Lancashire.

Local government reorganisation in 1974 placed Windermere and its shores within the district of South Lakeland in the non-metropolitan county of Cumbria. Since April 2023, Cumbria no longer exists for administrative purposes and the lake falls entirely within Westmorland and Furness administrative area. Most planning matters concerned with the lake are, however, the responsibility of the Lake District National Park Authority.

== Boating ==
=== Steamer and launches ===
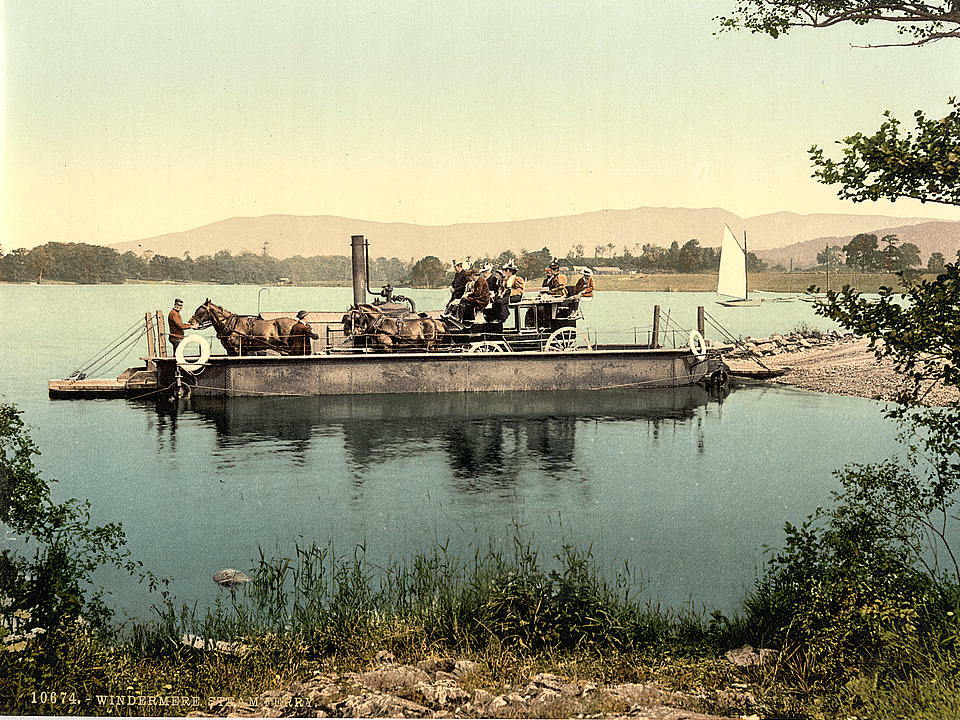
Steam ferry on Windermere, c. 1895

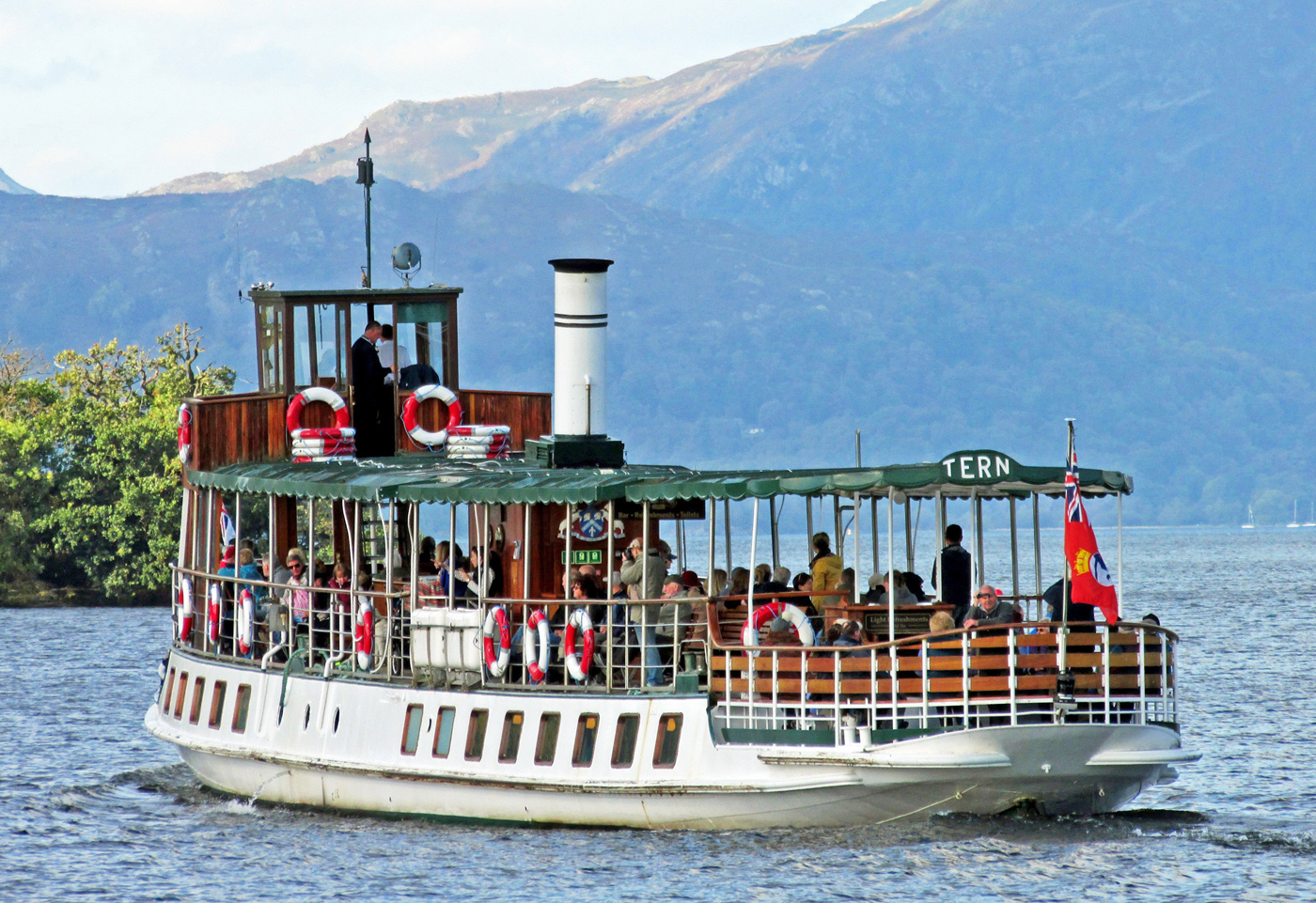
The MV Tern of 1891 leaving Bowness for Ambleside

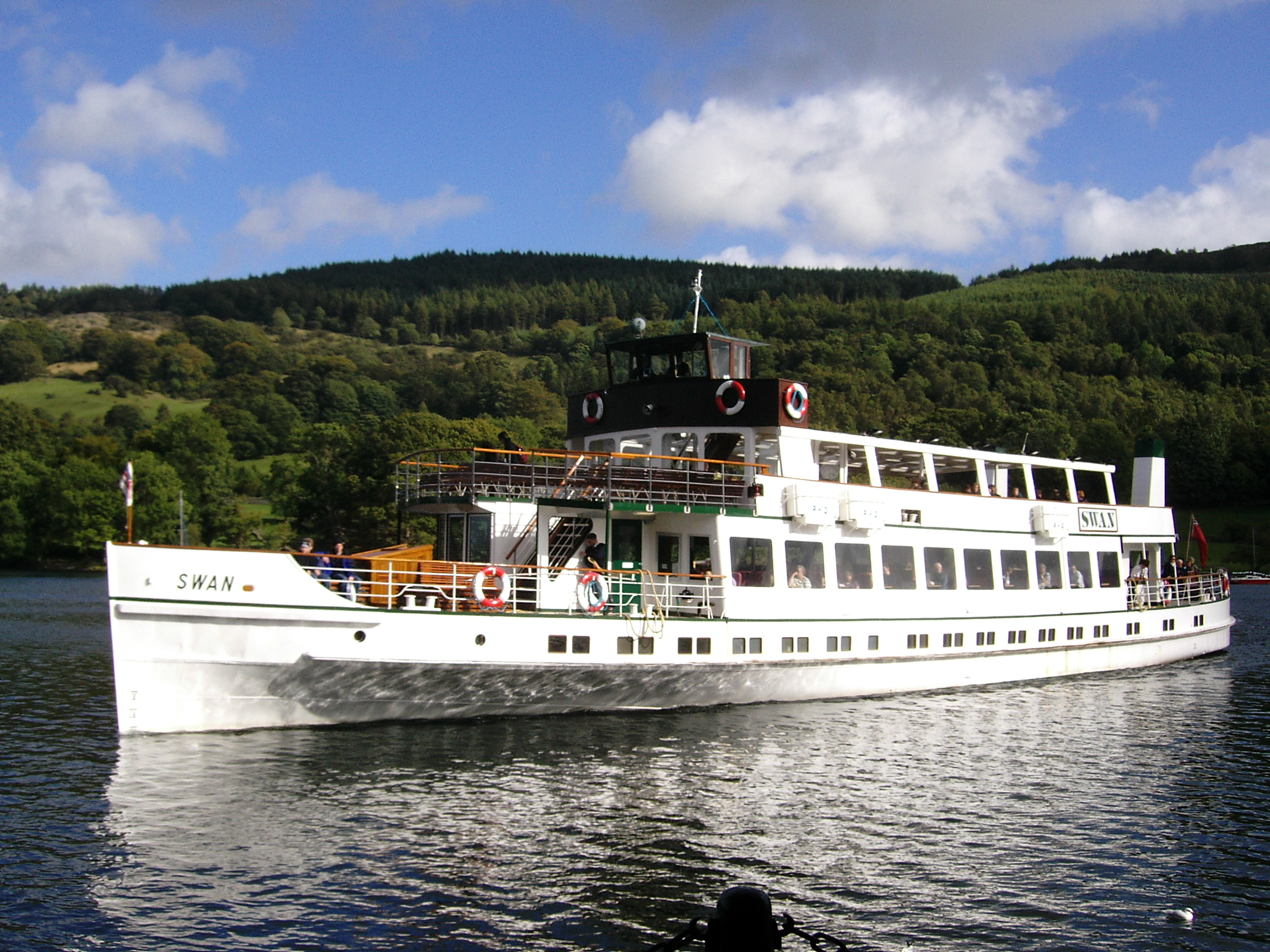
The MV Swan on Windermere

Passenger services operate along the whole length of the lake, from Lakeside railway station, on the Lakeside and Haverthwaite heritage steam railway at the southern end of the lake, to Waterhead Bay near Ambleside in the north. Intermediate stops are made at Bowness and, by smaller launches only, at Brockhole. Some boats only operate part of the route, or operate out and back cruises, whilst others run the whole distance.

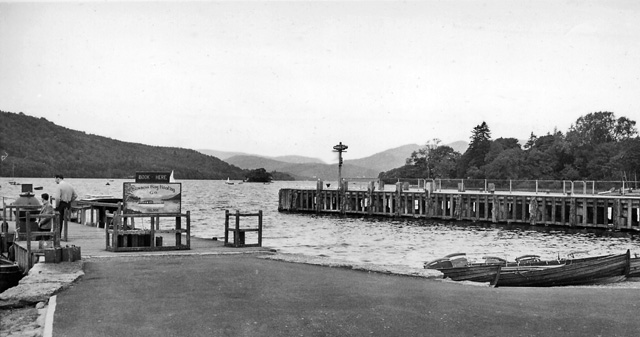
Bowness-on-Windermere landing station in 1961

These services date back to the former Furness Railway, who built the Lakeside branch, and were at one time operated by British Rail, the former state-owned rail operator. Since privatisation, three of the original large railway boats are operated by Windermere Lake Cruises Ltd, along with a fleet of smaller and more modern launches. Three of the original four boats survive: the MV Tern of 1891, the MV Teal of 1936, and the MV Swan of 1938. The fourth, MV Swift of 1900, which was converted from steam to diesel in 1956, was broken up at Lakeside in 1998. Her rudder and only one propeller are displayed at Bowness. Although often described as "steamers", all are now diesel motor vessels. Tern and Swift were built with steam engines, but converted to diesel power in the 1950s.

=== Ferries ===
The Windermere Ferry, a vehicle-carrying cable ferry, runs across the lake from Ferry Nab on the eastern side of the lake to Far Sawrey on the western side of the lake. This service forms part of the B5285. There are also two summer only passenger ferries that cross the lake. One crosses from Lakeside station to Fell Foot Park at the southern end of the lake, whilst the other links Bowness with Far Sawrey.

=== Boat clubs ===
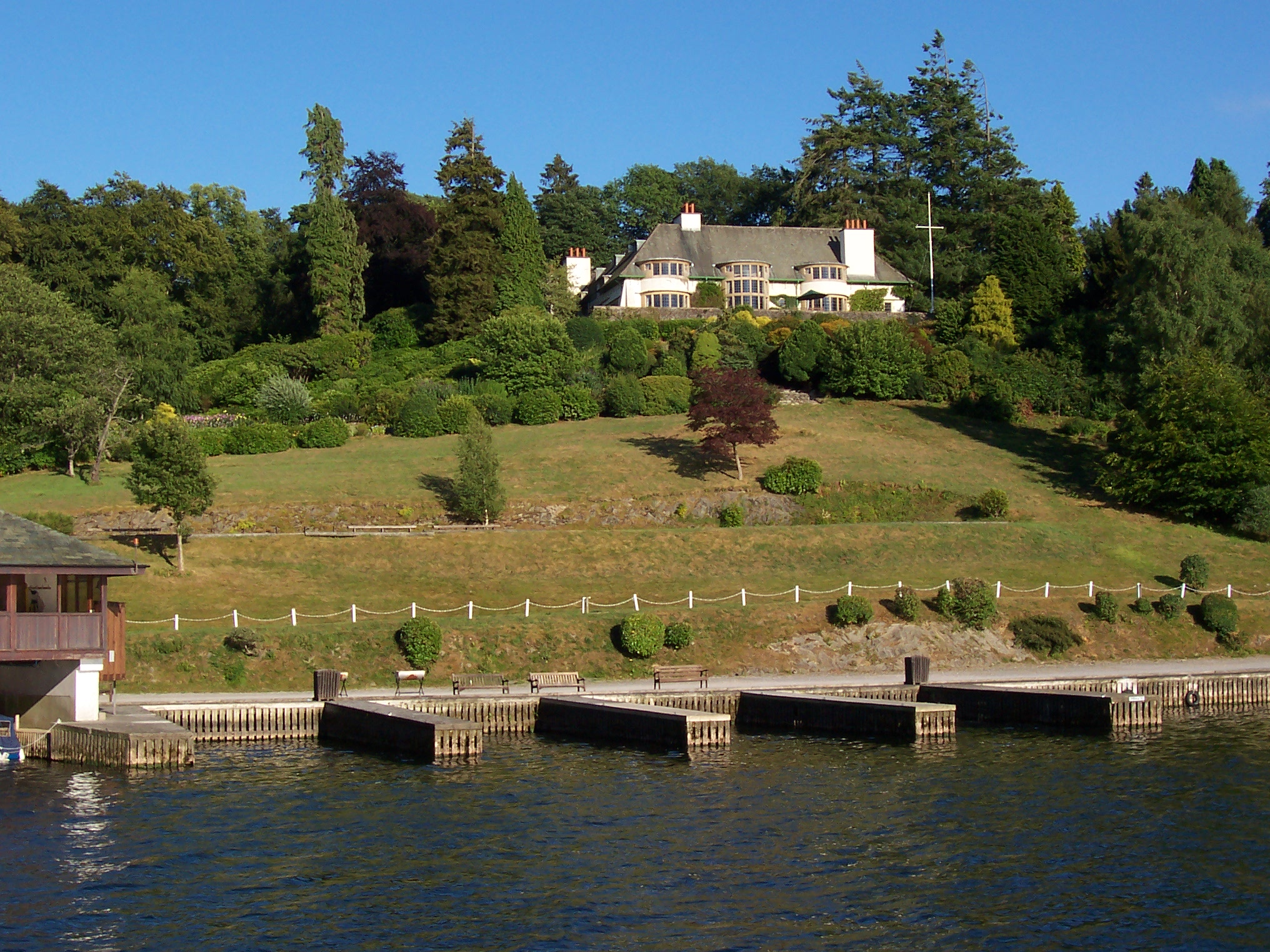
Broad Leys, part of the Windermere Motor Boat Racing Club

There are five large boating clubs based around the lake: the South Windermere Sailing Club, Windermere Motor Boat Racing Club, the Lake District Boat Club, the Royal Windermere Yacht Club, and the Windermere Cruising Association. The Royal Windermere Yacht Club maintains a set of turning marks on the lake, which are also used by the Windermere Cruising Association. The Lake District Boat Club is a family orientated club open to all (owning a boat is not essential), with premises located in Bowness the club house has views of the lake and surrounding fells. The LDBC also run a full programme of both social and racing events. The Windermere Cruising Association organises the popular Winter Series. This event benefits from not being hindered by the large waves, caused by gales, that often lead to sea racing being cancelled. The WCA also have a full calendar of summer races which are open to all abilities.

At the south end of the lake is South Windermere Sailing Club, based at Fell Foot park on the east shore. It was started in 1961 as a family sailing club and has been the starting point for many successful British dinghy racing competitors including British, European and world champions. The notoriously fluky wind on the lake has proved a successful training ground in learning to read the fast-changing wind. SWSC celebrated its 50th anniversary in 2011 and has developed a strong junior section under the coaching of Julie Tomkinson who in 2011 was honoured with an RYA Community Award for Outstanding Contribution.

In 2015, Lakeland Rowing club set up a base at Fell Foot Park. The club grew quickly and has now separated from the Northern section of the club (based at Derwent water) and has taken the name Windermere Rowing Club. The club is small in comparison to the more established clubs in the country but is continually growing with the number of both members and boats constantly increasing.

The Ferry House Regatta was the subject of a painting by Thomas Allom and in Fisher's Drawing Room Scrap Book, 1837 this was illustrated in the poem Regatta.—Windermere Lake. by Letitia Elizabeth Landon.

=== Speed records ===
On Friday 13 June 1930, Sir Henry Segrave broke the world water speed record on Windermere in his boat, Miss England II at an average speed of 158.94 km/h (98.76 mph). On the third run over the course, off Belle Grange, the boat capsized. Segrave's mechanic, Victor Helliwell drowned, but Segrave was rescued by support boats. He died a short time later of his injuries. Segrave was one of the few people in history who have held the world land speed record and water speed record simultaneously.

Norman Buckley, a member of the Windermere Motor Boat Racing Club, set several world water speed records on Windermere in the 1950s.

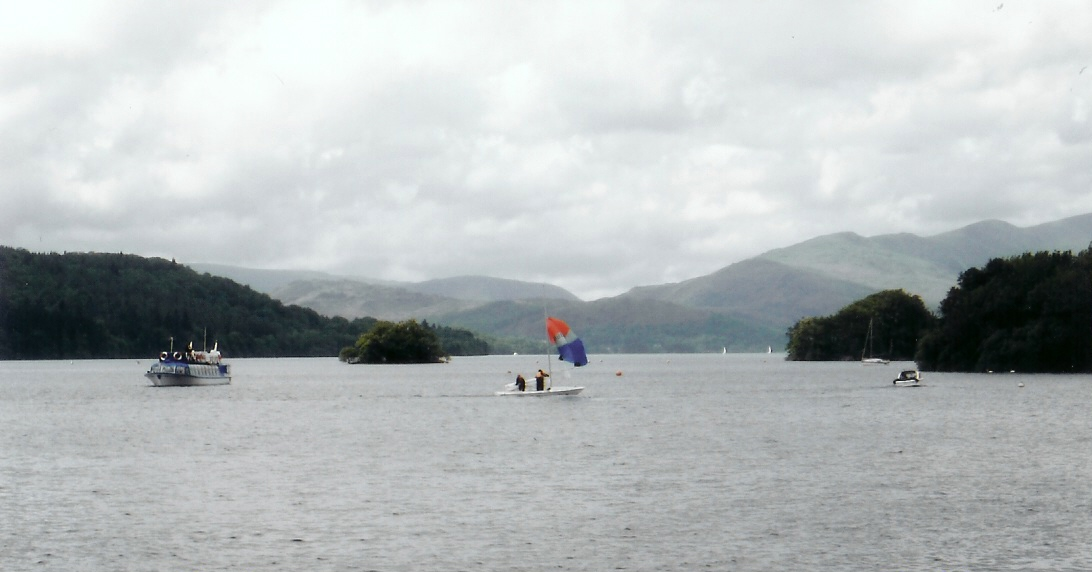
Windermere at Bowness

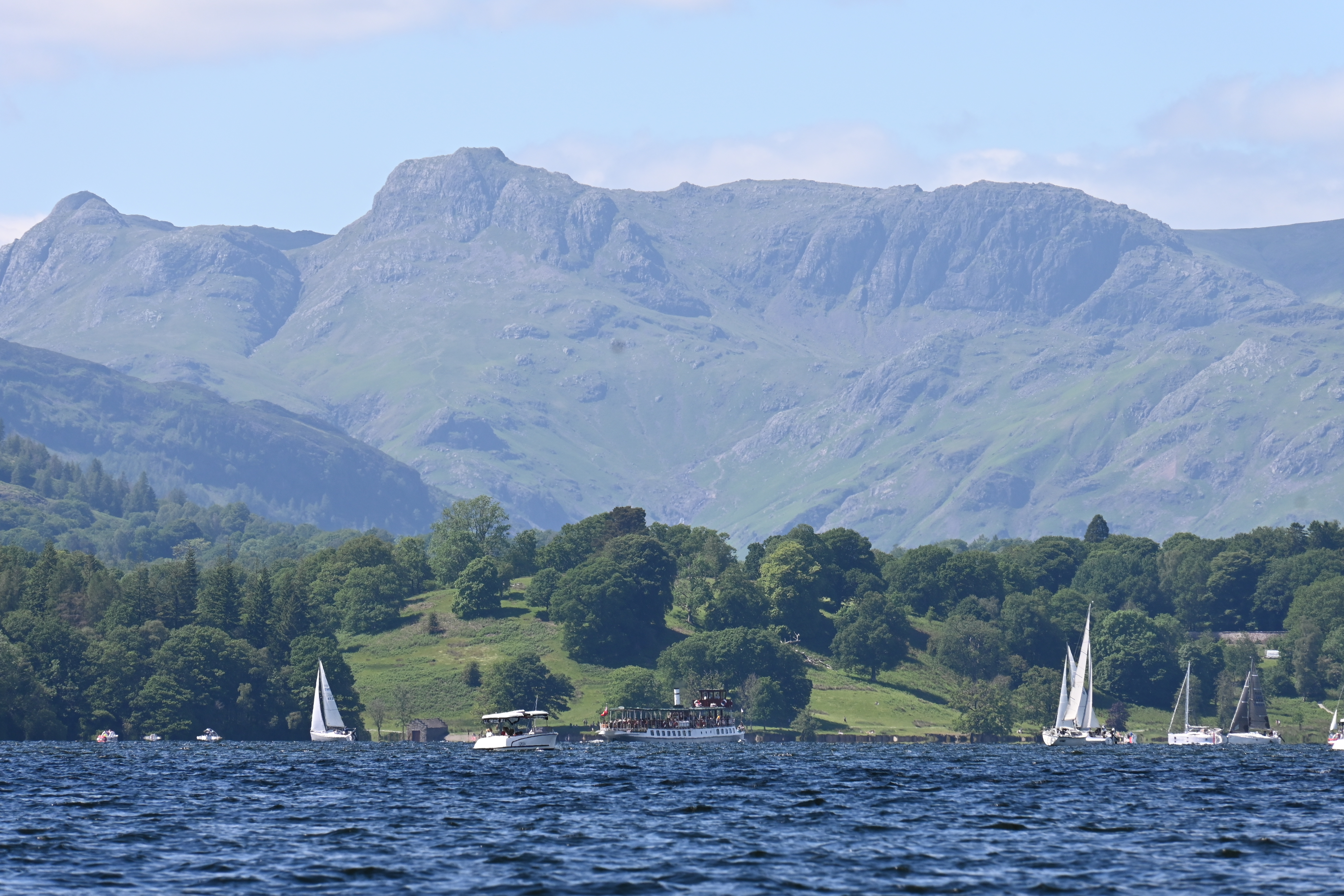
Looking over Windermere to the Langdale Pikes from Millerground

=== Speed limits ===
For many years, powerboating and water-skiing have been popular activities on the lake. In March 2000, the Lake District National Park Authority controversially introduced a bylaw setting a 10-knot (12 mph; 19 km/h) speed limit for all powered craft on the lake, in addition to three existing 6-knot (7 mph; 11 km/h) speed limits for all craft on the upper, lower, and middle sections of the lake. The bylaw came into force in 2000, but there was a five-year transition period and the new speed limits were only enforced from 29 March 2005. The bylaws on the lake were reviewed and renewed in 2008. Despite the speed limits people continue to use powerboats on the lake, both legally and illegally.

=== Windermere Steamboat Museum ===
Windermere Steamboat Museum is located on Rayrigg Road in Bowness, and included a collection of vintage steam boats dating back to 1850, five sailing boats (the oldest built in 1780), two dugout canoes, as well as information about Swallows and Amazons and the history of racing boats. The museum was closed in 2006 for refurbishment and re-opened, considerably enlarged, in March 2019 as the Windermere Jetty: Museum of Boats, Steam and Stories.

The long popularity of steam launches on Windermere has even given its name to the Windermere kettle, a steam-powered tea urn.

=== Windermere water bus ===
In 2005, the Windermere Management Strategy identified the potential for water bus services on the lake. In 2009, the Lake District National Park Authority commissioned a detailed study into the demand for such services. In July 2009, it was announced that Windermere Lake Cruises would be operating additional stops around the lake. In January 2012, the Park Authority launched a consultation on further expansion of the water bus service.

== Swimming ==
=== Great North Swim ===
On Saturday 13 September 2008, Windermere hosted the inaugural Great North Swim, a one-mile (1.6 km) open water swim involving 2,200 swimmers. The second annual swim took place on 12 and 13 September 2009, with 6,000 swimmers, making this the largest open water swim in the UK.

=== Three Lakes Challenge ===
The 40-mile (64 km) Three Lakes Challenge (or Loch, Lake, Llyn) is a challenge first completed by a 5-person relay with Sam Plum, Jason Betley, Helen Gibbs, Helen Liddle, and Debbie Taylor on 3–4 July 2015 under English Channel rules. The course involves swimming the length of Loch Awe in Scotland (25 miles; 40 km), then driving to the Lake District and swimming the length of Windermere (10 1/2 miles; 17 km), and finally driving to Wales and swimming the length of Llyn Tegid (4 miles; 6 km). This challenge is intended as the swimming equivalent of the National Three Peaks Challenge.

== Popular culture ==
William Wordsworth, one of the Lake Poets, described the view of Windermere from the crest of a hill in The Prelude, Book IV:

Standing alone, as from a rampart's edge,
I overlooked the bed of Windermere,
Like a vast river, stretching in the sun.
With exultation, at my feet I saw
Lake, islands, promontories, gleaming bays,
A universe of Nature’s fairest forms
Proudly revealed with instantaneous burst,
Magnificent, and beautiful, and gay.

Dove's Nest, at the foot of Wansfell, was the home for a while in 1830 of the poet Felicia Hemans and her family. This is recorded in the text to Lydia Sigourney's poem Lake Winandermere

Oscar Wilde began working on his first hit play, Lady Windermere's Fan (1892), during a summer visit to the Lake District in 1891. A series of children's books by Arthur Ransome, Swallows and Amazons and its sequels Swallowdale, Winter Holiday, Pigeon Post and The Picts and the Martyrs, involve school holiday adventures in the 1930s around a fictional lake derived from a combination of Windermere and Coniston Water. The fictional lake resembles Windermere, but the surrounding hills and fells resemble those of Coniston Water. The BBC made a television series Swallows and Amazons in 1962; parts of this were filmed at the boathouse of Huyton Hill Preparatory School (now Pullwood House) on the northwestern shore.

Hollywood film comedian Stan Laurel was a frequent visitor to the lake at Windermere as a child. Born in Ulverston in 1890, his grandmother, uncle and aunt would take him and his cousins on excursions by train into the Lake District, visiting Flookburgh, Sawrey and Windermere.

The lake gave its name to a group of 300 Jewish boys, the "Windermere Boys", who survived Auschwitz and settled at Troutbeck Bridge near Windermere in 1945, thanks to the help of Leonard G. Montefiore. This refugee rescue was dramatised as The Windermere Children broadcast on the BBC in 2020 for the 75th anniversary of the liberation of Auschwitz.

Legends of female centaurs in Windermere served as the basis for Archie Fisher's 1976 song The Witch of the West-Mer-Lands, which was later covered by Stan Rogers. Fisher cites "tales of antlered women with bodies of deer seen wading in the shallows of the lakes in the moonlight" as the inspiration for his song. "Apparently deer used to swim across the shallow end of Lake Windermere and weeds got caught in their antlers and observers, probably wandering home from a local hostelry, took them to be these mythical creatures."

Windermere is a location used in the 1994 fighting game Tekken. Belle Isle features in the fifth book of Joseph Delaney's Spook's series, The Spooks Mistake; published in 2008. Rather than the large house, though, Belle Isle plays host to a folly which is used by the Water Witches in the area. In November 2009, several scenes were shot on Windermere for the ITV soap opera Coronation Street, featuring the newlyweds Gail and Joe on their honeymoon. Windermere and the surrounding countryside is the setting for mystery novelist Elizabeth George's 2012 book Believing the Lie, the 17th in the Inspector Lynley series.

Some people believe that there may be a lake monster, similar to the one alleged to live in Loch Ness, and in 2011 anomalous photos were taken of the supposed creature; it has been affectionately nicknamed "Bownessie".

In 2017, some scenes from the 2018 live-action film Peter Rabbit were filmed in Windermere and Ambleside, with the Peter Rabbit heritage being strongly linked to the area.

Taylor Swift mentions "Windermere peaks" and Wordsworth in her song, "The Lakes," included as a bonus track on her 2020 album, Folklore. She writes:

Take me to the lakes where all the poets went to die
I don't belong, and my beloved, neither do you
Those Windermere peaks look like a perfect place to cry
I'm setting off, but not without my muse

== Water quality ==
Recent monitoring of Windermere shows that water quality is mixed rather than uniformly poor: the most detailed sampling so far found localised hotspots of elevated phosphorus and bacterial contamination, especially near some inflows and shorelines, but also confirmed that conditions vary widely across the lake and that most areas are within good or acceptable ranges outside peak summer periods.

Long-term evidence suggests phosphorus levels are sometimes above ideal ecological targets, though substantially lower than their 1990s peak, indicating that water quality has improved in some locations without the lake as a whole being in continuous severe decline. Since 2021, the Save Windermere campaign has made several claims of alleged overflows entering the lake.

== Bibliography ==
- Parker, John Wilson (2004). An Atlas of the English Lakes. Cicerone Press. ISBN 978-1-85284-355-7.
