= Windermere Way =

Long-distance footpath in England

Coordinates: 54.355°N 2.939°W

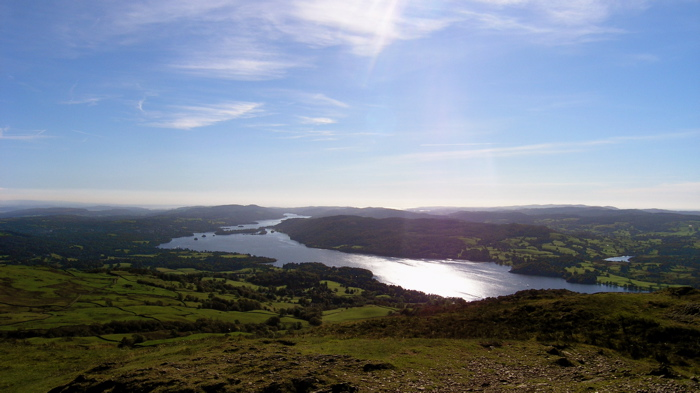
- Windermere from Wansfell Summit
- Length: 72 km (45 mi)
- Location: Northern England, United Kingdom
- Designation: Long distance footpath which is not a National Trail
- Trailheads: Bowness-on-Windermere, Cumbria
- Use: Hiking
- Highest point: Wansfell, 1,601 ft (488 m)

The Windermere Way is a 45-mile circuit of Windermere, a lake in the English Lake District. The route is wholly within the Lake District National Park and takes in the summits of Wansfell, Loughrigg Fell and Gummer's How as well as passing through the towns of Ambleside and Windermere.

== History and status ==
The Windermere Way is an unofficial route and mostly follows footpaths and bridleways. There are short stretches of road walking. The route can be broken down into four easy stages with an easy return to your starting point using the Windermere Ferry or the Lake Steamers.

== Route ==
The walk circumambulates Windermere and includes just about all the accessible lake shore paths together with ascents of the high points around the lake.

The route is broken down into four sections that most people will manage in a day’s easy walking. The Windermere to Ambleside walk starts at Bowness Bay and follows the lake shore northwards before ascending Orrest Head, dropping down again to cross Trout Beck then taking to the high fell tops, visiting Wansfell Pike the highest point on the walk.

Between Ambleside and Ferry House, the walk starts by climbing Loughrigg Fell, then drops down again past Loughrigg Tarn and on to a pleasant lakeside stroll by Wray Castle. It then climbs steeply again, to give views from Claife Heights, finishing at Ferry Nab.

Between Ferry Nab and Lakeside the route passes through Cunsey and winds along the western shore of Windermere, visiting High Dam at Finsthwaite before concluding at Lakeside Steamer Pier.

The final stretch from Lakeside back to Bowness is the longest and doesn't touch the lakeshore, providing views from Gummer's How and walking trails through the woods.

== Connecting trails ==
The route connects with the Dales Way at Bowness and Cumbria Way at Skelwith Bridge.

== Places of interest ==
The following hills are crossed by the route:

- Wansfell
- Loughrigg
- Claife Heights
- Gummers Howe

The following lakes and tarns are passed by the route:

- Windermere
- Grasmere
- Loughrigg Tarn
- High Dam
