= Save Windermere =

Environmental campaign group in Cumbria, England

- Formation: 2021 (incorporated 27 February 2023)
- Founders: Various
- Type: Community Interest Company (CIC)
- Headquarters: Cumbria, England
- Region served: United Kingdom
- Fields: Water quality, freshwater conservation
- Website: www.savewindermere.com

Save Windermere was a registered Community Interest Company (no. 14689574) operating as an independent environmental campaign group in Cumbria, England, advocating the elimination of all treated and untreated sewage discharges into the Windermere catchment. Incorporated as a company in 2023, the group has been recognised by national media and environmental organisations as a leading citizen-led freshwater campaign in the United Kingdom, receiving several awards for its activities. Its activities include protest actions, research and monitoring, and legal/policy advocacy.

== History ==
Save Windermere was established in 2021 after the Environment Agency reported that the sewage-treatment plant at Ambleside had legally discharged untreated sewage into Windermere for more than 1,700 hours during 2020.

In early 2023, Save Windermere became a registered not-for-profit Community Interest Company (CIC).

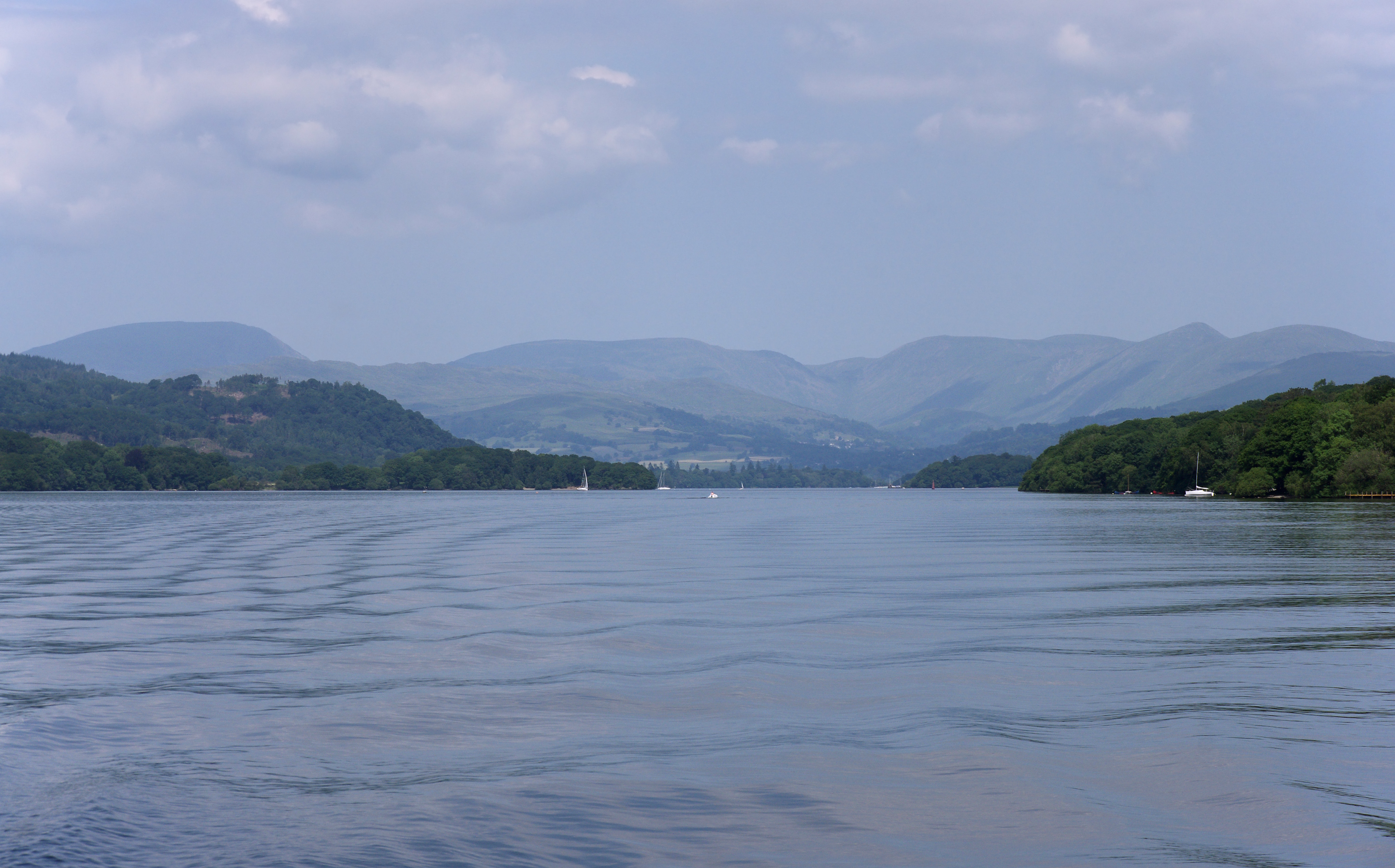
Lake Windermere

== Campaign objectives ==
Save Windermere states that its objective is to restore Windermere to a “natural” condition by ending all treated and untreated sewage discharges into the lake’s catchment.

The group frequently cites the example of Lake Annecy in France, which in the 1960s experienced increased algal blooms and declines in fish populations as a result of sewage inputs. A community-led campaign, backed by the mayor and local politicians, subsequently redirected sewage to treatment plants outside the catchment, and the lake is now promoted as one of the cleanest in Europe.

Save Windermere argues that, like Lake Annecy, Windermere has significant cultural (see Windermere — Popular Culture section) and environmental importance and should be treated as a special case within national water policy. In February 2024, Windermere and Bowness Town Council voted unanimously to support “any project or initiative” aimed at stopping all sewage discharges into England’s largest lake.

A feasibility study is now under way to examine the potential for an Annecy-style approach to end both mains and non-mains sewage discharges into the lake (see Government and regulatory impact).

== Campaigning activities ==
Save Windermere is engaged in activities relating to sewage pollution in Windermere, combining media advocacy, scientific monitoring and legal mechanisms.

=== Protests and public engagement ===
Save Windermere has run a variety of public-facing campaigns to raise awareness and mobilise support. These include regular protest actions and large-scale online petitions.

==== “Strike Against Sewage” protests ====
In late 2023, Save Windermere began a series of protest actions branded a “sewage strike,” drawing comparisons in the press to early climate-strike tactics. Coverage in The Times described the action as “Like Greta but wetter.” Subsequent features profiled the protest-led campaign and its focus on treated and untreated sewage discharges into the Windermere catchment.

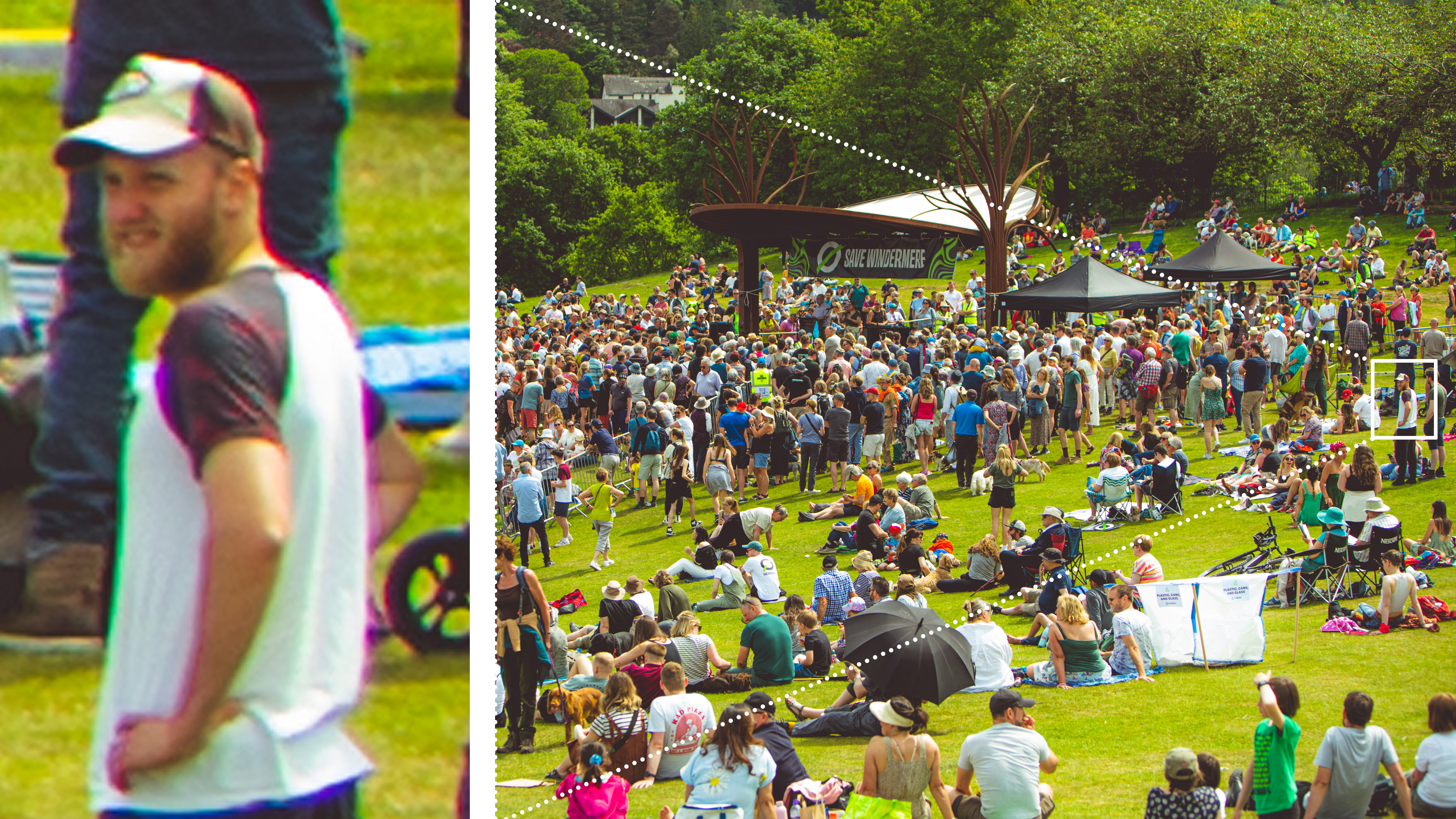
Protesters gather at a demonstration held by Save Windermere in May 2023. Insert shows campaigner wearing clothes and hat displaying the Save Windermere campaign logo, characteristic of protests at that time.

==== Petitions ====
Save Windermere has launched several petitions concerning sewage discharges and regulatory oversight. An article in Cumbria Crack reported that over 36,000 people signed a petition calling for a public inquiry into the Environment Agency following a fish kill. Another petition to "Save Windermere lake from sewage and an environmental catastrophe" reportedly passed 100,000 signatories according to The Westmorland Gazette in 2022.

=== Research and monitoring ===
The campaign also undertakes or commissions scientific research to document environmental impacts in the Windermere catchment.

==== Invertebrate (macroinvertebrate) monitoring ====
Since May 2023, Save Windermere has worked with the charity WildFish through its SmartRivers programme to assess ecological conditions in tributaries flowing to Windermere. Field sampling above and below wastewater assets reported reductions in sensitive riverfly taxa downstream at several sites, including a 76% reduction below the Near Sawrey wastewater treatment works on Cunsey Beck. A 2025 SmartRivers update stated that in 2023 “the health of every river sampled in the Windermere catchment was impacted by United Utilities’ assets,” with lower riverfly abundance below treatment works compared with upstream locations.

==== Satellite observation project ====
In 2023, Save Windermere partnered with geospatial analytics firm Map Impact on a satellite-based study of algal dynamics and nutrient pressures in the Windermere catchment, with backing from the UK Space Agency. The project analysed chlorophyll-a and related indicators across the lake using multi-sensor imagery to identify bloom onset and spatial “hotspots” linked to nutrient inputs. The study identified a correlation between peak tourist periods, based on movement data from cellular networks, and algal blooming, which researchers suggested was linked to increased nutrient inputs via sewage loading.

=== Legal and policy actions ===
Save Windermere has also pursued legal and policy avenues to address sewage pollution, focusing on regulatory rights and enforcement mechanisms.

==== Non-mains drainage ====
Save Windermere has advocated for property owners with private wastewater systems—such as septic tanks or package treatment plants—to use Section 101A of the Water Industry Act 1991 to request connection to the public sewer network where their systems are causing or are likely to cause environmental or amenity harm. United Utilities said that such information about rights under Section 101A was “readily available” on its website, and that it was working with private system owners to explore “bolt-on” upgrades to existing systems.

==== Statutory nuisance complaint ====
In June 2024, Save Windermere filed a statutory nuisance complaint with Westmorland and Furness Council regarding sewage pollution – reported as one of the first uses of such a legal mechanism against a water company.

=== Data and policy engagement ===
Save Windermere has used freedom-of-information requests, legal complaints and media partnerships to highlight alleged sewage discharges. In January 2025, United Utilities dropped its appeals against disclosure of treated-sewage discharge data following Save Windermere’s requests under the Environmental Information Regulations (EIR).

As reported in The Guardian in November 2024, analysis published by Peter Hammond, a retired Professor of Computational Biology at University College London, using data obtained by Save Windermere from United Utilities and the Environment Agency under EIR, alleged that seven United Utilities sewage plants and pumping stations in the Lake District had illegally spilled on 501 days between 2018 and 2023.

A separate BBC investigation in October 2024 estimated that one of those pumping stations discharged 140 million litres of waste into Windermere over three years.

In March 2025, analysis by Save Windermere and Windrush Against Sewage Pollution suggested untreated sewage had been illegally discharged into Windermere on 140 days in 2024. United Utilities disputed the findings, describing some of the data as “inaccurate” and “erroneous” but declined to give written examples of specific errors when asked by the BBC.

== Government and regulatory impact ==
On 9 March 2025, the UK Government announced its ambition to end all sewage discharges into Windermere, with then Environment Secretary Steve Reed pledging to work with local partners to eliminate sewage discharges into the lake including treatment facilities and storm overflows.

A thorough feasibility study was subsequently launched – established by the “Only Rainwater” local coalition including United Utilities, the Environment Agency, Ofwat, Save Windermere, Love Windermere, the Lake District National Park Authority, and Westmorland and Furness Council. The study, due to be completed in the summer of 2026, will determine what would be needed to eliminate sewage discharges into the lake, drawing on successful examples and innovation from around the world to create a roadmap for delivery.

Save Windermere’s information-rights cases also coincided with the Information Commissioner's Office issuing a practice recommendation to United Utilities for mishandling environmental information requests, and with Ofwat opening further enforcement cases into wastewater treatment operations.

== Further impact ==
Save Windermere’s campaigning has coincided with a number of policy and operational changes affecting the Windermere catchment. In September 2024, United Utilities announced an investment programme of approximately £190 million over the next five years to upgrade wastewater treatment works and storm overflows in the area to reduce sewage discharges into the lake.

In May 2024, the Environment Agency confirmed that it was reviewing every United Utilities discharge permit in the Windermere catchment as part of its wider investigation into the company’s operations. According to the agency, its evidence-gathering work in the area is also supporting a criminal investigation into alleged illegal discharges by United Utilities.

In October 2024, the Environment Agency stated that it was “transforming our approach to water industry regulation” nationally, including recruiting 500 additional specialised officers and quadrupling the number of water company inspections to 4,000 by the end of March 2025, rising to 10,000 inspections in the following year. The agency said these changes were aimed at improving on-the-ground regulation and maintenance of wastewater sites. In March 2025, then Environment Secretary Steve Reed on a visit to Windermere stated his "support for local action and regulation to protect and improve water quality, including 33 additional Environment Agency specialist officers in the region and a quadrupling of water company inspections."

Ofwat also opened enforcement cases into wastewater treatment operations and the Environment Agency said investigations into potential offences were ongoing in Cumbria and elsewhere.

== Reception and media coverage ==
The campaign has been covered widely by UK media, including the BBC, ITV News and national newspapers.

=== Notable supporters ===
High-profile supporters such as Steve Coogan, Paul Whitehouse and Lee Mack joined a Windermere pollution protest publicised by the group in May 2023, with Coogan telling ITV’s Good Morning Britain: “It is a national scandal.”

In April 2024, singer Feargal Sharkey joined Save Windermere's weekly protest outside United Utilities' Information Center calling for a clean up of the lake and describing the campaigners as "decent, honest people.”

=== Chefs 4 Save Windermere ===
Save Windermere’s Chefs 4 Save Windermere initiative also gained significant media attention as a food festival event that united Lake District Michelin-starred and critically acclaimed chefs to support the campaign through fundraising and publicity. In September 2023, over six nights, chefs including Simon Rogan (of L’Enclume and Rogan & Co), Ollie Bridgwater (SOURCE at Gilpin Hotel), Ryan Blackburn (The Old Stamp House), Richard Swale, Anthony Amos, Ben Queen-Fryer, and others hosted tasting-menu dinners overlooking Windermere, using locally sourced, sustainable produce. The event was framed not only as a fundraiser but as a cultural moment, showcasing the region’s culinary talent while drawing broader public awareness to the environmental issues facing Windermere.

== See also ==
- Windermere
- Sewage discharge in the United Kingdom
- Environment Agency
- United Utilities
- Ofwat
