= Cunsey Beck =

River in Cumbria, England

Coordinates: 54.3343°N 2.9480°W

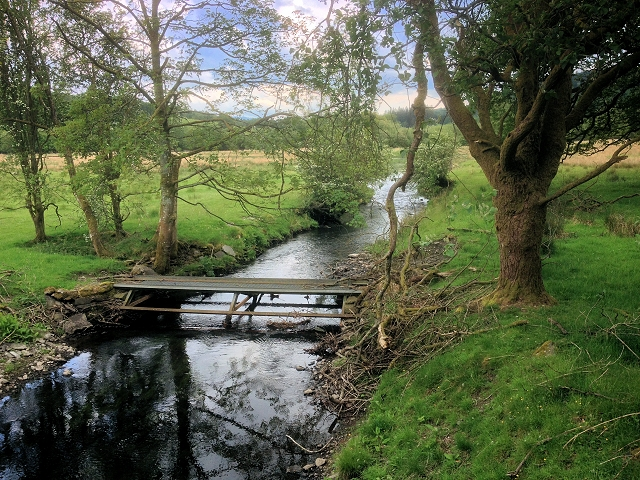
Cunsey Beck between Esthwaite Water and Windermere

Cunsey Beck is one of several rivers and streams that replenish the lake of Windermere in the English Lake District. Being just over two miles (3.2 km) in length and generally slow flowing, the stream descends some 87 feet (27 m) from the southern end of Esthwaite Water, which it drains, to the western banks of Windermere near an island called Ling Holm.

After flowing out of Esthwaite Water, the Cunsey Beck replenishes the small Out Dubs Tarn. Draining the tarn at its southern end, the beck then flows in a south-easterly direction between the conifer-wooded slopes of Grizedale Forest to the south and west, and the deciduous woodland of Bishop Woods to the north. Just before entering Windermere, the beck passes through the deciduous Cunsey Wood. Immediately before entering the lake, Cunsey Beck is crossed by a footbridge, which is part of a public footpath along a stretch of the western shore of Windermere.

In 2022 the beck was the scene of a major pollution incident and many fish were killed. Local campaigners believe the cause was inadequately investigated at the time.

== See also ==
- River Brathay
- River Rothay
- Trout Beck
- River Leven
