= Lake District Boat Club =

The Lake District Boat Club is a sailing club, situated at Glebe Road, Bowness-on-Windermere, Cumbria, England. The club is family orientated and is open to all (owning a boat is not essential). The LDBC also run a full programme of both social and racing events.
