= Stock Ghyll =

Stream in Cumbria, England

Coordinates: 54°25′54″N 2°58′15″W

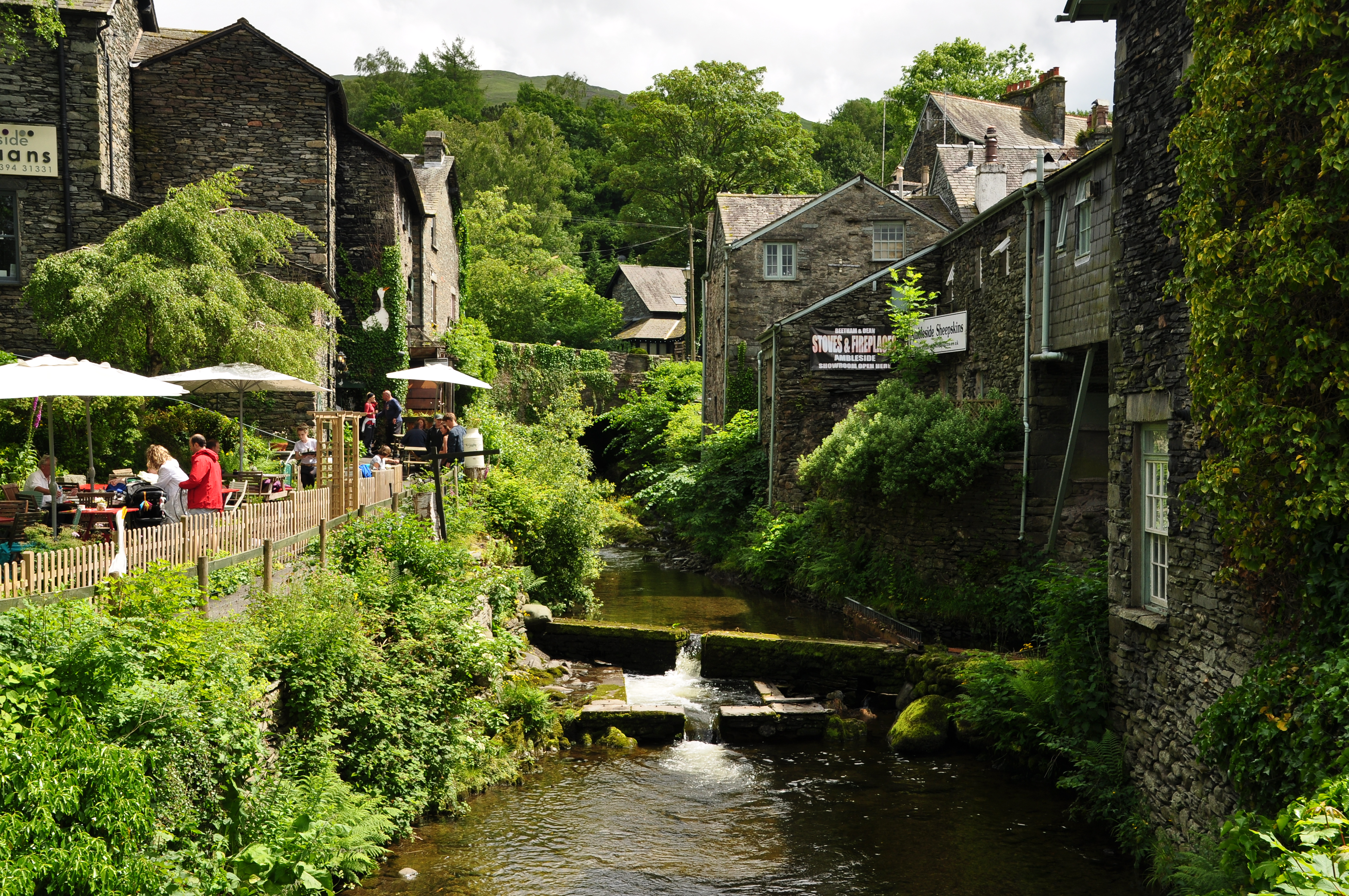
Stock Ghyll flowing through Ambleside

Stock Ghyll, also known as Stock Gill, Stock Gill Beck and Stock Beck, is a stream in the district of Westmorland and Furness, in the ceremonial county of Cumbria and the historic county of Westmorland. It flows about four miles from Red Screes through the town of Ambleside to the River Rothay. Its course includes two long-popular tourist attractions, Stockghyll Force and Bridge House. Stock Ghyll has been painted by J. M. W. Turner, John Ruskin, Kurt Schwitters, and many others. Its name derives from Old English stocc, 'tree-trunk', and Old Norse gil, 'a deep glen'.

== Course ==
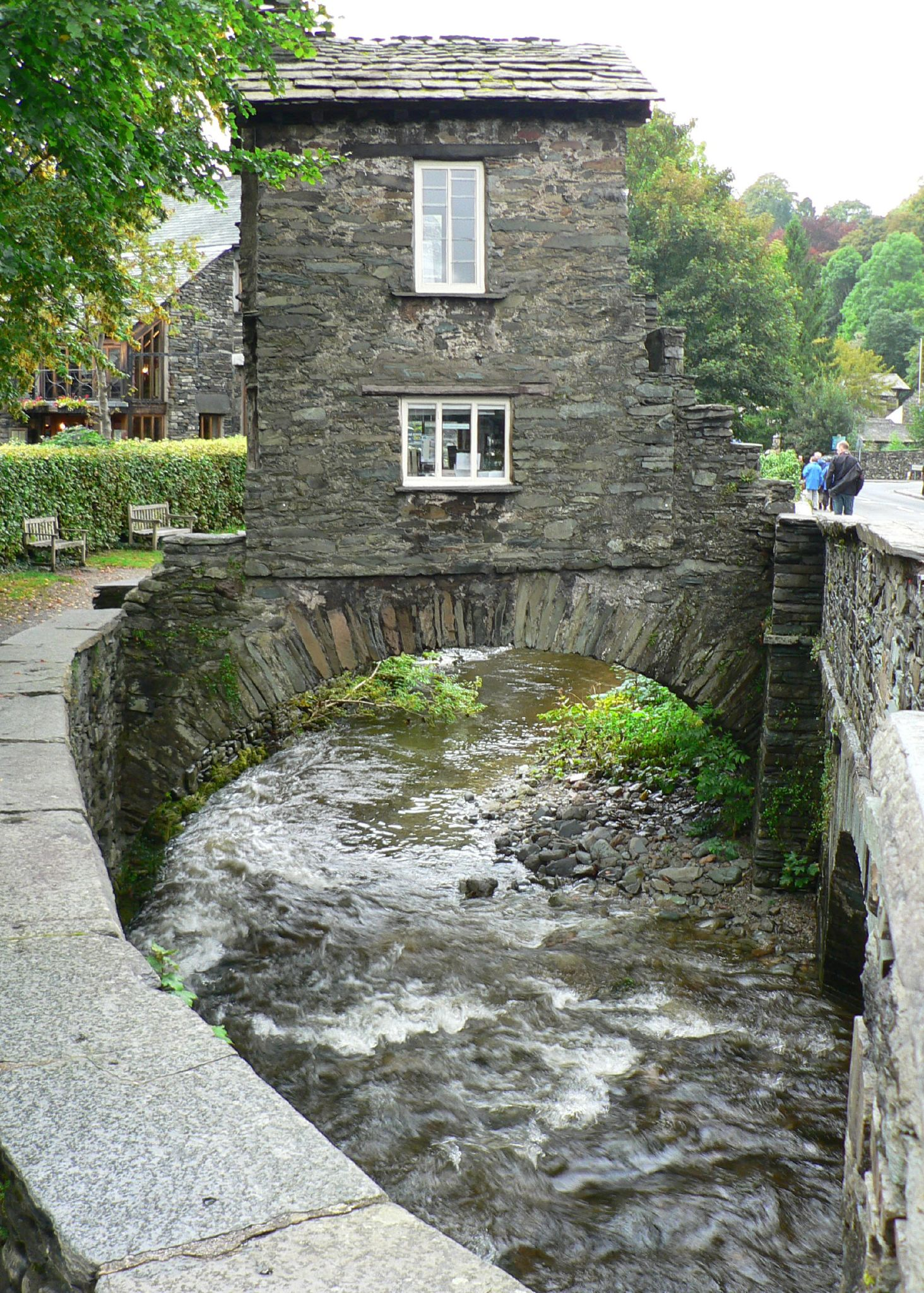
Bridge House

Stock Ghyll rises on the southern slopes of Red Screes, near Kirkstone Pass, and then runs in a generally southern direction, subsuming Snow Cove Gill and Grove Gill. Its course turns first south-westerly then westerly, at which point it enters woodland and descends 70 feet in a waterfall called Stockghyll Force. Up to this point the ghyll runs roughly in parallel with Kirkstone Road. It then flows canalized through the town of Ambleside in a series of low waterfalls falls and rapids, and passes under several bridges, notably that carrying Bridge House, a tiny 17th- or 18th-century house, said to be the most photographed building in the Lake District, now used as an information centre by the National Trust. A final canalized stretch takes it through Rothay Park, at the end of which it empties into the River Rothay.

== Flooding ==
Stock Ghyll reacts quickly to heavy rain events because so much of its catchment comes from steeply-sloping fellsides. In December 2015 heavy rainfall produced by Storm Desmond resulted in Stock Ghyll breaking through various informal flood defences and flooding a wide area between the A591 and the River Rothay. In July 1998 a flash flood almost cost the lives of two children playing in the ghyll behind the Salutation Hotel. Stock Ghyll is also recorded to have flooded in July 1873, June 1910, July 1929, June and November 1931, September 1950, and June 1953.

== Stockghyll Force ==
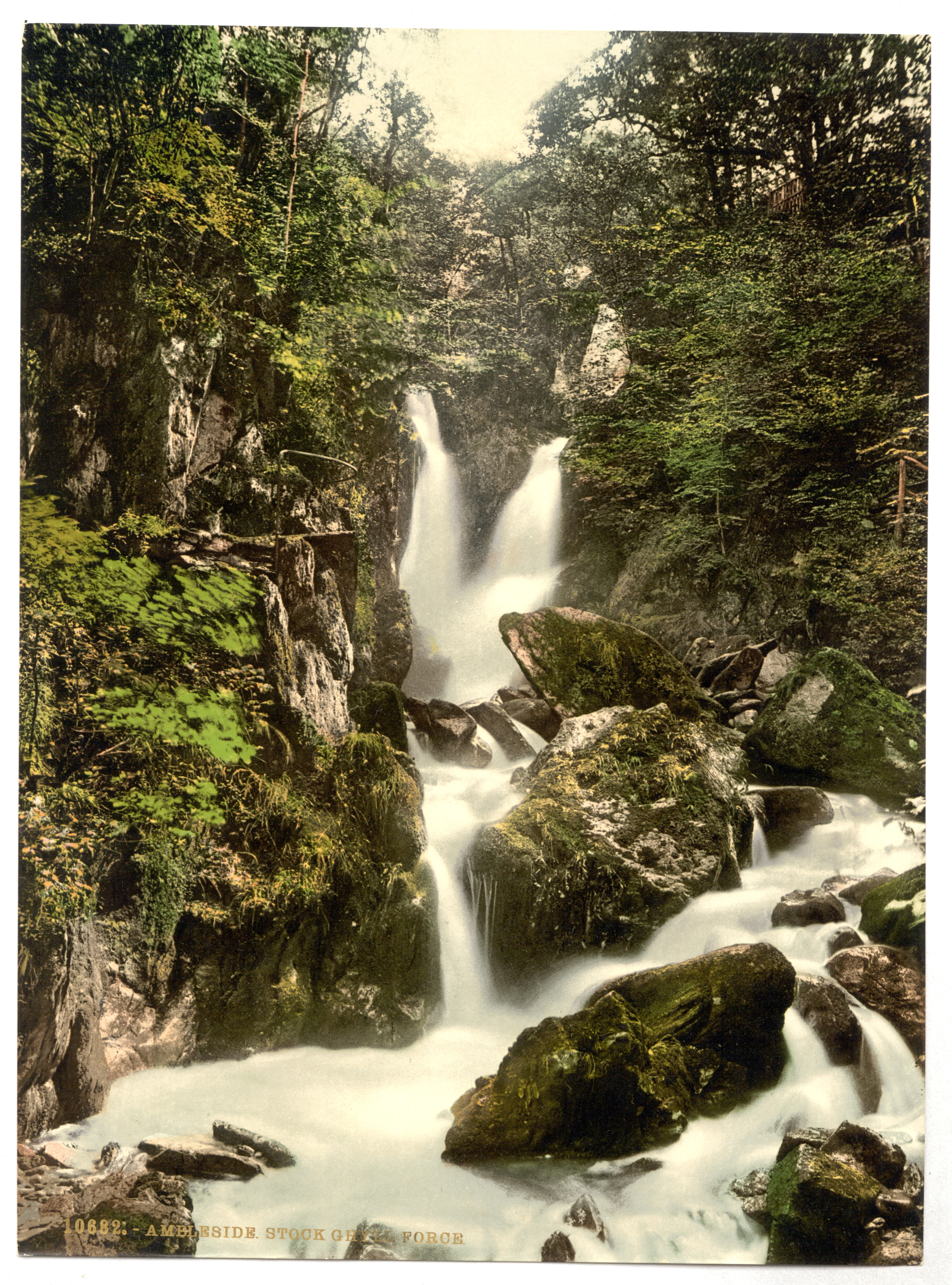
Stock Ghyll Force

Stockghyll Force, about half a mile east of Ambleside town centre, is a waterfall in a series of cascades totalling 70 feet in height. Stock Ghyll divides into two channels at the top of the waterfall, and then into three, all of which are finally reunited. The falls are surrounded by woodland composed of mixed trees in which beech predominates; in spring many daffodils can be seen at the bottom. There is a railed viewpoint from which the waterfall can be seen. Stockghyll Force can be accessed from Ambleside by taking first Stockghyll Lane and then a well-signposted footpath.

== Early tourism ==
Thomas West's pioneering Guide to the Lakes (1778) advises tourists to visit Stockghyll Force on account of its "singular beauty and distinguished features" even in dry seasons. Joseph Budworth devoted a chapter of his A Fortnight's Ramble to the Lakes in Westmoreland, Lancashire, and Cumberland (1792) to Stockghyll Force. He was particularly struck by the "rocky, yet verdant, island, which separates the upper fall, and makes two distinct flushes", and assured his reader that, having made the short walk to the falls "you will be repaid by too impressive a sight ever to leave your memory, and which is calculated to remind you of the softest moments of your life". In 1818 John Keats visited the falls, and in a letter to a friend described the streams into which Stock Ghyll is here divided:

At the same time the different falls have as different characters; the first darting down the slate-rock like a rocket; the second spreading out like a fan—the third dashed into a mist—and the one on the other side of the rock a sort of mixture of all these. We afterwards moved away a space, and saw nearly the whole more mild, streaming silverly through the trees. What astonishes me more than any thing is the tone, the coloring, the slate, the stone, the moss, the rock-weed; or, if I may so say, the intellect, the countenance of such places. The space, the magnitude of mountains and waterfalls are well imagined before one sees them; but this countenance or intellectual tone must surpass every imagination and defy any remembrance. I shall learn poetry here.

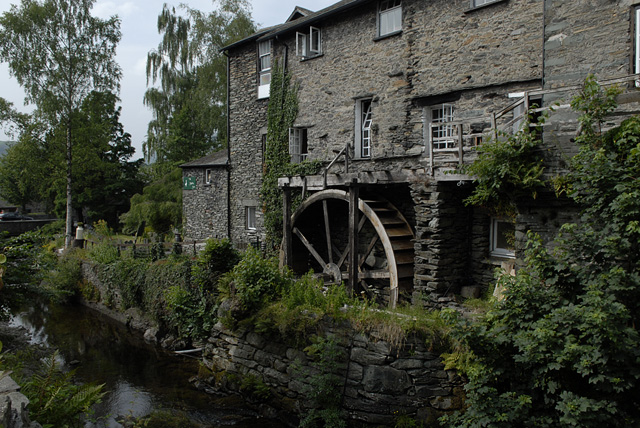
Restored waterwheel in Ambleside beside Stock Ghyll

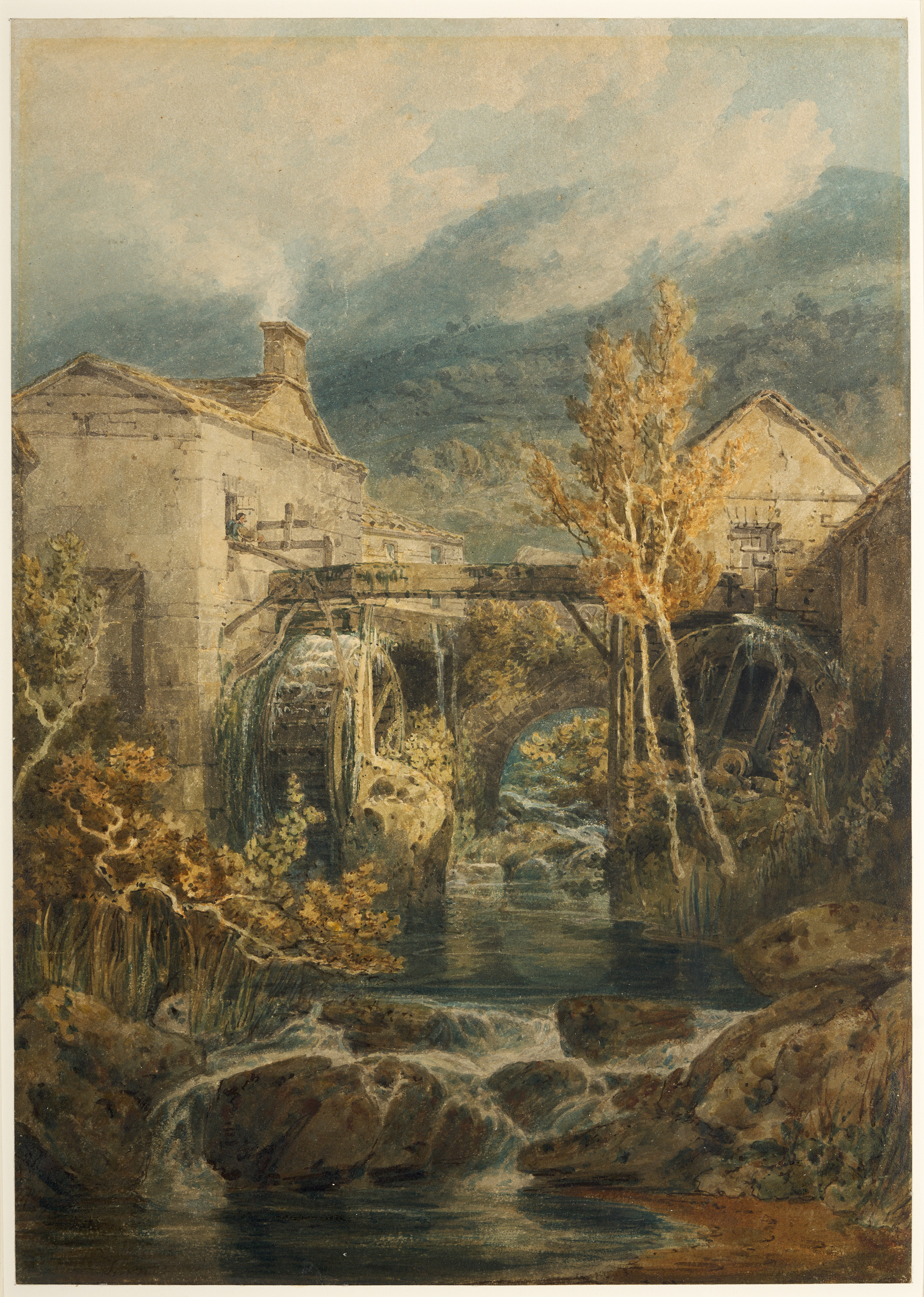
J. M. W. Turner The Old Mill, Ambleside (1798)

William Wordsworth, writing in 1835, recommended visitors to Ambleside to spend three minutes looking at the course of Stock Ghyll through the village, adding that "Stockgill-force, upon the same stream, will have been mentioned to you as one of the sights of the neighbourhood". Victorian writers confirm that the waterfall was the standard sight of Ambleside, the first that any tourist went to visit. Indeed it was so often and so easily seen that the writer Harriet Martineau reported that "it is the fashion to speak lightly of this waterfall", familiarity breeding contempt, though she herself thought it an "exquisite waterfall...Grander cataracts there may be—scarcely a more beautiful one".

== Industry ==
Stock Ghyll formerly powered a series of fulling mills and bobbin mills in the centre of Ambleside, most of which still survive, though repurposed, and give some idea of how the stream looked in the 19th century. One such, called the Old Corn Mill, was originally built as the manorial mill in 1335, rebuilt in 1680, and finally converted to shops in the 1970s. The Horrax mill was one of the best known of the Lake District bobbin mills, built around 1840 to supply the Lancashire cotton mills with bobbins made from local coppiced wood, though it also produced a wide range of other wooden objects. It has since been converted to holiday flatlets.

== In art ==
Various scenes along Stock Ghyll have long been popular with artists. Bridge House has been painted by J. M. W. Turner and John Ruskin, and in the 20th century by Kurt Schwitters.

Harriet Martineau noted that "The view of the mill and the rocky channel of the Stock on the left of the bridge is the one which every artist sketches as he passes by; and if there is in the Exhibition in London, in any year, a View at Ambleside, it is probably this". A notable example is Turner's watercolour The Old Mill, Ambleside (1798), which includes Stock Ghyll. The same subject was painted in oils by Thomas Miles Richardson and in watercolour by Alfred William Hunt.

Though the influential writer William Gilpin, apostle of the picturesque, condemned Stock Ghyll Force as "the most unpicturesque we could have", others differed. His contemporaries Joseph Farington and Francis Towne, for example, painted the Force twice and three times respectively. More recently, Jeremy Gardiner's Stockghyll Force (2011) forms part of a series of paintings of Lake District waterfalls.
