= River Rothay =

River in Cumbria, England

Coordinates: 54.48777°N 3.07280°W

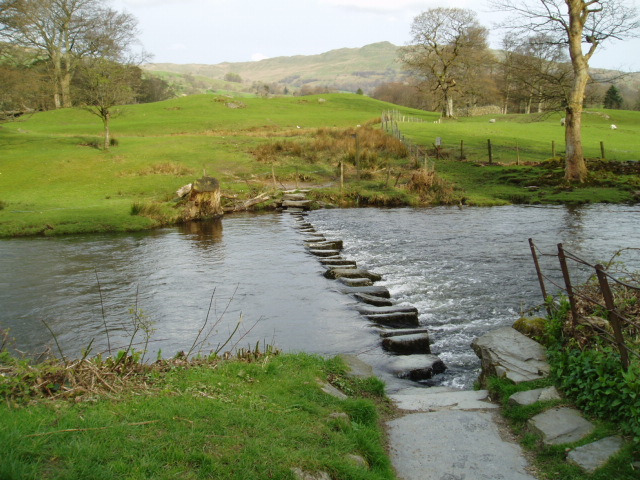
Stepping stones on the Rothay near Rydal

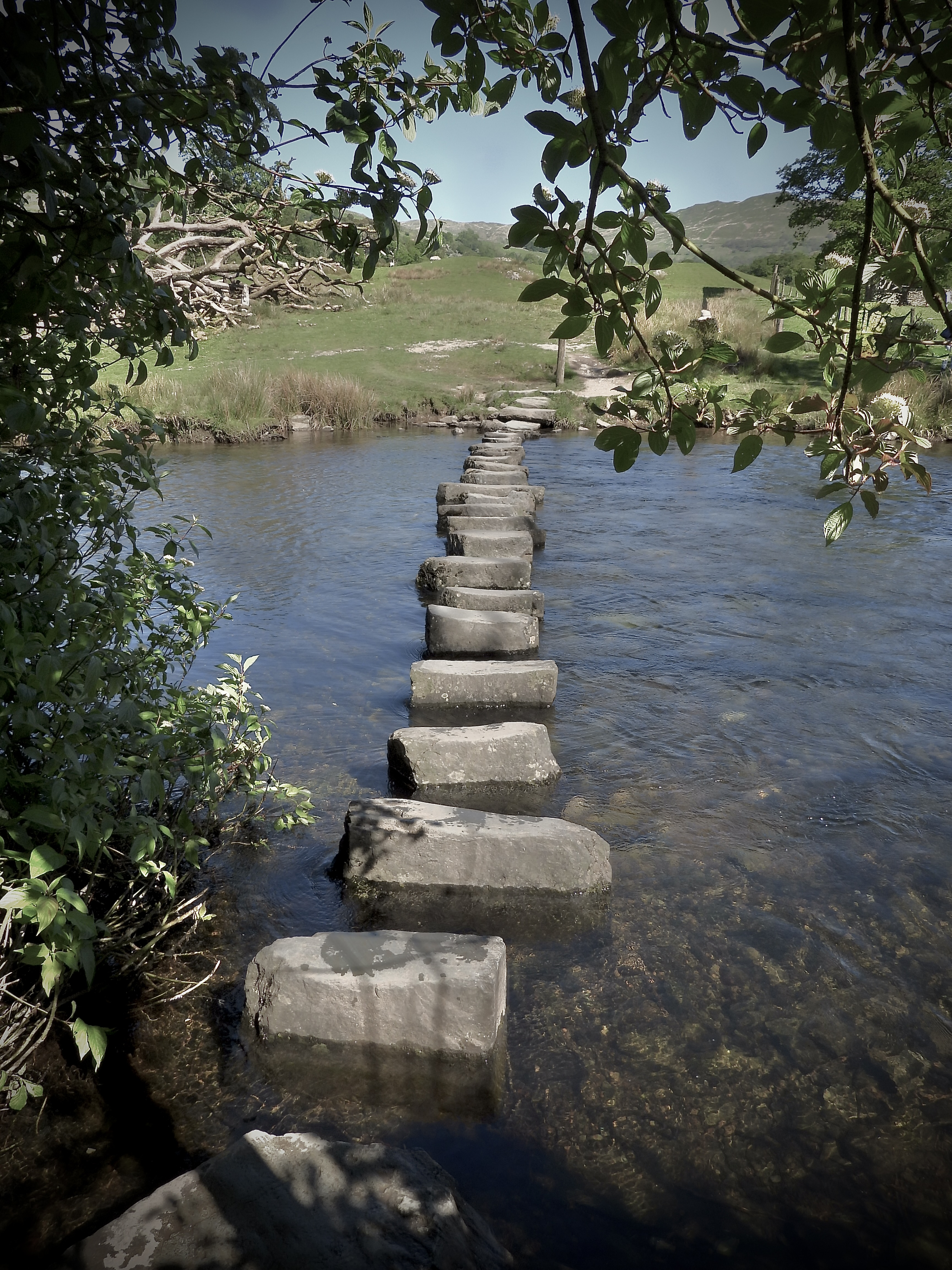
The Stepping Stones of Ambleseide over the River Rothay (2026).

The Rothay is a spate river of the Lake District in north-west England. Its name comes from Old Norse and translates literally as the red one. This has come to mean trout river. It rises close to Rough Crag above Dunmail Raise at a point about 1542 feet (470 m) above sea level (grid reference NY306108). Its catchment area covers Grasmere Common including Easedale Tarn, the southern flanks of Fairfield, and several of the fells to the east of Dunmail Raise, including Great Rigg, Rydal Fell, Scandale Fell and Heron Pike.

From its source the Rothay descends through the valley of Greenburn Bottom to the hamlet of Helmside not far from the main A591 road over Dunmail Raise. Just north of the village of Grasmere the river subsumes Easedale Gill and Sour Milk Gill, the latter flowing out of Easedale Tarn. In the village the river flows close to the churchyard where the poet Wordsworth is buried. The Rothay then flows into the head of the lake of Grasmere (elevation 208 feet/63 m). As well as replenishing Grasmere, the Rothay also drains it, flowing for just half a mile (800 m) from the southern end of the lake before replenishing Rydal Water (elevation 181 feet/55 m) at its western extremity. The Rothay drains Rydal from its easternmost point and then flows in a general southerly direction for about three miles (4.8 km) before merging with the River Brathay at Croft Lodge south-west of Ambleside. From there the rivers flow into the northern end of Windermere. In addition to those tributaries already noted, several others are subsumed by the Rothay.

About a mile (1.6 km) north of Ambleside the Rothay is crossed by a well-known set of stepping stones. Several sections of the Rothay are popular with canoeists, including the section between Grasmere and Rydal; the river is graded as 2+. The Rothay is a trout fishery where brown trout can be caught. Anglers should enquire locally about licences (an Environment Agency Rod Licence is required).

The River Rothay is wholly within the historic county of Westmorland. After local government reorganisation in 1974 the river was in the administrative county of Cumbria. Following further local government reorganisation in 2023 the river flows within the council area administered by Westmorland and Furness Council.

== See also ==
- Cunsey Beck
- River Leven
- Trout Beck
- Rotha Clay
- Rydal Beck
- Stock Ghyll
