= Wansfell =

Mountain in the English Lake District, Cumbria, England

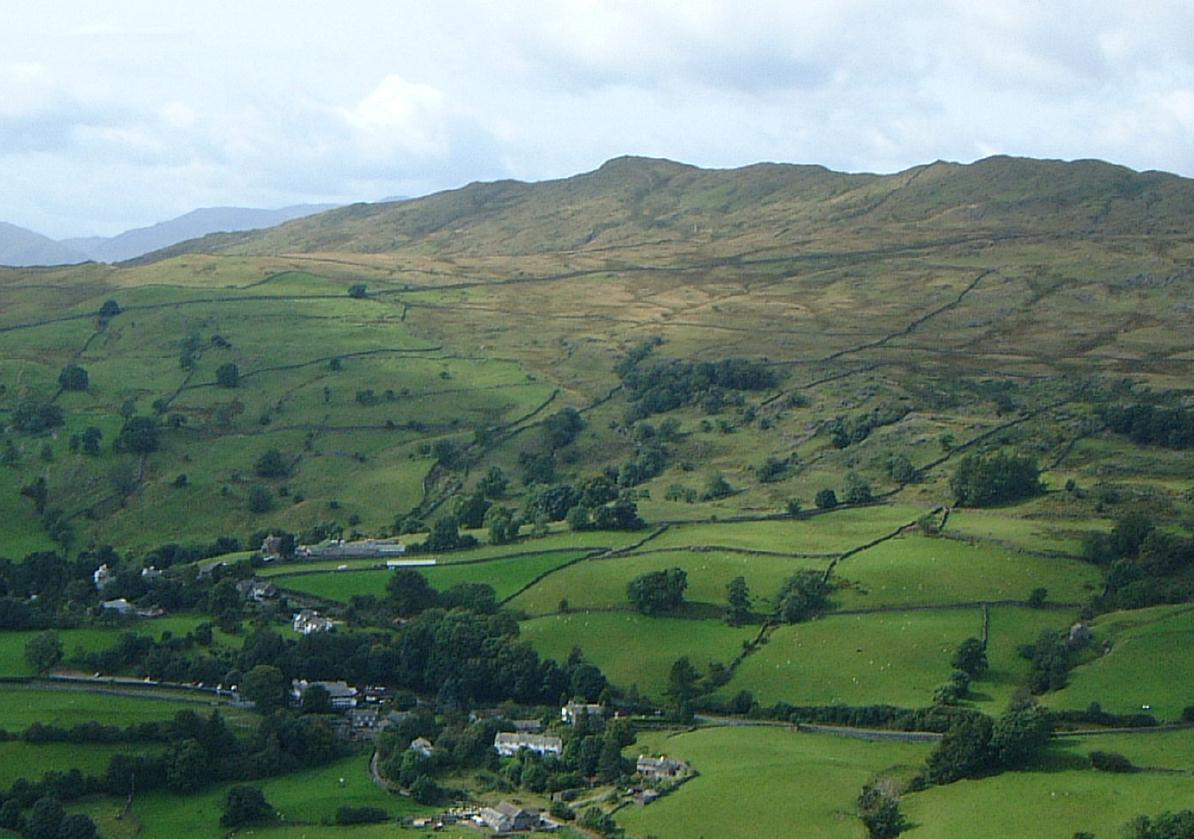
- Wansfell above Troutbeck village

Highest point
- Elevation: 486.9 m (1,597 ft)
- Prominence: 147.7 m
- Parent peak: Caudale Moor
- Listing: Wainwright
- Coordinates: 54°26′16″N 2°55′19″W

Geography
- Location within the Lake District
- Location: Cumbria, England
- Parent range: Lake District, Far Eastern Fells
- OS grid: NY403051
- Topo map: OS Landranger 90, OS Explorer 7

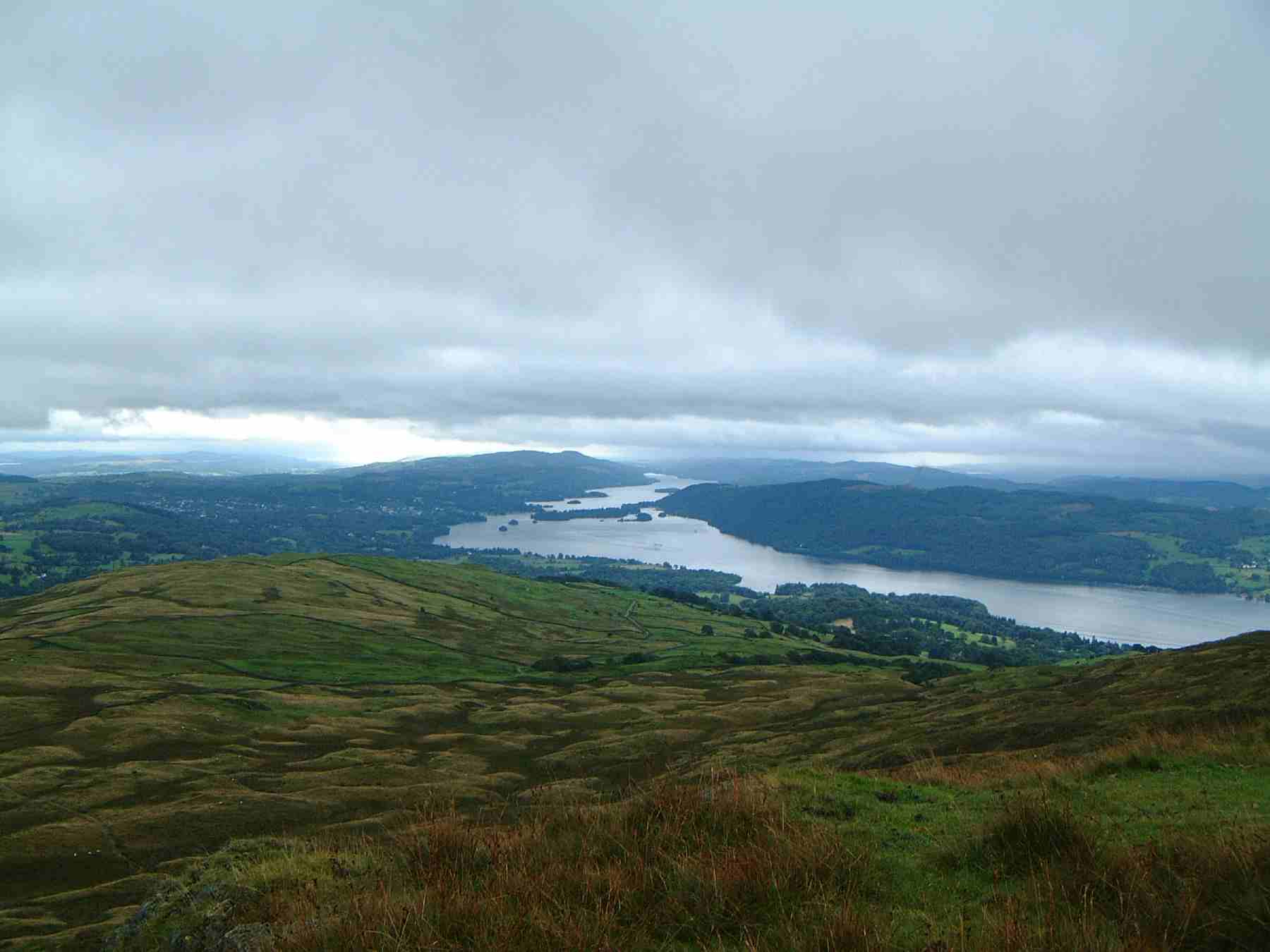
Looking south from Wansfell Pike to Windermere.

Wansfell is a fell in English Lake District situated 1 1/2 miles (2.4 kilometres) east of the town of Ambleside. The fell is part of the long southern ridge of Caudale Moor and occupies the swath of territory between Ambleside and the Troutbeck valley.

== Topography ==
Wansfell has an extensive summit ridge with two tops. The highest point of the fell is called Baystones with a height of 488 m (1,601 ft), while Wansfell Pike, which lies a kilometre to the south west reaches an elevation of 482 m (1,581 ft). Of the two summits, Wansfell Pike is regarded as the “true” summit of the fell by many fell walkers because of its superior view, even though it is the lower of the pair.

Despite its modest elevation, Wansfell has significant topographic prominence, being linked to the higher fell of Caudale Moor by a col near the Kirkstone Pass road (A592) with a height of around 339.2 metres. This gives the fell a prominence of 147.7 metres, which means it just fails to achieve the necessary prominence to be a Marilyn.

The summit was deleted from the original list of Marilyns in 1999 but was re-instated due to a change in the recorded summit position. A team including John Barnard surveyed the hill on 18 September 2009 and on 11 February 2010 announced that the summit and col height measurements were 486.9m and 339.2m respectively, and thus it was once again removed from the list of Marilyns.

Wansfell has strong connections to Ambleside and is seen as very much belonging to the town, with Bill Birkett saying “Wansfell is to Ambleside what St. Pauls is to London”. The popularity of the ascent from Ambleside led to severe erosion which became so bad that the path underwent restoration work in the late 1990s using stone blocks. Sections of the path now resemble a very irregular stone staircase.

== Name ==
The fell's name is thought to originate from the Old Norse language and can draw a parallel with Wansdyke in Somerset in that it is named after the main Norse god and means “Woden's Fell”.

== Fell race ==
Wansfell hosts a popular short fell race which takes place annually between Christmas and the New Year, the winning runner usually taking around 20 minutes to complete the four-kilometre course.

== Ascents ==
The fell is predominantly ascended from Ambleside using the road which leaves the town centre and goes past Stockghyll Force waterfall before bearing right onto the restored footpath which is followed to the summit. An ascent is also possible from Troutbeck, on the eastern side of the fell, following a farm track called Nanny Lane until the open fell is reached from where it is an easy climb to the summit. A path through Skelghyll Wood ascends via Kelsick Scar and visits a disused aqueduct observatory on the way.

Wansfell is on the route of the Windermere Way, a long-distance path that circumambulates Windermere.

== Summits ==
The fell's two summits are linked by a dry stone wall. Wansfell Pike is the lower of the two but has a more attractive rocky top and a better view, with Windermere looking particularly attractive to the south. The highest point (Baystones) is a grassy hummock marked by a cairn.
