= Rossett Pike =

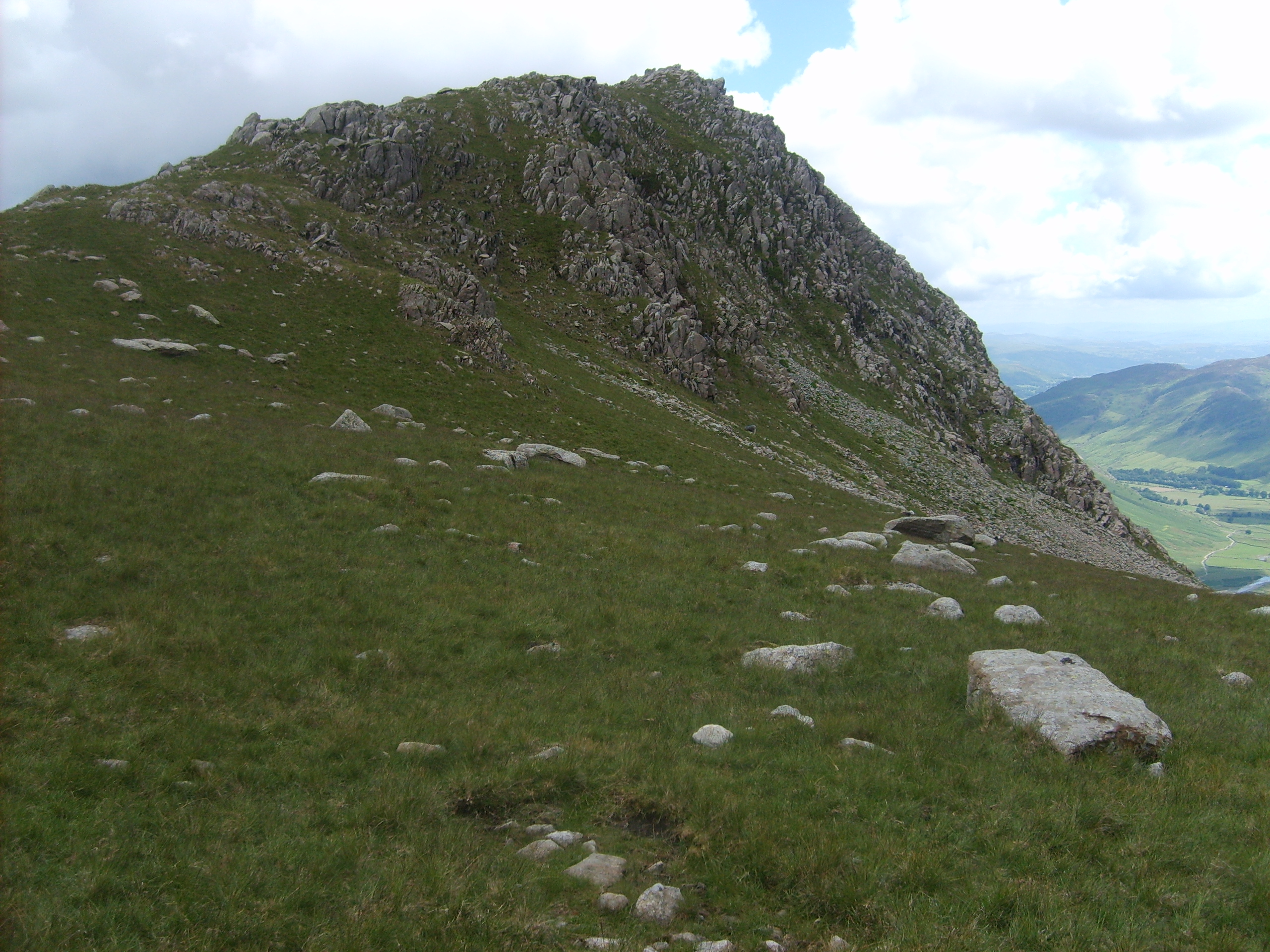

Highest point
- Elevation: 651 m (2,136 ft)
- Prominence: c. 35 m (115 ft)
- Parent peak: Bowfell
- Listing: Hewitt, Wainwright, Nuttall
- Coordinates: 54°27′30″N 3°09′36″W

Geography
- Location within the Lake District Location within the former Allerdale Borough Location within the former South Lakeland district
- Location: Cumbria, England
- Parent range: Lake District, Southern Fells
- OS grid: NY249076
- Topo map: OS Explorer OL6

Rossett Pike is a fell in the English Lake District. It is located at the head of Mickleden, one of two tributary valleys of Great Langdale.

== Topography ==
A bridge of high ground connects the Southern and Central Fells, running from Bow Fell in the Scafells to Pike of Stickle, one of the Langdale Pikes. Rossett Pike is the high point of this ridge, bordered by Mickleden in the south and Langstrath to the north.

A narrow ridge falls north east from Bow Fell, constricted between Angle Tarn and the steep defile of Rossett Gill rising up from Mickleden. Angle Tarn is a feeder of the Langstrath and occupies a circular corrie beneath Hanging Knotts, small trout lurking in its 50 ft (15 m) depths. Beyond this pinch point the ridge steps down over the three tops of Rossett Pike, Buck Pike, 1,988 ft (606 m), and Black Crag, 1,929 ft (588 m). All are considered to be part of the same fell by most writers. although this view is not universal, with Black Crags having enough re-ascent to qualify as a separate hill by some measures.

The ridge continues north east, narrowing again above Langdale Combe. At this point it is crossed by Stake Pass, a walkers' thoroughfare running from Great Langdale to Borrowdale via the Langstrath. It now sees increased traffic as a part of the popular Cumbria Way long distance route. Beyond the Stake with its small summit tarn the ridge turns east and broadens, becoming indistinct as it crosses Martcrag Moor before rising to the Langdale Pikes.

The Mickleden flanks of Rossett Pike rise above an array of green moraines to a tier of crags running below the ridgeline. In addition to Black Crag there is Rossett Crag, set just beneath the summit. The northern face is less steep, falling only half as far to the upper gathering grounds of the Langstrath.

== Geology ==
The volcaniclastic sandstone of the Seathwaite Fell Formation predominates, with the pebbly sandstone and breccia of the Pavey Ark Member exposed on the Langdale face.

== Summit ==
The summit is marked by a small cairn and gives fine views of the Langdale Pikes although the looming presence of Bow Fell restricts the westward vista. A slightly lower cairn to the east brings the abyss of the head of Mickleden into view.

== Ascents ==
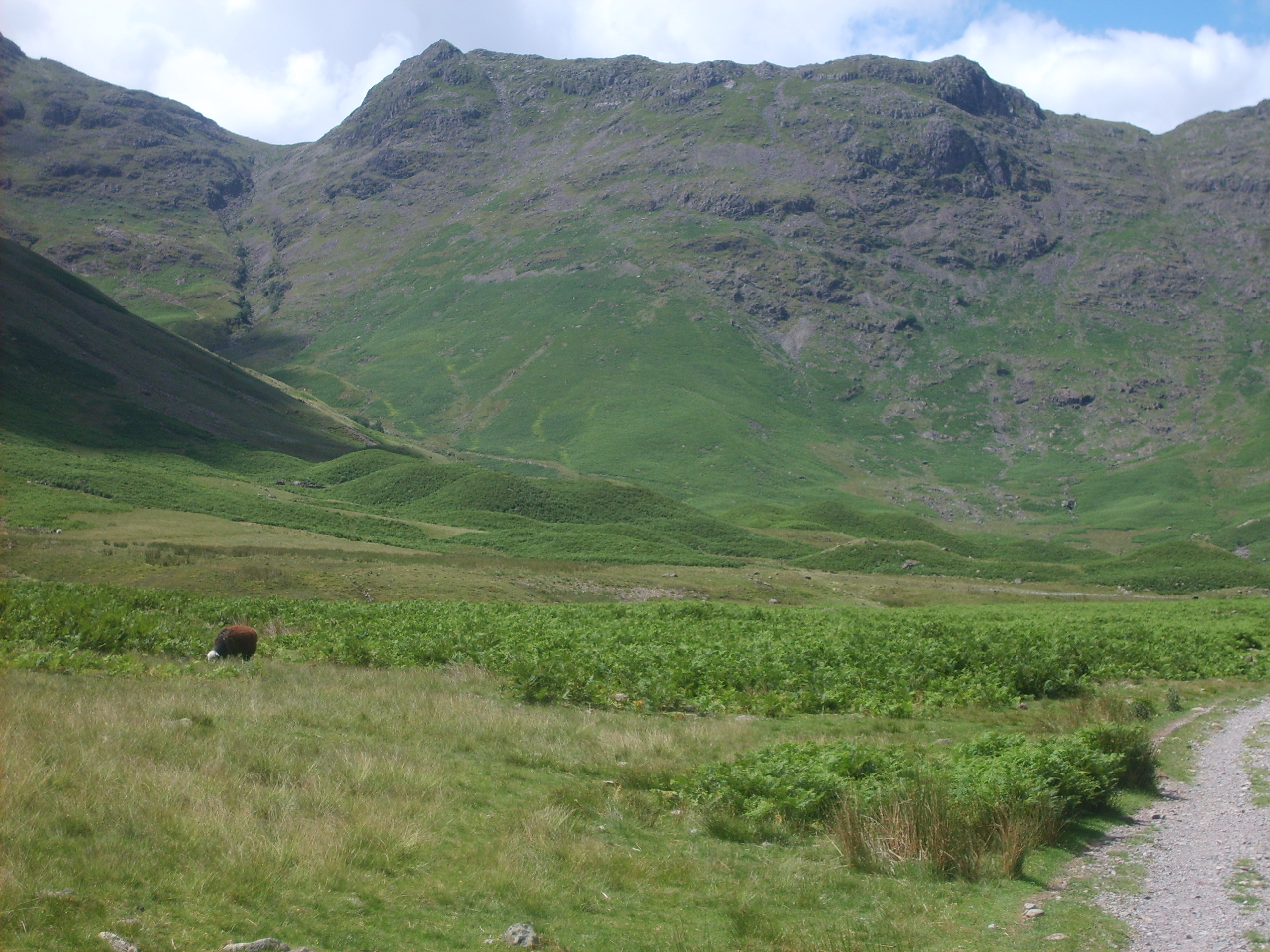
Rossett Pike as seen from Mickleden; Rossett Gill is directly below the depression on the left.

The pass at Rossett Gill provides a second major walking route out of Great Langdale, this path heading via Angle Tarn to Esk Hause. Whilst perhaps conceived as a means of reaching distant Wasdale, it is now more commonly used as a fellwalkers' springboard to the Scafells. Alfred Wainwright pilloried the route in his influential Pictorial Guide to the Lakeland Fells, describing it as "almost certainly the least liked [foot-pass], due not to its steepness but its stoniness (a condition worsening year by year as swarming legions of booted pedestrians grind away the scanty vestiges of grass and soil)." He suggested renewed use of the old 'Pony Route' which makes a more circuitous climb to the south. In more recent times the more direct route has seen considerable stone pitching and is much improved.

Direct climbs of Rossett Pike are almost invariably made via one of the neighbouring passes. Rossett Gill provides the shorter route from Great Langdale, but the Stake is also perfectly practicable. From Stonethwaite in Borrowdale, Stake Pass is the primary means of ascent although Angle Tarn can also be reached. Rossett Pike is also popular as an indirect climb when taken as a top in the round of Great Langale, a long but glorious ridge walk.
