= Langdale Pike =

Langdale Pike may refer to:

- Langdale Pike (character), a fictional character in The Adventure of the Three Gables, a Sherlock Holmes story by Sir Arthur Conan Doyle
- Langdale Pikes, a group of peaks in the Lake District
