= Thunacar Knott =

Fell in the Lake District, Cumbria, England

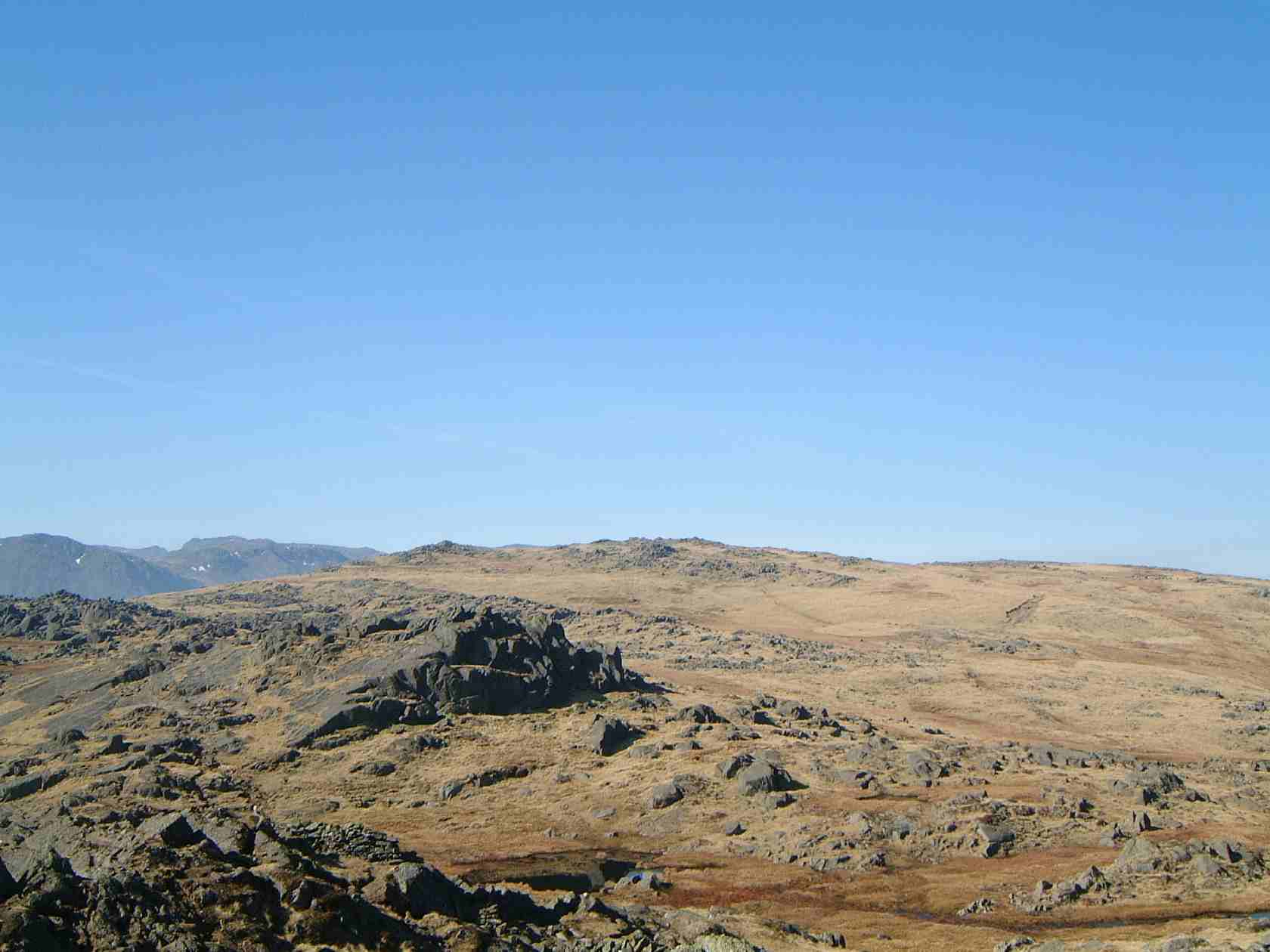
- Thunacar Knott seen from Pavey Ark; the fell summit is the insignificant point on the moorland in the picture centre

Highest point
- Elevation: 723 m (2,372 ft)
- Prominence: c. 27 m (90 ft)
- Parent peak: Harrison Stickle
- Listing: Wainwright, Nuttall
- Coordinates: 54°27′41″N 3°06′50″W

Geography
- Location within the Lake District
- Location: Cumbria, England
- Parent range: Lake District, Central Fells
- OS grid: NY279079
- Topo map: OS Explorer OL6

Thunacar Knott is a fell in the central part of the English Lake District in the county of Cumbria.

== Topography ==
The main spine of the Central Fells runs south from Bleaberry Fell to High Raise, before turning sharply east en route for Blea Rigg and Loughrigg Fell. A secondary ridge projects southward from High Raise, terminating in the Langdale Pikes. These are a high rocky parapet looking down upon the valley of Great Langdale, fringing an area of moorland behind. This upland plateau has its highpoint in Thunacar Knott.

Recent surveys give the fell a height of 723 metres (2,372 ft), a significant increase to the 2,351 feet given by Alfred Wainwright in his Pictorial Guides to the Lakeland Fells. The fell is situated in Great Langdale in the midst of one of the most popular areas for walking in the district, surrounded by the much-loved Langdale fells of Harrison Stickle, Pike of Stickle, Loft Crag and Pavey Ark. Despite this, Thunacar Knott is often by-passed by walkers because of its uninspiring appearance, being just a slight rise on the moorland between Harrison Stickle and High Raise. Indeed, many people do not regard it as a separate fell, considering it just the outlying highest point of the spectacular Pavey Ark cliffs. Wainwright’s comments on the fell are not positive, saying: ‘Thunacar Knott is completely unphotogenic…this uninspiring characteristic extends to the whole fell, which is quite deficient in interest.’

== Geology ==
Drift deposits cover most of the fell, but in the summit area there are outcrops of the underlying Seathwaite Fell Formation. This consists of volcaniclastic sandstone with interbeds of tuff, lapilli-tuff and conglomerate.

== Ascents ==
Many walkers feel compelled to climb Thunacar Knott in order to complete their list of ‘Wainwright’ fells and they usually do this while climbing the more popular neighbouring fells. The usual starting point is the New Dungeon Ghyll Hotel in Great Langdale and the route goes via Stickle Ghyll, Stickle Tarn and Pavey Ark. Thunacar Knott can also be climbed from Stonethwaite in Borrowdale, via Langstrath and the Stake Pass.

== Summit ==
The summit of the fell has a small tarn and two tops. The southern top is the highest point while the northern top has the more significant cairn and is often regarded as the true summit. Even though Thunacar Knott is quite insignificant it is slightly higher than all the surrounding area and gives good all-round views, the prospect to the west being especially fine.

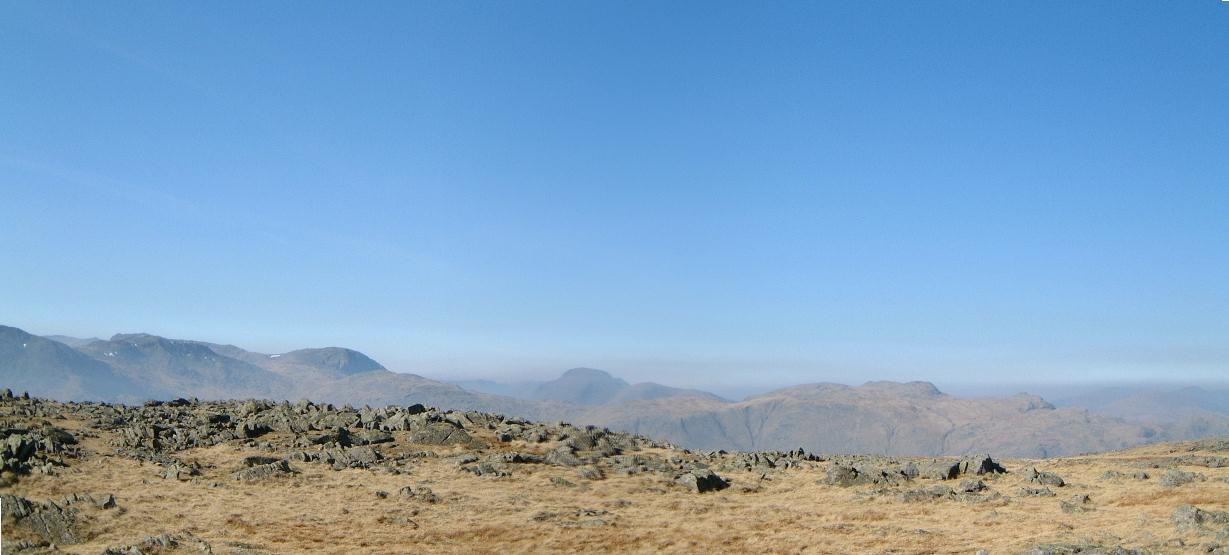
The view westerly from Thunacar Knott showing (from l to r) the Scafells, Great End, Great Gable and Glaramara
