= Clare Fell =

British archaeologist

- Born: 10 October 1912; Ulverston, England
- Died: 17 July 2002 (aged 89); Sandside, Beetham, England
- Education: Newnham College, Cambridge (M.A.)
- Known for: Studying the Langdale axe industry in Cumbria
- Scientific career
- Fields: Archaeology
- Workplaces: Museum of Archaeology and Anthropology, University of Cambridge

Clare Isobel Fell (10 October 1912 – 17 July 2002) was a British archaeologist.

She was born in Ulverston, Lancashire (now Cumbria), England. She read archaeology at Newnham College, Cambridge in the 1930s. The university did not allow women to take degrees at that time, and she received her MA in 1948. After the Second World War she worked at the Museum of Archaeology and Anthropology in Cambridge before moving back to Ulverston in 1953.

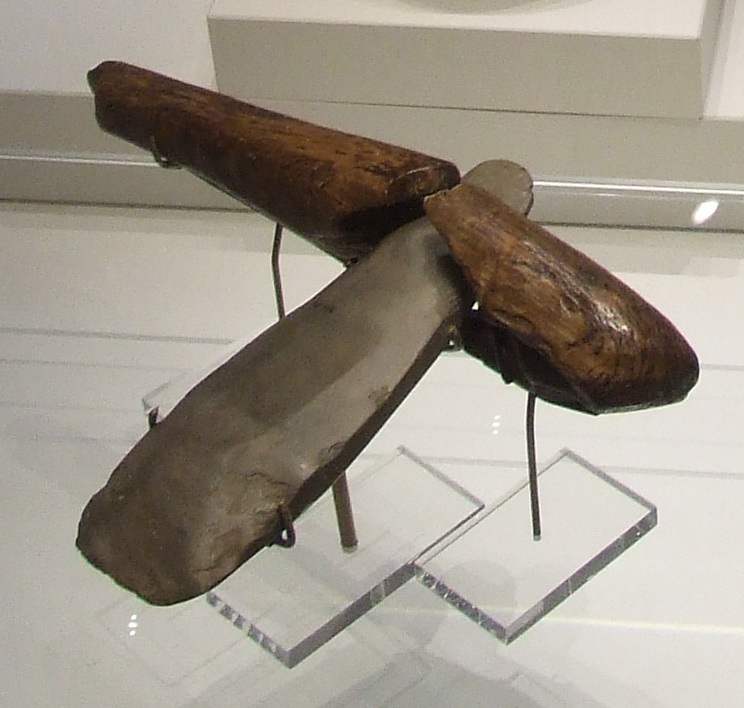
A Neolithic stone axe from Cumbria, now in the British Museum. Fell was interested in the analysis of individual axes.

In 1949 she worked on Grahame Clark's excavations at the Star Carr Mesolithic site in Yorkshire. Around the same time she began studying the Langdale axe industry in Cumbria, the project for which she is perhaps best remembered. She was not the first person to notice that Neolithic axes had been produced in Great Langdale, but she was able to demonstrate the scale of the activity there, and used the word "factory" to describe it. She also guessed correctly that other quarries would be found on outcrops of volcanic tuff in the Lake District.

Fell kept up to date with scientific advances and collaborated with Winifred Pennington in the study of the effects of humans on the environment, resulting in pioneering pollen analyses for prehistoric artefact layers from sites in Cumbria.

== Television appearance ==
Fell appeared in a discussion panel on the BBC television series Animal, Vegetable, Mineral? on 9 July 1953. The programme was directed by David Attenborough.

== Bibliography ==
- Clare Fell, The Great Langdale stone-axe factory, Trans Cumberland and Westmorland Antiq and Arch Soc, 50, 1-13 (1950).
