= Loft Crag =

Mountain in the English Lake District, Cumbria, England

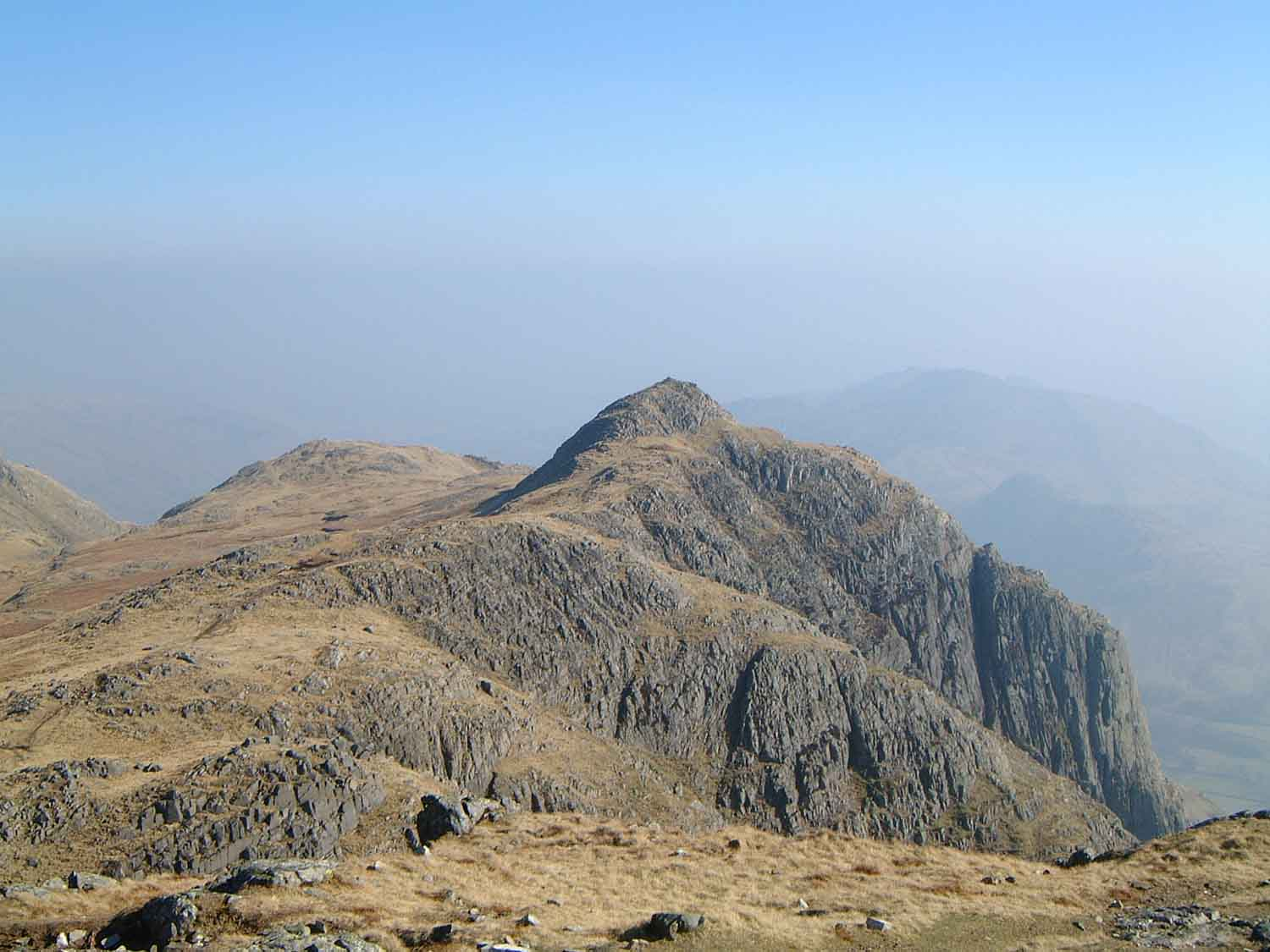
- Loft Crag seen from Pike o‘ Stickle; Gimmer Crag is below the summit

Highest point
- Elevation: 682 m (2,238 ft)
- Prominence: c. 25 m (80 ft)
- Parent peak: Pike of Stickle
- Listing: Wainwright, Nuttall
- Coordinates: 54°27′15″N 3°07′00″W

Geography
- Location within the Lake District
- Location: Cumbria, England
- Parent range: Lake District, Central Fells
- OS grid: NY277071
- Topo map: OS Explorer OL6

Loft Crag is a fell in the English Lake District, situated nine kilometres (5 1/2 miles) west of Ambleside in the valley of Great Langdale. Along with the neighbouring fells of Harrison Stickle and Pike of Stickle it forms the picturesque Langdale Pikes, which when viewed from the area around Elterwater village gives one of the best-known views in the National Park.

== Topography ==
The Langdale Pikes form a parapet to the lower hinterland to their north. From 'behind' they are unimpressive, but their southern faces fall full length over crags to the floor of Langdale, nearly 2,000 feet (610 metres) below. Loft Crag has a peaked summit which apes in lesser proportion the fine knoll of Pike of Stickle. To the east, between Loft Crag and Harrison Stickle is the subsidiary top of Thorn Crag. This is sometimes counted as a Langdale Pike in its own right, but only Birkett amongst the major guidebooks takes this view.

== Ascents ==
Loft Crag has a summit elevation of 2,238 feet (682 metres). It lies between Harrison Stickle and Pike o' Stickle and is usually climbed in conjunction with these two peaks. The starting place for the direct ascent of the fell is The New Dungeon Ghyll Hotel in Great Langdale. A path leads north-westerly across the hillside passing Dungeon Ghyll Force waterfall and going between Thorn Crag and Gimmer Crag to a col between Loft Crag and Harrison Stickle. From there it is a straightforward climb to the summit. A more circuitous ascent can be undertaken from the same starting point but taking the well trodden (and repaired) path up Stickle Ghyll to Stickle Tarn. From here the fells of Pavey Ark and Thunacar Knott can be climbed before tackling the three Langdale Pikes.

== Summit and Gimmer Crag ==
Loft Crag is a fine viewpoint which gives an attractive vista of the fells around Great Langdale. Because the fell juts further out into the valley than the other two Langdale Pikes, it gives a more impressive and full view of the valley. The fell has a small sharp summit below which rises Gimmer Crag, which is one of the top rock climbing venues in the Lake District. The crag is made of volcaniclastic siltstone and mudstone. Climbing in the Lake District was pioneered in the early 1880s by Walter Parry Haskett Smith.
