= Stickle Tarn, Langdale =

Upland lake in Cumbria, England

Stickle Tarn
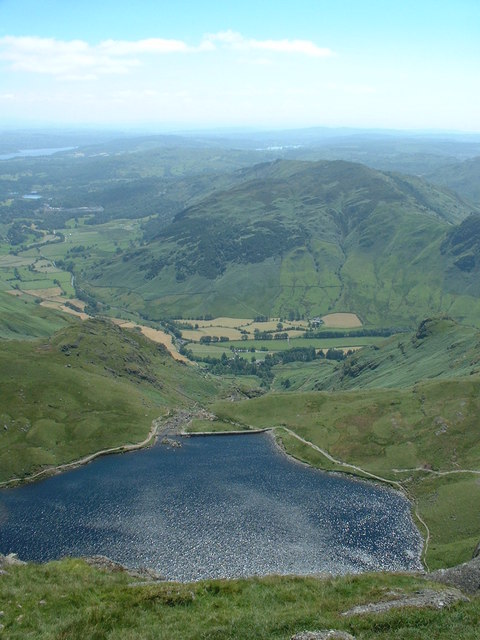
- Stickle Tarn from above

- Location in the Lake District National Park Location in South Lakeland, Cumbria
- Location: England
- Coordinates: 54°27′31″N 3°6′9″W
- Type: tarn (lake)
- Basin countries: United Kingdom
- Max. depth: 50 ft (15 m)
- Surface elevation: 473 m (1,552 ft)
- Islands: 2

Stickle Tarn is a small tarn near Harrison Stickle in Lake District, England. The tarn was enlarged by the building of a stone dam in 1838 and is used to supply water for the inhabitants of Langdale. The tarn is situated in a corrie, flanked on the west side by Harrison Stickle, and on the north by the massive imposing bulk of Pavey Ark's south face. The tarn is frequently visited by fellwalkers ascending to Pavey Ark's summit, or en route to High Raise from Great Langdale.

In February 2015 it was put up for sale by the Lake District National Park Authority, which was seeking to reduce its landholdings in the national park.

The walk from Langdale to Stickle Tarn is one of the most popular in the Lake District, and short enough to be a relatively easy outing for families.
