= Chapel Stile =

Village in Cumbria, England

Coordinates: 54.440353°N 3.048434°W

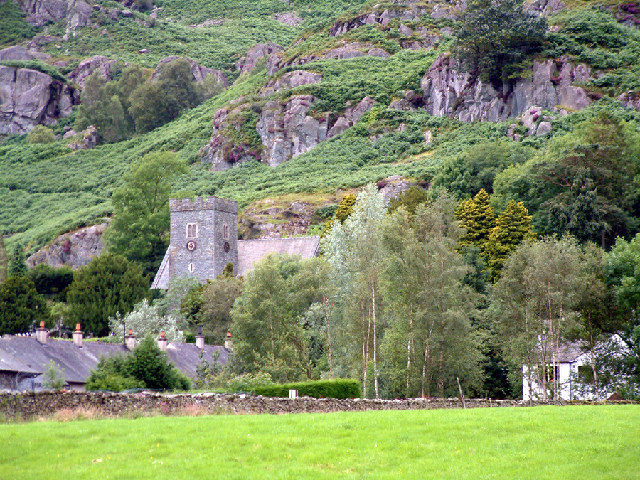
- Church in Chapel Stile

- Location in South Lakeland Location within Cumbria
- OS grid reference: NY320055
- Civil parish: Lakes
- Unitary authority: Westmorland and Furness
- Ceremonial county: Cumbria
- Region: North West
- Country: England
- Sovereign state: United Kingdom
- Post town: AMBLESIDE
- Postcode district: LA22
- Dialling code: 01539
- Police: Cumbria
- Fire: Cumbria
- Ambulance: North West
- UK Parliament: Westmorland and Lonsdale

Chapel Stile is a village in Cumbria, England, located approximately 5 miles northwest of Ambleside, within the Langdale valley. It contains a school, Holy Trinity church, the Co-op and the Wainwrights' Inn (formerly The Langdale Hotel), and a quarry is located in the vicinity.

Couples who choose to get married at the church are traditionally 'tied in' during the service. The local children tie up the church gates and the newlyweds are only released when coins (of small denomination) are thrown to said children.

The Co-op has been established for well over a hundred years.

Chapel Stile also gives access to the Langdale Pikes, Pike o' Stickle and Harrison Stickle. Other notable fells nearby are Pavey Ark, Bowfell and Pike o' Blisco. Rock climbing in the area includes Raven Cragg. A worthy climbing venue and less populated than its famous counterpart further in the Langdale valley at the back of the Old Dungeon Ghyll.

In popular culture, or at least 'underground popular culture', there is a nu jazz track called 'Chapel Stile' by Pretz (N.Cowley).

Due to its location within a popular tourist destination, around 85% of the homes within the community are now either second homes or holiday lets.
