= Pike of Stickle =

Mountain in the English Lake District, Cumbria, England

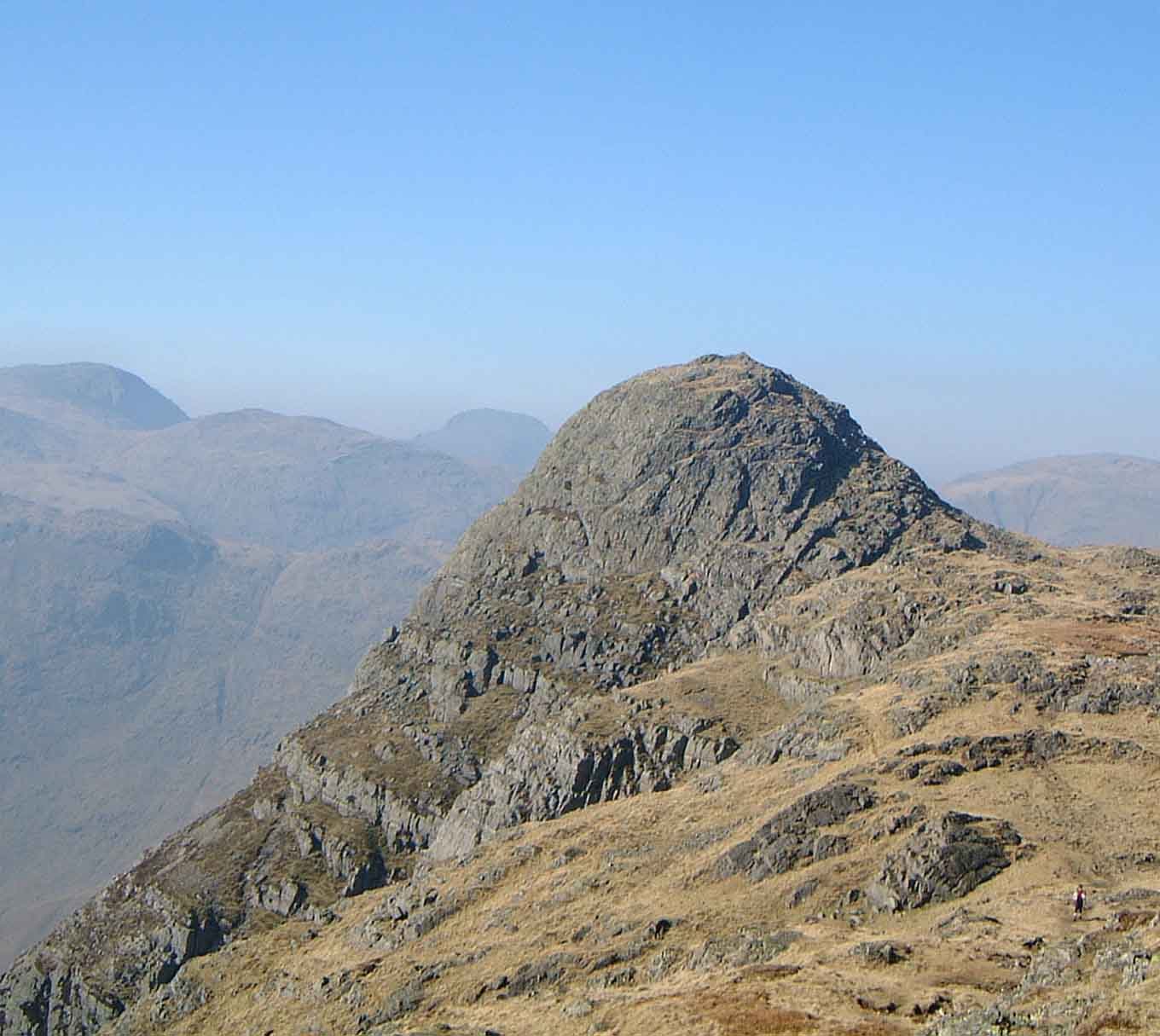
- Pike of Stickle from Loft Crag

Highest point
- Elevation: 709 m (2,326 ft)
- Prominence: c. 54 m
- Parent peak: High Raise
- Listing: Hewitt, Wainwright, Nuttall
- Coordinates: 54°27′21″N 3°07′22″W

Geography
- Location within the Lake District
- Location: Cumbria, England
- Parent range: Lake District, Central Fells
- OS grid: NY273073
- Topo map: OS Explorer OL6

Pike of Stickle, also known as Pike o’ Stickle, is a fell in the English Lake District. It reaches a height of 709 metres (2,326 ft) and is situated in the central part of the national park in the valley of Great Langdale. The fell is one of three fells which make up the picturesque Langdale Pikes (the others being Harrison Stickle and Loft Crag), one of the best-known areas in Lakeland. A "stickle" is a hill with a steep prominent rocky top, while a "pike" is a hill with a peaked summit, the name being therefore partly tautological.

== Topography ==
The Langdale Pikes form a raised rocky parapet around the southern and eastern edges of a high tableland centred upon Thunacar Knott. Pike of Stickle stands at the western end of this system and its crags fall south from the summit, presenting an arresting view from the valley floor 2,000 feet (600 m) below, or from further afield.

Loft Crag stands next along the rampart, with Thorn Crag and Harrison Stickle further to the east. 'Behind' Pike of Stickle to the north is the depression of Harrison Combe, beyond which are the twin tops of Thunacar Knott. Westward the height of the land gradually falls away to Martcrag Moor, a wide plateau with a few small tarns near the summit 1,795 feet (547 m). Martcrag Moor represents the end of the Central Fells as defined by Alfred Wainwright, providing a high-level connection to Rossett Pike in the Southern Fells.

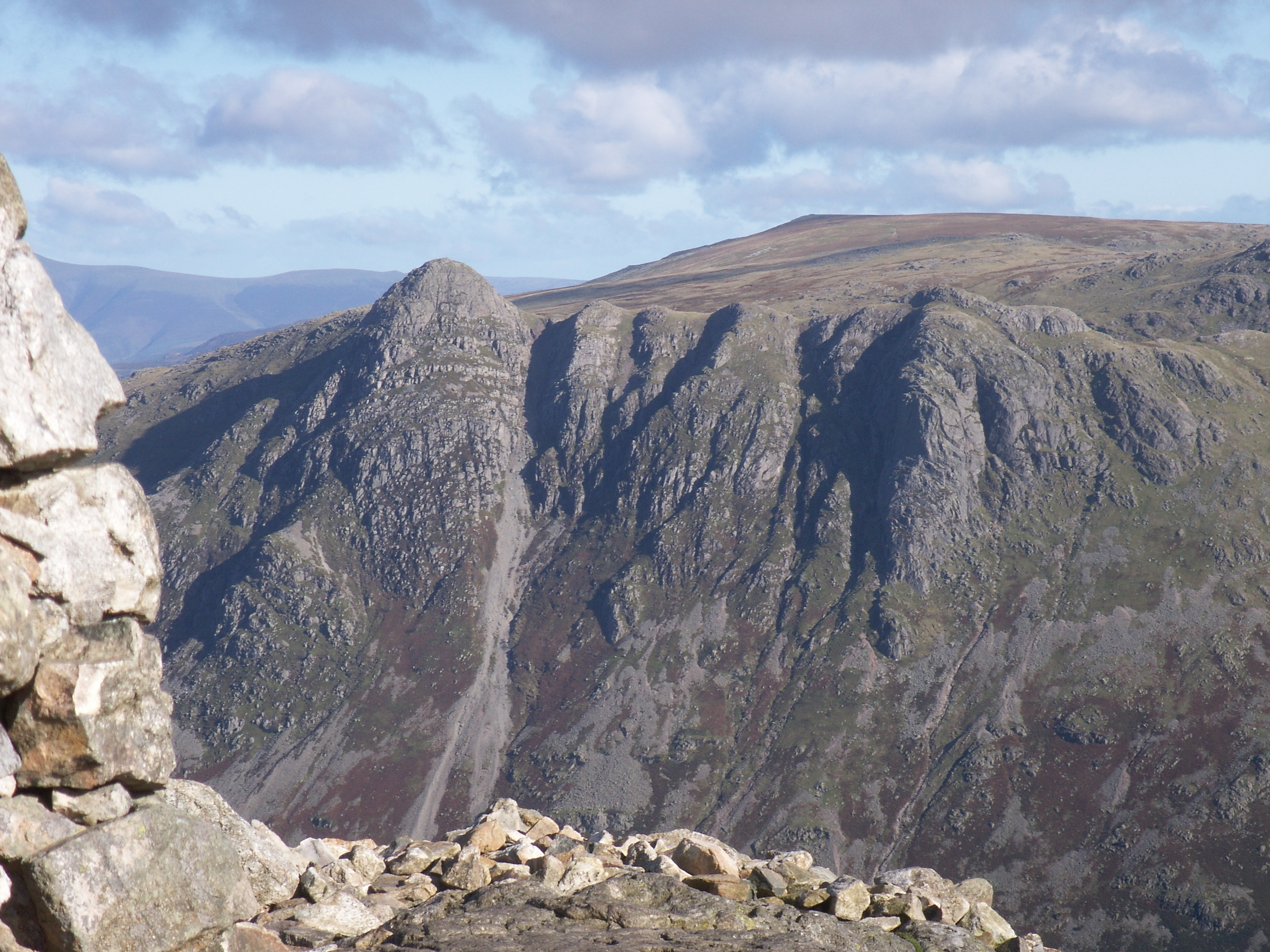
Pike of Stickle on the left, from the summit cairn of Pike of Blisco

== Geology ==
The rearward slopes show evidence of the Pavey Ark Member, pebbly sandstone and breccia. The Langdale face displays several strata: from the top The Lingmell Formation, Crinkle Member and Bad Step Tuff. These are composed, respectively, of tuff, lapilli tuff and breccia; rhyolitic tuff and breccia; and rhyolitic lava-like tuff.

== Summit ==
Despite the peaked profile the summit is wide enough for a sizeable cairn surrounded by a small level area. Loft Crag and Gimmer Crag steal the attention in the foreground while Bowfell impresses across Langdale. A wide swathe of the Southern Fells is in view, whilst even distant Skiddaw puts in an appearance.

== Ascents ==
Pike of Stickle rises steeply from Langdale, culminating in a narrow tapering summit which gives excellent views of the head of the valley, the fells of Bow Fell and Crinkle Crags showing well. The fell is usually climbed from Great Langdale with either the New or Old Dungeon Ghyll Hotels as the starting points. There are a number of routes, the most common ascent being a path that slants across the hillside from the New hotel passing between Thorn Crag and Gimmer Crag and then turning left at the col. A quieter route is by Troughton Beck; the walker starts from the Old hotel and goes four kilometres (2 1/2 miles) towards the head of the valley before bearing right and following a zigzag path at the side of Troughton Beck. This route gives the walker an unusual view of the fell from this unfrequented side. There is another route directly up the Stickle Stone Shoot: this route is steep and has become severely eroded in recent years and is no longer recommended as a means of ascent or descent. The Langdale or Borrowdale sides of Stake Pass can also be used, giving access onto Martcrag Moor.

== Stone axe factory ==
Pike of Stickle is the site of one of the most important neolithic stone axe factories in Europe. The most prominent quarries are situated above the scree slopes on the steep southern face of the fell. The factory was set up here because of a vein of greenstone, a very hard volcanic rock, which comes to the surface around the head of the valley. Evidence of axe manufacture have been found in many areas of Great Langdale but it is the screes of Pike of Stickle which have yielded the most discoveries. There is a small cave at the top of the Stickle Stone Shoot near the summit of the fell which was part of the stone axe factory.
