= Harrison Stickle =

Mountain in the English Lake District, Cumbria, England

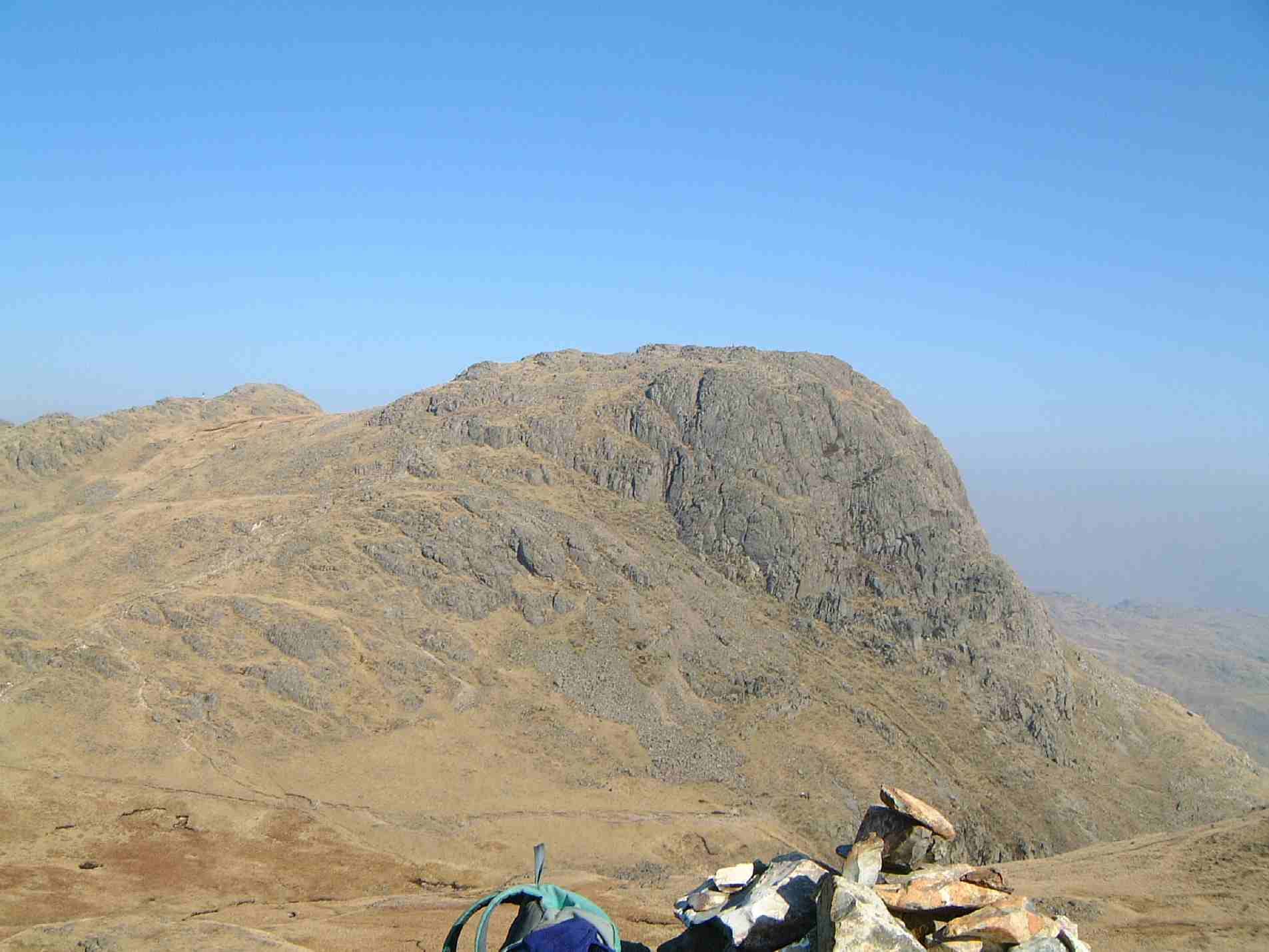
- Harrison Stickle seen from Loft Crag

Highest point
- Elevation: 736 m (2,415 ft)
- Prominence: c. 53 m
- Parent peak: High Raise
- Listing: Hewitt, Wainwright, Nuttall
- Coordinates: 54°27′25″N 3°06′38″W

Geography
- Location within the Lake District
- Location: Cumbria, England
- Parent range: Lake District, Central Fells
- OS grid: NY281074
- Topo map: OS Explorer OL6

Harrison Stickle is a fell in the central part of the English Lake District, situated above Great Langdale. The fell is one of the three (although the number is debated) fells which make up the picturesque Langdale Pikes, the others being Pike of Stickle and Loft Crag. Together they make up one of the most picturesque, and probably the best-known, mountain groups in the District. A "stickle" is a hill with a prominent rocky top.

== Topography ==
The Langdale Pikes form a raised rocky parapet around the southern and eastern edges of a high tableland centred upon Thunacar Knott. Harrison Stickle is the high point of this system and its crags fall south and east from the summit, presenting an arresting view from the valley floor 2,000 feet (610 m) below, or from further afield.

To the north, the main ridge of the central fells passes over Thunacar Knott before climbing to High Raise. The craggy eastern face of this ridge continues north as far as Harrison's near neighbour, Pavey Ark, visually the most impressive face in the area. The south-western border of Harrison Stickle is formed by the deep ravine of Dungeon Ghyll, which cuts through the parapet of the Langdale Pikes and into the lower hinterland of Harrison Combe. Across the Ghyll westwards are Thorn Crag, Loft Crag and finally Pike of Stickle. Below the steep eastern face of Harrison Stickle lie Stickle Tarn and its ghyll, thus ensuring that all drainage from the fell is to Great Langdale. The tarn is a waterfilled corrie about 50 feet (15 m) deep, this being enhanced by a dam. The water is used for public consumption in Great Langdale.

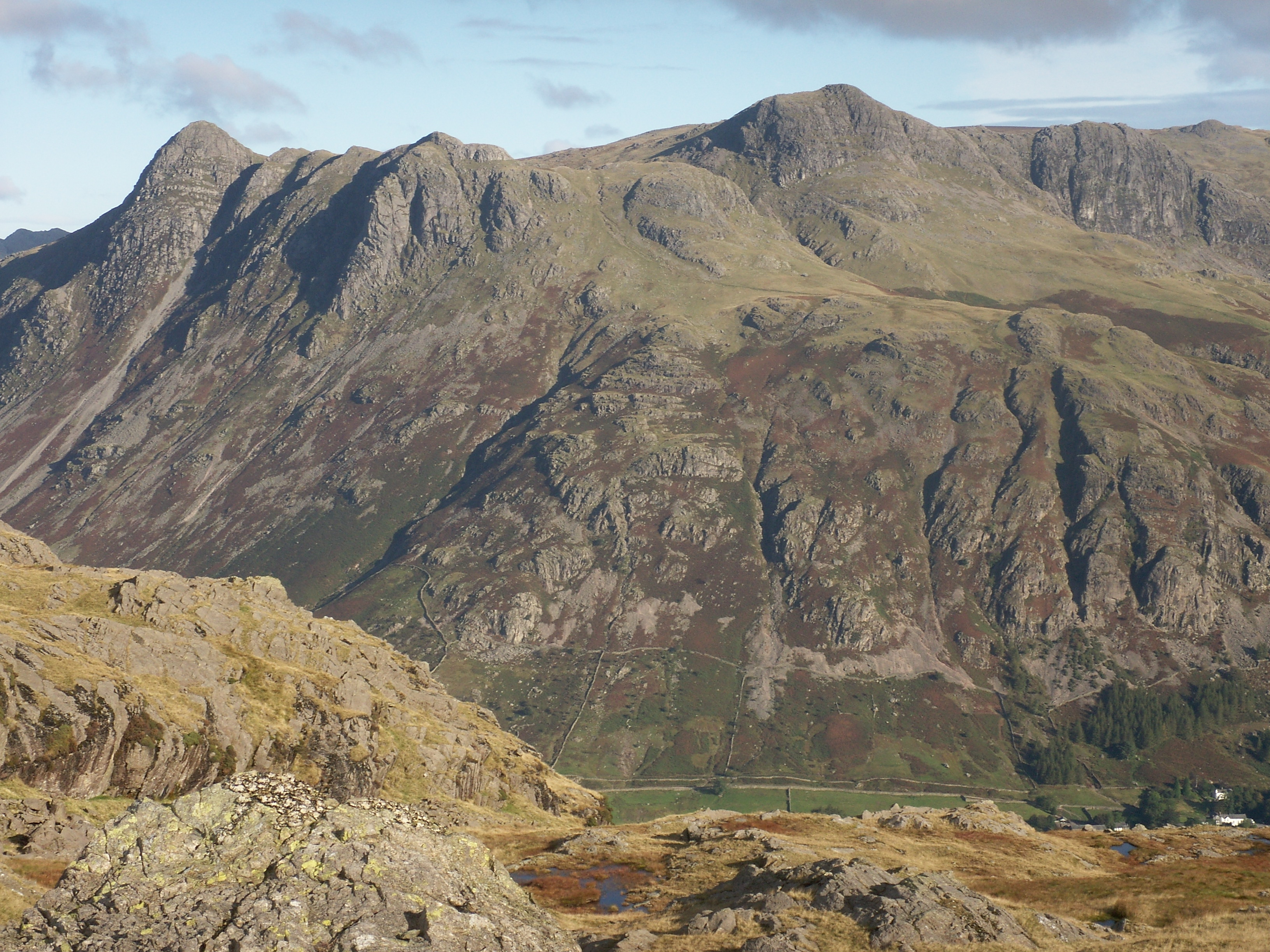
Harrison Stickle, the highest of the Langdale Pikes, in the centre of the group

== Geology and archaeology ==
Harrison Stickle's summit area is composed of the pebbly sandstone and breccia of the Pavey Ark Member.

Several greenstone knapping sites have been found below the main peak, and following the strike of the tuff exploited at nearby Pike O'Stickle in the Neolithic period. The sites on Pike O'Stickle have been well described as the Langdale axe industry, but they have been found to be much more widespread than originally thought. The rock was roughly shaped on site, and then traded across the country, where the final polishing could be undertaken. Such polished axes have been found in Buckinghamshire for example as well as in East Anglia. The axes varied widely in size, shape and function, and most were designed to be fitted with either wooden or bone handles (using pointed butt ends or narrow waists).

== Summit ==
The summit is a short rocky ridge with a cairn at each end, the northern one being higher. The view from Harrison Stickle is as good as the view of it — a surprisingly rare occurrence — with all of the major fell groups visible.

== Ascents ==
The fell is usually climbed from New Dungeon Ghyll Hotel in Great Langdale, and there are a number of possible routes up. The simplest first follows Stickle Beck to Stickle Tarn; a path then leads up the western side of Pavey Ark to reach the summit. The fell is almost invariably combined with other nearby peaks to make a longer circular walk.
