= Pavey Ark =

Mountain in the English Lake District, Cumbria, England

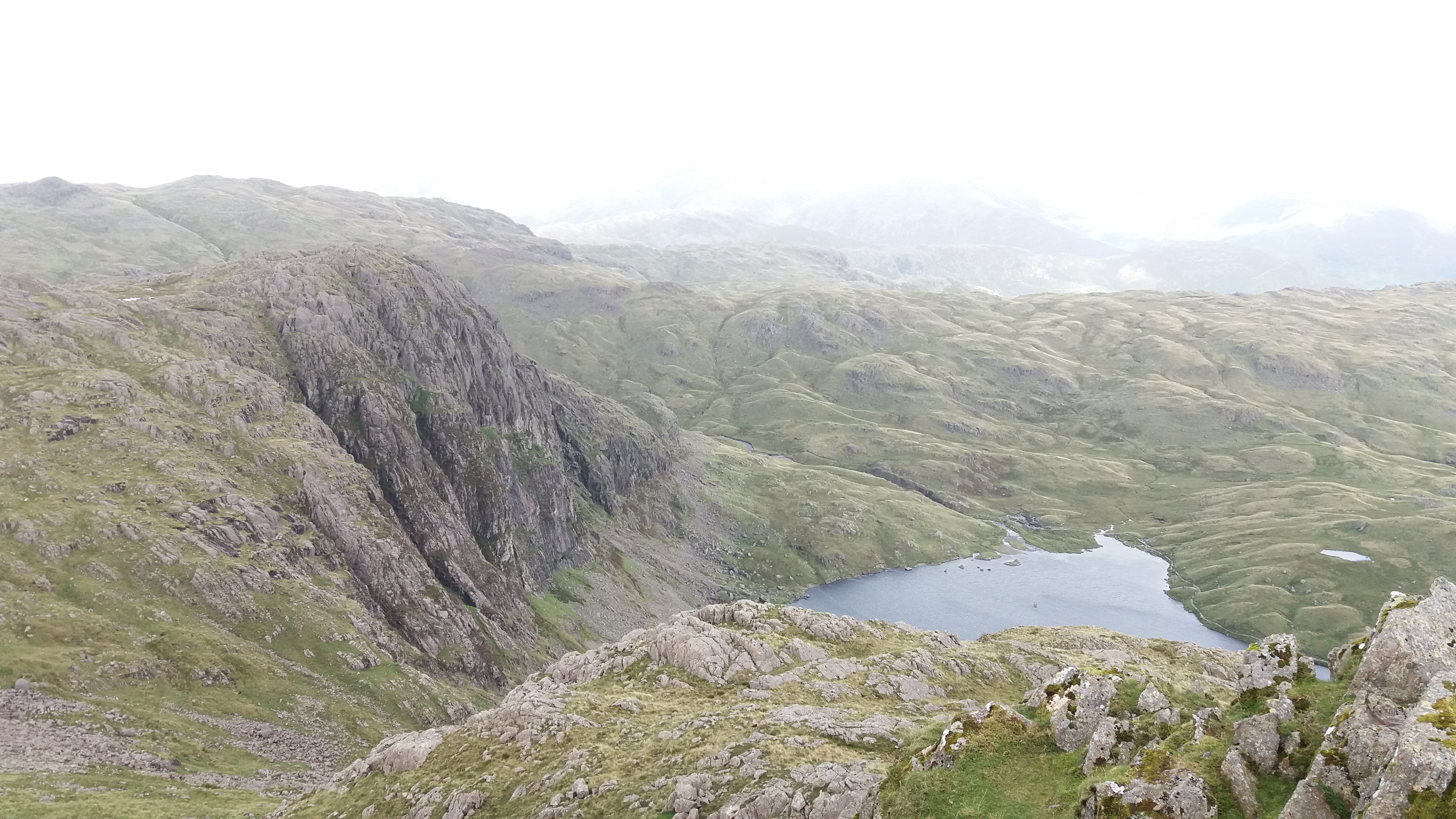
- Pavey Ark, centre left, and Stickle Tarn

Highest point
- Elevation: 700 m (2,300 ft)
- Prominence: c.15 m
- Parent peak: Thunacar Knott
- Listing: Wainwright, Nuttall
- Coordinates: 54°27′41″N 3°06′16″W

Geography
- Location within the Lake District
- Location: Cumbria, England
- Parent range: Lake District, Central Fells
- OS grid: NY285079
- Topo map: OS Explorer OL6

Pavey Ark is a fell in the English county of Cumbria. It is one of the Langdale Pikes, lying to the north of Great Langdale, in the heart of the Lake District, immediately to the north-east of Harrison Stickle.

== Topography ==
From the shores of Stickle Tarn, Pavey Ark gives the impression of being a rocky ridge. In fact this is misleading, and the north-western side is simply an undulating area of moorland, rising towards Thunacar Knott. The summit plateau is characterised by tarns, rocky outcrops and bilberry terraces.

Pavey Ark is the largest cliff in the Langdales, but faces east over Stickle Tarn and is less prominent from the floor of Great Langdale away to the south. The main face is a little over 1/4 mile (400 metres) across and drops about 400 feet (120 metres). To the southwest it merges into the crags of Harrison Stickle, while the northern end peters out into the valley of Bright Beck. Stickle Tarn is wholly within the territory of the Ark, a corrie tarn which has been dammed to create additional capacity. The stone-faced barrage is low enough not to spoil the character of the pool, and the water is used for public consumption in the hotels and homes below. The tarn has a depth of around 50 feet (15 metres).

== Geology ==
The face is an outcrop of the formation named for the fell, the Pavey Ark Member. This consists of pebbly sandstone and breccia and is set within the Seathwaite Fell Formation of volcaniclastic sandstone with interbeds of tuff, lapilli tuff, breccia and conglomerate.

== Ascents ==
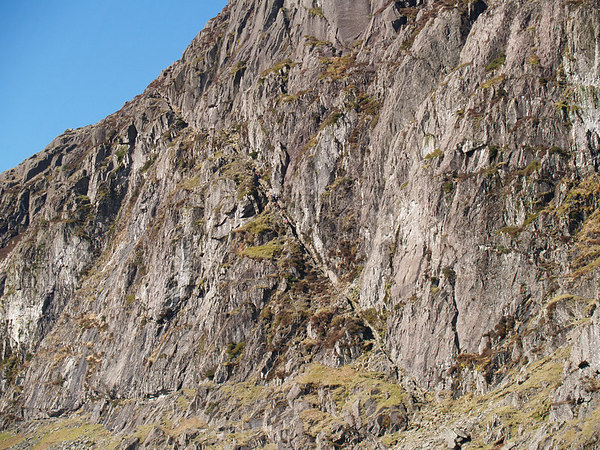
Looking at Jack's Rake from Stickle Tarn. Walkers can be seen ascending the rake.

Pavey Ark is most often climbed from the New Dungeon Ghyll Hotel, located some 1 1/4 miles (2 kilometres) south. The route follows Mill Gill up to Stickle Tarn, which can also be reached via a much less popular and more strenuous path following the Dungeon Ghyll ravines. From Stickle Tarn there is a choice of routes; one of the most popular is to follow a diagonal slit on Pavey Ark's craggy south-eastern face. This route is known as Jack's Rake, and requires scrambling. Alternative, easier, ascents are available on either side of the main crag.

Jack's Rake is the most famous ascent of the Pavey Ark precipice. It is classified as a Grade 1 scramble, but it is within the capability of many walkers, though it does require a head for heights and is considerably harder in bad weather. The rake starts beneath the East Buttress at the precipice's eastern end, near a large cairn (with a tablet marked 'JWS 1900') immediately north of Stickle Tarn, and then climbs west across the face of the crag. The rake follows a natural groove in the precipice face and is clearly indicated by several Ash trees. Wainwright wrote that for fellwalkers Jack's Rake is "difficult and awkward", although there is "curiously little sense of exposure, for a comforting parapet of rock accompanies all the steeper parts of the ascent". The summit is a short walk from the top exit of the rake, which is also used as a descent route by rock climbers accessing the climbs on the cliff face.

In two separate incidents, two walkers fell to their deaths from Jack's Rake in June 2012.

As with Lord's Rake on Scafell Crag, the word 'rake' refers to a path across major precipices, originally used by climbers for access to rock climbs, but which can also be used by walkers.

Pavey Ark can also be ascended from Stickle Tarn via Easy Gully, North Rake or by the path to Harrison Stickle. Easy Gully is a steep walk on scree between the crags at the eastern end of the precipice, starting from the same place as Jack's Rake, and is blocked by large boulders near the top, where tough scrambling is required. North Rake (so named by Wainwright) starts from the path to High Raise at the very eastern end of the cliff and rises west over the top of the East Buttress. This is a much less exposed and strenuous walking route to the summit.

== Summit ==
There is no cairn on the bare rock of the summit, set back a few yards from the edge and a little to the north of the exit from Jack's Rake. The view north-west is perhaps spoilt by the long slopes of High Raise, but the Eastern and Southern Fells are well seen

== Rock climbing ==
The Pavey Ark crag is split by several large gullies and chimneys: Little Gully, Great Gully, Crescent Gully, Gwynne's Chimney, and Rake End Chimney. Other rock climbs include Crescent Slabs, Arcturus, Cruel Sister, Mother Courage, Sixpence, and Impact Day (E8 6c), and Lexicon (E11 7a).

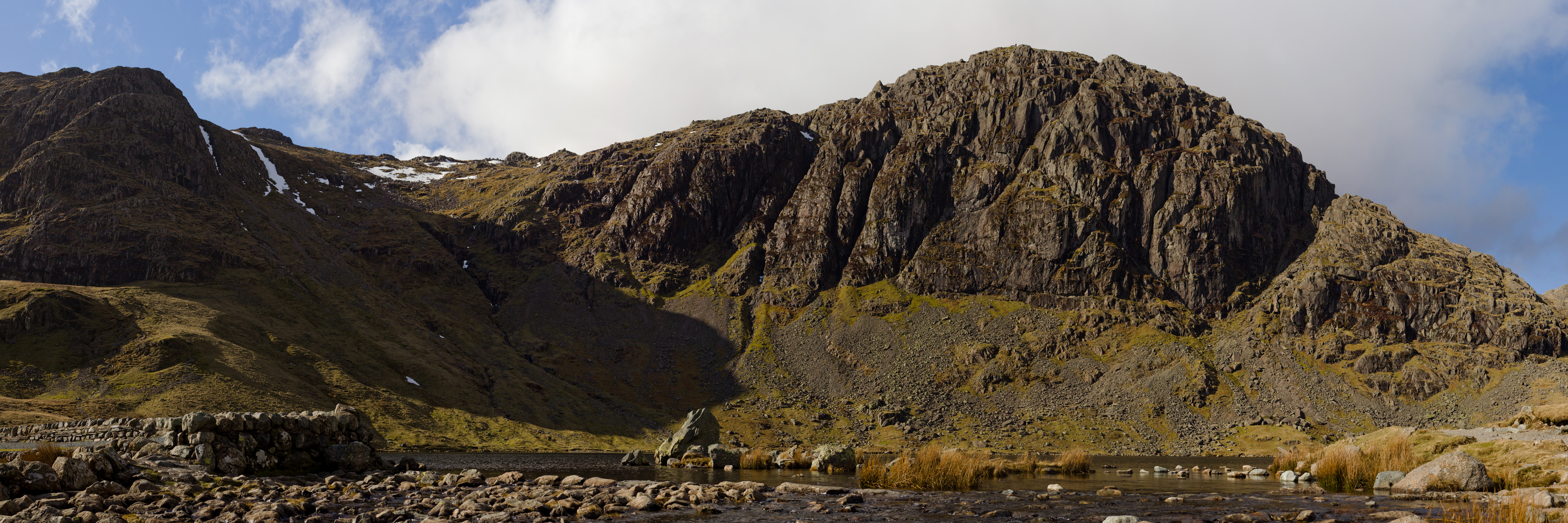
A panoramic image of Pavey Ark. Jack's Rake can be traced from the lower right to the upper left. Two pairs of rock climbers can be seen ascending a more challenging route, and a pair of walkers stand at the summit. To the left is Harrison Stickle, and the winding path back down to the tarn.
