= Fix the Fells =

Charity protecting footpaths in England

- Formation: 2001
- Type: Charitable organisation
- Region served: Lake District of England
- Programme Manager: Isabel Berry
- Staff: 26
- Volunteers: 110
- Website: www.fixthefells.co.uk

Fix the Fells is a conservation programme established as a partnership between the Lake District National Park, the National Trust, Natural England, the Lake District Foundation, Friends of the Lake District, and Cumbria County Council. It undertakes work to combat footpath erosion in the English Lake District, which has been a UNESCO World Heritage Site since 2017.

The organisation was founded on 18 August 2001 with funding from the Heritage Lottery Fund, with the aim of protecting the landscape and wildlife of the Lake District mountains. Over the following two decades it spent almost £10 million on repairing damaged paths and eroded fell landscapes, including areas designated as Special Areas of Conservation and Sites of Special Scientific Interest. It has also received financial support from the Rural Payments Agency and the European Regional Development Fund. Fix the Fells repairs and maintains 344 upland paths, covering 410 miles (660 km).

From 2001 repair work was carried out by rangers from the National Trust and the Lake District National Park, working with local contractors. A volunteer scheme was launched in 2007 to support four ranger teams, and the programme now includes more than 100 volunteer 'lengthsmen', a medieval term for workers responsible for maintaining roads and ditches across a parish.

Fix the Fells was featured on the BBC programme The Lakes with Simon Reeve on 21 November 2021.

In 2022 Fix the Fells won the Park Protector Award from the Campaign for National Parks.

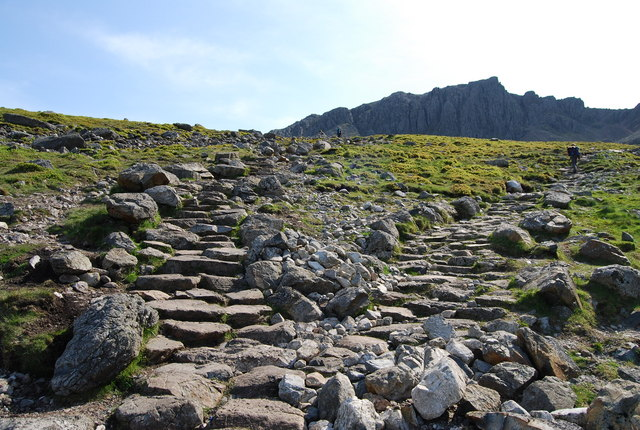
Footpaths to Scafell Pike
