= Great Langdale =

Valley in Cumbria, England

Coordinates: 54°26′38″N 3°05′02″W

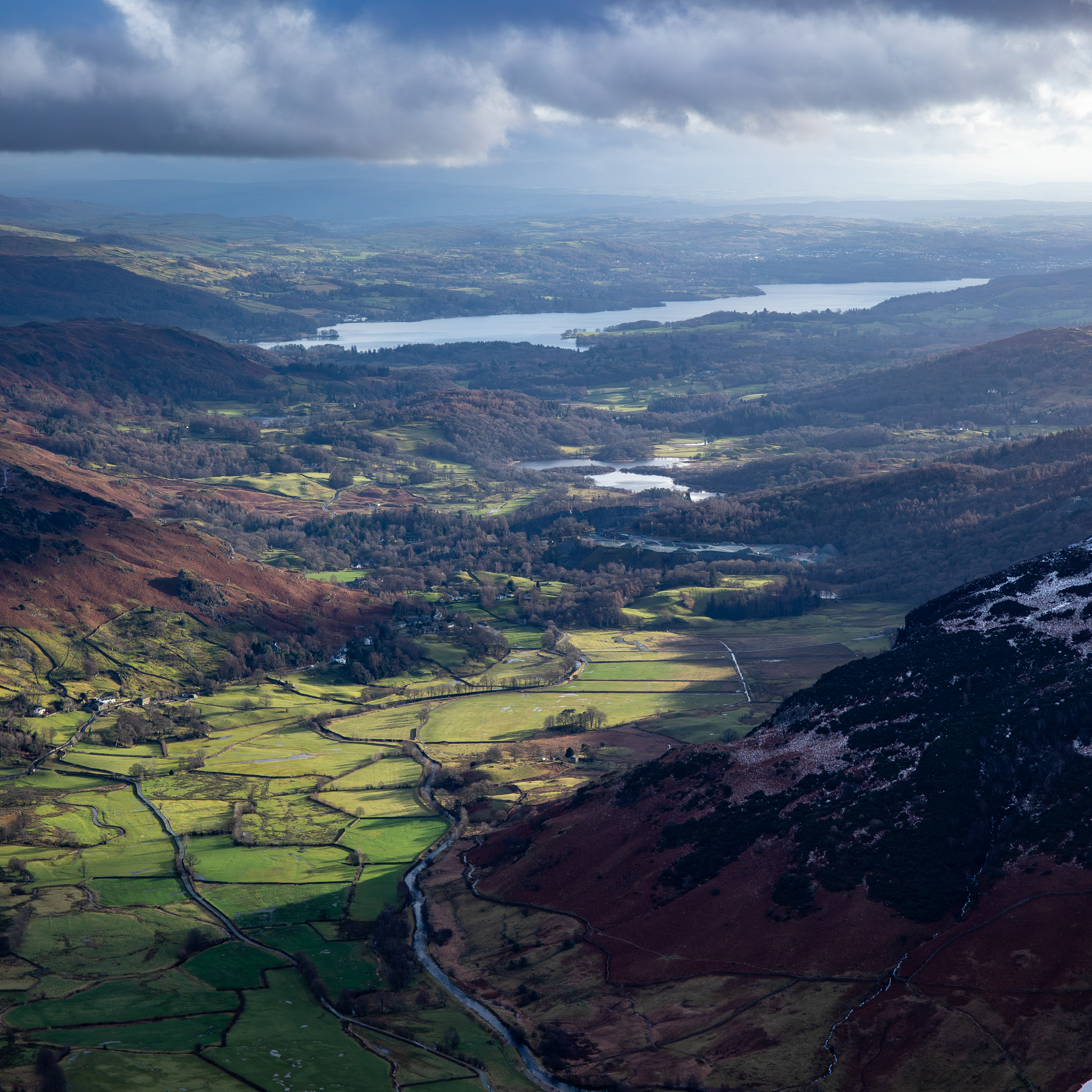

- Location in South Lakeland, Cumbria Location within Cumbria
- Population: 317 (2025)
- OS grid reference: NY 30343 06520
- Civil parish: Great Langdale
- Unitary authority: Westmorland
- Ceremonial county: Cumbria
- Region: North West
- Country: England
- Sovereign state: United Kingdom
- Post town: Keswick
- Postcode district: LA22
- Police: Cumbria
- Fire: Cumbria
- Ambulance: North West
- UK Parliament: Westmorland and Lonsdale

Great Langdale is a valley in the Lake District National Park in North West England, the epithet "Great" distinguishing it from the neighbouring valley of Little Langdale. Langdale is also the name of a valley in the Howgill Fells, elsewhere in Cumbria. The name is likely Norse, translating to "Long Valley".

It is a popular location for hikers, climbers, fell-runners and other outdoor enthusiasts who are attracted by the many fells ringing the head of the valley. Among the best-known features of Great Langdale are the Langdale Pikes, a group of peaks on the northern side of the dale. England's highest mountain, Scafell Pike, can be climbed by a route from Langdale. Langdale has views of, in particular, Dungeon Ghyll Force waterfall, Harrison Stickle and Pike of Stickle.

Great Langdale was an important site during the Neolithic period for producing stone axes and, later, was also one of the centres of the Lakeland slate industry.

== Pre-history ==
Great Langdale had a productive stone axe industry during the Neolithic period. The area has outcrops of fine-grained greenstone suitable for making polished axes which have been found distributed across the British Isles. The rock is an epidotised greenstone quarried, or perhaps just collected, from the scree slopes in the Langdale Valley on Harrison Stickle and Pike of Stickle.

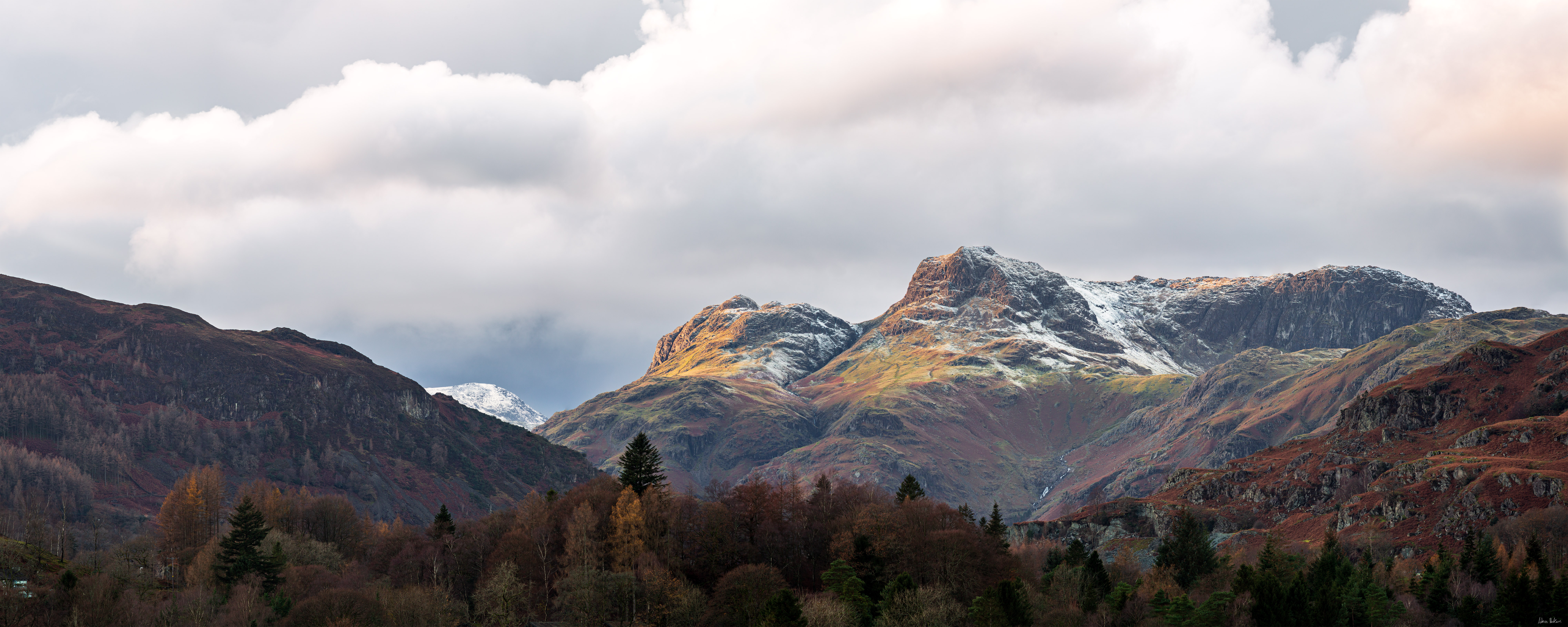
The Langdale Pikes in Winter

Great Langdale is known to archaeologists as the source of a particular type of Neolithic polished stone axe head - or "Group VI axes" - whose stone was collected on the slopes of the Pike of Stickle and traded all over prehistoric Great Britain and Europe. These axes have been found as far south as the River Thames and Cornwall, and as far north as Orkney, but are particularly prevalent in East Riding and the Rudston Landscape.

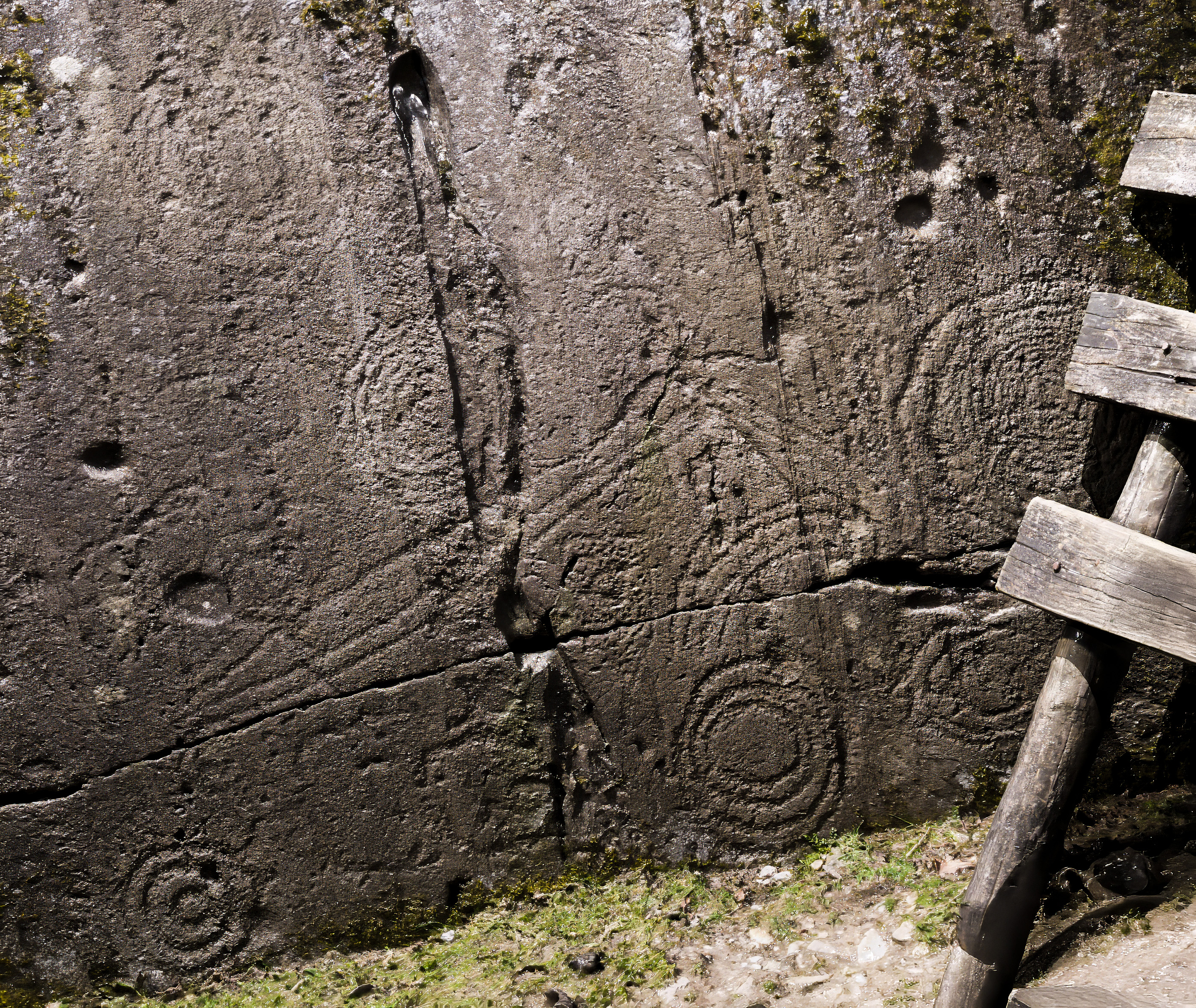
The Neolithic carvings on the Langdale Boulders (Copt Howe)

The Langdale Boulders at Copt Howe preserve England’s largest and most complex assemblage of Neolithic rock carvings, dated to c. 3300–2900 BC and rediscovered in 1999, consisting of incised linear and ring-like motifs. Stylistically, the carvings show strong affinities with Irish passage tomb art - such as that at Newgrange - suggesting long-distance cultural connections into Great Langdale, facilitated by Neolithic exchange networks. Although later quarrying damaged part of the boulders, the site remains significant as evidence of ceremonial activity and as part of a broader regional transition in the later Neolithic, when the decline of the Langdale axe industry coincided with the emergence of large megalithic monuments across Cumbria, possibly reflecting wider Irish Sea cultural influences.

Taken together, evidence positions Great Langdale as a central node in Early Neolithic Britain: a place of production, exchange, and likely ritual significance. Its influence may have extended well beyond Northern England, contributing materially and symbolically to the emergence of Neolithic monument traditions across the region - particularly the Stone Circle and Henge.

== Geography ==
The mouth of the valley is located at Skelwith Bridge, which lies about two miles (three kilometres) west of Ambleside. The Langdale valley contains two villages, Chapel Stile and Elterwater, and a hamlet at High Close. Great Langdale is a U-shaped valley formed by glaciers, while Little Langdale is a hanging valley.

== Slate industry ==
Great Langdale and Elterwater were centres of the Lakeland slate industry. Two slate workings, Elterwater Quarry and Spout Cragg Quarry, have been more or less continually working using modern methods. Elterwater is the larger of the two, and like Spout Cragg, is operated by the Burlington Stone Company. There are various other local quarries now fallen into disuse, such as Lingmoor, Banks, Thrang Crag and Colt Howe.

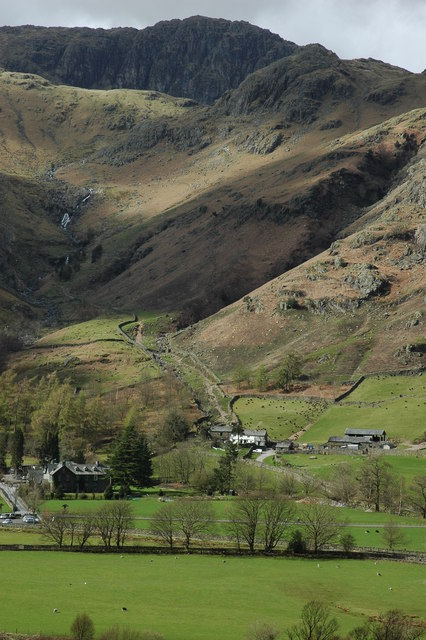
Pavey Ark from the valley floor.

== The Langdale Pikes ==
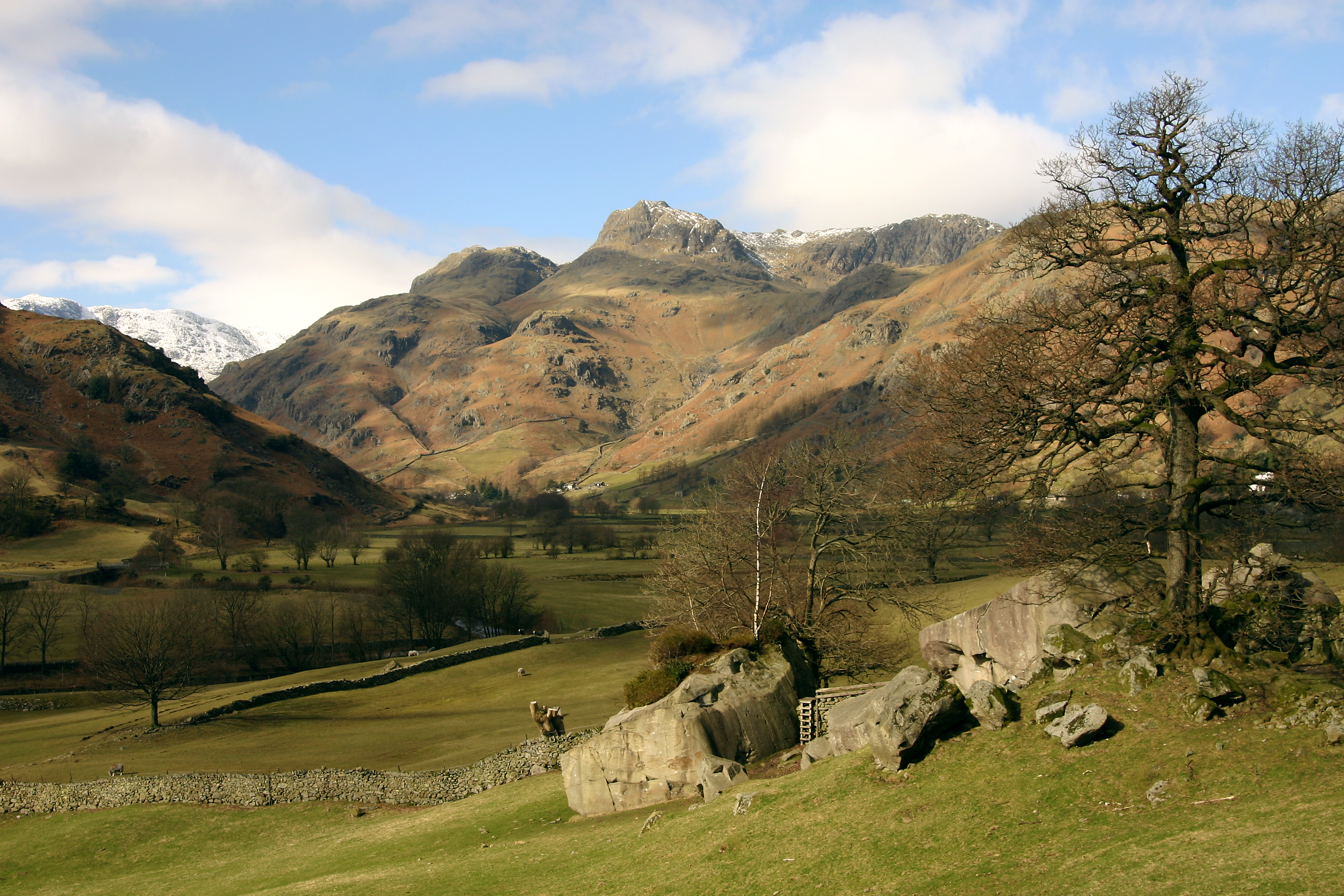
The Langdale Pikes and the Langdale Boulders, Great Langdale.

Among the best-known features of Great Langdale are the Langdale Pikes, a group of peaks on the northern side of the dale. From below, they appear as a sharp rocky ridge, though they are precipitous only on their southern side; to the north, the land sweeps gently to High Raise, the parent peak of the range. The Pikes themselves include (from west to east) Pike of Stickle, Loft Crag, Harrison Stickle and Pavey Ark.

=== Pike of Stickle ===
Pike of Stickle, also known as Pike o’ Stickle, reaches a height of 709 metres (2,326 ft). The rearward slopes show evidence of the Pavey Ark Member, pebbly sandstone and breccia. The Langdale face displays several strata: from the top the Lingmell Formation, Crinkle Member and Bad Step Tuff. These are composed, respectively, of tuff, lapilli tuff and breccia; rhyolitic tuff and breccia; and rhyolitic lava-like tuff. The altitude places Loft Crag and Gimmer Crag within sightlines to east-southeast while Bowfell is three kilometres (two miles) west-southwest. The Southern Fells and Skiddaw are also potentially visible.

=== Loft Crag ===
Loft Crag has a summit elevation of 2,238 feet (682 metres). It lies between Harrison Stickle and Pike of Stickle. The fell has a small sharp summit, below which rises Gimmer Crag, which is one of the top rock climbing venues in the Lake District. The crag is made of Rhyolite rock and was pioneered in the early 1880s by Walter Parry Haskett Smith.

=== Harrison Stickle ===
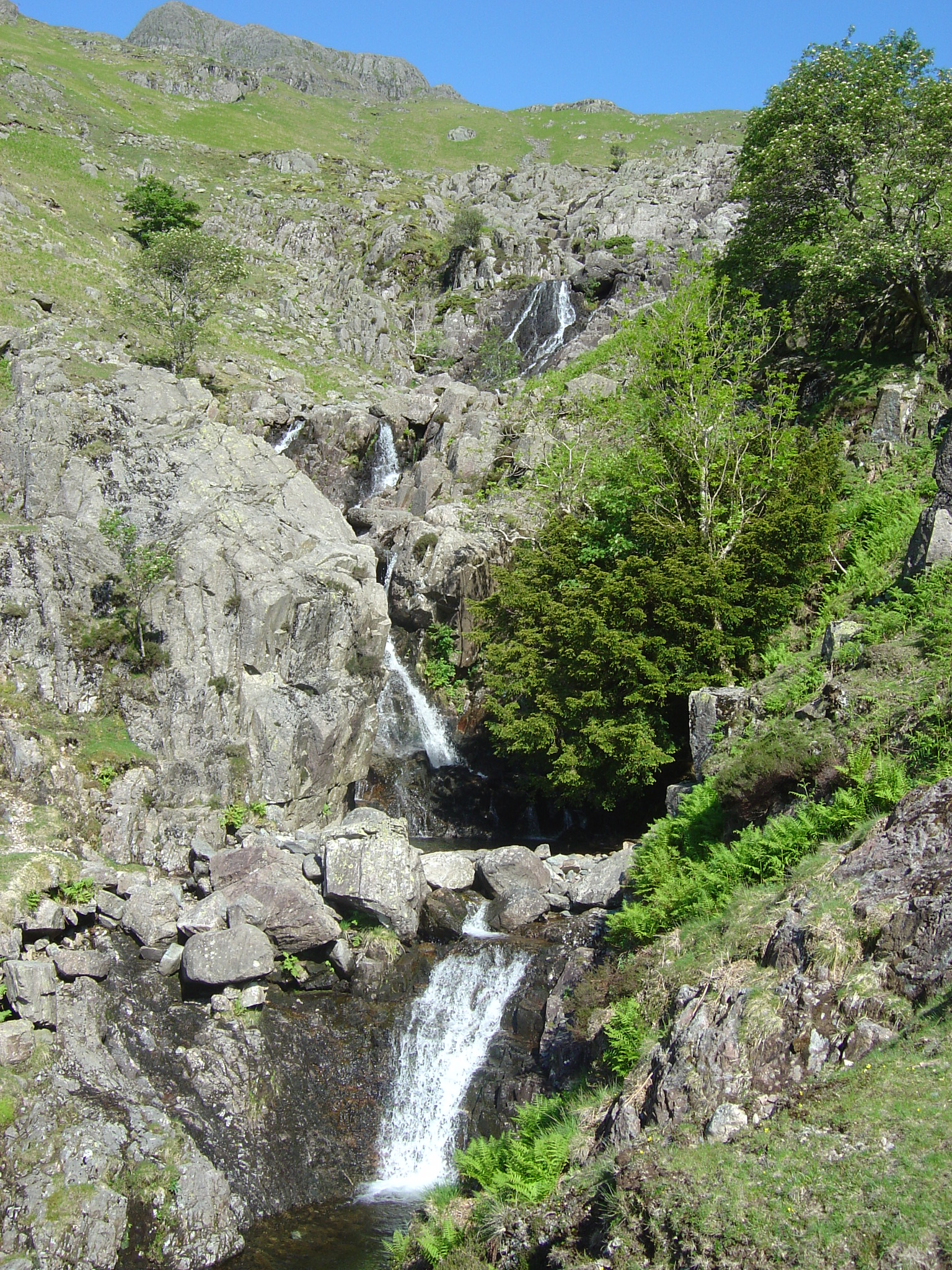
A waterfall in Stickle Ghyll

Harrison Stickle is the high point of the Langdale Pikes, and its crags fall south and east from the summit, presenting a view from the valley floor 2,000 feet (610 metres) below, or from further afield. To the north, the main ridge of the central fells passes over Thunacar Knott before climbing to High Raise. The craggy eastern face of this ridge continues north as far as Harrison's near neighbour, Pavey Ark. The southwestern border of Harrison Stickle is formed by the deep ravine of Dungeon Ghyll, which cuts through the parapet of the Langdale Pikes and into the lower hinterland of Harrison Combe. Across the Ghyll westwards are Thorn Crag, Loft Crag, and finally Pike of Stickle. Below the steep eastern face of Harrison Stickle lie Stickle Tarn and its Ghyll, thus ensuring that all drainage from the fell is to Great Langdale. The tarn is a water-filled corrie about 50 feet (15 metres) deep, this being enhanced by a dam. The water is used for public consumption in Great Langdale.

=== Pavey Ark ===
Pavey Ark is 700 metres (2,297 feet) high. The main face is a little over 1/4 mile (400 metres) across and drops about 400 feet (120 metres). To the southwest, it merges into the crags of Harrison Stickle, while the northern end peters out into the valley of Bright Beck. Stickle Tarn is wholly within the territory of the Ark, a corrie tarn which has been dammed to create additional capacity. The stone-faced barrage is low enough not to spoil the character of the pool, and the water is used for public consumption in the hotels and homes below. The tarn has a depth of around 50 feet (15 metres).

== Other fells ==
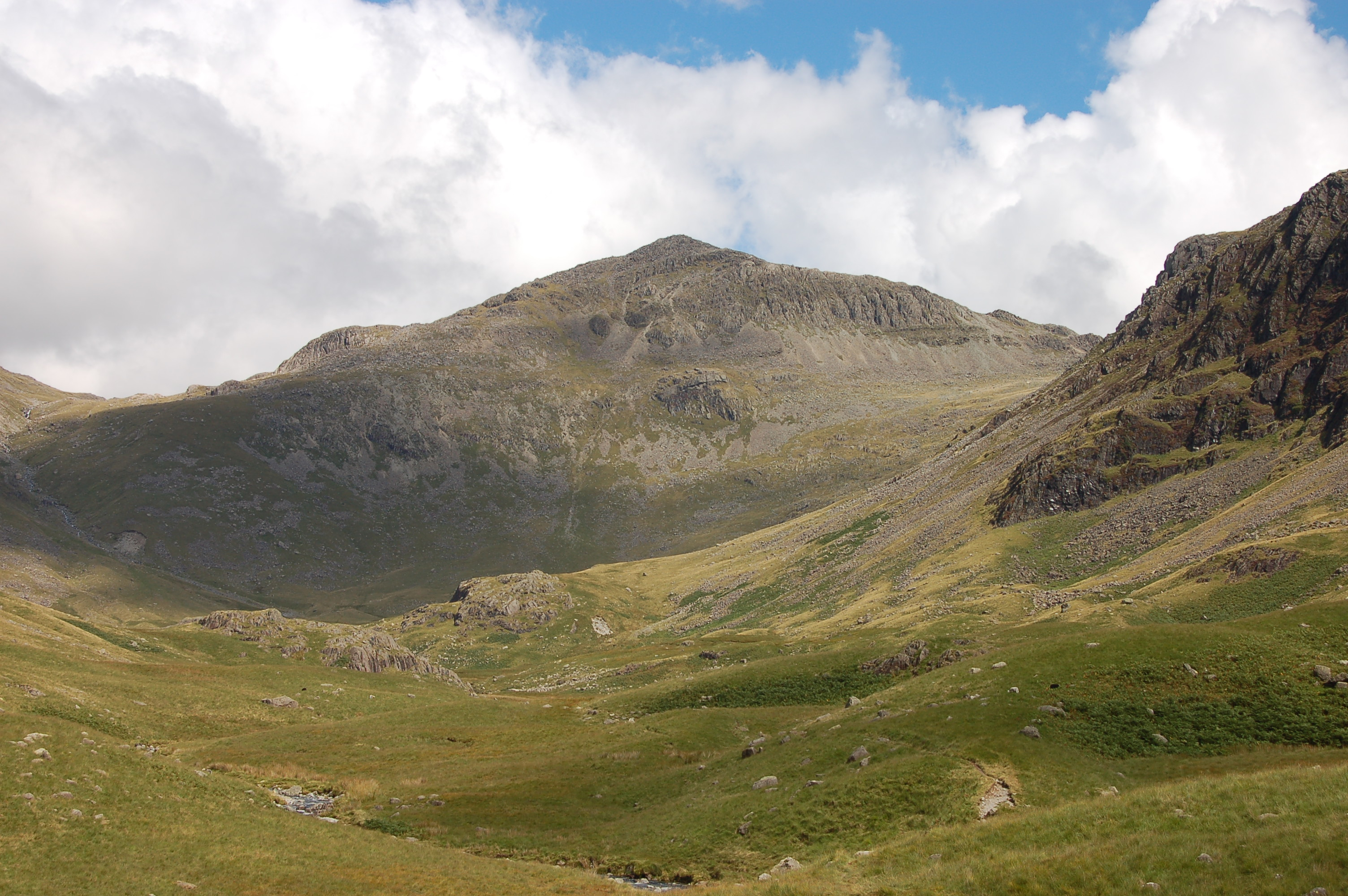
Bowfell

Great Langdale's highest fell is Bowfell. Other notable Langdale fells are Crinkle Crags, at the head of the Oxendale valley, and Pike o' Blisco on the southern side of the valley.

== Dungeon Ghyll ==
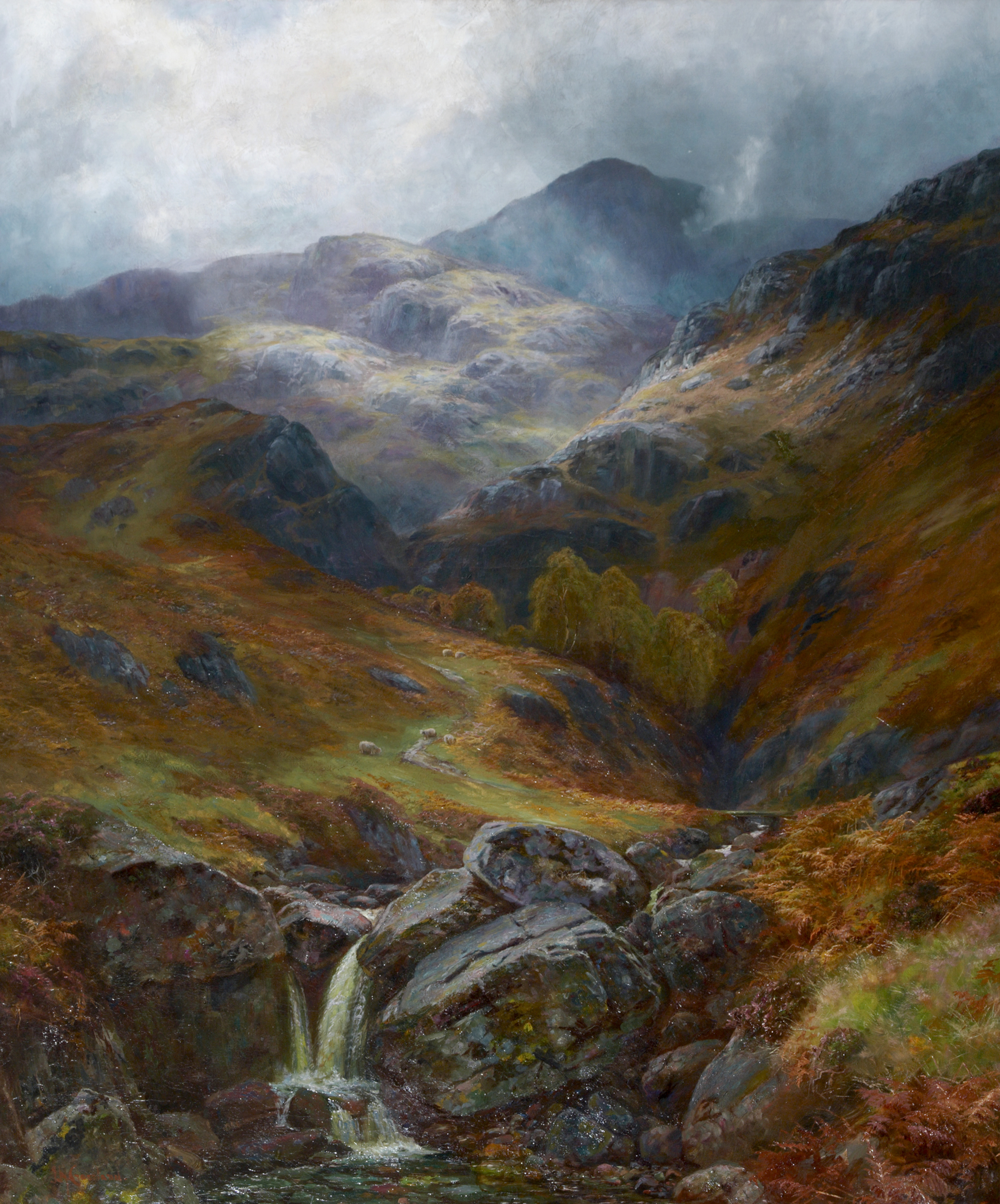
Dungeon Ghyll by James Henry Crossland (1852–1939)

Dungeon Ghyll is a ravine on the north side of the valley, starting on the fell slopes between Harrison Stickle and Loft Crag/Pike of Stickle. It is narrow, and a No Through Route for walkers. Much more open is Stickle Ghyll, which descends from Stickle Tarn. There is a well–trodden path from the Stickle Ghyll car park opposite the New Dungeon Ghyll hotel up to the tarn, parts of which have been improved with stone slabs to reduce erosion. Another waterfall, known as Dungeon Ghyll Force, is up a path behind the Old Dungeon Ghyll Hotel.

Middle Fell Bridge here is the bridge centring in the plot of the 1945 film Brief Encounter.

== Cultural reference ==
Letitia Elizabeth Landon's poetical illustration, Langdale Pikes (1832), to a picture by Thomas Allom, ignores the mountains and eulogises on the excellent trout fishing in the river.

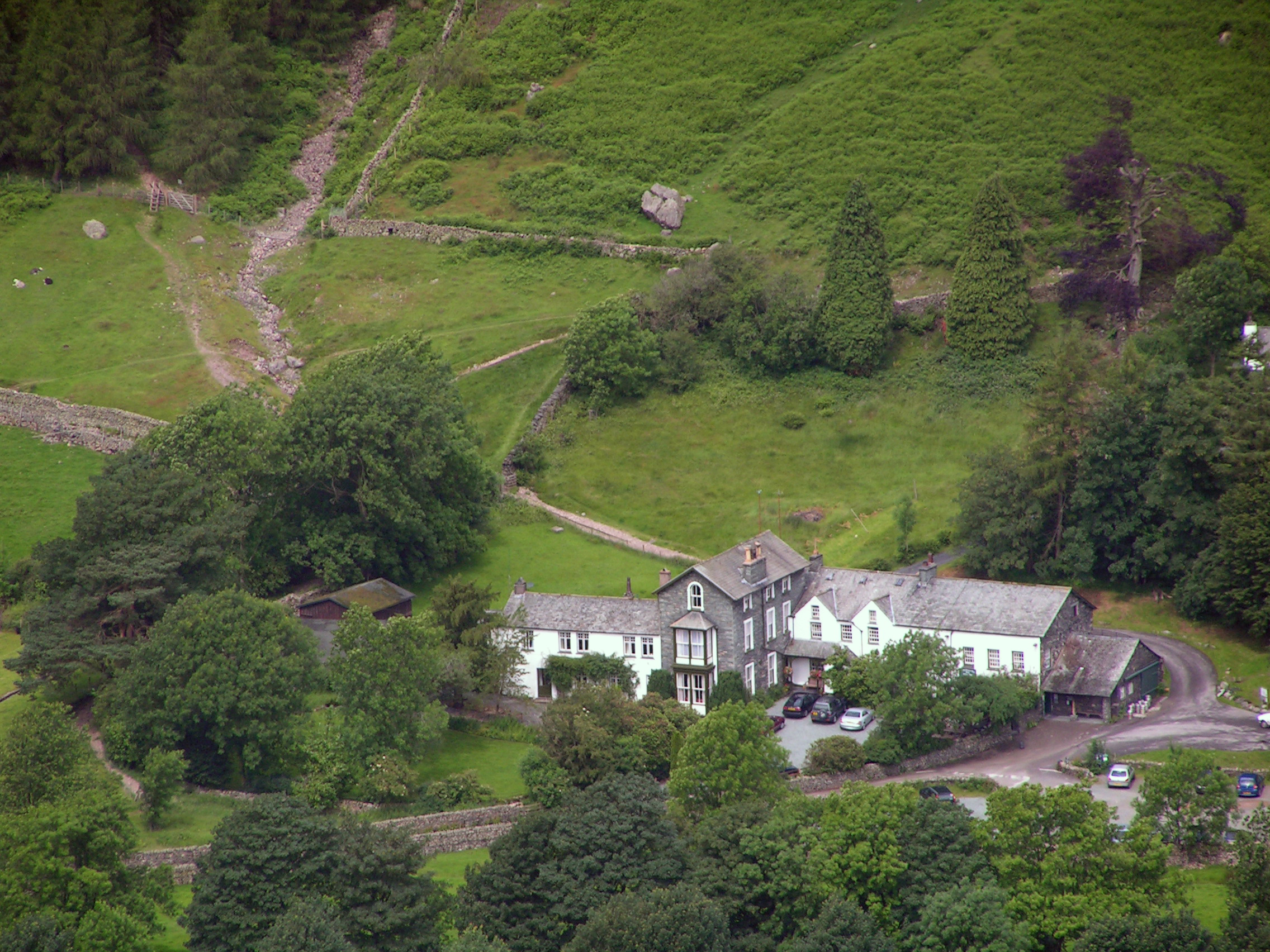
Old Dungeon Ghyll from Side Pike

== Tourism ==
There are several popular fell walking routes including Bowfell, Crinkle Crags, the Langdale Pikes and England's highest mountain, Scafell Pike. There are also rock-climbing spots on the valley floor, such as Raven Crag, Gimmer Crag, and White Ghyll, providing some of the most spectacular rock routes in the UK. The Langdale Leisure Limited company, consisting of a hotel, timeshare lodges and leisure facilities, operates in the valley.

=== Old Dungeon Ghyll ===
The Old Dungeon Ghyll Hotel was originally a farm and inn. It was bought by the historian Professor G. M. Trevelyan who donated it to the National Trust, and who was later buried in Holy Trinity Church in Chapel Stile. The hotel and the Hikers Bar have a long association with climbing and many famous climbers have stayed at the hotel or drunk in the bar. In climbing circles it is known as the "ODG". Further down the valley there is the New Dungeon Ghyll Hotel, built in 1862. Campsites in the area include the National Trust site near Dungeon Ghyll and the Baysbrown Farm campsite at Chapel Stile.
