= List of lakes of the Lake District =

This list contains the lakes, tarns and reservoirs in the Lake District National Park in Cumbria, England.

Only one body of water, Bassenthwaite Lake, is traditionally named a lake. Larger bodies of water in the Lake District are generally named as mere or water, whilst smaller ones are denoted by tarn. Some writers, particularly in the media, refer to Lake Windermere though this use is deprecated.

== Physical characteristics of the main lakes ==
This table gives details of those bodies of water with a surface area of at least 0.1 km².

Name	Length (km)	Max. width (km)	Area (km^{2})	Volume (million m^{3})	Mean depth (m)	Max. depth (m)	Surface elev. (m)	Retention time (days)	Trophic state index
Bassenthwaite Lake	6.2	1.1	5.3	27.7	5.3	19.0	68.0	30	eutrophic
Blea Water	0.55		0.17	0.51	3.1		488		
Blelham Tarn	0.67	0.29	0.11	0.7	6.8	14.5	42.0	50	eutrophic
Brotherswater	0.6	0.43	0.19	1.2	7.2	15.0	157.0	21	oligotrophic
Burnmoor Tarn	0.83		0.24	1.23	5.1	13.0	253		
Buttermere	2.0	0.54	0.9	15.1	16.6	28.6	100.3	140	oligotrophic/mesotrophic
Cogra Moss	0.68		0.16	0.84	5.4		225		
Coniston Water	8.7	0.73	4.9	113.4	24.1	56.1	43.6	340	mesotrophic/oligotrophic
Crummock Water	4.0	0.85	2.5	66.7	26.7	43.9	97.8	200	oligotrophic/mesotrophic
Derwent Water	4.6	1.91	5.4	29.1	5.5	22.0	75.0	55	mesotrophic
Devoke Water	1.17		0.34	1.89	5.5		236		
Easedale Tarn	0.5		0.10	0.53	5.1		282		
Elter Water	1.0	0.4	0.16	0.5	3.3	7.0	53.0	20	outer basin: mesotrophic middle basin: eutrophic inner basin: hypereutrophic
Ennerdale Water	3.8	1.1	3.0	53.5	17.8	42.0	112.2	200	oligotrophic/mesotrophic
Esthwaite Water	2.5	0.62	1.0	6.2	6.4	15.5	65.2	100	eutrophic/hypereutrophic
Grasmere	1.6	0.6	0.6	4.7	7.7	21.5	63.4	25	eutrophic
Grisedale Tarn	0.55		0.11	1.28	11.6	33.0	538		
Haweswater	6.9	0.9	3.9	88.8	23.4	57.0	246.0	500	mesotrophic
Hayeswater	0.9		0.16	0.30	1.9		426		
Kentmere Reservoir	0.7		0.16	0.78	5.0		297		
Levers Water	0.5		0.14	1.07	7.9		413		
Loweswater	1.8	0.55	0.6	5.0	8.4	16.0	125.0	150	mesotrophic
Over Water	0.73		0.20	0.45	2.3	10.0	188		
Rydal Water	1.2	0.36	0.3	1.6	4.4	18.0	53.0	9	eutrophic/mesotrophic
Seathwaite Tarn	1.15		0.24	1.33	5.5		374		
Tarn Hows	0.85		0.14	0.75	5.4		188		
Thirlmere	6.0	0.78	3.3	50.4	16.1	46.0	178.0	280	oligotrophic
Ullswater	11.8	1.02	8.9	219.7	25.3	63.0	145.0	350	oligotrophic/mesotrophic
Wastwater	4.8	0.82	2.9	110.4	40.2	76.0	61.0	350	oligotrophic
Wet Sleddale Reservoir	1.0		0.31	2.33	7.6		277		
Windermere	16.8	1.6	14.8	314.3	21.25	64.0	39.0		slightly eutrophic
Windermere (north)	7.0	1.6	8.1	202.1	25.1	64.0	39.0	180	slightly eutrophic
Windermere (south)	9.8	1.0	6.7	112.2	16.8	42.0	39.0	100	slightly eutrophic

== Map of major lakes ==
The map shows the locations of the lakes with a volume over 4 million m^{3} and gives an indication of the volume of water in each lake. The markers suggest this by showing the size of a drop of water where the volume of the drop would be in proportion to the quantity of water in the lake (the diameter of the drop is proportional to the cube root of the lake's volume).

Major lakes in the Lake District

== Lakes, tarns and reservoirs ==
- Alcock Tarn, east of Grasmere, below Heron Pike
- Angle Tarn, north of Bowfell
- Angle Tarn, east of Patterdale, by Angletarn Pikes
- Bassenthwaite Lake
- Beacon Tarn in the Blawith fells, west of Coniston Water
- Bigland Tarn near Haverthwaite
- Blackbeck Tarn on Haystacks
- Bleaberry Tarn, north of Red Pike, near Buttermere
- Blea Tarn, near Boot, Eskdale
- Blea Tarn, between Pike of Blisco and Lingmoor Fell
- Blea Tarn, on Watendlath fell, north of Ullscarf
- Blea Water, below High Street
- Blelham Tarn, west of Windermere
- Blind Tarn, on the east side of the ridge south of Dow Crag
- Boretree Tarn, west of the southern end of Windermere
- Bowscale Tarn, on the slopes of Bowscale Fell
- Brothers Water
- Burnmoor Tarn, Between Eskdale and Wasdale
- Buttermere
- Chapelhouse Reservoir, south-east of Uldale
- Codale Tarn, east of High Raise and the Langdale Pikes
- Cogra Moss, between Ennerdale Water and Loweswater
- Coniston Water
- Crummock Water
- Dalehead Tarn, between Dale Head and High Spy
- Derwent Water
- Devoke Water
- Dock Tarn, east of Rosthwaite, south of Watendlath
- Easedale Tarn, west of Grasmere
- Elter Water
- Ennerdale Water
- Esthwaite Water
- Floutern Tarn, north of Great Borne
- Foxes Tarn, north of Scafell
- Goat's Water, west of the Old Man of Coniston
- Grasmere
- Greendale Tarn, by Middle Fell near Wasdale
- Green Hows tarn Graythwaite
- Upper Green How’s tarn Graythwaite
- Grisedale Tarn, between Fairfield and Dollywaggon Pike
- Gurnal Dubs, west of Garnett Bridge
- Harrop Tarn, in the Wythburn fells, west of Thirlmere
- Haweswater Reservoir
- Hayeswater
- Heights Tarn
- Helton Tarn, northwest of Witherslack
- High Dam Tarn, west of the southern end of Windermere
- High House Tarn, south of Glaramara
- Innominate Tarn, on Haystacks
- Kelly Hall Tarn, south-east of Torver
- Kentmere Reservoir
- Knipe Tarn, south-east of Bowness-on-Windermere
- Lanty's Tarn, west of Patterdale
- Launchy Tarn, on Dale Head
- Levers Water, on the east side of the Coniston fells
- Lily Tarn, north of Clappersgate
- Lingmoor Tarn, on Lingmoor Fell
- Little Langdale Tarn
- Little Tarn, near Orthwaite, south of Uldale
- Littlewater Tarn, near Bampton
- Long Moss, between Torver and Coniston Water
- Loughrigg Tarn, below Loughrigg
- Loweswater
- Low Tarn, south of Red Pike, between Yewbarrow and the Seatallan-Haycock ridge
- Low Water, north of the Old Man of Coniston
- Meadley Reservoir, by Flat Fell, Ennerdale
- Mortimere, south of Clappersgate
- Moss Eccles Tarn, between Windermere and Esthwaite Water
- Over Water, south of Uldale
- Parkgate Tarn, near Eskdale
- Potter Tarn, west of Garnett Bridge
- Red Tarn (Helvellyn), below the summit of Helvellyn
- Red Tarn (Langdale), between Cold Pike and Pike of Blisco
- Rydal Water
- Scales Tarn, below the summit of Blencathra and Sharp Edge
- Schoolknott Tarn, south east of the town of Windermere
- Scoat Tarn, below Red Pike and Scoat Fell
- Seathwaite Tarn, west of the Coniston fells
- Simpson Ground Reservoir, east of Staveley-in-Cartmel
- Siney Tarn, north of Eskdale
- Skeggles Water, between Kentmere and Longsleddale
- Slew Tarn, east of Skelwith Bridge
- Small Water, between Mardale Ill Bell and Harter Fell
- Sow How Tarn
- Sprinkling Tarn, between Scafell Pike and Seathwaite Fell
- Stickle Tarn, Langdale, below Pavey Ark in the Langdale Pikes
- Styhead Tarn, at the head of Styhead Gill, at Sty Head Pass, between Scafell Pike and Great Gable
- Tarn at Leaves on Rosthwaite Fell
- Tarn Hows
- Tewet Tarn, below Low Rigg near St John's in the Vale
- Thirlmere
- Three Dubs Tarn, between Windermere and Esthwaite Water
- Three Tarns, between Bowfell and Crinkle Crags
- Torver Tarn, disused reservoir on Torver Low Common
- Tosh Tarn, south east of Wast Water, near the River Irt
- Ullswater
- Wast Water
- Watendlath Tarn
- Wet Sleddale Reservoir
- Windermere
- Wise Een Tarn, between Windermere and Esthwaite Water
- Woodhow Tarn, south east of Wast Water, near the River Irt
- Yew Tree Tarn, between Holme Fell and Tarn Hows

== Former lakes, tarns and reservoirs ==
- Baystone Bank Reservoir, east of Black Combe (disused and then removed in 2011)
- Keppel Cove Tarn, north of Catstycam, dam destroyed by flood, 1931
