= Blea Tarn =

Blea Tarn may refer to:

- Blea Tarn (Borrowdale), small lake above Watendlath in Borrowdale in English Lake District
- Blea Tarn (Eskdale), small lake in Eskdale in English Lake District
- Blea Tarn (Langdale), small lake in Little Langdale in English Lake District

== See also ==
- Blea Water, small lake east of High Street in English Lake District
- Blea Tarn Reservoir, above Lancaster, Lancashire
- Blea Tarn Fell, alternative name for Bell Crags, mountain in English Lake District
