= Angle Tarn =

Angle Tarn may refer to:

- Angle Tarn (Langstrath), small lake in Cumbria, England
- Angle Tarn (Patterdale), small lake in Cumbria, England

== See also ==
- Angletarn Pikes, mountain near Patterdale, Cumbria, England
