= Great Crag =

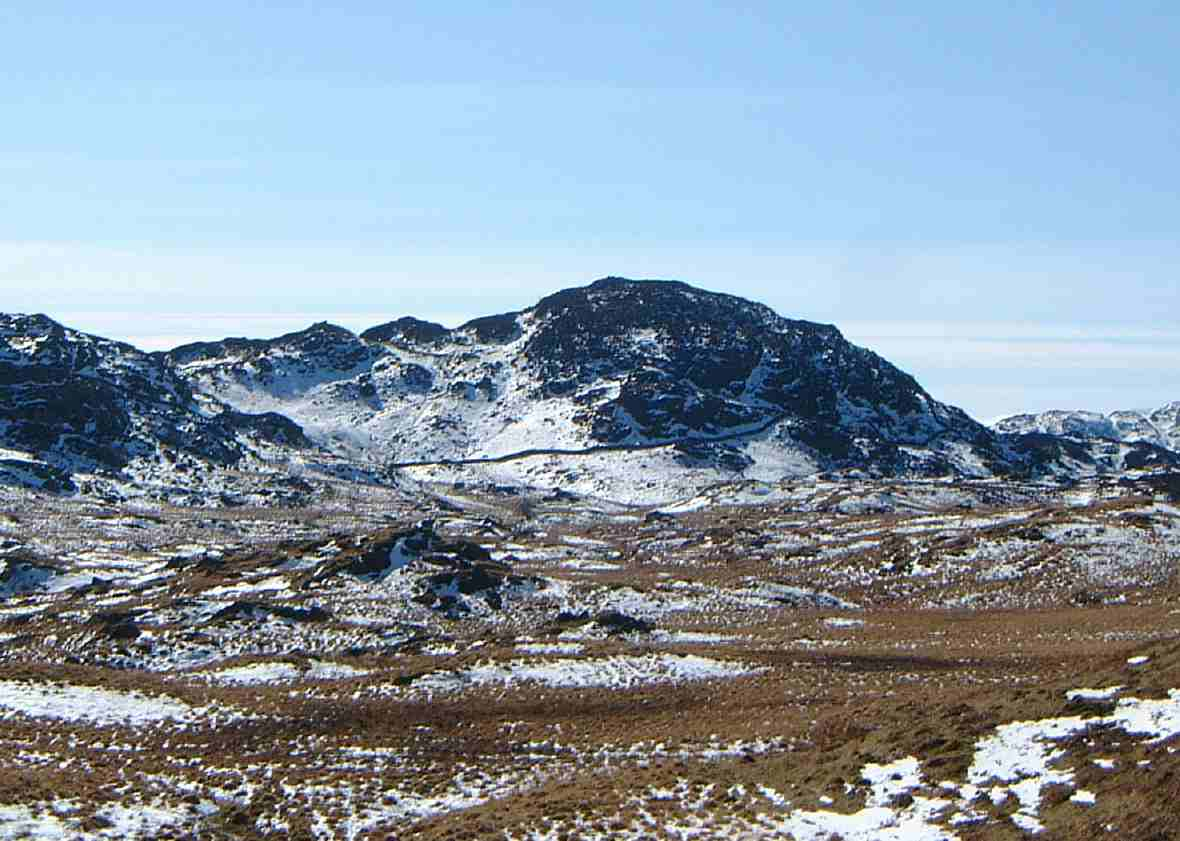
- Great Crag seen from the Rosthwaite to Watendlath bridleway

Highest point
- Elevation: 440 m (1,440 ft)
- Prominence: 27 m (89 ft)
- Parent peak: Ullscarf
- Listing: Wainwright
- Coordinates: 54°31′20″N 3°07′51″W

Geography
- Location within the Lake District Location within the former Allerdale Borough
- Location: Cumbria, England
- Parent range: Lake District, Central Fells
- OS grid: NY269147
- Topo map: OS Explorer OL4

Great Crag is a fell in the English Lake District, located near the hamlets of Rosthwaite and Stonethwaite in Borrowdale.

== Topography ==
The higher slopes are heather-covered and quite rocky, while the lower steep slopes on the Borrowdale side are covered by a mature oak wood. Half a kilometre south-east of the summit lies the attractive Dock Tarn which is often visited by walkers on their way to or from Great Crag.

At 440 metres (1,444 ft), Great Crag is not high by Lake District standards, and its small topographic prominence means that it is essentially a minor summit on the broad north-western slopes of Ullscarf. However, its rocky summit stands out amid the relatively featureless moorland and is the culmination of a steep slope rising out of Borrowdale; this ensures that it is considered a fell in its own right, and it is given this status in Alfred Wainwright's Pictorial Guide to the Lakeland Fells.

== Geology ==
The summit area is composed of the plagioclase-phyric andesite lavas of the Birker Fell Formation with the andesitic lapilli tuff of the Wet Side Edge Member outcropping to the south. Small intrusions of dolerite are also present.

== Ascents ==
Ascents of Great Crag can be started from the hamlets of Rosthwaite, Stonethwaite or Watendlath. The Rosthwaite route uses the bridleway to Watendlath until the highest point is reached then goes southerly over boggy moorland and then more firmer rocky ground to reach the summit. The Stonethwaite path climbs steeply through woodland before reaching Dock Tarn; it is then a short ascent from the tarn north-westwards to the summit. These two routes can be combined to make a circular walk starting and finishing in Rosthwaite. The ascent from Watendlath utilises the popular path to Dock Tarn which has been diverted by signposts to avoid the worst of the boggy ground to the north of the fell; this path takes the walker very close to the summit and it is a simple climb through heather to attain the highest point.

== Summit ==
The highest point of the fell is difficult to ascertain as there are two tops of very similar height marked by cairns. The view from the top is not extensive but there is a good prospect of Borrowdale with the higher fells behind.
