= Dock Tarn =

Lake in Cumbria, England

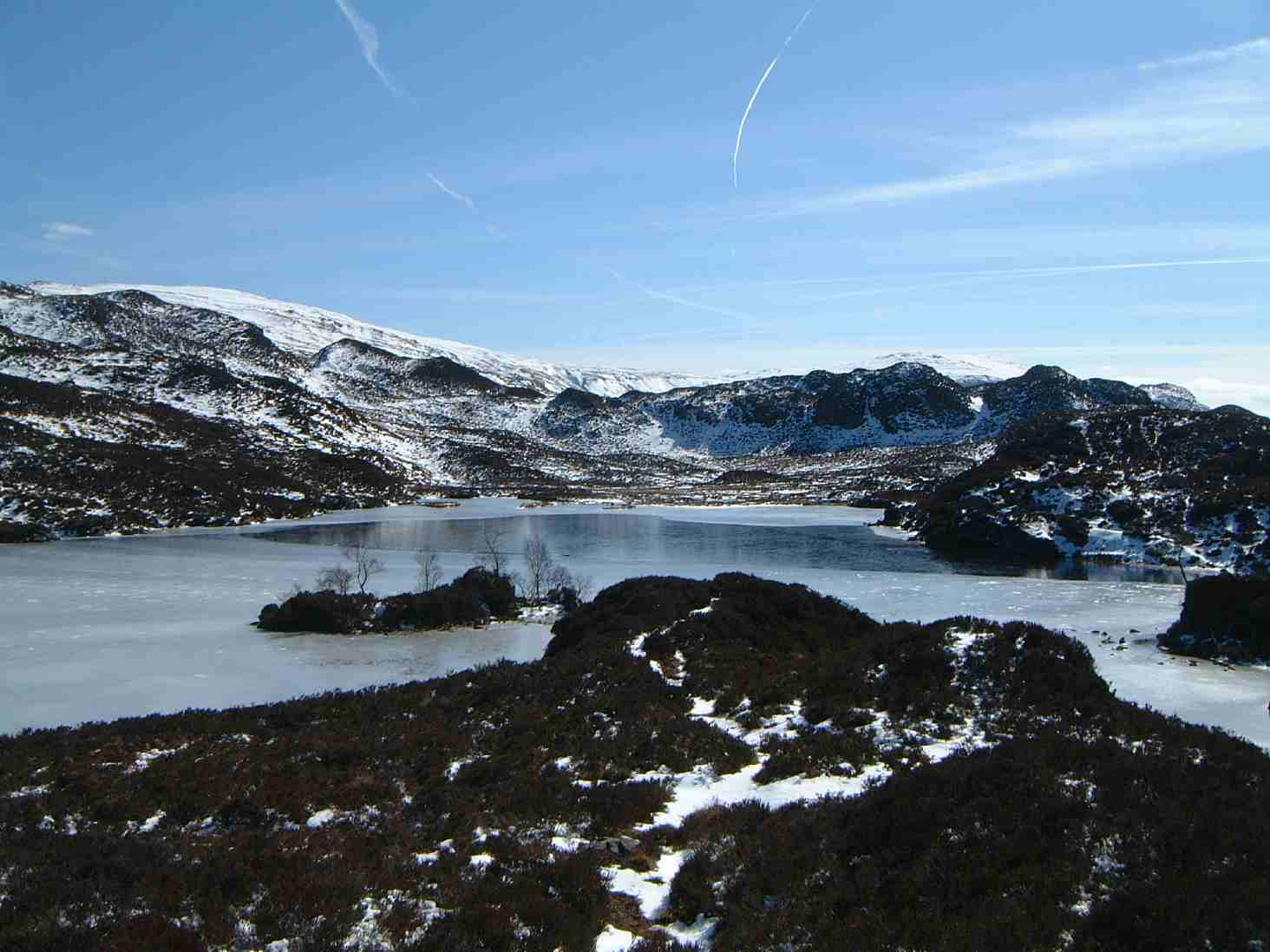
- The frozen tarn with the small island in view

- Location in the Lake District National Park Location in Allerdale, Cumbria
- Location: Lake District, Cumbria
- Coordinates: 54.51876°N 3.12460°W
- Basin countries: United Kingdom
- Surface elevation: 400 m (1,300 ft)

Dock Tarn is a small tarn located within the Lake District National Park in Cumbria, England, at grid reference NY273143. It is situated on moorland at 400 metres above sea level near the summit of Great Crag, midway between Watendlath, the Stonethwaite valley and Borrowdale. It measures approximately 300 by 200 metres, and the shoreline is indented with rocky headlands and bays. There is a tiny island in the tarn with a few small Rowan trees growing on it. Many Lake District writers rate Dock Tarn and the walk to it very highly because of its quiet beauty.

The tarn can be reached from Watendlath by a 2.5 kilometre walk along a path that climbs very close to the summit of Great Crag; many walkers include the ascent of this fell in the outing. The approach from Stonethwaite is of a similar distance but is more arduous, going steeply through the deciduous woodland in the valley before following the stream of Willygrass Gill, which is the outflow of Dock Tarn.
