= Ashness Bridge =

Bridge in Borrowdale, Cumbria, England

Coordinates: 54.5672045°N 3.1301167°W

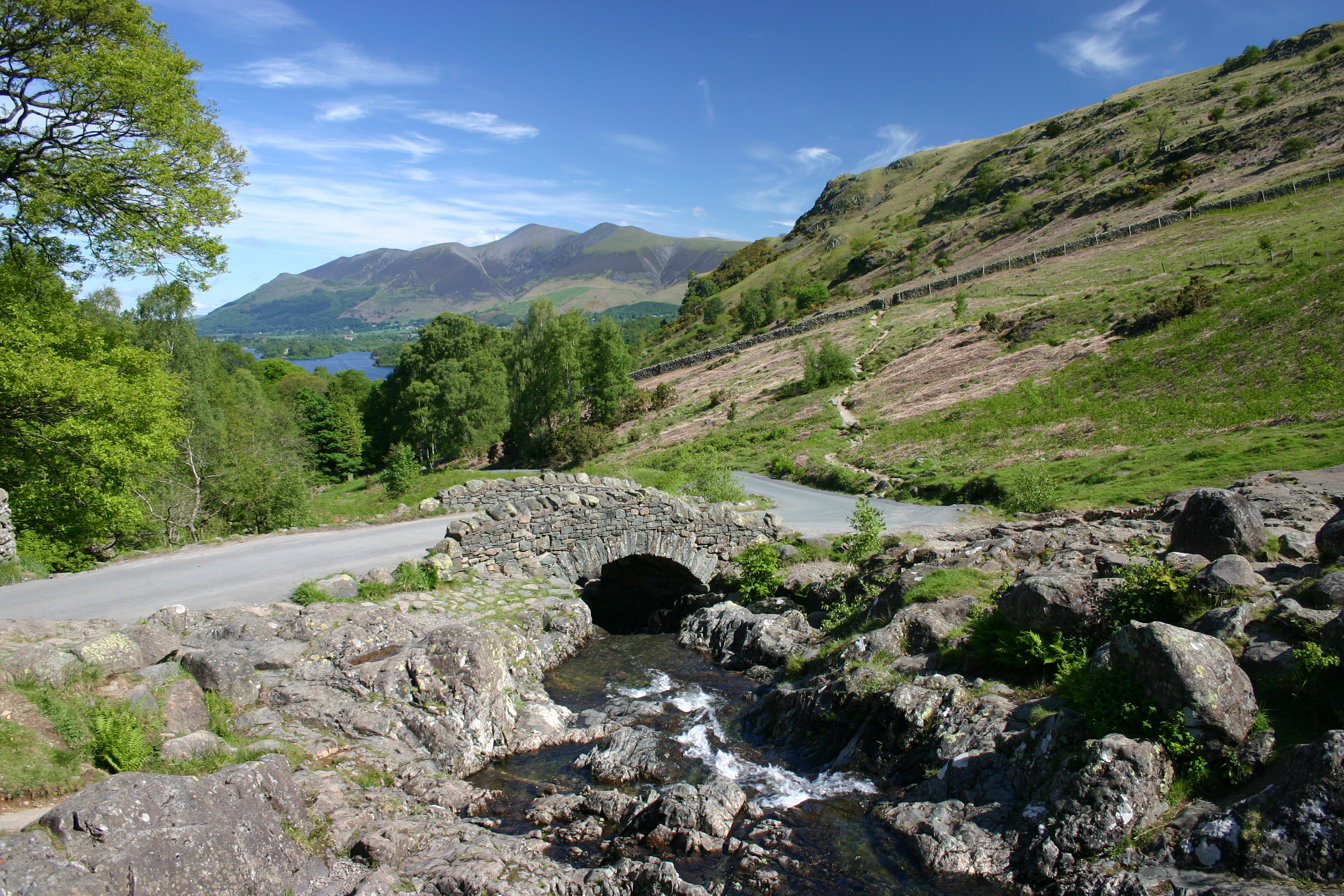
Ashness Bridge

Ashness Bridge is a traditional stone-built bridge on the single-track road from the Borrowdale road (B5289) to Watendlath, in the English Lake District, Cumbria.

The bridge is at grid reference NY270196, and is known for being a fine viewpoint across Borrowdale towards Skiddaw, including views of Derwent Water nearby.

It or its predecessor may have been a packhorse bridge conveying packhorse traffic from Watendlath to Keswick.

Near the bridge is a small cairn to Bob Graham, who ran a round of 42 Lakeland peaks in 1932 in under 24 hours, a record which was not equalled for 28 years.

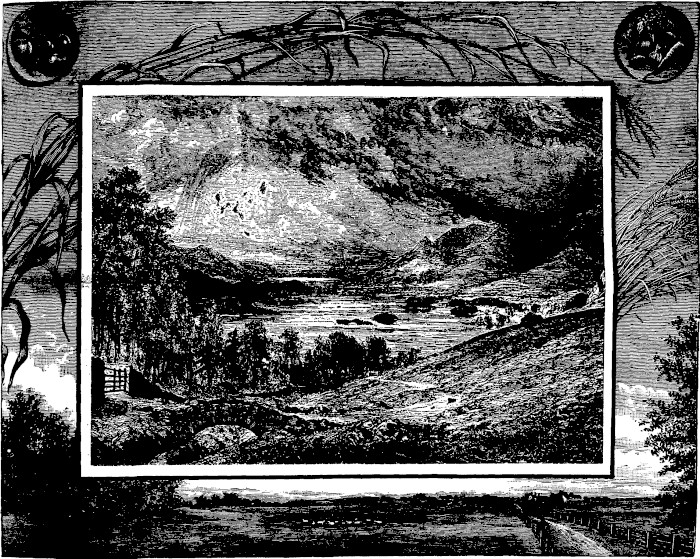
The Derwent and Bassenthwaite waters from Ashness Bridge.

The area is owned by the National Trust.

== See also ==
- Birks Bridge
- Listed buildings in Borrowdale
- Slater's Bridge
