= Margaret Cropper =

Margaret Cropper (1886–1980) was a Westmorland poet, author and hymnist, who rivalled Norman Nicholson as the leading 20th-century Lake Poet.

== Life and writings ==
The fourth of five children, Margaret Cropper was born into a long-established Quaker family of Burneside, near Kendal, where she would live for the majority of her life.

Her first book of poems – Poems – was published by Elkin Mathews in 1914, and was followed between the wars by further collections of short poems, mainly concerned with local people and the Lakeland landscape. She also wrote two longer poems in the 1930s, Little Mary Crosbie and The End of the Road, which charted the life of the Westmoreland poor, and did so in a standard English that conveyed the full sense of the local dialect as well.

Norman Nicholson would later single her out for her exceptional ability to capture the Cumbrian vernacular, without resorting (as did others) to phonetic spelling or similar expedients. Some of the products of her work were included by Robert Wilson Lynd in his 1939 Anthology of Modern Poetry, while G. M. Trevelyan praised her poem The Broken Hearthstone especially for its ability to capture the personality of a mountain.

In the post-war years, she turned largely to prose-writing, with her biography of her friend, Evelyn Underhill, The Life of Evelyn Underhill (1958), and her study of 19th-century Anglicanism, Flame Touches Flame (London, 1949). She is also known for her hymns and religious plays.

=== The Wordsworths ===
Cropper's poem on Dorothy Wordsworth says:

William's genius, unfaltering here, was sure
When he saw her kin to the natural wild things,
The lover and beloved of the sheltered valley,
And high enfolding hills

== See also ==
- John Betjeman
- Little Langdale
- Mountains of the Mind
- Mysticism
