= Blea Tarn (Eskdale) =

Upland lake in Cumbria, England

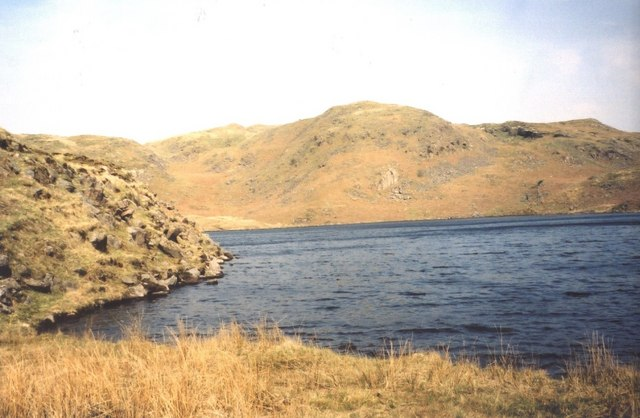

- Location in the Lake District Location in Copeland Borough
- Location: Lake District, Cumbria
- Coordinates: 54°23′51″N 3°17′10″W
- Type: Tarn
- Basin countries: United Kingdom
- Max. length: 277 m (909 ft)
- Max. width: 150 m (490 ft)
- Surface area: 3.3 hectares (8.2 acres)
- Max. depth: 11 m (36 ft)
- Surface elevation: 217 m (712 ft)

Blea Tarn is a lake in Eskdale, Cumbria, in the English Lake District, located about half a mile north of Beckfoot. Located at an elevation of 217 m (712 ft), the lake has an area of 3.3 hectares (8.2 acres) and measures 277 m × 150 m (909 ft × 492 ft), with a maximum depth of 11 m (36 ft).

There are other lakes called "Blea Tarn" in the Lake District (in Borrowdale and Little Langdale). John Taylor commented in 1905 that

in the ... days when place-names were being given, the inhabitants of one of our secluded valleys were so cut off from their fellows that they would call a rock Eagle Crag or a small sheet of water Blea Tarn, quite unaware that on the other side of the hill the same titles were being afiixed to other cliffs and waters.
