= Claife Heights =

Upland area in Cumbria, England

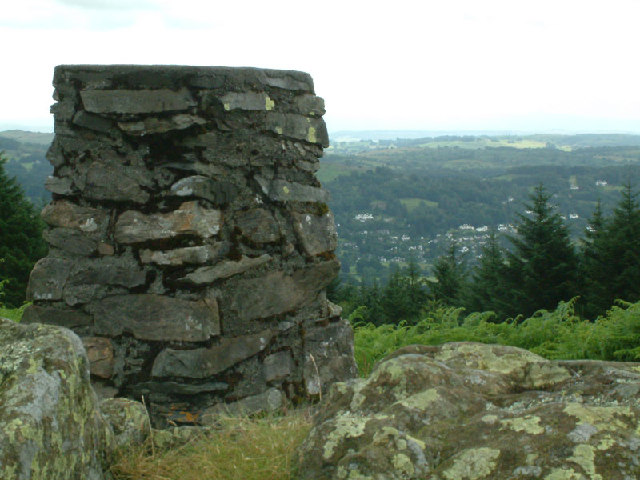
- Claife Heights Trig Point

Highest point
- Elevation: 270 m (890 ft)
- Prominence: 177
- Parent peak: Top o'Selside
- Listing: Marilyn
- Coordinates: 54°22′05″N 2°57′07″W

Geography
- Location within the Lake District
- Location: Cumbria, England
- Parent range: Lake District South Eastern Fells
- OS grid: SD382973

Claife Heights is an upland area in the Lake District, near to Windermere in Cumbria, England. It has a topographic prominence of 177 metres (581 ft) so is classified as a Marilyn (a hill with prominence of at least 150m).

It is the subject of a chapter of Wainwright's book The Outlying Fells of Lakeland. He describes a clockwise circuit starting at Far Sawrey and passing Moss Eccles Tarn. He says "Claife Heights is delightful. It was more so before forestry curtailed walking and restricted the views." and describes it as "No definite summit. Highest parts about 900ft."
