= Moss Eccles Tarn =

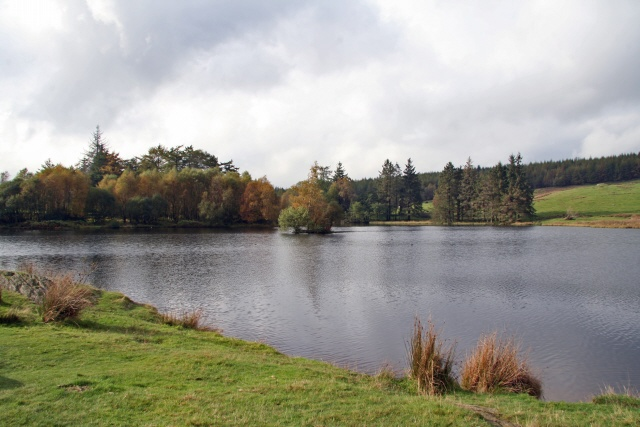

- Location within Cumbria
- Coordinates: 54.363°N 2.968°W
- Type: Tarn or reservoir
- Surface area: 5 acres (2.0 ha)

Moss Eccles Tarn is a tarn on Claife Heights, near Near Sawrey in the Lake District, Cumbria. It is currently owned by the National Trust and visited by anglers and walkers. It is known for its association with Beatrix Potter – she owned part of the tarn and donated it to the National Trust after her death, and it served as inspiration for some of her stories.

== Description ==
The tarn is on Claife Heights. Alfred Wainwright calls it the "most attractive" tarn on Claife Heights; it is stocked with water lilies and fish, and surrounded by rhododendrons. The outflow is bridged by a small dam. The tarn is best reached by following a track from Near Sawrey, a small village between Hawkshead and Windermere.

== History ==
Wainwright contends the "tarn" to be a reservoir, noting that none of the tarns on Claife Heights appear on 19th-century maps. He notes, however, that they are "not obtrusively artificial". After Beatrix Potter and her husband William Heelis married in 1913, they lived in Castle Cottage in Far Sawrey and rowed on the tarn in summer evenings. Potter sketched near the tarn and her husband fished in it. In 1926, Potter bought part of the tarn, planting the water lilies and stocking it with fish. Along with much other land, it was left to the National Trust by Potter upon her death in 1943. It was probably a combination of Moss Eccles Tarn and Esthwaite Water that served as inspiration for the home of Jeremy Fisher in The Tale of Mr. Jeremy Fisher; the road to the tarn from Near Sawrey was also drawn by Potter for The Tale of Samuel Whiskers or The Roly-Poly Pudding. The "strange, flat bottomed boat" in which Potter and Heelis rowed is now housed in the Windermere Steamboat Museum; it was salvaged from the tarn in 1976.

== Fishing ==
The tarn is stocked with brown trout, and the fishing rights are controlled by the Windermere, Ambleside and District Anglish Association on behalf of the National Trust. The membership of the association is open, and tickets to fish in the tarn can be bought from local pubs, service stations and fishing shops. There is a limit to two fish per day per person.
