= Lanty Slee =

Lancelot Slee
- Born: 1800 / 1802
- Died: 1878
- Other name: Lanty Slee
- Occupations: Farmer, Quarryman, Smuggler
- Known for: Smuggling

Lancelot 'Lanty' Slee (1800/1802–1878) was a Lake District farmer, quarryman and notorious smuggler. The name 'Lanty' is a diminutive for Lancelot used in the Lake District.

== Life ==
Slee, a 'stiff, fresh faced man of great endurance', was of Irish descent but originally came from Borrowdale and lived in Little Langdale for most of his life. He is variously reported to have been a farmer and a quarryman as a day job but also had a thriving business in smuggling. Slee operated multiple illicit stills for production of moonshine whisky which he sold for 10 shillings per gallon, or smuggled with pack horses via Wrynose Pass and Hardknott to Ravenglass. He transported smuggled tobacco on the return journey. The whisky was sold to "discerning local gentry and professional classes" including a local magistrate.

One of his many stills and stores throughout Langdale and the surrounding area was in a cave in Moss Rigg quarry in Little Langdale; the cave is now walled up. Another was hidden in a quarry scar on the route up to Betsy Crag where remnants of his equipment still survived until the 1960s. A still beneath Low Arnside Farm was connected to an underground pipe so that the steam produced seemingly emanated from a hedge in a nearby field. 'Lanty's Cave', his largest still, was in a field at Arnside.

In 1840 Slee built Greenbank Farm in Little Langdale where he then lived for some time before subsequently moving to Low Arnside.

He was convicted at least twice although his stills and stashes of moonshine were hardly ever found by the excise men and his wit led to hilarious episodes in the Ambleside courtrooms. Lanty fathered a son named Joseph in 1850 when he was living at Low Arnside. His occupation listed on the baptism register at that time was a farmer. Another son named Adam lived to be more than 100.

William Pattinson, Lanty's business partner, informed on him to the local magistrates after a quarrel relating to the business. Slee was convicted of illegal distillation of liquor in May 1853 and fined £150. Pattinson fled the area. In 1855 he is listed as still living at Low Arnside but subsequently Slee moved back to Little Langdale and set up new stills. He died at Greenbank Farm in 1878.

== Legacy ==
The Lanty Slee Liquor Company was registered in 2018 at Companies House for "Distilling, rectifying and blending of spirits " and "Wholesale of wine, beer, spirits and other alcoholic beverages". They produce a range of distilled drinks inspired by Slee, saying "We discovered his ingredients from 1841 court records and ... using historic production methods we have reimagined his Moonshine Vodka ... It is from this very valley that we source our water and botanicals, just as Lanty did ...". and they operate two bars named "Lanty Slee" in Elterwater village and in the National Trust-owned Sticklebarn in Great Langdale.
