= Cogra Moss =

Reservoir in Lake District, England

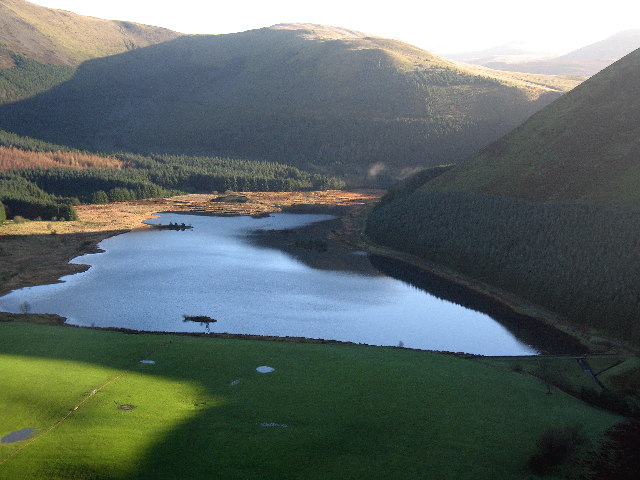

- Location in the Lake District Location in Copeland Borough
- Location: Lake District
- Coordinates: 54°33′48″N 3°24′04″W
- Type: reservoir
- Catchment area: 245 hectares (0.95 sq mi)
- Basin countries: United Kingdom
- Surface area: 16 hectares (40 acres)
- Average depth: 5.4 metres (18 ft)
- Water volume: 0.84×10^{6} m^{3} (680 acre⋅ft)
- Shore length^{1}: 2 km (1.2 mi)
- Surface elevation: 225 metres (738 ft)
- ^{1} Shore length is not a well-defined measure.

Cogra Moss is a shallow reservoir to the east of the village of Lamplugh on the western edge of the English Lake District. It was created by the damming of Rakegill Beck in about 1880, though its function as a water supply ceased in 1975. The reservoir, which is surrounded by forestry plantations on three sides, is popular with walkers and anglers.
