= Bell Crags =

Hill in Cumbria, England

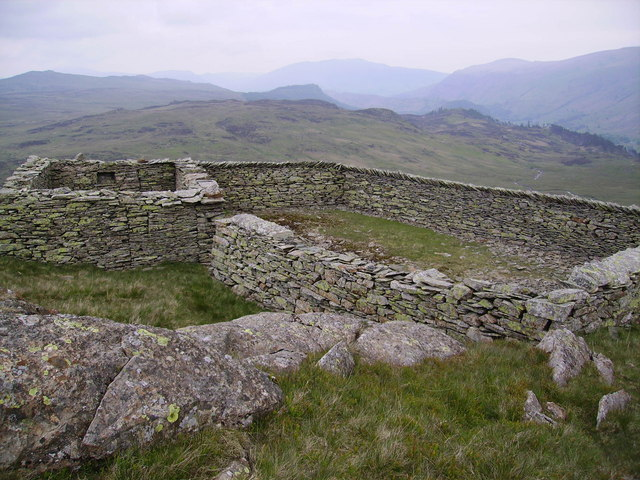
- Sheepfold on Bell Crags

Highest point
- Elevation: 559.1 m (1,834 ft)
- Prominence: 32.4 m (106 ft)
- Parent peak: High Raise
- Listing: Dodd, Dewey, Birkett, Synge, Fellranger
- Coordinates: 54°32′54″N 3°06′12″W

Geography
- Location within the Lake District
- Location: Lake District, England
- OS grid: NY 298143
- Topo map: OS Landranger 89, 90

Bell Crags (also known as Long Moss or Blea Tarn Fell) is a hill of 559.1 metres (1,834 ft) in the Lake District, England. It lies between Borrowdale to its west and Thirlmere to its east, and is north of Ullscarf. Below it to the west is one of several Lake District tarns named Blea Tarn, this one flowing out via Bleatarn Gill to Watendlath Tarn.

Bell Crags is a Fellranger, being included in Mark Richards' The Old Man of Coniston, Swirl How, Wetherlam and the South as one of the 18 (now 21) of his 227 (230 with the extension of the national park) summits which are not in Alfred Wainwright's list of 214. It is also classified as a Dodd, Dewey, Birkett and Synge. The highest point is a boulder 85 metres (279 ft) north of the cairn.

Richards describes Bell Crags as "a great viewpoint above low crags and the morass of Launchy Gill" and "the wedge of rough country rising west from the shores of Thirlmere between Launchy and Dob Gills, initially as craggy afforestation but later as a wonderfully wild fell", and describes ascent routes from both Thirlmere and Watendlath.

There are several other places named Bell Crags including a hill of 332 metres (1,089 ft) in Northumberland, about 1.5 kilometres (0.93 mi) west of the Pennine Way and about 4 kilometres (2.5 mi) north of Hadrian's Wall.
