= Blelham Tarn =

Lake in Cumbria, England

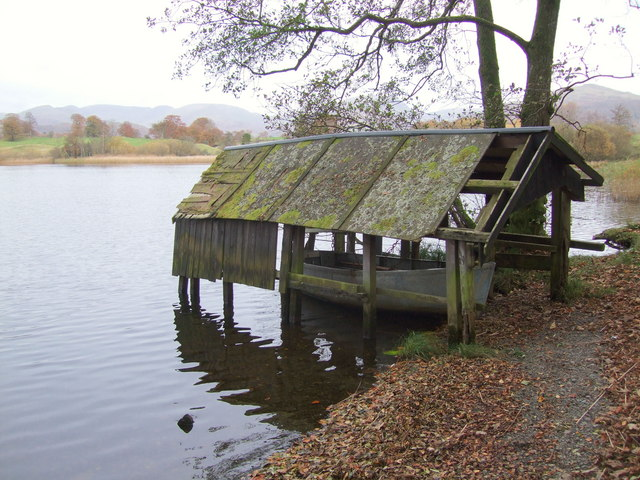
- The boathouse on the tarn in 2007

- Location in the Lake District National Park Location in South Lakeland, Cumbria
- Location: Cumbria
- Coordinates: 54°23′44″N 2°58′41″W
- Type: natural
- Etymology: dark blue pool
- Primary outflows: Blelham Beck
- Max. length: 0.66 km (0.41 mi)
- Max. width: 0.257 km (0.160 mi)
- Surface area: 11 ha (27 acres)
- Average depth: 6.8 m (22 ft)
- Max. depth: 14.5 m (48 ft)
- Water volume: 717,829 cubic metres (582 acre⋅ft)
- Residence time: 50 days
- Surface elevation: 47 m (154 ft)

Blelham Tarn is a large valley tarn in the Lake District of England, to the north of the hill Latterbarrow. The settlements of Outgate, Low Wray and High Wray are close by. The tarn is drained to the northeast by the short Blelham Beck into Windermere. This beck was previously straightened and lowered. Fish species in the tarn include brown trout, eel, perch, pike and roach, much of the tarn shore is reedbed and waterfowl present can include great crested grebe, whooper swan and golden-eye.

The tarn is regularly monitored by the United Kingdom Lake Ecological Observatory Network and is characterised as eutrophic and monomictic and has suffered from agricultural water pollution with large quantities of blue-green algae in the summer. The lake temperature at various depths varied over the period July 2012 to November 2014 between 2 and 25 Celsius as the air temperature (3 m above the surface) varied between -3 and 22 Celsius. Over the same period the pH varied from 6.4 to 9.8 and the dissolved oxygen ranged from 7 to 14 mg/L.

Blelham Tarn and Bog, with a total area of 49 hectares, is designated a site of special scientific interest and Blelham Bog is designated a National Nature Reserve The bog contains various species of sphagnum moss, bog myrtle, cotton-grass and the white-beaked sedge; and rare caddis-flies and vertigo lilljeborgi.
