= Kelly Hall Tarn =

- Location in the Lake District National Park Location in South Lakeland, Cumbria
- Location: Cumbria, England
- Coordinates: 54.330°N 3.0954°W
- Type: tarn (lake)

Kelly Hall Tarn is a pool in Cumbria, England, to the west of Coniston Water. It is located about one km south-south-east of the village of Torver, on Torver Back Common. Its name is said to be derived from a nearby building that has since disappeared. The location offers excellent views of the Old Man of Coniston.

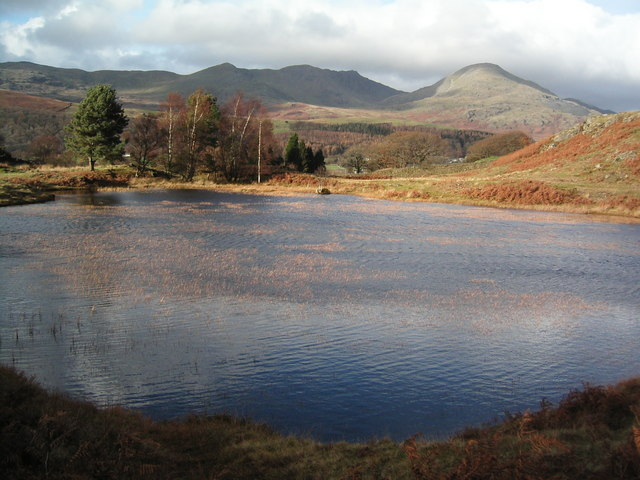
In autumn

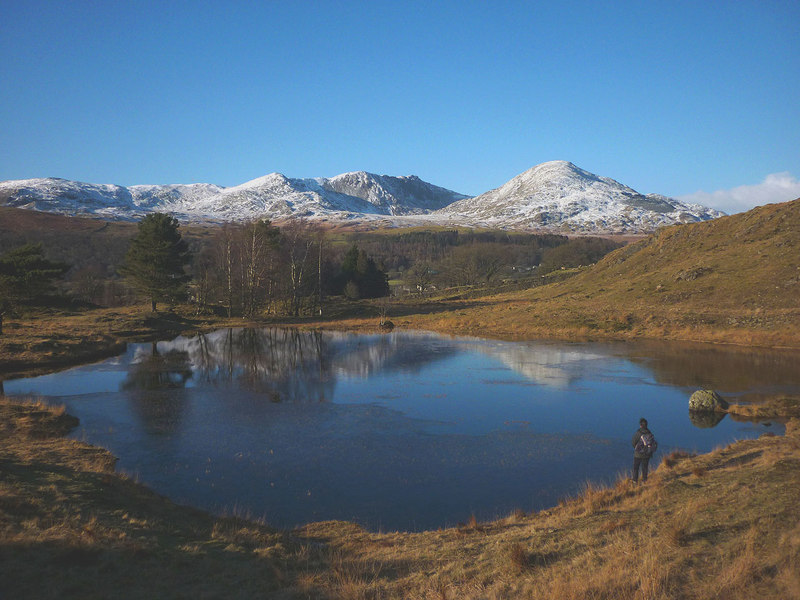
In winter
