= Lingmoor Fell =

Fell in the Lake District, Cumbria, England

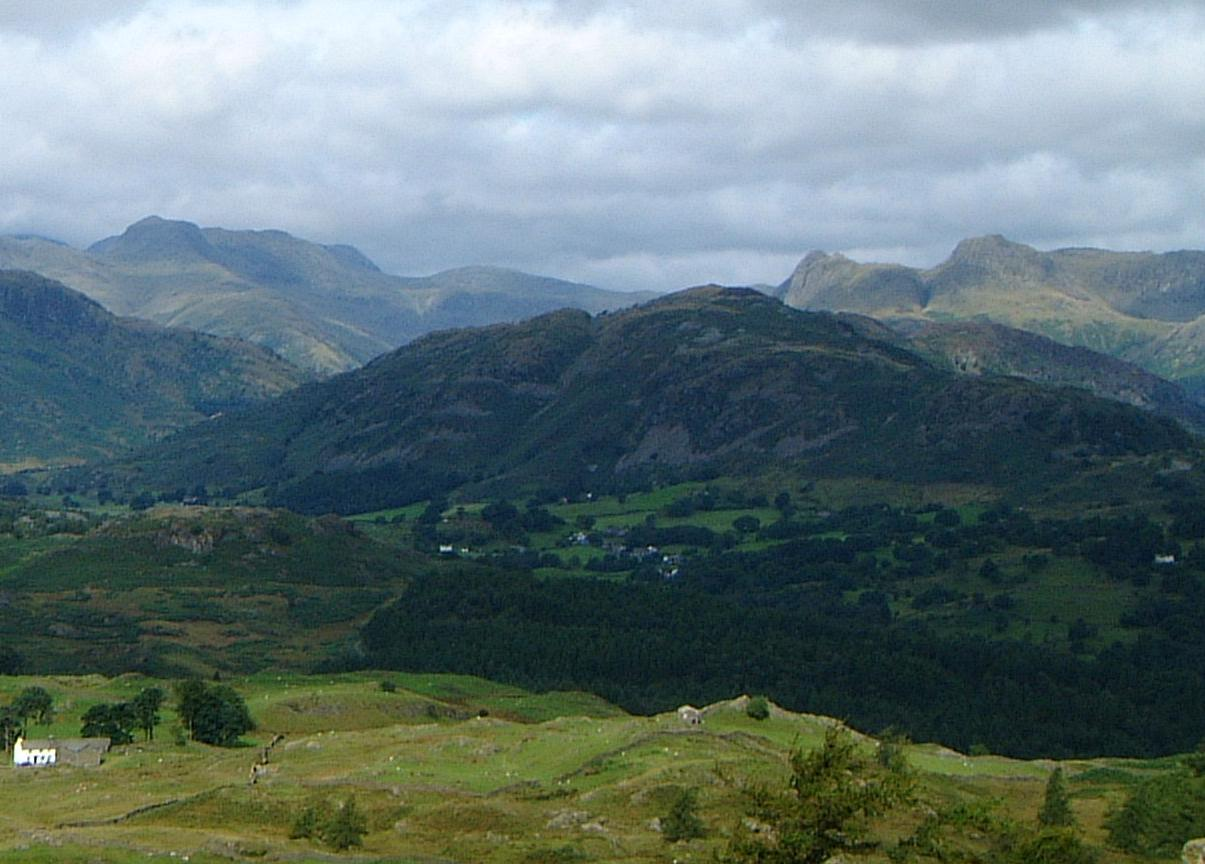
- Lingmoor Fell from Black Fell, 5 km to the SE, with Bowfell and the Langdale Pikes in the distance

Highest point
- Elevation: 469 m (1,539 ft)
- Prominence: 245 m (804 ft)
- Parent peak: Scafell Pike
- Listing: Marilyn, Wainwright
- Coordinates: 54°25′55″N 3°04′35″W

Geography
- Location within the Lake District
- Location: Cumbria, England
- Parent range: Lake District, Southern Fells
- OS grid: NY302046
- Topo map: OS Landranger 89, 90 OS Explorer OL6

Lingmoor Fell is a fell in the English Lake District, situated eight kilometres (five miles) west of Ambleside. The fell reaches a height of 469 m (1,540 ft) and divides the valleys of Great Langdale and Little Langdale. The fell's name originates from the Old Norse word lyng meaning “heather covered”. The actual summit of the fell is named as Brown How on Ordnance Survey maps.

== Topography ==
Although it is surrounded by higher and better-known fells, Lingmoor Fell is quite separate and distinct with no connecting ridges to other fells, giving it a considerable (for such a small fell) topographic prominence of 245 metres (804 feet), making it a Marilyn hill. Lingmoor Fell has a subsidiary top, known as Side Pike (362 m, 1,187 ft), which lies 1.5 kilometres (0.9 miles) to the north-west. This is a fine rock tower accessible only from the west and south. Walkers wishing to visit Side Pike from Lingmoor Fell are blocked by unassailable crags and must traverse round to easier slopes to the south.

The fell's northern and eastern flanks are clothed in deciduous woodland up to the 200-metre contour, and there are also patches of heather and bracken on these lower slopes. Lingmoor Tarn, an attractive mountain lake about 200 metres (about 650 feet) in length with a couple of small islands, lies 600 metres (about 650 yards) north of the summit. One kilometre (0.6 miles) north of the summit of the fell stands another topographic feature; this is the detached rock pinnacle of Oak Howe Needle. The needle is part of Oak Howe Crag, a popular climbing location on the fell, with over ten routes on Rhyolite crags.

== Geology ==
The summit area is formed from a large sill of andesite, overlying the dacitic lapilli tuff of the Lingmoor Fell Formation.

== Quarrying ==
Lingmoor Fell's north-eastern slopes above the villages of Elterwater and Chapel Stile have long been quarried for its high-quality Westmorland green slate. The Burlington quarry at Elterwater has been worked for over 300 years and is still in production today, turning out over 800 tonnes of slate annually. Many of the quarries have closed over the years and the crags are now used by rock climbers.

== Ascents ==
Lingmoor Fell can be climbed either from Elterwater in Great Langdale or from the Blea Tarn car park in Little Langdale (grid reference NY296043). The latter route makes use of an old quarry track for much of the way. The Elterwater route can be slightly confusing in its early stages as there are a jumble of paths through the lower woodland and quarries, the route becomes clear once the open fell has been reached.

== Summit ==
The summit of the fell is crossed by a high dry stone wall, which in fact traverses the entire spine of the fell, starting at the eastern foot and terminating abruptly at the crags below Side Pike in the west before re-commencing on the plateau. The wall is affectionately known locally as "The Great Wall of Lingmoor". Lingmoor Fell, Langdale Pikes, and all of the high fells around the head of Great Langdale can be viewed from the summit, as can Coniston Fells to the south-west.

== Gallery ==
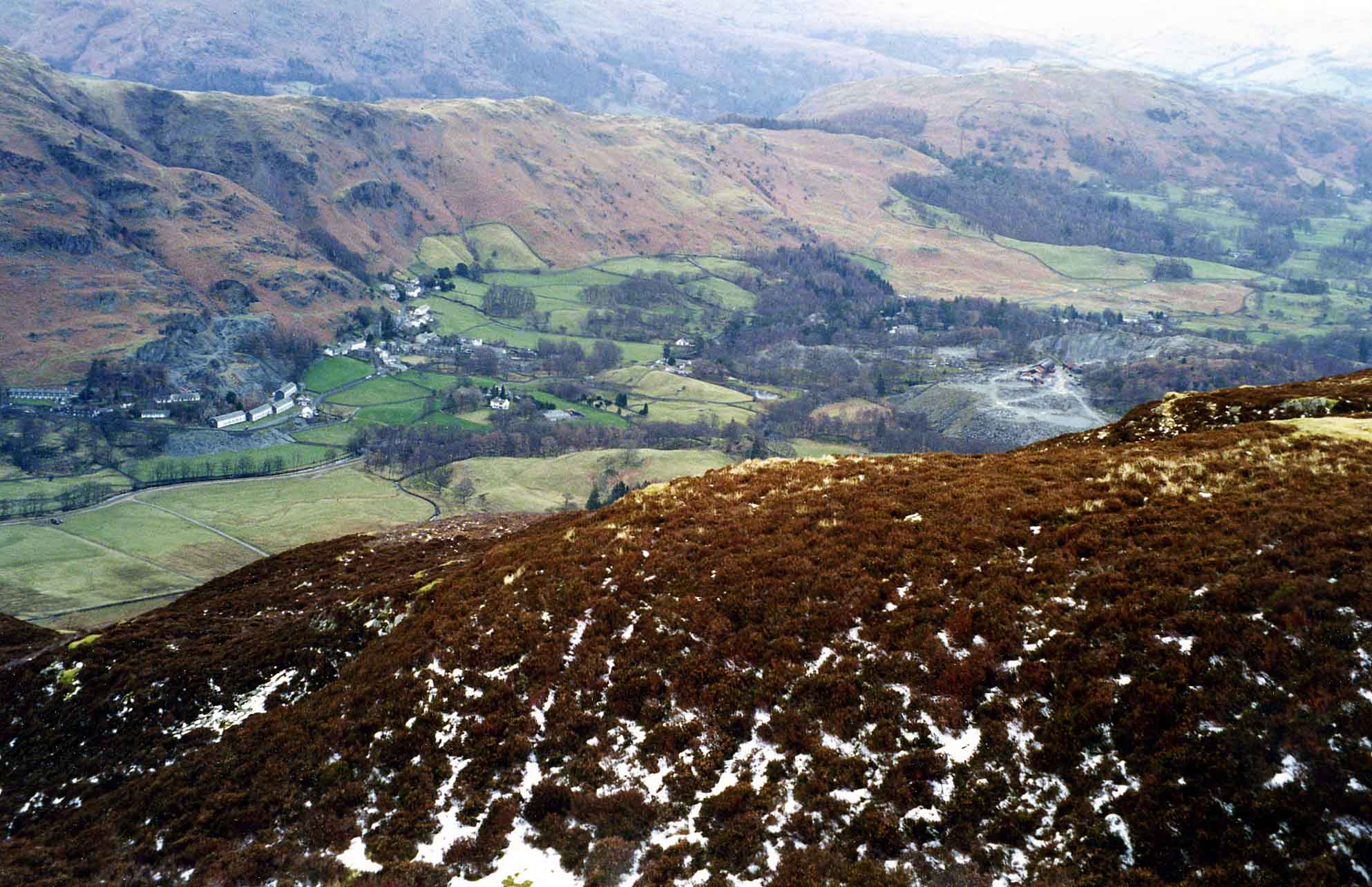
Looking NE from the summit of Lingmoor Fell with Chapel Stile and the Burlington quarry in view in Great Langdale

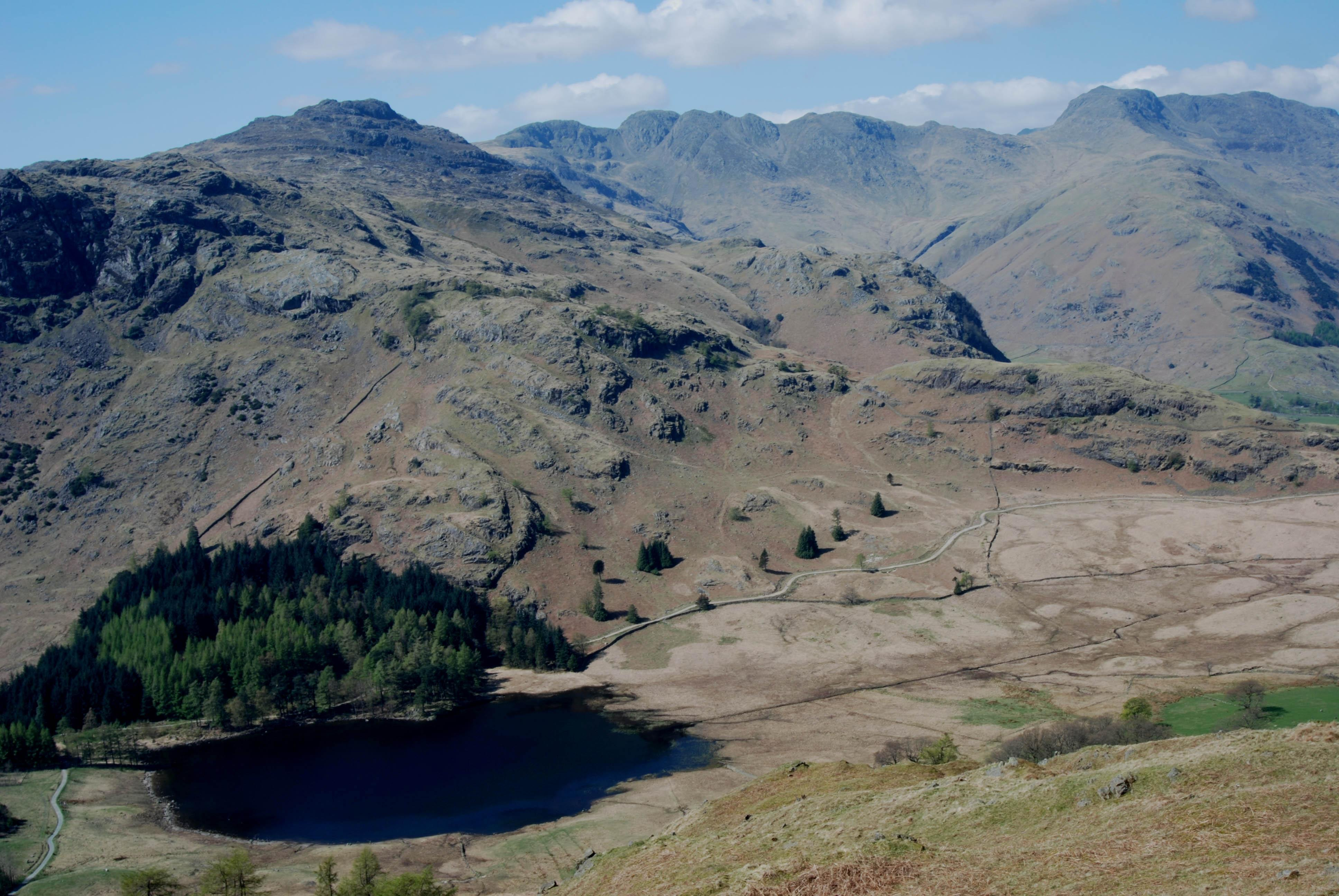
Blea Tarn from Lingmoor Fell

Side Pike seen from the summit ridge
