= Goat's Water =

Lake in Cumbria, England

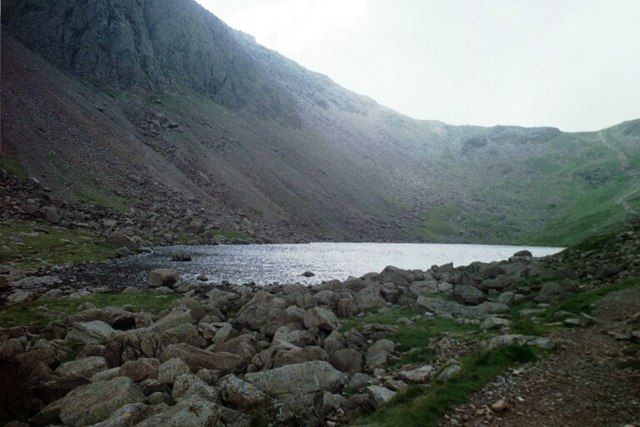

- Location in the Lake District National Park Location in South Lakeland, Cumbria
- Location: Lake District, Cumbria
- Coordinates: 54°22′10″N 3°07′53″W
- Basin countries: United Kingdom

Goat's Water is a small accessible tarn in the English Lake District, located between Dow Crag and The Old Man of Coniston to the Duddon Valley, near the town of Coniston. The tarn is a two-mile walk from the car park above Coniston village. The tarn is a popular summer walking / hiking and rock climbing point and also a popular remote fly fishing location with the water holding a number of small native wild brown trout.
