= Esthwaite Water =

Lake in Cumbria, England

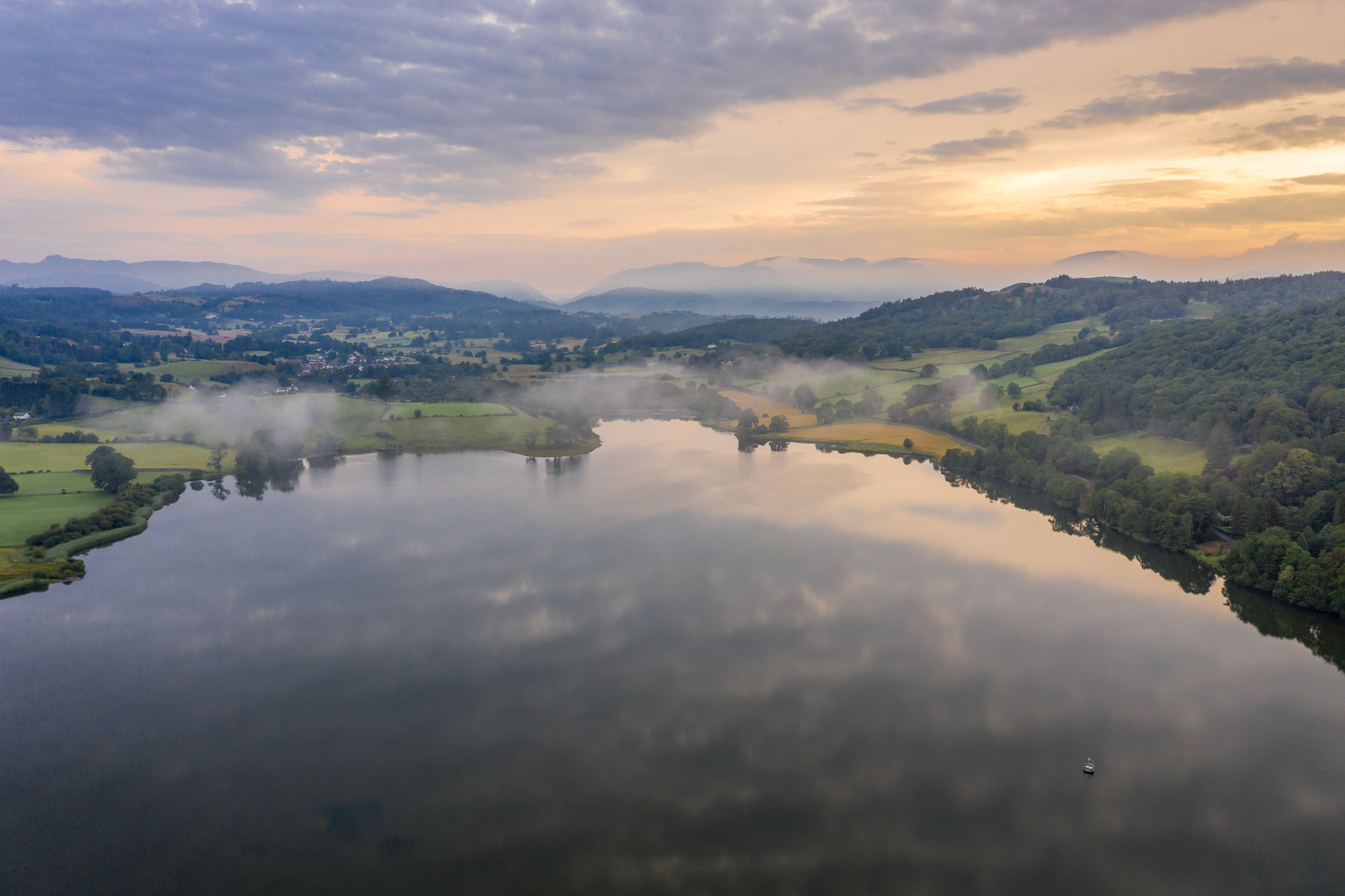
- Esthwaite Water

- Location in the Lake District National Park Location in South Lakeland, Cumbria

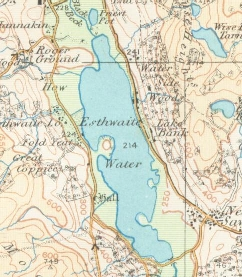
- Map (1925)
- Location: Lake District, Cumbria
- Coordinates: 54°21′N 2°59′W
- Basin countries: United Kingdom
- Surface area: 280 acres (1.1 km^{2})
- Average depth: 6.4 m (21.0 ft)
- Max. depth: 15.5 m (50.9 ft)
- Residence time: 0.26 years
- Surface elevation: 65.3 m (214 ft)
- Islands: 1

Ramsar Wetland
- Designated: 7 November 1991
- Reference no.: 536

Esthwaite Water is one of the smaller and lesser known lakes in the Lake District National Park in Cumbria, England. It is situated between the much larger lakes of Windermere and Coniston Water in the Furness area. To the north is the village of Hawkshead and to the west is Grizedale Forest.

The lake covers around 280 acres (1.1 km^{2}) and is known for its excellent fishing, particularly trout and pike. It has been designated as a site of special scientific interest.

== Toponymy ==
Esthwaite may mean either "the eastern clearing", with Middle English est, probably replacing Old Norse austr 'east', and Norse þveit "clearing", or 'the clearing where ash trees grow', from Norse eski "ash trees, ash copse" (see askr) and again þveit. Derivation from Brittonic *ïstwïth, "bent, curved, flexible, supple" has also been suggested (Welsh ystwyth, see River Ystwyth).

'Water' is Old English wæter, "water" the dominant term for "lake" (cf. Ullswater, Wastwater).

== Wordsworth poems ==
The lake was mentioned as the location where William Wordsworth conversed with a friend in Wordsworth's poem, "Expostulation and Reply," part of Wordsworth's Lyrical Ballads and, in the same collection, it is the location for "Lines Left Upon A Seat In A Yew-Tree." Wordsworth also mentions it in his Prelude in line 267: "Make green peninsulas on Esthwaite's Lake", and also at line 570: "From Esthwaite's neighbouring lake the splitting ice". The poem "The vale of Esthwaite" (1787) was Wordsworth's first effort at sustained composition.

== Ecology ==
Esthwaite is notable as one of the most nutrient rich of the mesotrophic lakes in Cumbria, with large seasonal and inter-annual variations in phosphorus supply. As well as the more common British species of pondweed in the genus Potamogeton, slender naiad (Najas flexilis) is also present.
