= Angle Tarn (Patterdale) =

Lake in Cumbria, England

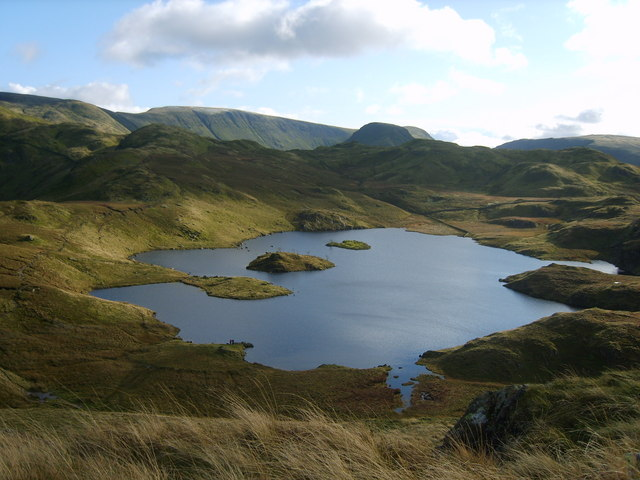
- A full view of the tarn from the north side.

- Location in the Lake District National Park Location in Eden, Cumbria
- Location: Cumbria, England
- Coordinates: 54°31′11″N 2°54′02″W
- Type: Tarn
- Surface area: 5.9 hectares (15 acres)
- Max. depth: 9 m (30 ft)
- Surface elevation: 479 m (1,572 ft)

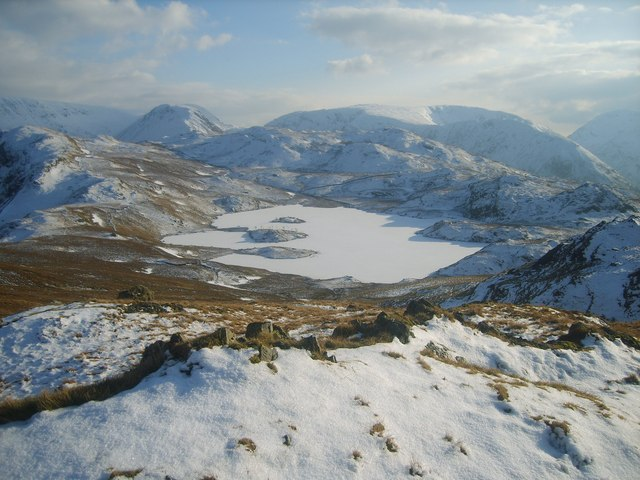
A winter view from the summit of the Angletarn pikes.

Angle Tarn is a tarn in Cumbria, England, within the Lake District National Park, about a mile north-east of Hartsop. Located at an altitude of 479 m (1,572 ft), the lake has an area of 5.9 hectares (15 acres), measures 385 by 260 m (1,263 by 853 ft), with a maximum depth of 9 m (30 ft). The lake is very distinctive in that it resembles a fish hook in shape. It contains two rocky islets and a small broken peninsula. It is located on the Angletarn Pikes, which are named after it.

This should not be confused with Angle Tarn (Langstrath), a smaller lake with the same name about 18.5 km to the northeast near Bowfell, also within the Lake District National Park.

Angle Tarn is a popular spot for overnight wild camping, especially on weekends and in the summer months. The tarn has been described by Alfred Wainwright as among the best of Lakeland tarns.
