= Angle Tarn (Langstrath) =

Tarn in Cumbria, England

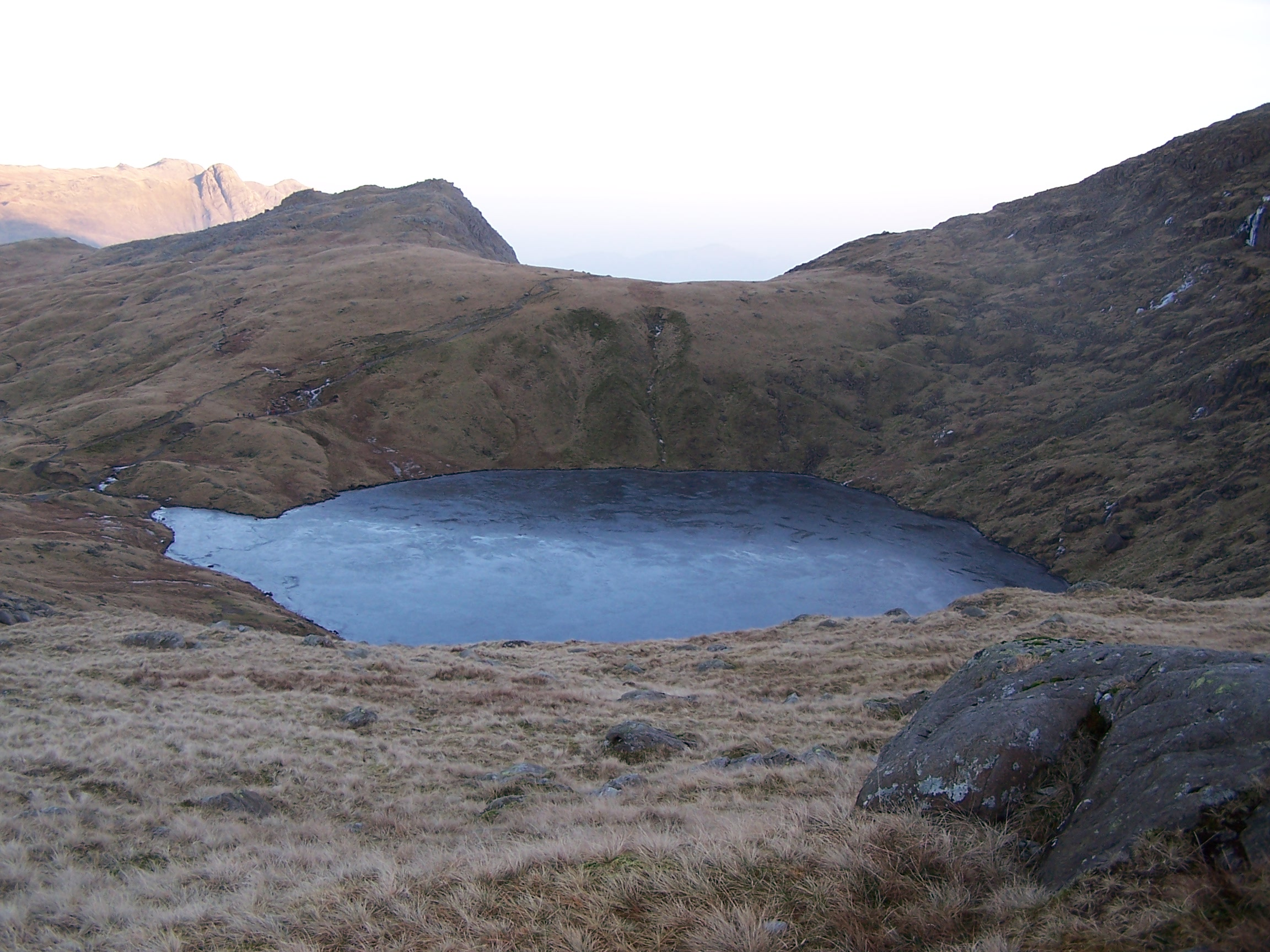
- facing SE, towards the top of Rossett Gill and Langdale

- Location in the Lake District National Park Location in Allerdale, Cumbria
- Location: Lake District
- Coordinates: 54°27′30″N 3°10′00″W
- Type: Tarn
- Basin countries: United Kingdom
- Surface elevation: ~560 m (1,840 ft)

Angle Tarn is a tarn to the north of Bowfell in the English Lake District. It drains into Langstrath Beck.

This should not be confused with Angle Tarn (Patterdale), a larger lake with the same name about 11.5 miles (18.5 km) to the south-west, also within the Lake District National Park.
