= Little Langdale =

Valley in the Lake District, England

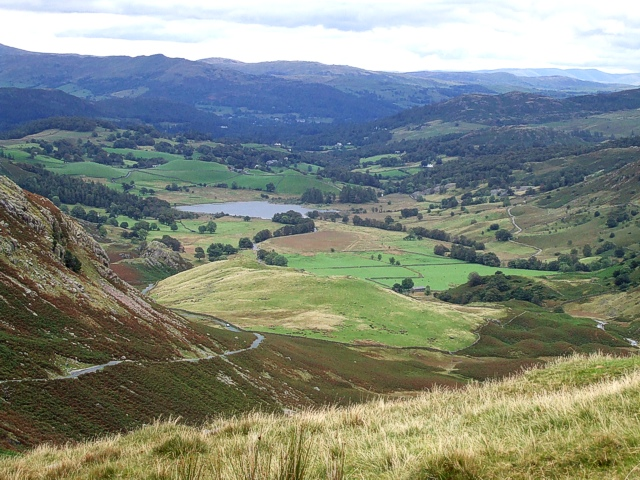
- Little Langdale viewed from Wrynose Pass

- Location in South Lakeland Location within Cumbria
- OS grid reference: NY315033
- Civil parish: Langdale
- Unitary authority: Westmorland and Furness
- Ceremonial county: Cumbria
- Region: North West
- Country: England
- Sovereign state: United Kingdom
- Postcode district: LA22
- Dialling code: 015394
- UK Parliament: Westmorland and Lonsdale

Little Langdale is a valley in the Lake District, England, containing Little Langdale Tarn and a hamlet also called Little Langdale. A second tarn, Blea Tarn, is in a hanging valley between Little Langdale and the larger Great Langdale to the north. Little Langdale is flanked on the south and southwest by Wetherlam and Swirl How, and to the north and northwest by Lingmoor Fell and Pike of Blisco. The valley descends to join with Great Langdale above Elter Water.

== Description ==
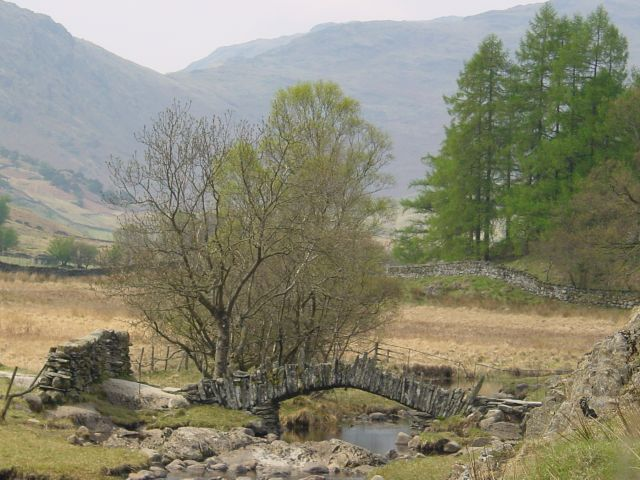
Slater Bridge on the route between Little Langdale and Tilberthwaite

Langdale was previously known as Langdene meaning 'far away wooded valley' and referring to its distance along the flint route from Whitley Bay.

Historically Little Langdale was at the intersection of packhorse routes leading to Ravenglass, Whitehaven, Keswick, Penrith & Carlisle, Ambleside, Hawkshead, and Coniston, Ulverston, Broughton-in-Furness and Barrow in Furness. Slater's Bridge which crosses the River Brathay in three spans supported by a large mid-stream boulder and stone causeways is a 16th-century, slate-built, former packhorse bridge on one of these routes. Today metalled roads from Little Langdale lead west over Wrynose Pass and Hardknott towards Eskdale, northwest by Blea Tarn to Great Langdale, northeast to Elterwater and east to the Skelwith Bridge - Coniston road.

National Cycle Network's Regional Route 37 between Ambleside and Ulverston runs through the valley.

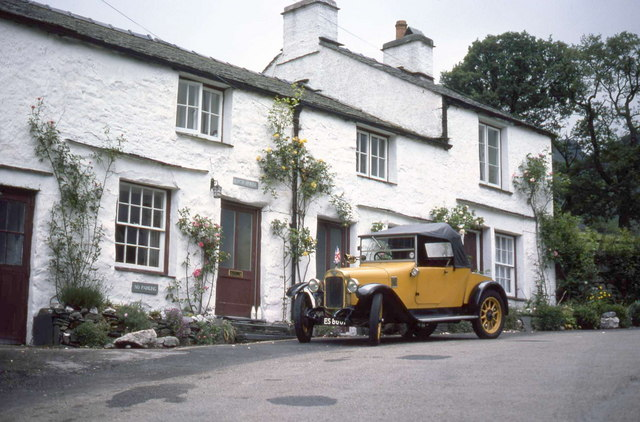
Little Langdale village in 1974

The National Trust owns many farms and areas of land in the valley, many of which date from the 17th century. Other than the farms and houses the village also has an inn. The Three Shires Inn was built in 1872 and is named after the Three Shires Stone two miles (3 km) away. The Inn is the base for the Three Shires Fell Race.

The valley has an annual rainfall of 2,408 millimetres (94.8 in), higher than the Lake District average, which is itself considerably wetter than the UK average. The land in Little Langdale is now mainly used for sheep and cattle farming, although until 1940 at least some of the farmland was ploughed.

The valley was used as a venue in March 2006 for practising a 'mujahidin commando raid' by a group, one of whom was later convicted for terrorism related offences. Little Langdale was the filming location for the 2012 movie Snow White and the Huntsman.

== Mining ==
Little Langdale has been heavily mined and quarried over the last several hundred years particularly for copper and slate although there is little activity there at present. Workings in the vicinity include the extensive slate quarries at Hodge Close, Tilberthwaite and the mines on the southern slopes of Wetherlam. A nearby mine at Hawk Rigg possibly dates from the Elizabethan era and it was reported in 1709 that iron ore was mined in the area. Slate mining particularly boomed in the area in the Victorian Era after the introduction of compressed air drills for making the blast holes, and continued until the introduction of high quality bricks for building.

The rock in the valley is generally Borrowdale tuff and rhyolite with andesite sills with areas of slate, particularly to the south.

=== Cathedral Quarries ===
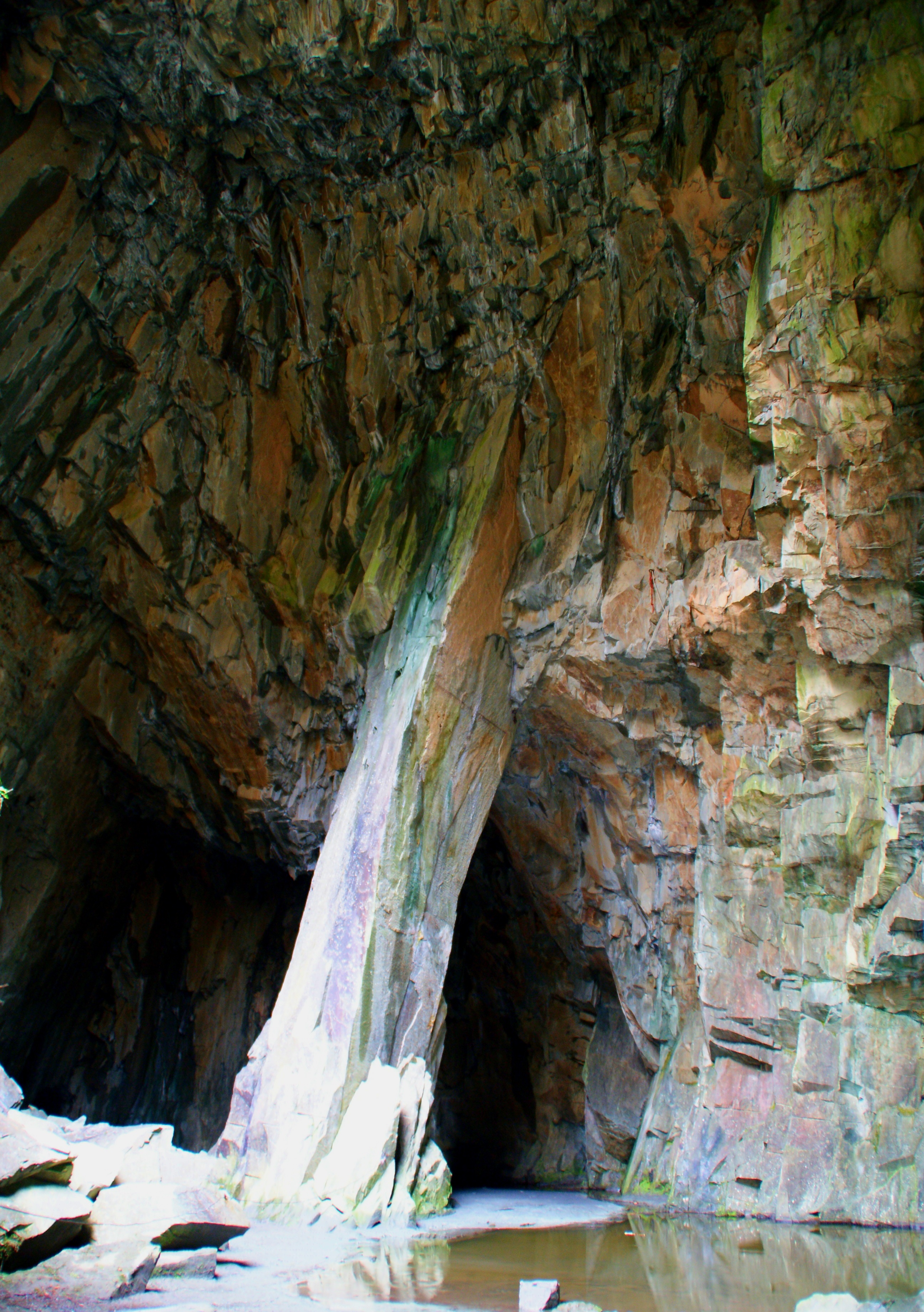
The large pillar in 'The Cathedral' in Cathedral Quarries

Cathedral Quarries (Grid NY308028), a set of disused interlinked quarries for green slate, is above the valley in Atkinson Coppice. The quarry site is now managed by the National Trust and can be entered by the public. It features various chambers and tunnels, including one which is 400 feet (120 m) long. The quarry's main attraction, 'The Cathedral', is a high main chamber 40 feet (12 metres) high, lit by two windows with a huge rock pillar supporting the roof. Some of the quarry smaller chambers are closed off for safety or have already collapsed. The quarry features at least 25 named routes for rock-climbing that are graded Extreme and are 30–40 m long. The spoil heaps from these mines form large banks where silver birch and larch now grow.

=== Greenburn Mine ===
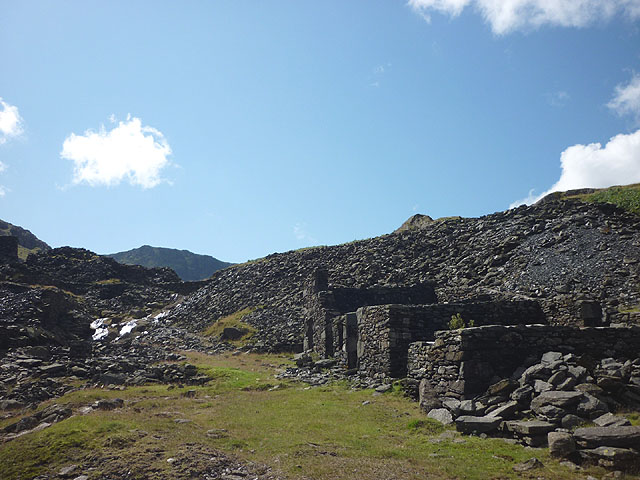
Ruined buildings and spoilheaps at Greenburn mine in summer 2011

Greenburn Mine (also known as New Coniston Mine), close to Greenburn Beck and the disused Greenburn reservoir, is 'widely regarded as the best preserved copper mine in the Lake District.' The mine was mostly worked in the mid-19th century but may have been operated from the late 17th century. It closed in 1865 but later re-opened with activity possibly until 1940. The shafts of the mine reached a depth of 700 ft (210 m) below ground level. The mine workings featured the large Engine Shaft with winding and pumping gear powered by a 9.8 m overshot wheel, various other shafts and adits, a spalling floor, a crushing mill powered by a second water-wheel, an inclined tramways and two precipitation tanks. There are remains of buildings including a smithy, office, two-storey accommodation block, dry store & miners' changing house and explosives store.

At least five copper veins were mined named the Sump, Pave York, Low Gill and Gossan Veins. By 1906 the mine was run by the Greenburn and Tilberthwaite Syndicate who were replaced in 1912 by the Langdale Silver, Lead and Copper Company. The reservoir when built in the 19th century was around 1.6 ha in area but a storm in the winter of 1979-80 caused the dam to burst reducing its height from around 7.5 m to the current 6 m. The effect of the damburst is visible in sediment cores from the downstream Little Langdale Tarn.

== Blea Tarn ==
Blea Tarn
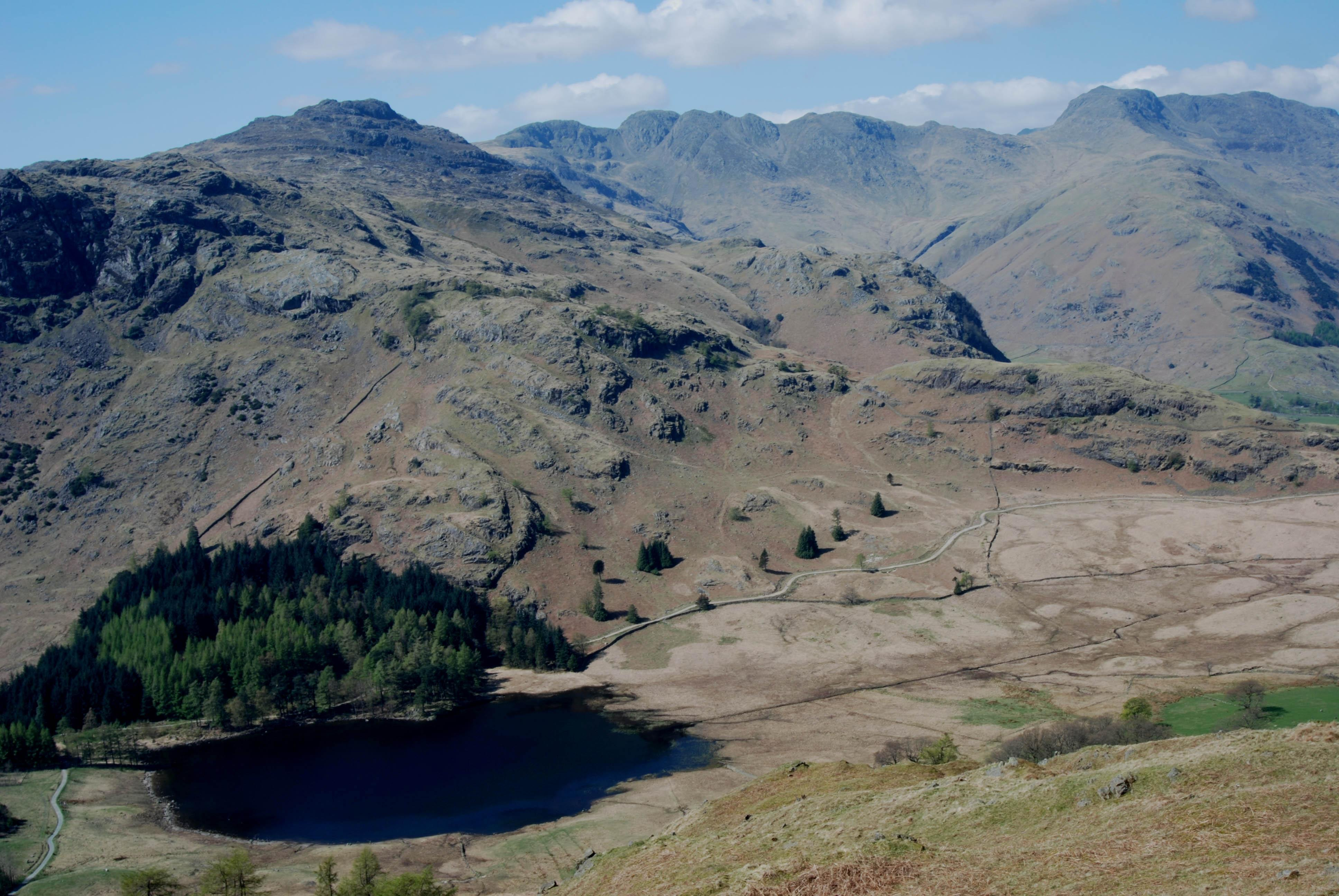
- Blea Tarn with Rakerigg, Blake Rigg and Pike of Blisco from Lingmoor Fell

- Location within Cumbria
- Location: Lake District
- Coordinates: 54°25′49″N 3°5′28″W
- Type: Tarn
- Primary outflows: Bleamoss Beck
- Catchment area: 1.16 km^{2} (0.45 sq mi)
- Surface area: 3.48 ha (8.6 acres)
- Average depth: 7 m (23 ft)
- Max. depth: 8 m (26 ft)
- Surface elevation: 230 m (750 ft) / < 190 m (620 ft) (OS map)

Blea Tarn is situated in a small hanging valley between Great Langdale and Little Langdale. The tarn itself was shaped by glacial ice moving over the col from nearby Great Langdale, but the ice was cut off as the glacier shrank, leaving "moraines very different from those at the head of the main valley". A carpark for twenty vehicles is sited close to the tarn with an all-ability trail leading around the tarn. The tarn is forested on its western shore with rhododendrons also found there, the other shores being grassland. Blea Tarn was characterised in 1969 as being low in nutrients and acidic but not having suffered from fertiliser pollution. Brown trout, perch and pike can all be found in the tarn.

Blea Tarn was designated a SSSI in 1989 because of its importance for palaeo-environmental studies relating to the Devensian and Flandrian times. Pollen analysis from Blea Tarn shows evidence for elm branches being collected as fodder from 3300 BC and forest clearances occurring from around 3000 to 2000 BC corresponding with the dates of the Great Langdale axe factory. All of the land within Blea Tarn SSSI is owned by the National Trust.

The nearby Side Pike SSSI was designated in 1977 as one of the few areas in the British Isles where rock demonstrating subaerial volcanic processes are seen. The ignimbrite and tuff rocks there form part of the Borrowdale Volcanic Group.

=== Farmhouse ===
The farmhouse was built in the 17th century, with a later 19th-century addition, and is currently listed at Grade II. It is a National Trust property rented to a local family and is no longer a working farm. The farmhouse and tarn are both mentioned in Wordsworth's 'The Solitary':

"...to the south
Was one small opening, where a heath-clad ridge
Supplied a boundary less abrupt and close;
A quiet treeless nook, with two green fields,
A liquid pool that glittered in the sun,
and one bare Dwelling; one Abode, no more !
It seemed the home of poverty and toil
Though not of want: the little fields, made green
By husbandry of many thrifty years,
Paid cheerful tribute to the moorland House. ..."

— William Wordsworth, 1814

== Little Langdale Tarn ==
Little Langdale Tarn
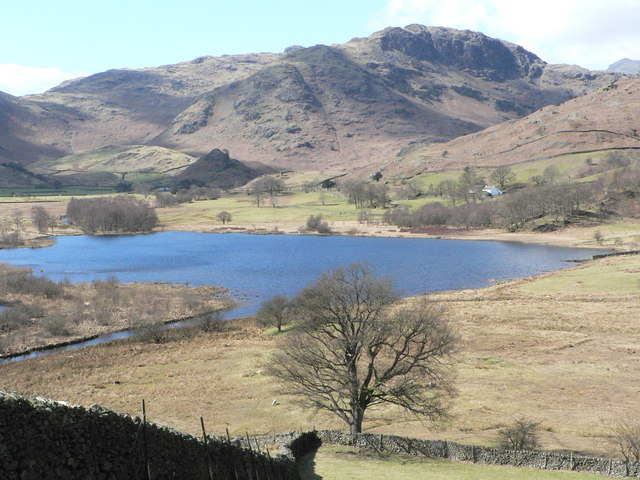

- Location within Cumbria
- Location: NY 309 032
- Coordinates: 54°25′11″N 3°3′58″W
- Type: infilled glacial valley bottom
- Primary inflows: River Brathay & Bleamoss Beck, Greenburn Beck
- Primary outflows: River Brathay
- Catchment area: 12.0 km^{2} (4.6 sq mi)
- Max. length: 375 m (1,230 ft)
- Max. width: 275 m (902 ft)
- Surface area: 0.063 km^{2} (0.024 sq mi), 0.073 km^{2} (0.028 sq mi)
- Average depth: 2.7 m (8 ft 10 in)
- Max. depth: 9.5 m (31 ft)
- Water volume: 2×10^{6} m^{3} (1,600 acre⋅ft) (see note^{1})
- Residence time: 2 days 3.3 days
- Surface elevation: 103 m (338 ft)

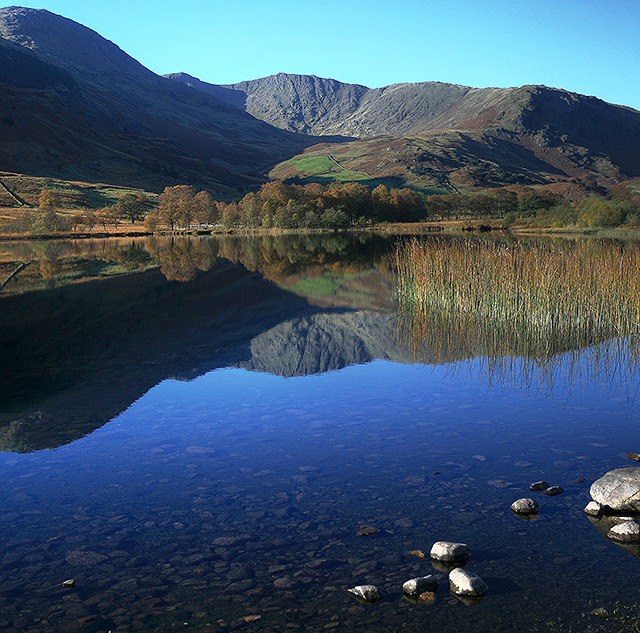
View of Little Langdale Tarn and Swirl How

Little Langdale Tarn is a natural tarn within a marshy area of the valley. The area around the tarn is managed by the National Trust and has no public access. It is typical Southern Cumbrian meso-oligotrophic tarn, whilst not at a particularly high altitude itself it has a mean catchment altitude of 520 metres (1,710 ft)

The tarn and approximately 30 hectares (0.12 sq mi) of its fringing habitats were designated a SSSI in 1965. The habitat types next to the tarn are 'single-species dominant swamp, acid-poor fen, acidic species-rich marshy grassland, hay meadow and wet woodland'. It was surveyed for diatoms in 1984 and 1999, the changes being consistent with the pH of the lake having increased. However, diatoms from sediment cores indicate a decrease in tarn pH from 6.3 to 5.8.

Little Langdale Tarn was several times larger at the end of the last ice age, the lost area having become filled with sediment and resulting in the flat farmland beside the current lake. The catchment area is a sheepfarm of rough grassland and sphagnum bog in the valley bottom and surrounding fellside. Sediment cores taken at the lake show a top layer of brown organic sediment followed by a grey-coloured minerogenic layer rich in copper from the mining activities at Greenburn. There is an obvious increase in the sediment accumulation rate with time, the major source being peat pipes and sheep grazing close to Wrynose Beck, a tributary of the Brathay.

== Fauna and flora ==
The wild fauna of the valley is similar to other nearby valleys and includes the badger, grey squirrel, hare, hedgehog, rabbit, roe deer, red deer, red fox, stoat, weasel, buzzard, cuckoo, house martin, peregrine, raven, ring ouzel, swallow, swift, and slowworm. Rarely the adder, otter and red squirrel are seen. Pine marten, previously rare, are no longer seen in the valley. The tarn shore supports a population of great crested grebe and the dark green fritillary butterfly. Twenty acres of fields around the centre of the hamlet of Little Langdale were designated an SSSI in 1989 as one of the only four remaining meadows of SSSI quality in South Cumbria. The habitat varies from floodplain near the Brathay to higher, dryer haymeadow with both being home to a wide variety of herb, grass and flower species. Grasses found in these meadows include sweet vernal-grass, wood-crane's-bill, common bent, crested dog's tail, red fescue, meadow fescue, Yorkshire-fog, smooth meadow-grass, rough meadow-grass, cock's-foot, soft brome and perennial rye-grass. Perhaps the rarest species found there is the globe-flower.

== History ==
The valley has a long history of inhabitation. A socketed Bronze Age axe was found on Low Fell above Greenburn Beck in 1961 and remains of an Iron Age nucleated hillfort have been found at Castle Howe – a small mound of volcanic rock – including a hut circle and ditches cut into the rock. More recent research disagrees that it was ever a hillfort.

=== The Viking Age ===
The Ting Mound or Thing Moot at Fellfoot Farm is a deliberately terraced mound situated close to the Roman road and other transport routes. It was used as an open-air meeting place for local government. It is believed to have been established by Viking settlers, possibly from the 10th century onward, although it has not been dated archaeologically. The mound is very similar to the Tynwald Mount. Its appearance around the end of the 19th century was described by H.S. Cowper (see note^{2}) and painted by W.G. Collingwood.

=== Medieval and later ===
There are remains of medieval dispersed settlements, with stone-walled houses at Seven Intakes and of a medieval farmstead with a kiln, possibly for corn-drying, close by at Long Intakes. Other possible medieval remains have been found nearby in the valley. Almost all the stone from these buildings has been re-used as dry stone walls.

Many farmhouses in the area date from the 17th century. A chapel is said to have once stood close to the Bield and Tarn at Chapel Mire.

== Famous residents ==
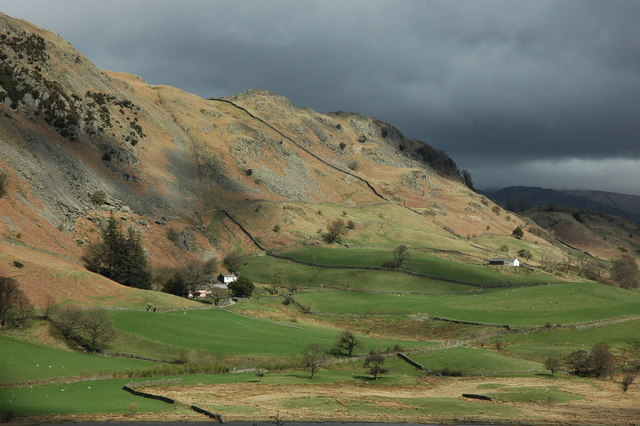
Little Langdale, the Bield and Bield Crag

The Bield (a northern English dialect word for house), a 17th-century farmhouse, was home to the Brazilian sculptor Josefina de Vasconcellos for much of her life and Margaret Cropper (1886–1980), "the most underrated Cumbrian poet of the twentieth century" lived at Bridge End.

Little Langdale was home to the notorious 19th-century smuggler Lanty Slee. Slee had many stills for distilling moonshine whisky hidden in caves and quarries around the area, including one in a cave in Moss Rigg quarry and transported the liquor over Wrynose and Hardknott to Ravenglass. In 1840 Slee built Greenbank Farm in the valley.

== Transport ==
One bus routes serves it run by Stagecoach running to Ambleside.

== Gallery ==
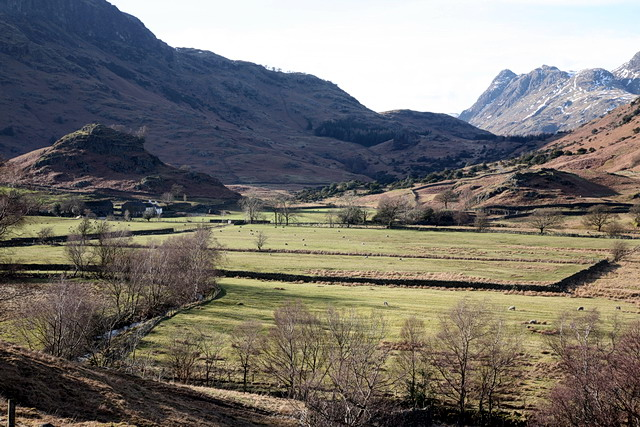
The valley with Castle Howe on the left and the Langdale Pikes on the horizon to the right.

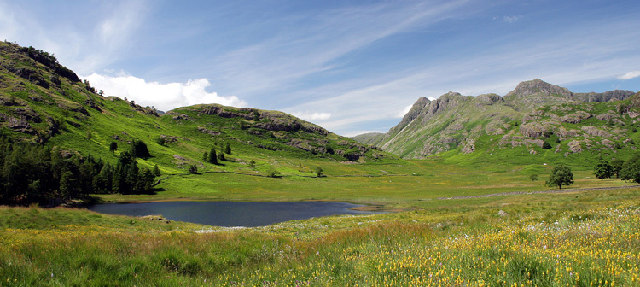
Blea Tarn and the surrounding meadows in July, with the Langdale Pikes in the background.

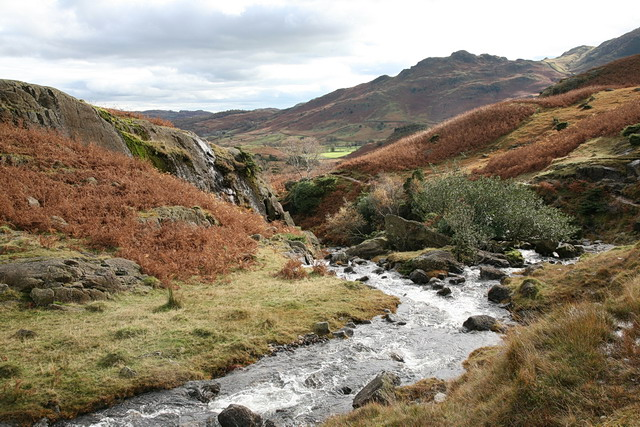
Bleamoss Beck below Blea Tarn.

== See also ==
- Listed buildings in Coniston, Cumbria

== Notes ==
1.There appears to be a factor of 10 discrepancy between this and area multiplied by average depth.
2.It consists of an oblong quadrangular platform (the E. side of which is 75 ft., the W. 70 ft., the N. 21 ft., and the S. 19 ft.), surrounded and approached by stepped platforms all of which are of the uniform breadth of 14 ft. On the N. side there are two of these, on the W. three, and on the S. four. The east side has apparently had the same number as the west, but they are partly destroyed or obliterated by a row of ancient yew trees, and by the farm buildings.

The bank of the summit is in places indistinct, as on the east side, especially at the north end. The surrounding terraces are best marked at the south-west corner, where the natural level of the ground is lowest, and here the lowest bank seems about 4 feet high, the next about 2 ft., and the total height at this corner from 10 to 12 ft. The banks seem chiefly formed of earth, but at the south-east corner, where they are partially destroyed, they are stony. The ground upon which the mound is placed rises to the north, and falls to the south; but the terraces and banks of the mound itself rise gently to the south.
