= Watendlath =

Hamlet in Cumbria, England

Coordinates: 54.537222°N 3.121389°W

- Hamlet
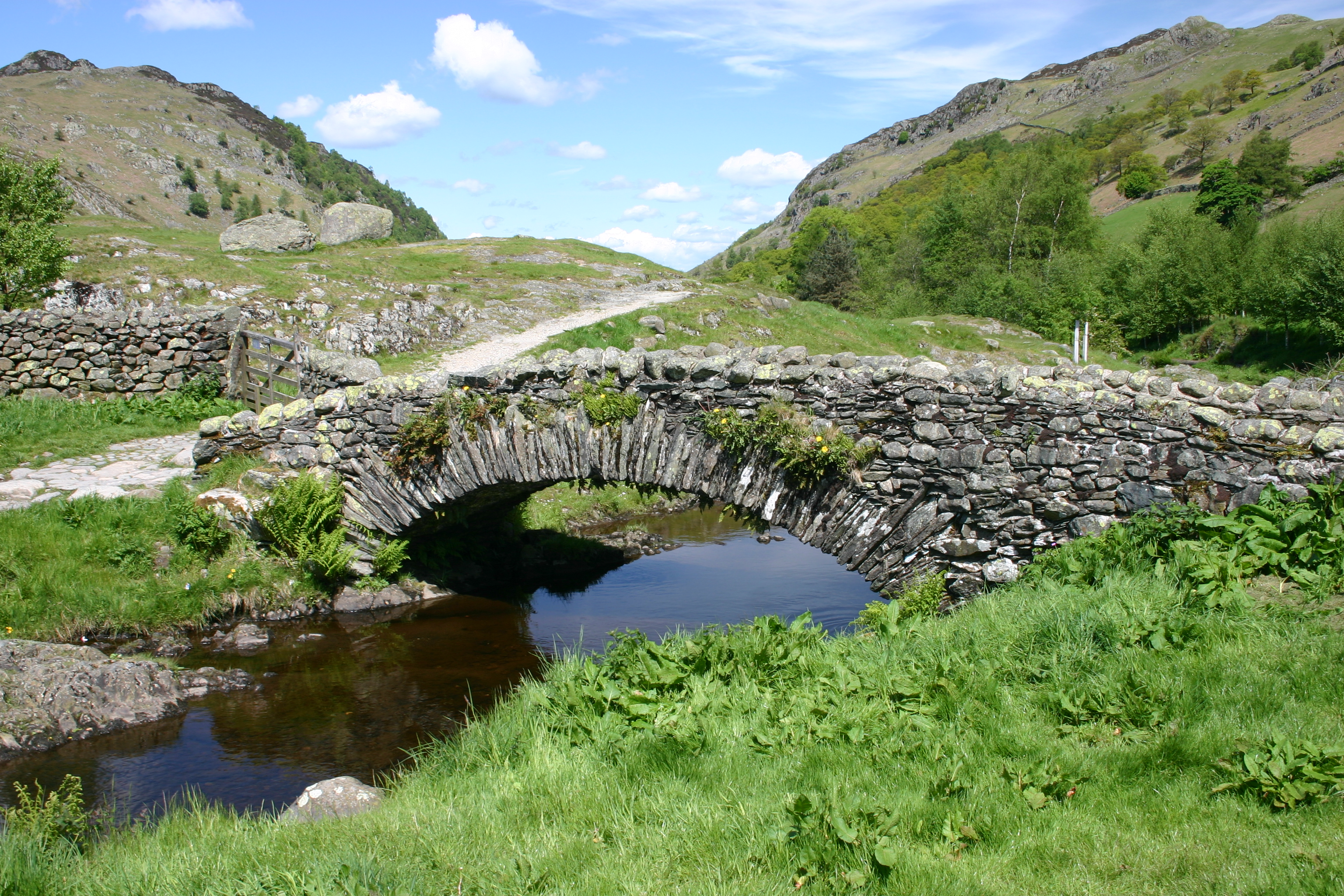
- Packhorse bridge at Watendlath

- Location in the former Allerdale district Location within Cumbria
- OS grid reference: NY274163
- Civil parish: Borrowdale
- Unitary authority: Cumberland
- Ceremonial county: Cumbria
- Region: North West
- Country: England
- Sovereign state: United Kingdom
- Post town: KESWICK
- Postcode district: CA12
- Dialling code: 017687
- Police: Cumbria
- Fire: Cumbria
- Ambulance: North West
- UK Parliament: Penrith and Solway

Watendlath is a hamlet and tarn (a small lake) in the Lake District in the English county of Cumbria, historically part of Cumberland,

Watendlath is owned by the National Trust and sits high between the Borrowdale and Thirlmere valleys at 863 feet (263 m) above sea level.

== Watendlath Tarn ==
Watendlath Tarn is fed by Bleatarn Gill from Blea Tarn, 700 feet (210 m) above, below Bell Crags. Water from Watendlath Tarn flows into the beck of the same name and eventually feeds Lodore Falls, and ends up in Derwent Water.

The tarn is seven acres (2.8 hectares) in size, with a maximum depth of 56 feet (17 m). It was given to the National Trust by Queen Victoria's daughter, Princess Louise, in memory of her brother, King Edward VII.

== Governance ==
Watendlath is within the Penrith and Solway UK parliamentary constituency.

Watendlath has its own Parish Council; Borrowdale Parish Council.

== Farm ==
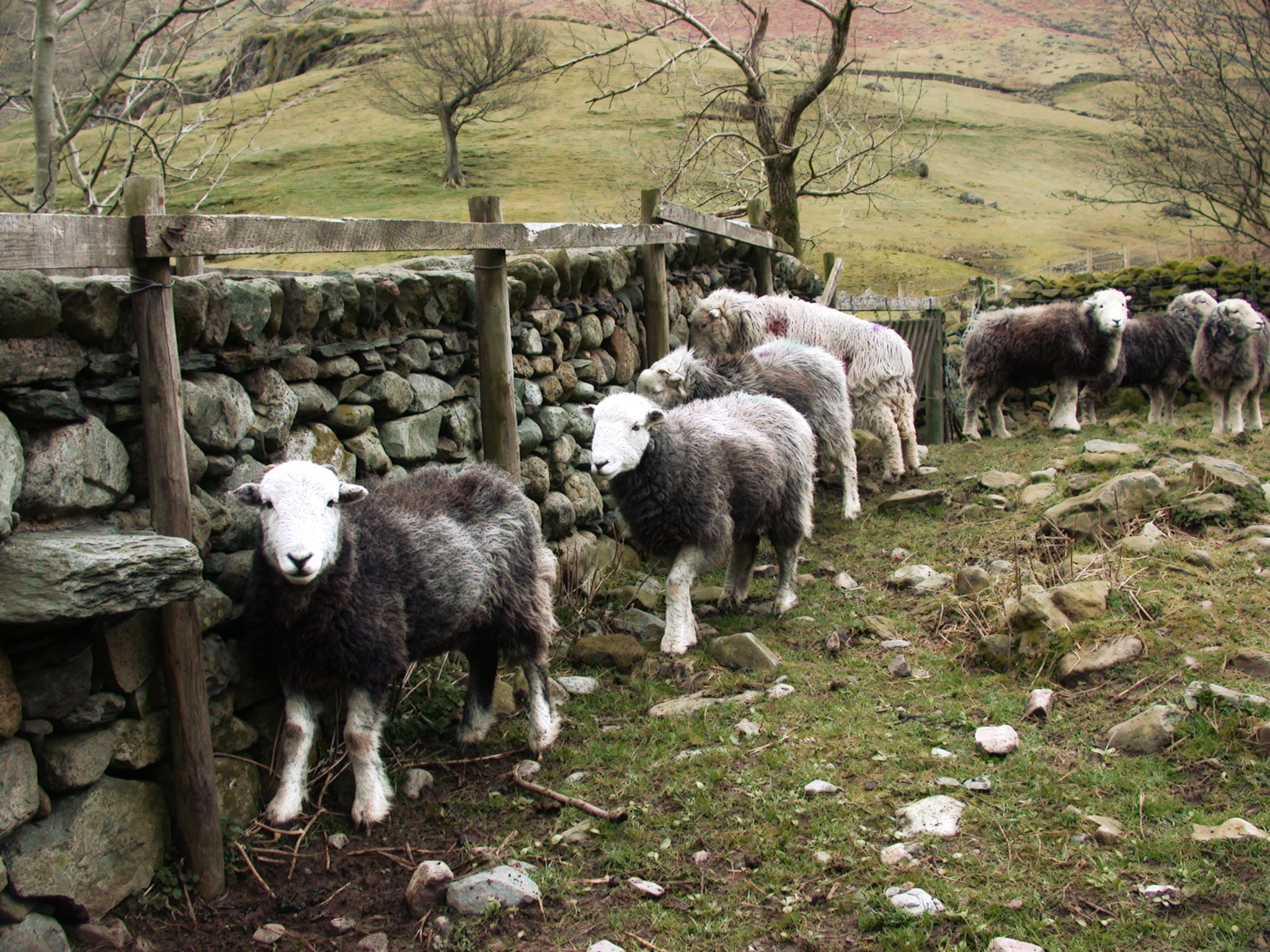
Herdwick sheep

The traditional Lakeland farm in Watendlath is rented out by the National Trust and, as is the case with Lakeland farms owned by the Trust, the herd of Herdwick sheep are owned by the Trust and not the farmer, changing hands with each tenant. This is part of the National Trust's policy aimed at ensuring this rare breed's survival.

Fold Head Farm house was used by Sir Hugh Walpole as the fictional home of Judith Paris in his Herries Saga of four novels published in the early 1930s

== Watendlath in poetry ==
Edmund Casson's poem The Wise Kings of Borrowdale mentions:

Watendlath's quiet nook.
A farm is there, and a slated barn,
And a waterfall, and a pebbly tarn;
And all the way to High Lodore
The banks of the beck are painted o'er
With red herb-willow and red loose-strife.

== Packhorse bridge ==
One of the features of Watendlath is Ashness Bridge, a traditional packhorse bridge, "perhaps the best-known and most photographed packhorse bridge in the whole of England".

In 2015 Watendlath's packhorse bridge was named 4th best bridge in England on which to play Poohsticks.

== Access by road ==
Watendlath is reached by a minor road from the Borrowdale road (B5289). The single track unmarked road winds its way up over Ashness Bridge, which is a traditional stone-built bridge and a very famous landmark. Motorists encountering any traffic coming in the opposite direction on the single track road must use the passing places that are provided. Near the bridge is a cairn to the Lakeland fell-runner Robert Graham, who in 1932 set a Lakeland 24-hour record of 42 tops, which was not equalled for 28 years.

== Dora Carrington ==
One famous painting of Watendlath is by Dora Carrington and this picture hangs in the Tate Gallery.

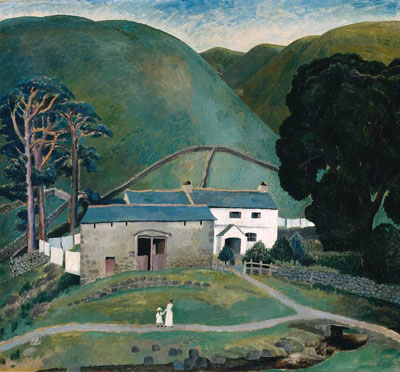

During the period 1917–1921 Carrington's subjects were mostly intimate portraits and landscapes. The painting depicts Watendlath Farm, where the newly-wed Carrington spent a summer holiday with her husband and their friends in 1921. Among the guests was her husband's friend, Gerald Brenan, with whom she developed a mutual attraction. The identity of the two figures in white is not known.

== Toponymy ==
The name came from Old Norse vatn-endi-hlaða = "water-end-barn".

== See also ==
- Listed buildings in Borrowdale
