= Scafells =

Range of fells in Cumbria, England

- View of the Scafells from Wastwater

Highest point
- Elevation: max. 978 m (3,209 ft) at Scafell Pike
- Coordinates: 54.471°N 3.144°W

Geography
- Location within the Lake District Location within England Location within the United Kingdom
- Location: Cumbria, England
- Parent range: Cumbrian Mountains

Geology
- Rock age: -
- Mountain type: Caldera
- Last eruption: +400 MYA

The Scafells, or Scafell Massif, are a range of fells in the Cumbrian Mountains of England, made up of the remains of a caldera volcano. Fells in the range include Broad Crag, Ill Crag, Scafell, and Scafell Pike, England's tallest mountain. Great End, Lingmell and Slight Side are also usually included within the definition. These hills form part of the Southern Fells.

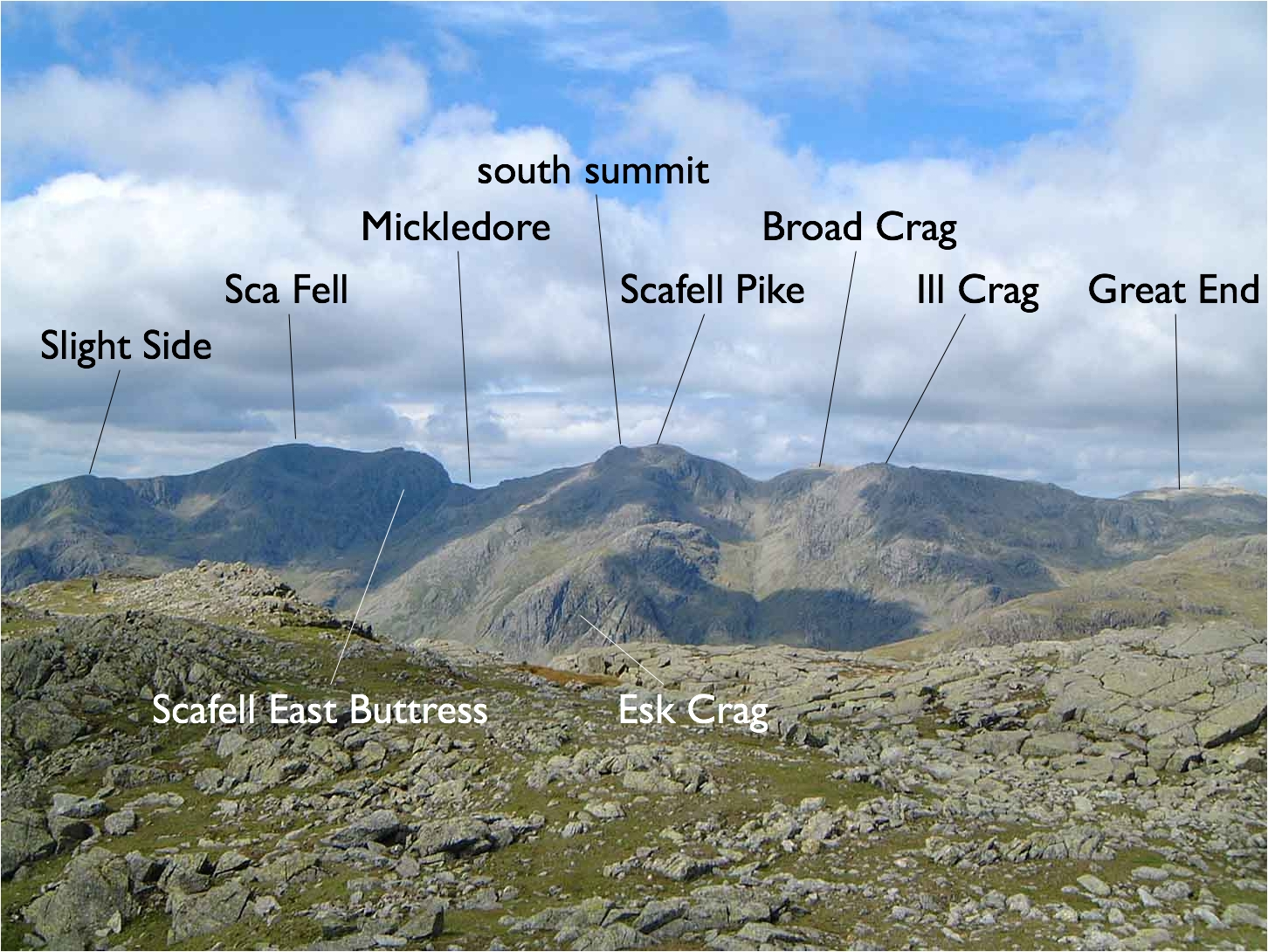
The Scafell range as seen looking west from Crinkle Crags. (Interactive labels.)

== Geology ==
Geologically, parts of the Scafell massif are the remnants of a volcano that erupted in the Ordovician period over 400 million years ago. This volcano, geologically described as a caldera and an "inverse stratovolcano", as well as all other volcanoes of the Lake District, are long since extinct.

The volcano is an example of a piecemeal caldera whose collapse, in contrast with a wholesale piston-like subsidence, occurred in a piece-by-piece fashion along faults and whose measurements suggest formation from an eruption of a VEI-7 magnitude, comparable to the Minoan eruption at Santorini in the Greek Aegean in c. 1600 BCE. The Scafell dacite, between Little Narrowcove and Aaron Crags, is a lava dome formed during the last stages of volcanic activity at Scafell massif.

== English Munros ==
An English Munro (or Furth) is a mountain summit that exceeds 3,000 feet (914.4 m) and has a prominence of more than 30 metres (98 feet). In England there are six peaks that meet those criteria and four of those are part of the Scafell Massif. (Note: In Scotland there are 442 peaks that meet those criteria. See Lists of mountains and hills in the British Isles > Murdos.)

Peak	Height (m)	Prominence (m)	OSI Grid Reference	Highest Class
Scafell Pike‡	978	912	NY215072	P600
Sca Fell	964	133	NY207065	Hewitt
Ill Crag	935	57	NY223073	Hewitt
Broad Crag	934	52	NY218075	Hewitt

(‡) Have the prominence of over 150 metres (492 ft) to qualify as a "Real Munro".

== Protected area ==
The Scafells are situated within a Site of Special Scientific Interest (SSSI) designated in 1988 called Scafell Pikes. This protected area includes Seathwaite Fell, Great Slack, Great End, Long Pike, III Crag, Symonds Knott, Slight Side and Scafell Pike and the area of this SSSI is 1102 hectares. This area is protected because of the lichens found in the summit boulder field.

=== Details of Scafell Pikes SSSI ===
The summit boulder field is the highest in England and is covered in shattered rock debris. Lichens on these rocks include species from Rhizocarpon, Umbilicaria, Sphaerophorus, Lecidea and Cladonia (species of interest include Rhizocarpon geographicum, Umbilicaria cylindrica and Sphaerophorus fragilis). The moss species Rhacomitrium lanuginosum and the beetle Nebria nivalis have also been recorded here.

The crags of Great End have alpine herbs such as roseroot, alpine cinquefoil, alpine saw-wort and bearberry, as well as juniper. To the north of Scafell Pike herbs on rock ledges include mountain sorrel, alpine lady's mantle, alpine meadow-rue, starry saxifrage, purple saxifrage, mossy saxifrage and mountain saxifrage. The ferns lemon-scented fern (Oreopteris), beech fern, oak fern, scaly male-fern and broad buckler fern have also been recorded here.

North of Great End is Sprinkling Tarn and Styhead Tarn that have aquatic plants including intermediate water-starwort, quillwort, shoreweed, floating bur-reed and awlwort. Water lobellia is found in Styhead Tarn.

The wet habitats of Seathwaite Fell support populations of a butterfly called the small mountain ringlet.

=== Land ownership in Scafell Pikes SSSI ===
All of the land within Scafell Pikes SSSI is owned by the National Trust.

== Accident black spots ==
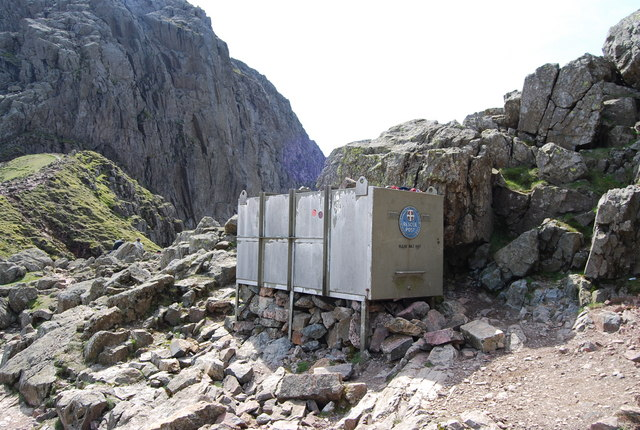
Mountain rescue post, Mickledore

The traverse between England's two highest summits via Mickledore col requires considerable care and caution. The route via Broad Stand is best avoided because it is dangerous. There is a safer but longer route available via Foxes Tarn.

== Gallery ==
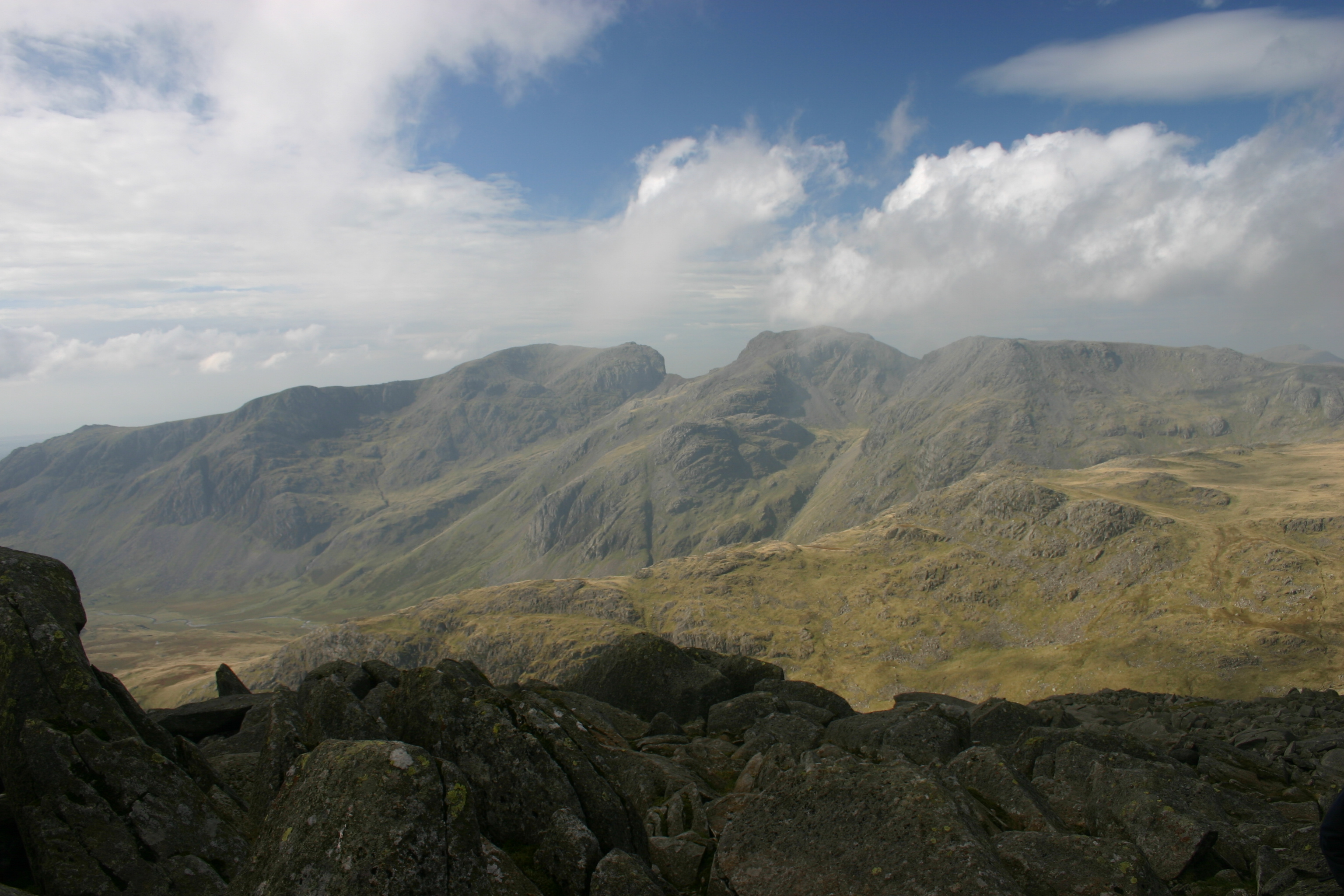
Scafell massif from Bowfell
