= Lingmell =

Mountain in the English Lake District, Cumbria, England

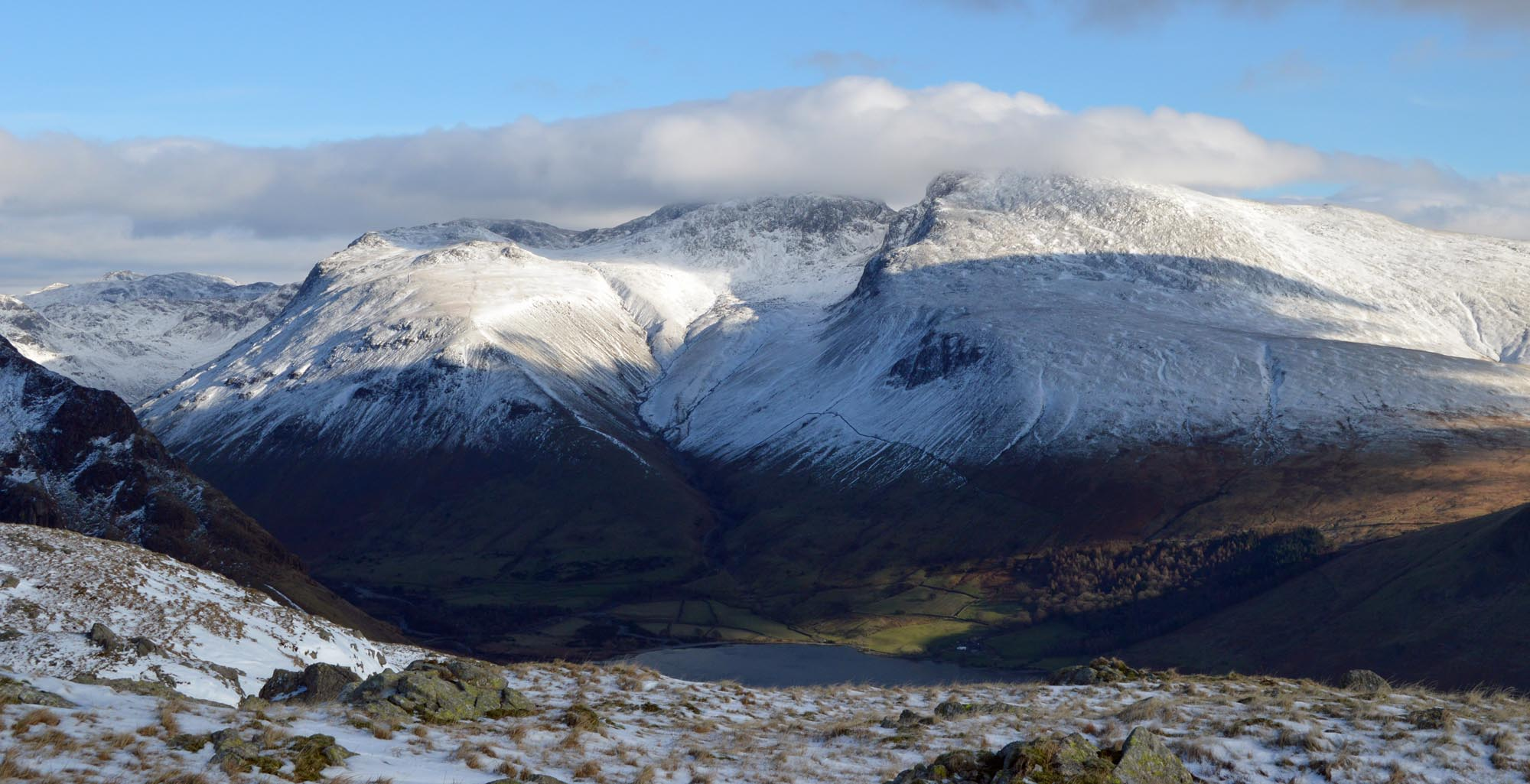
- Scafell massif, showing Lingmell on left with summit clear of cloud

Highest point
- Elevation: 807 m (2,648 ft)
- Prominence: c.. 72 m (236 feet)
- Parent peak: Scafell Pike
- Listing: Hewitt, Wainwright, Nuttall
- Coordinates: 54°27′44″N 3°13′18″W

Geography
- Location within the Lake District Location within the former Borough of Copeland
- Location: Cumbria, England
- Parent range: Lake District, Southern Fells
- OS grid: NY209081
- Topo map: OS Landrangers 89, 90, Explorer OL6

Lingmell is a fell in the English Lake District, standing above the village of Wasdale Head. It is an outlier on the north-west flank of Scafell Pike, England’s highest mountain.

== Topography ==
Although standing in the shadow of its taller parent, Lingmell is very much a separate entity. In the manner of many fells it displays two contrasting aspects. The southern and western slopes – although steep – are smooth and rounded, while the northern and eastern faces fall as crags directly from the summit. The northern crag drops for 1,000 feet (300 metres) toward the valley floor, with a further 1,000 feet (300 metres) of scree below.

The connection to Scafell Pike is via Lingmell Col, a grassy depression at 734 metres (2,408 ft). Flowing west from the col is Lingmell Gill, descending through Hollow Stones to Brackenclose at the head of Wast Water. To the east of Lingmell Col runs Piers Gill, a stream descending from high on the Scafells. This flows right around the northern perimeter of Lingmell, finally entering Wast Water as Lingmell Beck, only a short distance from the entry point of Lingmell Gill. These two streams which girdle the fell both run through wide boulder strewn courses, evidence of flash flooding and the endless fall of rocks from the upper slopes. Lingmell sends out a long shoulder westward between the two streams. The southern face of this, riven with scree on its slow tumbling journey into Lingmell Gill is named Lingmell Scars. At the top of the shoulder are the many outcrops of Goat Crags.

Piers Gill runs below the eastern crags of Lingmell in a deep ravine, one of the finest in the District. Averaging about 9 metres (30 ft), but much deeper in places, it pursues an L-shaped course down the fellside before emerging from its cutting to merge with Greta Gill. The scenery of Piers Gill and Lingmell from the Corridor Route ascent of Scafell Pike is remarkable and a faint path follows the eastern bank of the gill giving even more intimate views. The ravine appears to offer access at either end, but ordinary walkers should on no account attempt to follow it. Crossings of the ravine should also be considered impossible for the average hiker.

== Geology ==
Lava flows of Scafell Dacite cross the fell, interspersed with andesite and hybridized andesite porphyry.

== Summit ==
The summit of Lingmell is directly above the crags on the eastern side, a fine cairn having been constructed to replace the thin column described by Wainwright in the 1960s. This is one of the finest vantage points for Great Gable, a little over a mile to the north. Particularly impressive is the view of the Great Napes, one of the nurseries of the sport of rock climbing. Alfred Wainwright wrote in his Pictorial Guide to the Lakeland Fells of: ‘…the surprising aspect of Great Gable across the deep gulf of Lingmell Beck…the eye being deceived into seeing its half-mile of height as quite perpendicular’. From the summit of Goat Crags to the south is an equally astounding view of Scafell Crag, another early climbers’ playground on Scafell.

== Ascents ==
Lingmell is often bypassed by walkers aiming for Scafell Pike and Scafell, but it is a rewarding ascent in its own right, or as part of a circuit of the Scafell range. There are two ascent routes from Wasdale Head, via Brown Tongue or Piers Gill, but the latter route provides better walking and impressive views of the Piers Gill ravine and Great Gable. The ascent from Borrowdale and Styhead Tarn is made by the Corridor Route.

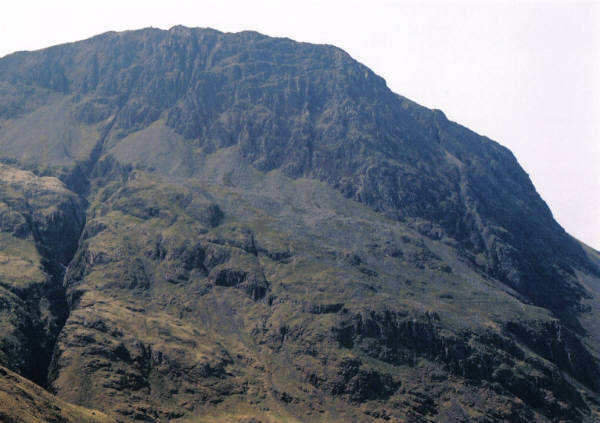
View from Corridor route showing Piers Ghyll on left.
