= Sprinkling Tarn =

Upland lake in Cumbria, England

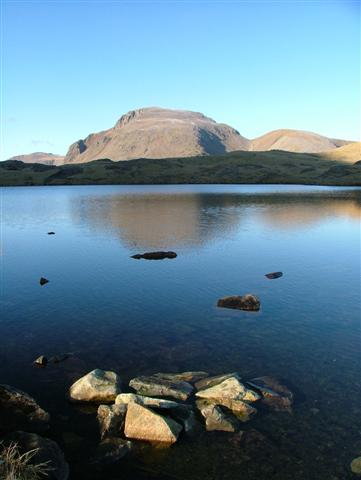

- Location in the Lake District National Park Location in Allerdale, Cumbria
- Location: Lake District
- Coordinates: 54.471°N 3.193°W
- Basin countries: United Kingdom
- Islands: 0

Sprinkling Tarn is a body of water at the foot of Great End, in the Southern Fells in Lake District, 3 kilometres (1.9 mi) from Seathwaite, Cumbria, England. It is noted for its trout and an introduced rare fish, vendace. Formerly known also as Sparkling Tarn. It is known as the wettest place of England with an annual precipitation of over 5 metres (16 ft).

Sprinkling tarn has aquatic plants including intermediate water-starwort, quillwort, shoreweed, floating bur-reed and awlwort and this lake is within the Site of Special Scientific Interest called Scafell Pikes (see Scafells).
