= Styhead Tarn =

Lake in Cumbria, England

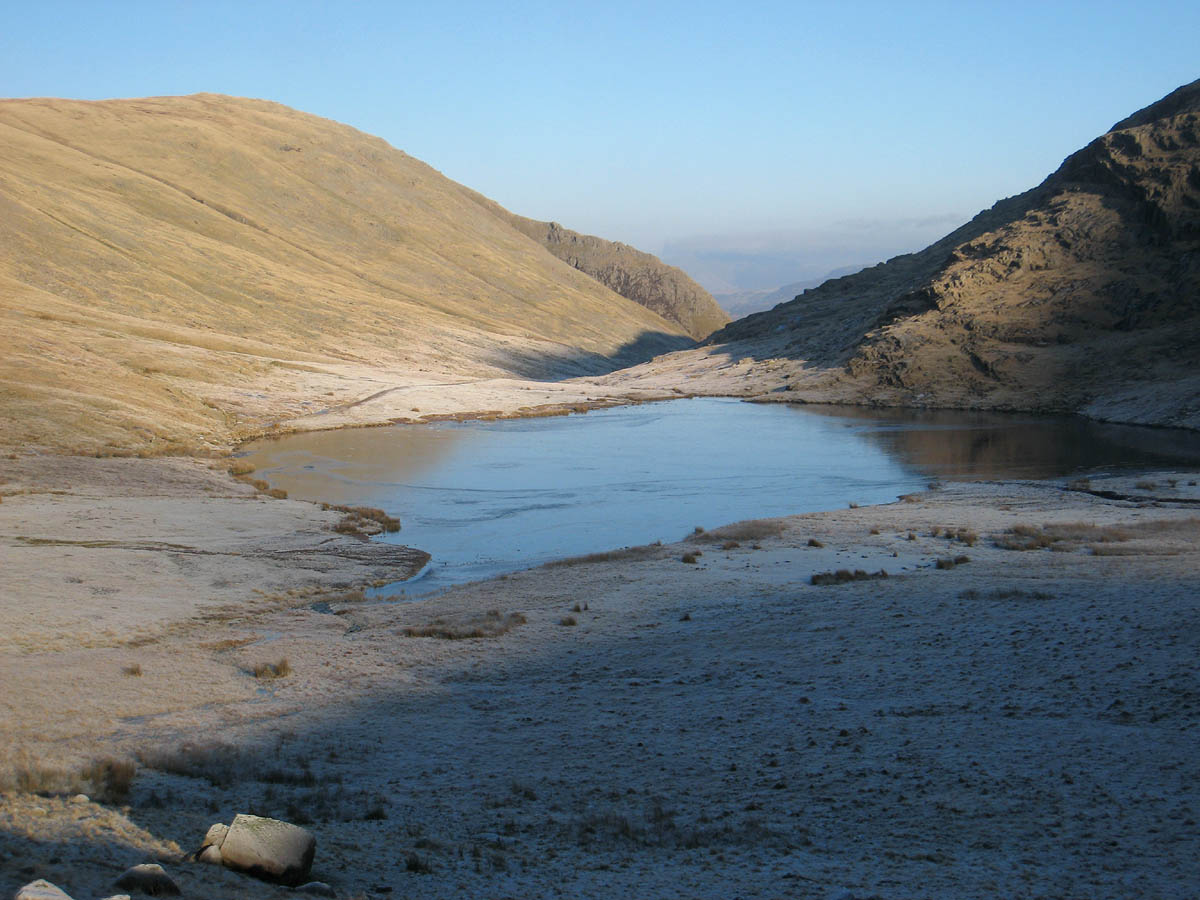
- Styhead Tarn, looking across towards Borrowdale

- Location in the Lake District National Park Location in Allerdale, Cumbria
- Location: Cumbria
- Coordinates: 54°28′41″N 3°12′10″W
- Primary outflows: Styhead Gill
- Basin countries: United Kingdom

Styhead Tarn is a tarn in the English Lake District, near the top of the Sty Head pass at the head of Borrowdale. It is on the route from Wasdale to Borrowdale and is, therefore, a well-visited point in the Lake District. It is also passed by walkers ascending Scafell Pike from Borrowdale via the Corridor Route. It is permissible to fish the tarn, which contains wild brown trout.

The Styhead Gill is the tarn's outlet which, flows into the River Derwent.

Styhead tarn has aquatic plants including intermediate water-starwort, quillwort, shoreweed, floating bur-reed and awlwort and this lake is within the Site of Special Scientific Interest called Scafell Pikes (see Scafells).

== Rainfall ==
Although no official confirmation yet exists, Styhead Tarn is believed to hold the English record for the highest monthly rainfall total, at about 1430 mm in November 2009.
