= Slight Side =

Mountain in the English Lake District, Cumbria, England

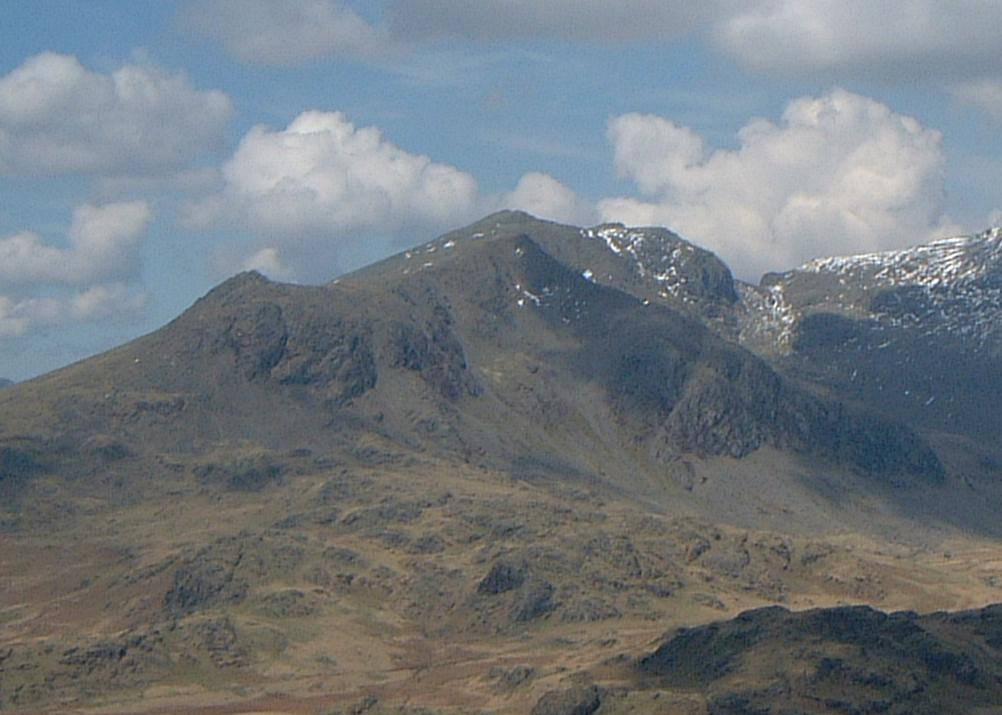
- Slight Side (left of picture) seen from the south-east.

Highest point
- Elevation: 762 m (2,500 ft)
- Prominence: 14 m (46 ft)
- Parent peak: Sca Fell
- Listing: Wainwright
- Coordinates: 54°26′03″N 3°13′15″W

Geography
- Location within the Lake District Location within the former Borough of Copeland
- Location: Cumbria, England
- Parent range: Lake District, Southern Fells
- OS grid: NY209050
- Topo map: OS Landranger 89 OS Explorer OL6

Slight Side is a fell in the English Lake District it stands 25 kilometres (16 miles) east southeast of the town of Whitehaven and reaches a height of 762 metres (2,499 ft). Slight Side lies at the south western edge of the Scafell Massif, a four-kilometre-long (2 1/2-mile) crescent of high ground which includes the highest ground in England. The fells names derives from the Old Norse language and means "The mountain shieling with the level pastures", it is a combination of the Norse words "sletta" and "saetr". With a shieling meaning a shepherds hut or a mountain pasture used in the summer.

== Topography ==
When viewed from the valley of Eskdale the fell is seen as a distinct peak but in reality it is just the terminal point on Scafell’s southern ridge before it descends steeply to Eskdale. It only has 14 metres (46 ft) of topographic prominence between itself and Scafell (the col is at 748 metres; 2,454 ft) and therefore Slight Side narrowly fails to qualify as a Nuttall hill or a Hewitt. It was left to Alfred Wainwright to give Slight Side the status of a separate fell in his Pictorial Guide to the Lakeland Fells.

Slight Side is steep and craggy on all sides except to the north where the ridge runs to Scafell. The eastern flank falls to the valley of the infant River Esk while the slopes to the west descend across Eskdale Fell towards Burnmoor Tarn. Horn Crag stands to the south of the summit overlooking Eskdale. Just under a kilometre to the north past the 748m col is Long Green which is the summit of Cam Spout crags. When viewed from a distance (see picture) or even when walking, Long Green can be mistaken for the summit of Slight Side. Cam Spout Crag is a rock climbing location, although not a particularly busy one, with 12 climbs including Cam Spout Buttress and Eskdale Grooves.

== Ascents ==
One possible ascent of Slight Side is from Eskdale and this is often completed in conjunction with Scafell, and possibly Scafell Pike as well. The ascent may be started at the hamlet of Boot. It takes the path which passes Eel Tarn and Stony Tarn before crossing bouldery ground to climb the broad ridge to the summit. Scafell stands two kilometres (1 1/4 miles) to the north and is reached by a vertical ascent of 230 metres (750 ft). The fell can be bagged with little effort while descending to Eskdale from Scafell by the southern ridge.

== Summit ==
The summit of Slight Side features prominent rock formations and is included by Alfred Wainwright in his selection of the six best summits in the Lake District, where he describes it as "rocky, shapely, well defined and can be attained only by a rough final scramble." The summit offers expansive views westward toward the Irish Sea.
