= Great End =

Mountain in the Lake District, England

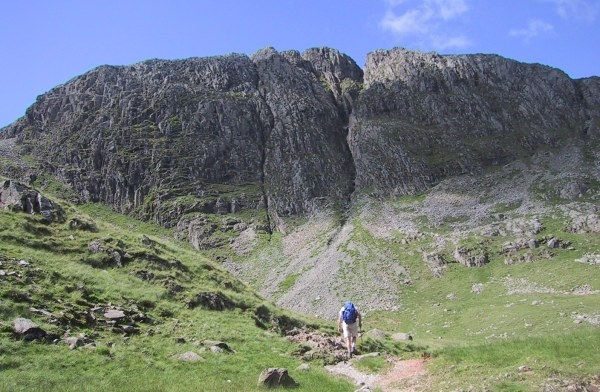
- Great End from the top of Grains Gill

Highest point
- Elevation: 910 m (2,990 ft)
- Prominence: 56 m (184 ft)
- Parent peak: Ill Crag
- Listing: Hewitt, Wainwright, Nuttall
- Coordinates: 54°27′50″N 3°11′38″W

Geography
- Location within the Lake District Location within the former Allerdale Borough Location within the former Borough of Copeland
- Location: Cumbria, England
- Parent range: Lake District, Southern Fells
- OS grid: NY226084
- Topo map: OS Landrangers 89, 90, Explorer OL6

Listed summits of Great End
Name	Grid ref	Height	Status
Round How	NY218081	741 m (2,431 ft)	Nuttall

Great End is the most northerly mountain in the Scafell chain, in the English Lake District. From the south it is simply a lump continuing this chain. From the north, however, it appears as an immense mountain, with an imposing north face rising above Sprinkling Tarn (lake). This is a popular location for wild camping, and the north face attracts many climbers.

Alfred Wainwright wrote of Great End in his Pictorial Guide to the Lakeland Fells: "This is the true Lakeland of the fellwalker, the sort of terrain that calls him back time after time, the sort of memory that haunts his long winter exile. It is not the pretty places – the flowery lanes of Grasmere or Derwentwater's wooded bays – that keep him restless in his bed; it is the magnificent ones. Places like Great End..."

== Topography ==
The imposing north-eastern cliffs, riven by gullies, rise some 600 ft (180 m) from the Esk Hause path. Their orientation ensures that the sun rarely reaches them, the gullies often retaining snow well into the spring. From the left when viewed from below the principal fissures are South East Gully, Central Gully and Cust's Gully (see below). To the west of the cliffs a ridge descends more gradually in the general direction of Sty Head. This is known as The Band, and it too sports a harsh gash across its features. On the western side of The Band is the deep ravine of Skew Gill, a tributary of Wasdale-bound Lingmell Beck. At the base of The Band the ridge continues as the complex top of Seathwaite Fell, replete with numerous tarns. The largest is Sprinkling Tarn with its beautifully indented shoreline providing perfect foreground for views of the cliff.

Sty Head is one of the focal points of the District for walkers. The name strictly applies to the col between Great End and Great Gable at a height of 1,560 ft (480 m), but is now more generally given to the path which crosses it. This connects two of the most popular starting points for walks in the high fells, Wasdale Head and Seathwaite. Sty Head is also a walker's crossroads with other paths leading direct up Great Gable and following the outflow of Sprinkling Tarn up to Esk Hause.

Westward from the summit Great End makes a rocky descent toward the arms of Lingmell Beck. This flank is crossed by the Corridor Route, the popular path to Scafell Pike from Sty Head. Above the path are the subsidiary top of Round How (a Nuttall) and the tiny, beautifully clear tarn of Lambfoot Dub.

The southward ridge to the Scafells crosses a shallow saddle and then climbs over Ill Crag and Broad Crag, a well-blazoned path leading across the stony terrain to the summit of Scafell Pike. To the east of the first depression is Calf Cove, its easy slopes leading down to Esk Hause.

The summit has two cairns of very similar height, that to the north-west being nearer to the cliff edge and having the better view. Northwards along Borrowdale the vista is unsurpassed, but the whole panorama is excellent. The heads of the gullies can also be approached for startling views down the face.

== Geology ==
The summit is formed by the laminated volcaniclastic claystone and siltstone of the Esk Pike Formation overlying the dacitic welded lapilli tuff of the Lincomb Tarns Formation. The latter is revealed in the great north front.

== Ascents ==
Great End may be ascended from Sty Head Tarn via The Band (not to be confused with the more famous Band on Bowfell), from Wasdale Head along Lingmell Gill and Spouthead Gill, from Borrowdale via Grains Gill, from Great Langdale via Rossett Gill and Esk Hause, or from Eskdale. As an intermediate objective Great End may easily be climbed from the main path between Esk Hause and Scafell Pike, requiring only a detour of some 400 m (1,300 ft).

== Cust's Gully ==
Cust's Gully at the western end of Great End's cliffs is named after 19th-century pioneer climber and sketcher Arthur Cust, a classical scholar from Yorkshire also known for his watercolour sketches of the Matterhorn and Mont Blanc. Cust's Gully is a Grade 1 rock climb, but a difficult obstacle for walkers ascending from Sprinkling Tarn. Cust's first winter ascent of the gully was recorded in 1880, although he is thought to have ascended it earlier.
