= Subularia monticola =

Scientific classification
- Kingdom: Plantae
- Clade: Tracheophytes
- Clade: Angiosperms
- Clade: Eudicots
- Clade: Rosids
- Order: Brassicales
- Family: Brassicaceae
- Genus: Subularia
- Species: S. monticola

Binomial name
- Subularia monticola A.Braun ex Schweinf.
- Range of Subularia monticola

Species of plant in the cabbage family

Subularia monticola is one of the water loving, annuals of the genus Subularia in the family Brassicaceae. It lives in the cool, moist high elevations of Ethiopia, Kenya, Tanzania, Uganda and Zaire.

== Description ==
Subularia monticola forms cushions or mats in moist areas in upland rainforests and moorland, such as the edges of ponds and bogs, or muddy footpaths, though it may grow underwater in some cases. It can form mats in permanently wet areas. It is a short-lived plant that lacks leaves in its early development, instead having just a stem and taproot. It grows to 5 to 16 centimeters (2.0 to 6.3 inches). It produces tiny white flowers.

== Distribution ==
Subularia monticola is an African high-altitude plant, growing at altitudes of around 2,750 to 4,750 meters (9,020 to 15,580 ft) above sea-level. Some examples will serve to demonstrate the range of environments in which it thrives:

On Mount Kilimanjaro, which is mostly arid, Subularia monticola grows in oases made by rain or melted snow collecting in depressions, where it forms continuous carpets of vegetation alongside Eriocaulon volkensii, Cyperaceae and Bulliarda elatinoides. On Mount Kenya, cracks formed by daily freezing and thawing of ice provide a refuge for Subularia monticola seedlings. It also forms short, dense mats on the occasionally flooded mudflats around Lake Kimilili, a lake 4,150 meters (13,620 ft) above sea-level on the Kenya–Uganda border.
