= Sty Head =

Coordinates: 54.47492°N 3.19747°W

Styhead Pass & Tarn from the Stretcher box

Sty Head is a mountain pass in the English Lake District, in the county of Cumbria. It is at an altitude of 1,600 feet (488 m) and there is a small tarn (Styhead Tarn) near its summit. The pass is at the head of Wasdale, which contains the lake Wastwater and it passes between the mountains of Great Gable and Scafell Pike (the latter is England's highest mountain).

The path from Wasdale was an old packhorse trail. At the highest point is the confluence of paths from Wasdale, Eskdale, Borrowdale and Great Langdale.

Sty Head also forms an important navigational and safety point between Great Gable and Scafell Pike, with the placement of the Mountain rescue stretcher box at the head of the tarn.

It is said this area is haunted by a ghoulish apparition without a visible head. Many local people have reported sightings of a strange man walking down the road with a bag moving "as if it contained cats". Although this local legend has many credible reports, various investigators have come to no conclusion or proof when tracing the real cause of this apparition.

== See also ==
- List of hill passes of the Lake District
