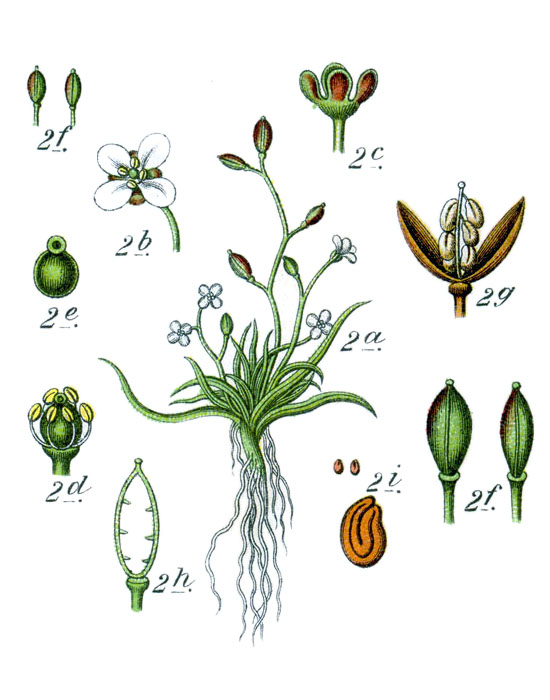
- Illustration of Subularia aquatica

Scientific classification
- Kingdom: Plantae
- Clade: Tracheophytes
- Clade: Angiosperms
- Clade: Eudicots
- Clade: Rosids
- Order: Brassicales
- Family: Brassicaceae
- Genus: Subularia; L. (1753)

Type species
- Subularia aquatica L.

Species
- Subularia aquatica L.; Subularia monticola A.Braun ex Schweinf.

= Subularia =

Genus of herbs

Subularia is a genus of plants in the family Brassicaceae. Subularia species are annual herbs that grow in moist or even flooded soils. There are only two species of the genus: Subularia aquatica, which is widespread in North America and Europe; and Subularia monticola, from Africa mountains. Awlwort is a common name for plants in this genus.

== Description ==
Stems and leaves
Hairless, with fleshy leaves all growing from the base of the stem, arranged in little roselike clusters. Individual leaves are fleshy, very narrow and with an evenly continuous edge.
Flowers
Few flowered in elongated clusters of flowers along the main stem in which the flowers at the base open first. Sepals ascending to erect, white petals, spatulate to oblong, not clearly clawed and sometimes lacking.
Fruits
Narrow elongated seed capsule which is peculiar to the family Brassicaceae.
