= Broad Crag =

Mountain in the English Lake District, Cumbria, England

- Location within the Lake District

Highest point
- Elevation: 934 m (3,064 ft)
- Prominence: 58 m (190 ft)
- Parent peak: Ill Crag
- Listing: Hewitt, Nuttall
- Coordinates: 54°27′25″N 3°12′28″W

Geography
- Location: Lake District, England
- OS grid: NY218075
- Topo map: OS Landrangers 89, 90

Broad Crag is a fell in the English Lake District. It is the fifth-highest peak in England at a height of 3,064 feet (934 metres). The mountain was gifted to the National Trust in 1923 by the Fell and Rock Climbing Club.

The peak forms part of the Scafell chain, and lies about 440 yards (400 metres) northeast of Scafell Pike. Ill Crag lies south-east, with Great End at the end of the chain about 1 mile (1.5 kilometres) to the north.

Broad Crag may be climbed en route to Scafell Pike, via a path from Esk Hause or from the route from Crinkle Crags and Bowfell.
