= Mickledore =

Ridge in Cumbria, England

Coordinates: 54°27′05″N 3°13′11″W

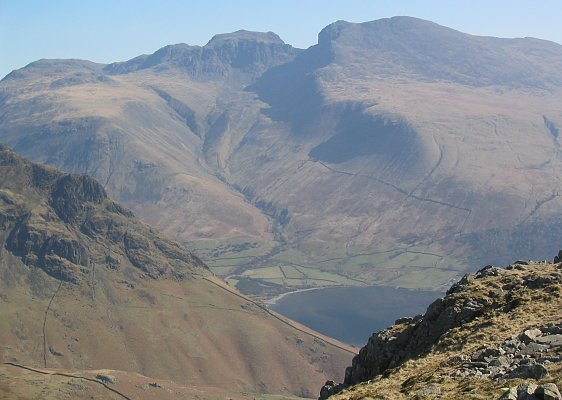
Looking east from Middle Fell across Wastwater. Mickledore is the distinctive notch in the skyline between Scafell Pike (left) and Scafell (right).

Mickledore is a narrow ridge at an elevation of 840 metres (2,760 ft), connecting the mountains of Scafell and Scafell Pike in the English Lake District. It is also a pass between the valleys of Wasdale and Eskdale. The name means great door or pass.

The ridge is easily reached and traversed from Scafell Pike to the north, or from the valleys to the east and west. However, access to the summit of Scafell is barred by the rockface of Broad Stand, which looks much easier to climb than it is.

== Broad Stand ==
Broad Stand is a steep buttress wall requiring sequential bouldering moves, which have been described as anything from scrambling to rock climbing. It is described as 'extremely dangerous' by Wasdale Mountain Rescue Team, and the climb is "Difficult" in the British grading system. In descent, the cliff is even more dangerous.

The poet Samuel Taylor Coleridge probably made a descent of Broad Stand on 5 August 1802; he wrote:

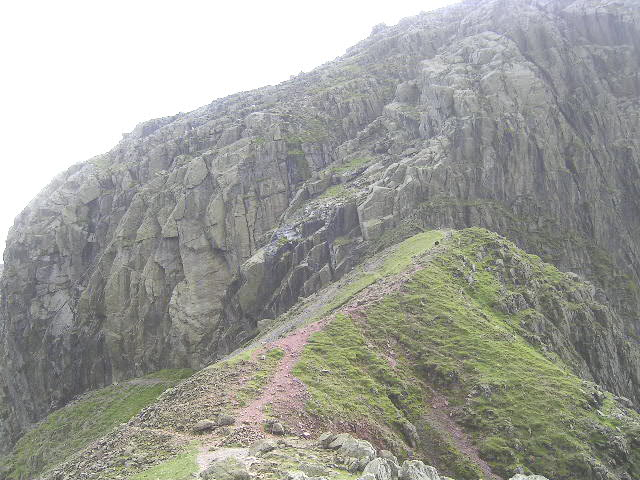
Looking south from Mickledore towards Broad Stand

..."I began to suspect that I ought not to go on, but then unfortunately tho' I could with ease drop down a smooth Rock 7 feet (2.1 m) high, I could not climb it, so go on I must and on I went. The next 3 drops were not half a Foot, at least not a foot more than my own height, but every Drop increased the Palsy of my Limbs—I shook all over, Heaven knows without the least influence of Fear, and now I had only two more to drop down, to return was impossible—but of these two the first was tremendous, it was twice my own height, and the Ledge at the bottom was so exceedingly narrow, that if I dropt down upon it I must of necessity have fallen backwards and of course killed myself. My Limbs were all in a tremble—I lay upon my Back to rest myself, and was beginning according to my Custom to laugh at myself for a Madman, when the sight of the Crags above me on each side, and the impetuous Clouds just over them, posting so luridly and so rapidly northward, overawed me. I lay in a state of almost prophetic Trance and Delight—and blessed God aloud, for the powers of Reason and the Will, which remaining no Danger can overpower us!

The historian and outdoor enthusiast W. G. Collingwood wrote in his classic guide book The Lake Counties:

..."Indeed, it stands up with pinnacles and buttresses so high, and flanking precipice's so deep, and even in places overhanging, that here, if anywhere in these mountains, one can get the impression of size and awesomeness ... Right in front of Mickledore ridge the blocky volcanic-ash formation cleaves into a set of gigantic steps, as it were tilted from behind, so that the top of each step slopes outwards, and what should be vertical overhangs (Note: See Scafell Pike > Etymology > ..."to jut out”...) ... That is the Broad Stand...

== Route to Scafell ==
The walker seeking a safe route between England's highest mountains must go via Foxes Tarn, which involves a descent to 680 metres (2,230 ft) or so below the height of the ridge. The more challenging routes of Lord's Rake, and the West Wall Traverse, offer alternative ways to reach Scafell.

=== Route to Scafell via Foxes Tarn ===
From the Mickledore ridge it is necessary to descend on the south side to pick up the path to Foxes Tarn. Older OS maps show the path junction near the confluence of two streams at about 680 m, however later maps show the path junction lower down at about 650 m. It is possible that the old path has been replaced with a newer one.

Name	Height	Descent	Ascent	OS Grid	Notes
Scafell Pike	978m	0	0	NY 215 072	Highest peak in England
Mickledore col	840m	138m	0	NY 209 069	
Path junction	650m	190m	0	NY 212 065	The path to Foxes Tarn
Foxes Tarn	820m	0	170m	NY 209 064	
Scafell	964m	0	144m	NY 207 065	Second highest peak in England
		328m	314m		Height difference 14m

== History ==
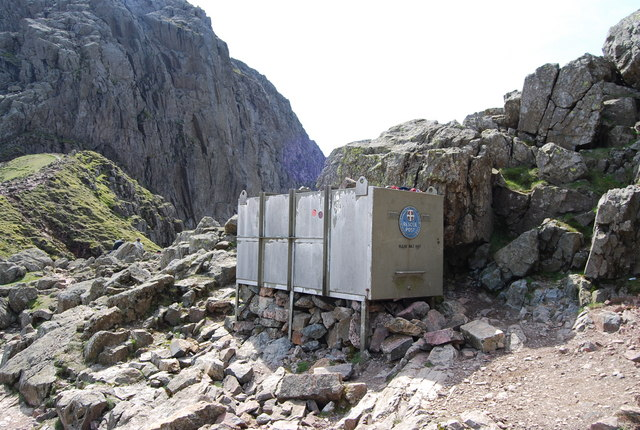
Mountain rescue post, Mickledore

The Mickledore mountain rescue stretcher box was airlifted to the site by the Royal Air Force Mountain Rescue Service in 1974. (Note: News article posted August 2015..."The Mickledore box was airlifted to the site by the crew of an RAF helicopter..." See comment by John Nowell dated 12 December 2022..."I was the pilot of that RAF Puma helicopter long ago in 1974...)

== See also ==
- List of hill passes of the Lake District
