= Jonathan Otley =

British watchmaker and geologist (1766-1856)

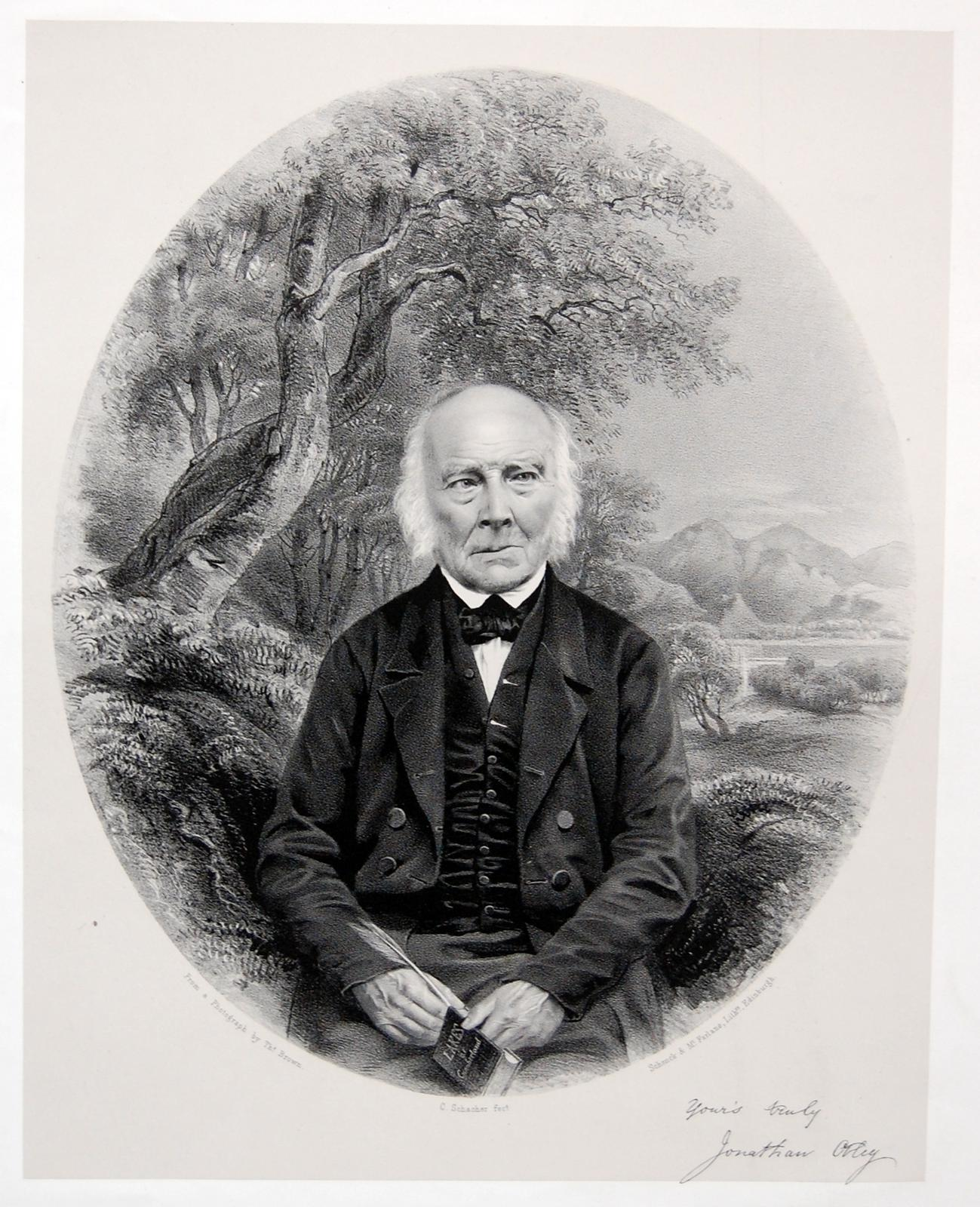
- Jonathan Otley c. 1850
- Born: 19 January 1766; Nook House near Loughrigg Tarn, Cumbria, England
- Died: 7 December 1856 (aged 90); Keswick, Cumbria
- Occupations: Watchmaker and instrument repairer, geologist and tour guide
- Known for: The Father of Lakeland Geology

Jonathan Otley (19 January 1766 — 7 December 1856) was a self-taught English geologist whose detailed observations in the English Lake District set the foundations for the study of that area's geology.

== Early life ==
Otley was born on 19 January 1766 at Nook House (also known as The Scroggs) close to Loughrigg Tarn, Cumbria. He came from a working family earning his living making wooden sieves and baskets with his father, over time he learnt how to clean clocks and watches.

He moved from Nook House to Keswick in 1791 and set up in business as a watchmaker, instrument repairer and engraver. He was also a surveyor/map-maker who carried out topographic surveys and the knowledge gained from exploring and observing the Lakeland countryside enabled him to supplement his income by working as a guide. Otley was interested in meteorology and natural history, particularly geology and botany, and one of his "hobbies was planting flowers and ferns beside the mountain springs".

In 1797 Otley moved into a cottage near the centre of Keswick, in King's Head Court, where he spent the rest of his life. The cottage, which still exists, was up a flight of steps and became known as "Jonathan's Up the Steps". Being clever with his hands he soon earned himself the reputation as a chap who could “fettle up maist anything”.

== Collaborations with established scientists ==
Otley corresponded with several eminent scientists of his day and was visited by many of them, these included William Pearson (who less than 10 years later was instrumental in founding the Astronomical Society of London, now known as the Royal Astronomical Society), in 1809 Otley accompanied Pearson on an excursion up Skiddaw and afterwards Otley was entrusted with the barometer that Pearson had taken with them.

By chance he met John Dalton (who developed the chemical atomic theory) on 6 July 1812 whilst ascending Skiddaw to make meteorological observations. Dalton had been undertaking regular excursions in the Lake District hills for over 15 years and, after a discussion about the barometer he was carrying, Dalton invited Otley to join him the following day on an excursion to make observations on Scafell.

Over the following 25 years Dalton visited the Lake District nearly every summer. He met Otley on at least 19 of those visits and Otley would generally accompany him on his excursions. They investigated Derwent Water's "Floating Island" together and when Dalton was taking barometric readings in the lakeland hills, Otley would check his own altitude measurements against Dalton's barometric measurements. Otley became both an assistant and a friend to Dalton, acting in the capacity of both a colleague and a paid guide.

Otley had been preparing a topographic map of the Lake District which was published in 1818. The map was also engraved by him and an updated copy was included in the guide to the lakes that he first published in 1823. The 1823 guide included his geological insights, Sedgwick described it as "the best guide to the Lakes that ever was written". Later editions, which included material relating to the Yorkshire Dales, provided the first published descriptions of a number of the caves in the Three Counties System of northern England. The guide was widely read by travellers and naturalists of the time, overall eight editions were published between 1823-1849 and a total of over 8000 copies were sold.

Otley also corresponded with George Airy, whilst he was the Astronomer Royal, and John Phillips, the keeper of the Yorkshire Museum.

== Otley the geologist ==
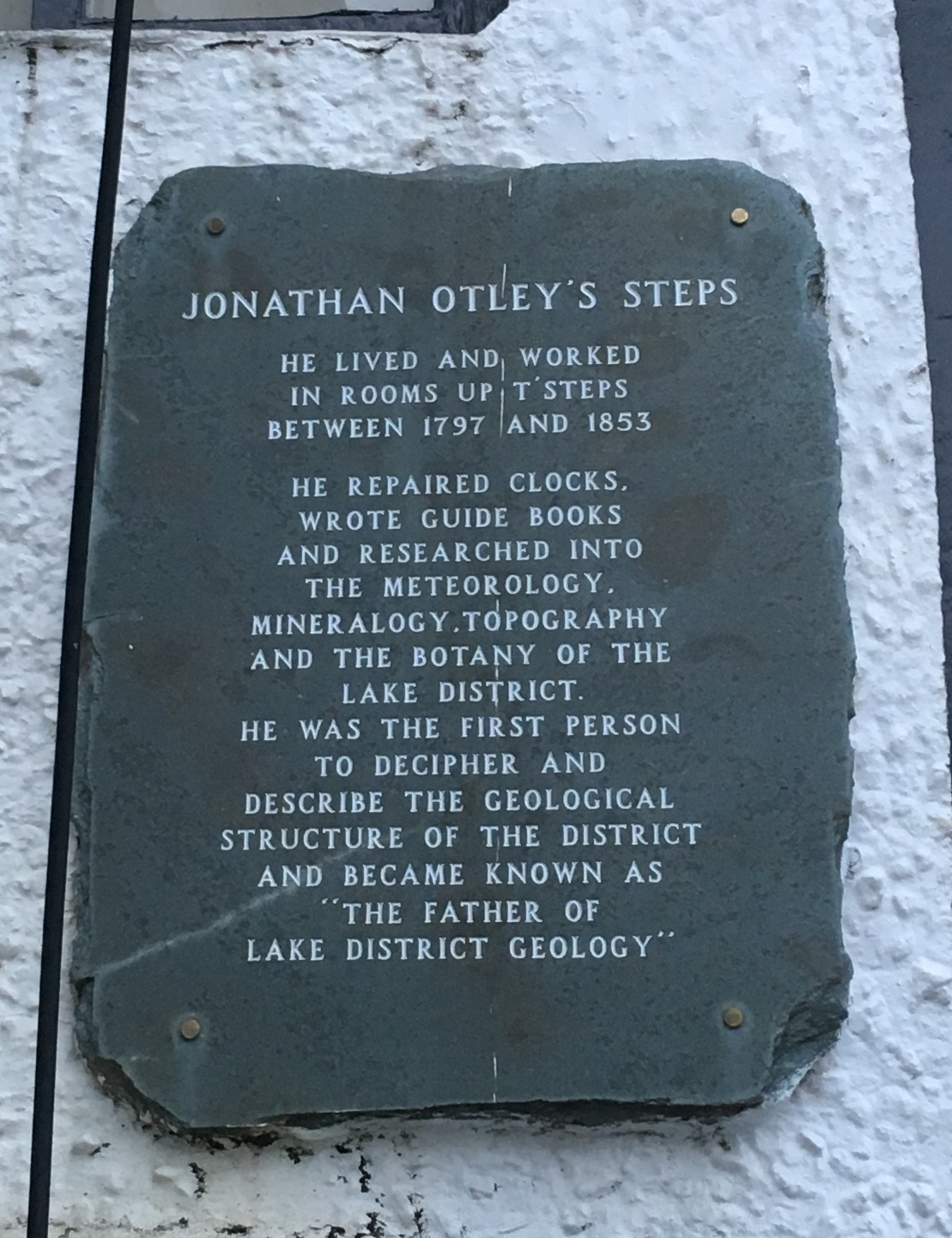
Plaque in Kings Head Court

Otley "brought a new type of observation to the dales - minute, exact and detached" and in 1820 he published the first scientific account of the geology of the Lake District. He grouped the strata of the Lake District into three principal units which are now know to be of Lower Palaeozoic age. Those three broad divisions are still in use in the 21st century (although the names of the units have been changed and sub-units have been established). He named the three divisions as "clay-slates", "green slates and porphyries" and "greywacke", those correspond with what is now known as the Skiddaw Group, the Eycott and Borrowdale volcanic groups, and the Windermere Supergroup.

The following year, when William Smith (who made the first geological map of Britain) was carrying out a traverse of the Lake District, he and Otley met and compared notes on the region's geology. A couple of years later, in 1823, Otley first met Adam Sedgwick, (the Woodwardian Professor of Geology at the University of Cambridge from 1818-1873), and during the summers of 1823 and 1824 he guided him round the district. That was the beginning of a 30-year long close professional relationship between the two men during which Sedgwick's work first "built on the foundations of geological knowledge laid by Otley", and later "massively extending" Otley's contribution. Sedgwick described Otley to Peter Bellinger Brodie as "the teacher on all we know of the country" and J.E. Marr (who was the Woodwardian Professor from 1917-1930), wrote that Otley "must undoubtedly be regarded as the Father of Lakeland Geology".

In 1827 Otley produced one of the first geological maps of the Lake District.

== Later life and legacy ==
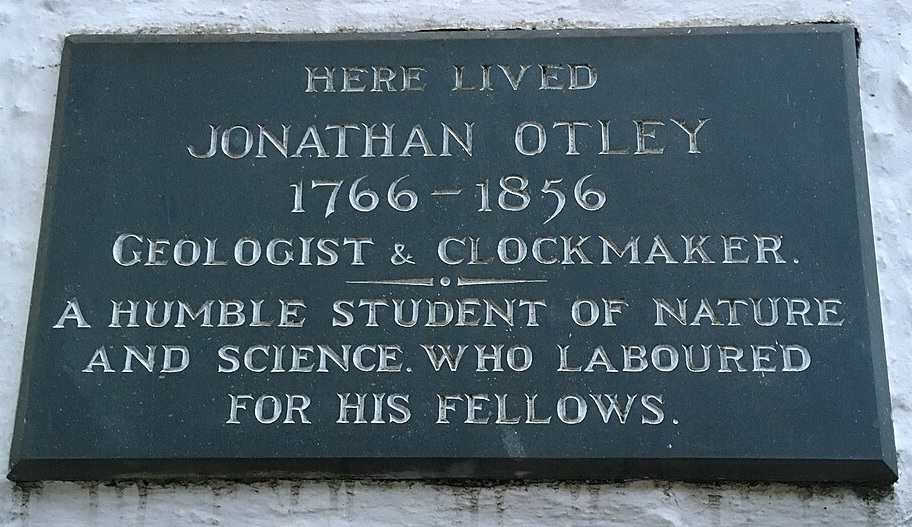

Otley died in Keswick on 7 December 1856 and was buried in Crosthwaite Churchyard. A simple slate plaque acts as a memorial on the flight of stone steps, Jonathan's Steps, in King’s Head Court, close by Keswick's Moot Hall.

He recorded the summer level of Derwent Water during particularly dry years by cutting a notch-mark in the rocks below Friars’ Crag, the marks record the lake's level in 1824, 1826, 1844 and 1852 and they can still be seen in dry seasons. Otley presented a series of geological specimens to Keswick Museum which also houses some of his scientific equipment and displays in that museum continue to feature aspects of his work.
