= Foxes Tarn =

Mountain lake in Cumbria, England

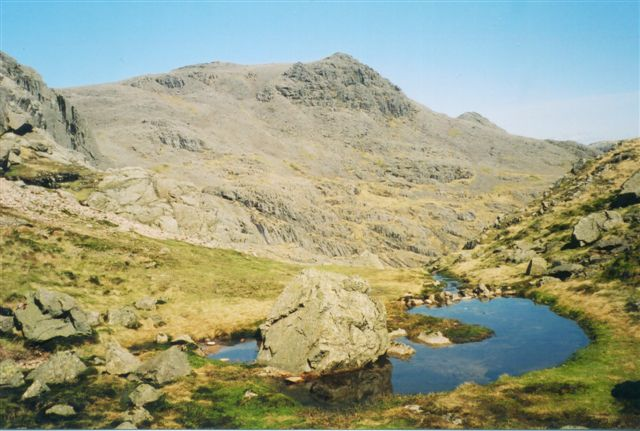
- Foxes Tarn in 2006 looking towards Scafell Pike

- Location in the Lake District Location in Copeland Borough
- Location: Sca Fell, Cumbria
- Coordinates: 54°26′49.55″N 3°13′16.34″W
- Max. depth: 0.5 metres (1.6 ft) to 3 feet (0.91 m)
- Surface elevation: approx 820–830 m (2,690–2,720 ft)

Foxes Tarn is one of the smallest named tarns in the Lake District of England, situated slightly to the east of the summit of Sca Fell.

Foxes Tarn is also one of the highest named tarns in the Lake District, with either it or the nearby Broadcrag Tarn being the higher. Harry Griffin writing in The Guardian gives the height of Broadcrag Tarn as 2,746 feet (837 m) (N.B. this does not agree well with the latest OS maps). The Nuttall's guide puts Broadcrag Tarn as slightly higher, based on looking at large-scale maps. A higher unnamed tarn on Long Top, the highest of the Crinkle Crags, has an altitude of 2,786 feet (849 m).

The tarn varies in size and has very little outflow, but what little there is descends to How Beck and the River Esk.

Foxes Tarn is well known to fell-walkers due to its location on one of the standard routes between Scafell Pike and Scafell, the two highest mountains in England. The direct ridge route crosses Broad Stand, which can only be negotiated safely by rock-climbers. Two main alternatives exist for walkers, one being via Lord's Rake, and the other involving a descent to Foxes Tarn before a re-ascent. The tarn is at a significantly lower elevation than Mickledore, the col between the mountains, so while the Foxes Tarn route is easier, it also requires more re-ascent.
