= Scafell =

Mountain in the English Lake District, Cumbria, England

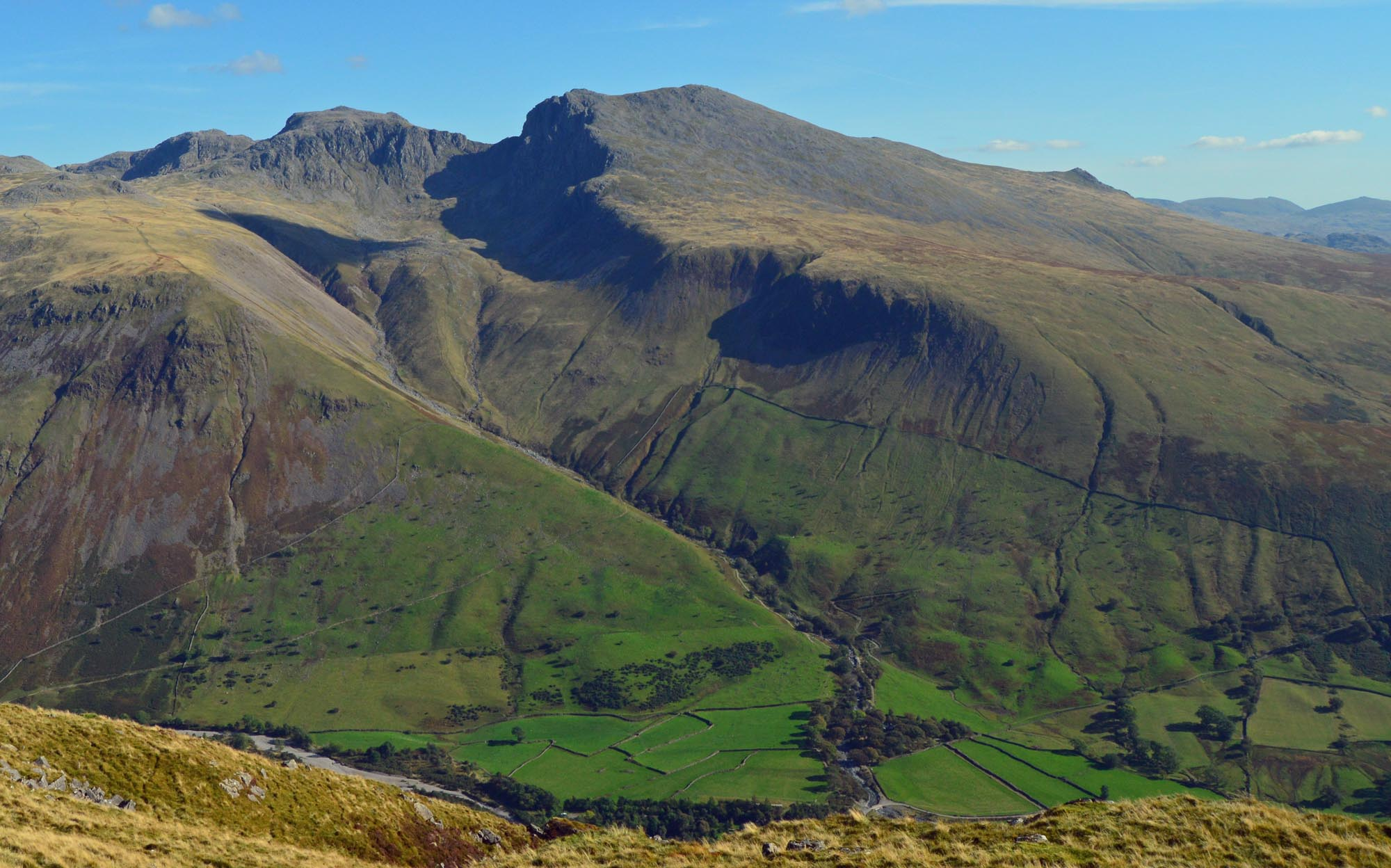
- The Scafell massif from Middle Fell. Scafell is on the right. From this angle Scafell appears higher than Scafell Pike.

Highest point
- Elevation: 964 m (3,163 ft)
- Prominence: 133 m (436 ft)
- Parent peak: Scafell Pike
- Listing: Hewitt, Wainwright, Nuttall
- Coordinates: 54°26′53″N 3°13′30″W

Geography
- Location within the Lake District Location within the former Borough of Copeland
- Location: Cumbria, England
- Parent range: Lake District, Southern Fells
- OS grid: NY206064
- Topo map: OS Landrangers 89, 90, Explorer OL6

Listed summits of Scafell
Name	Grid ref	Height	Status
Symond's Knott	NY207067	959 m (3,146 ft)	Nuttall

Scafell (/ˈskɔːfəl/ or /skɑːˈfɛl/; also spelled Sca Fell, previously Scawfell) is a mountain in the Lake District region of Cumbria, England. It has a height of 964 metres (3,163 feet), making it the second-highest mountain in England after its neighbour, Scafell Pike, from which it is separated by Mickledore col.

== Topography ==
Scafell stands between Wasdale in the west and upper Eskdale to the east. The highest part of the fell is a ridge running south from Mickledore as far as Slight Side, which is counted as a separate fell by most guidebooks. Despite regarding Slight Side as a separate entity, Wainwright included the wide upland area beyond it to the south west as a part of Scafell. More modern guides have partitioned the plateau off as a further independent top, Great How.

The opposing flanks of Scafell are different in character. To the south, smooth slopes, stony and lacking vegetation at higher levels, run down toward Burnmoor and the head of Wastwater. On the east side several large crags loom over upper Eskdale. The north side contains the sheer faces of Scafell Crag.

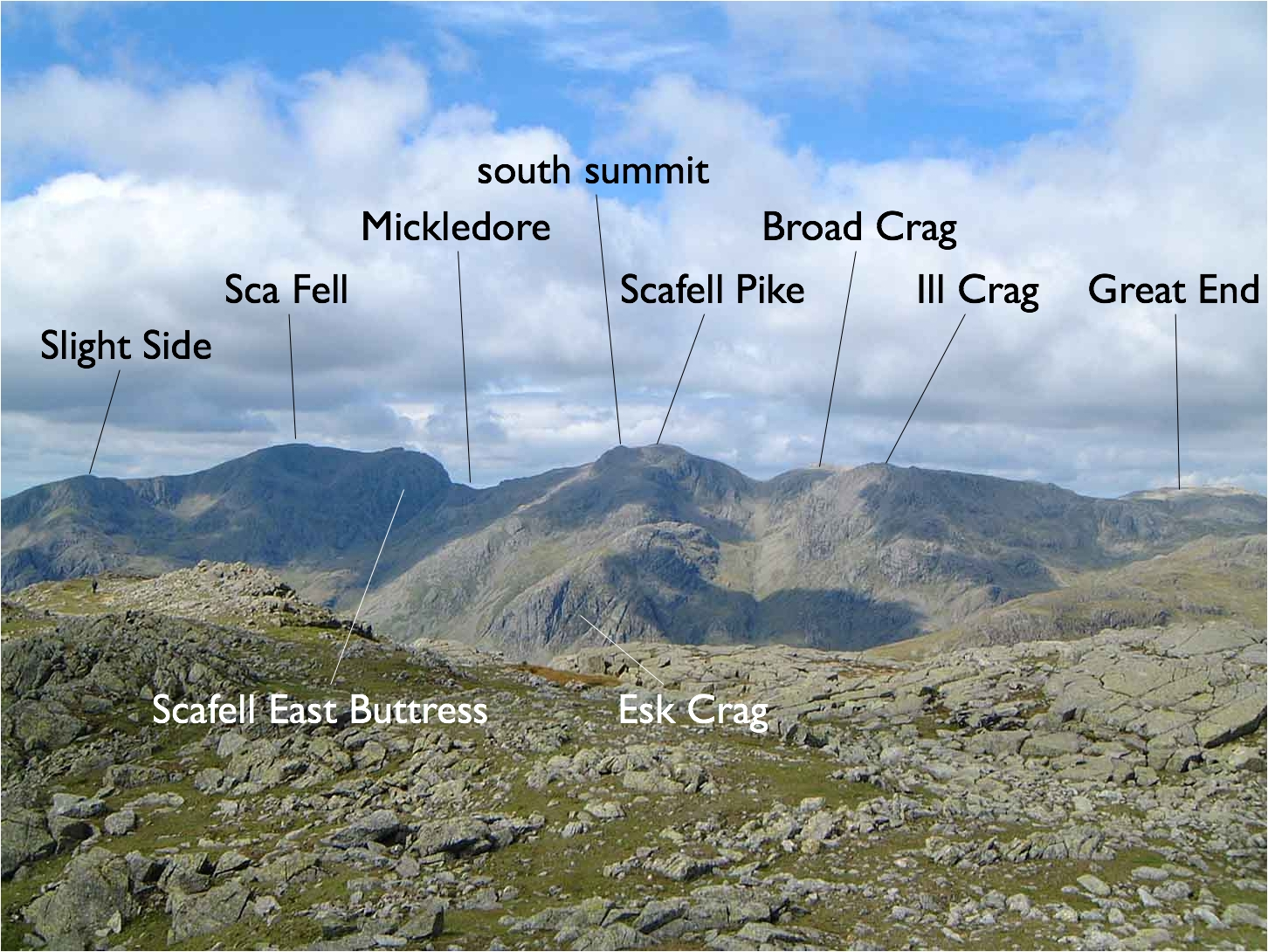
The Scafell range as seen looking west from Crinkle Crags. (Interactive labels.)

From the narrow ridge of Mickledore the northern face of Scafell rises precipitously, an unusually complete barrier to progress along a Lakeland ridge, which frustrates many ridge walkers who find that this is a cliff for rock climbers only. At the top of the rise from Mickledore is Symonds Knott (959 m or 3,146 ft), the northern top. The wall of crags – Scafell Crag to the west and the East Buttress above the Eskdale side of Mickledore – has two main weaknesses. Running laterally across Scafell Crag is Lord's Rake, a scree-filled chute with several intermediate cols. It has two upper entrances onto the saddle separating Symonds Knott from the main summit. Formerly passable as a scramble, Lord's Rake suffered from a serious rock fall in 2002 — with subsequent further falls — and recent guidebooks do not consider it a viable route, although it is gradually becoming more stable. The block that was bridged across the head of Lord's Rake collapsed into the gully in July 2016, leaving several small unstable blocks behind, which can be avoided with care. The access to West Wall Traverse is clear of debris. The second breach in the crags is Broad Stand, a series of sloping steps which drop down from Symonds Knott almost to Mickledore; however, these steepen immediately above Mickledore and cannot be negotiated safely except by rock-climbers. The main summit stands a little to the south of the saddle, all around being a sea of stones. An easy ridge then steps down southward over Long Green to Slight Side. On the east are Cam Spout Crag and the fine high waterfall after which it is named.

Beyond Slight Side is a rough upland with many craggy tops and a number of tarns, before the southward descent finally ends in Lower Eskdale. South West of Scafell, below the scarp of Great How, is Burnmoor Tarn, one of the largest in Lakeland. Around 40 ft (12 m) deep, it holds trout, perch and pike. The tarn is prevented from following what would appear the natural line of drainage into Miterdale by moraines, and empties southward, reaching the Esk at Beckfoot. Near the southern shore stands Burnmoor Lodge, once a keeper's cottage and a dwelling two miles (three kilometres) from the nearest road.

== Summit ==
The main summit bears a large cairn on a short rocky ridge. Northward is a saddle, marked by a large cross of stones and then the bouldery climb to Symonds Knott, the north top. This gives views straight down to Mickledore. Scafell gives a very different view to that from its higher neighbour with Wastwater and the coastal plain given great prominence. There is a fine vista of the Western Fells, together with Bowfell and the Coniston Fells.

== Ascents ==
=== Wasdale ===
The classic ascent via Lord's Rake path from Wastwater follows the main Scafell Pike footpath to Hollow Stones, then up to Lord's Rake. Lord's Rake may be followed in its entirety, or near the top of the first col, a diversion may be made onto the West Wall Traverse, the exit of which lies closer to the summit. However one section of Lord's Rake is now threatened by unstable rocks following a rock fall in 2001. An alternative is to ascend from the Burnmoor track via Green How, but this misses the rock scenery of Scafell Crag.

=== Eskdale ===
A longer alternative begins from Boot in Eskdale, following the River Esk upstream, and scrambling up to the summit by way of Foxes Tarn. A gentler return can be made across moorland, by way of the Burnmoor Tarn. Also starting in Eskdale, the Terrace route can be followed from Wha House, first ascending Slight Side.

=== From Scafell Pike ===
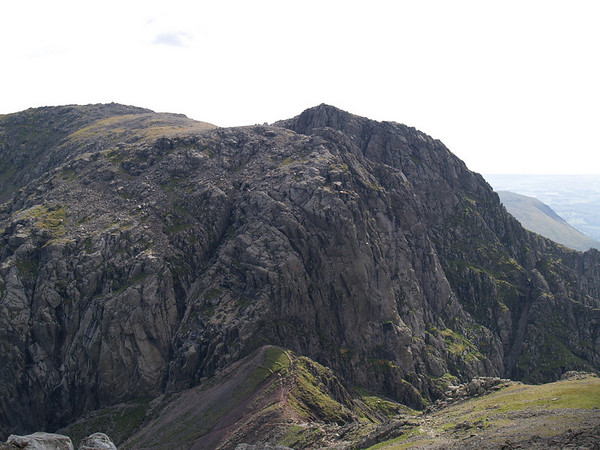
The Broad Stand route is visible directly across the connecting ridge of Mickledore

The route from Scafell Pike to Scafell (or its reverse) is one of the most frustrating in the Lake District. What seems like a direct route is in fact very hazardous as it has to negotiate Broad Stand crag, which is a dangerous and exposed scramble that has caused many accidents and injuries. It is usually treated as a rock climb, with appropriate ropes and belay protection. Wainwright warns against its dangers to walkers. Its dangers are more obvious travelling from Scafell Pike, but travelling from Scafell, the route loses a lot of height before the danger is seen. Instead there are two walking routes, but they entail some loss of altitude. The first is via Foxes Tarn to the East of Scafell summit, and the second is via Lord's Rake and the West Wall traverse. All routes go via Mickledore.

=== Rock Climbing ===
Scafell Crag, the massive north buttress of Scafell, and the overhanging East Buttress to the East of Mickledore Col, are the site of many famous historic and contemporary rock climbs. The history of climbing on these crags is documented by a book by The Fell and Rock Climbing Club called Nowt but a fleein' thing. ISBN 978-0-85028-059-3, Latitude Press.

== Name history ==
Until about 1920, the phonetic spelling "Scawfell" was the most common version. This was used by, among others William Wordsworth who, in addition to poetry, wrote a popular guide book to the Lake District, Harriet Martineau (whose work replaced Wordsworth's as the definitive guidebook), Jonathan Otley (who was one of the first to measure the height of most of the Lakeland fells), John Dalton (who also estimated the elevation of many of the fells), the surveyor of the Wasdale Head Enclosure map of 30 January 1808 and the hotel keepers and tour operators who lived or operated in the area, as typified by the many adverts in M. J. B. Baddeley's guide of 1895 (versus the guide text which was consistent with the maps therein). This split between local usage and maps printed by national publishers is further illustrated by the Wasdale Hall Estate Plan and Sales Particulars, dated 30th Sept 1920. This uses the spelling "Scawfell" throughout except in the map attached which was reproduced with permission of the Ordnance Survey. The first edition of the Rock and Fell Club Guide was titled "Climbs on the Scawfell Group". The phonetic "Scawfell" was still noticeably in use in the 1950s.

The change to the shorter spelling appears to have originated in the Donald Map of 1774, a document with a noticeable number of placename errors. This was then perpetuated by the Ordnance Survey from 1867. The Donald map is the first to name many mountains in the Lake District - earlier maps concentrated on showing passes through the mountains. Until 1867 the two spellings are roughly equally split on maps, the shorter form being more common with London publishers. General usage at the time was predominantly "Scawfell". The only notable guide book that used "Scafell" prior to 1867 is Ford. The Ordnance Survey produced detailed procedures on capturing correct placenames in 1825, largely as a result of their survey work transferring to Ireland between 1824 and 1838. However, when they restarted their work in England, given the status of Sca Fell as an essential surveying station (taking bearings of Slieve Donard and Snowdon, thereby helping to fix the relative positions of Ireland and England), the familiarity with this mountain probably meant that the "Name Book" procedures were overlooked. Hence the correct enquiries were not made and the mistake of Donald was perpetuated.

Wainwright stated that, originally, the name Scawfell/Scafell referred to the whole of the massif from Great End south to Slight Side; only more recently had the general term become applied solely to the part of the fell south of Mickledore. Wainwright's comments on this in book 4: "When men first named the mountains, the whole of the high mass south of Sty Head was known as Scaw Fell....". However, Jonathan Otley, writing in the first concise guide to the Lake District, maintained that local shepherds applied the name "Scawfell" only as far as Mickledore, with the summits beyond called simply "the Pikes". Otley also comments that the Donald map of 1774 and the Ordnance Survey were incorrect in their naming. Scafell Pike and Scafell were referred to by the Ordnance Survey in their 1811 report as "Sca-Fell Higher Top" and "Sca-Fell Lower Top". This can be confirmed from the 1811 account, a modern map and some elementary trigonometry. .

Once Scafell Pike (which has its own convoluted name history) had been identified as England's highest mountain, that fact and the greater interest in climbing and fell-walking necessitated the Scafell Range being broken down into a number of individually named elements. This process was completed before the death of Jonathan Otley in 1856, as Otley commented on this change.

It was once believed that Scafell was the highest mountain in this part of the Lake District – it is much more prominent in views from many directions than its higher neighbour – with the three apparently inferior peaks to the north (those now known as Scafell Pike, Ill Crag and Broad Crag) being known collectively as the "Pikes of Scawfell". The heights of many of the fells were first measured by John Dalton (Scafell: 990 m or 3,240 ft) as a result of his study of meteorology and Jonathan Otley, who published a height of 940 m (3,100 ft) for "Scawfell" on his map of 1818. The Ordnance Survey first gave a height of 965 m (3,166 ft), but this remained essentially unpublished until the maps of Cumberland were printed. Dorothy Wordsworth did discover shortly after her ascent of "The Pikes" (Scafell Pike) in 1818 that this peak was higher than Sca Fell - presumably from Otley's map and guide book.

== Gallery ==
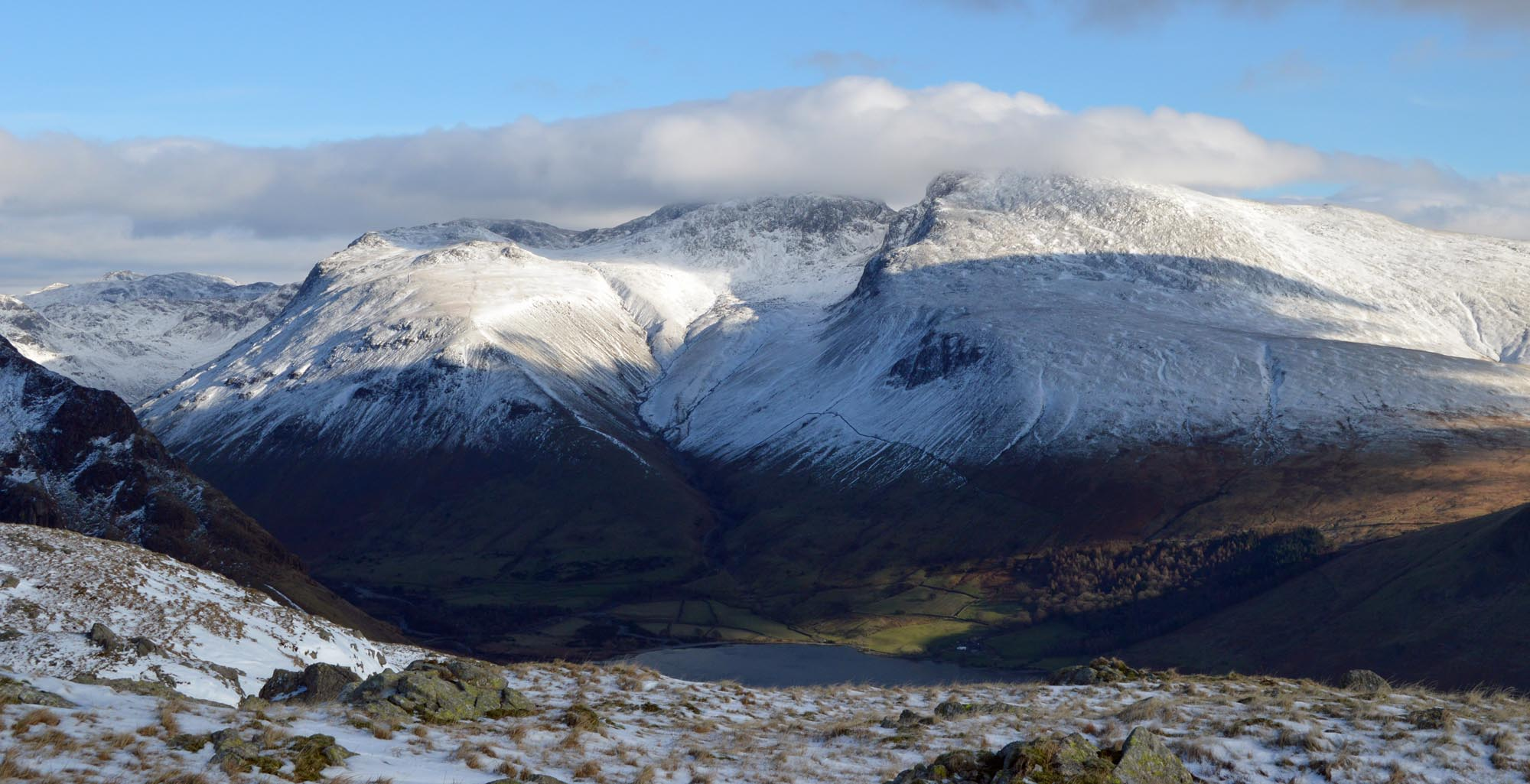
Scafell massif from Middle Fell.

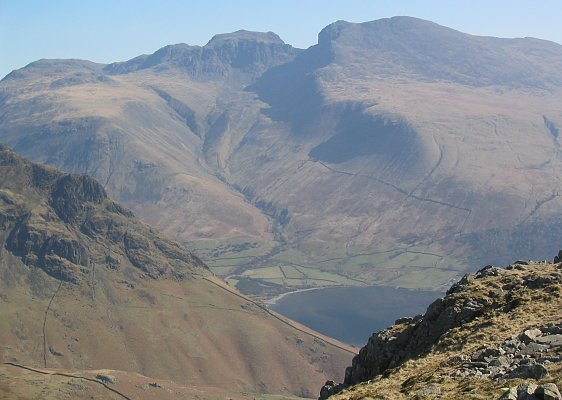
Scafell massif from Middle Fell

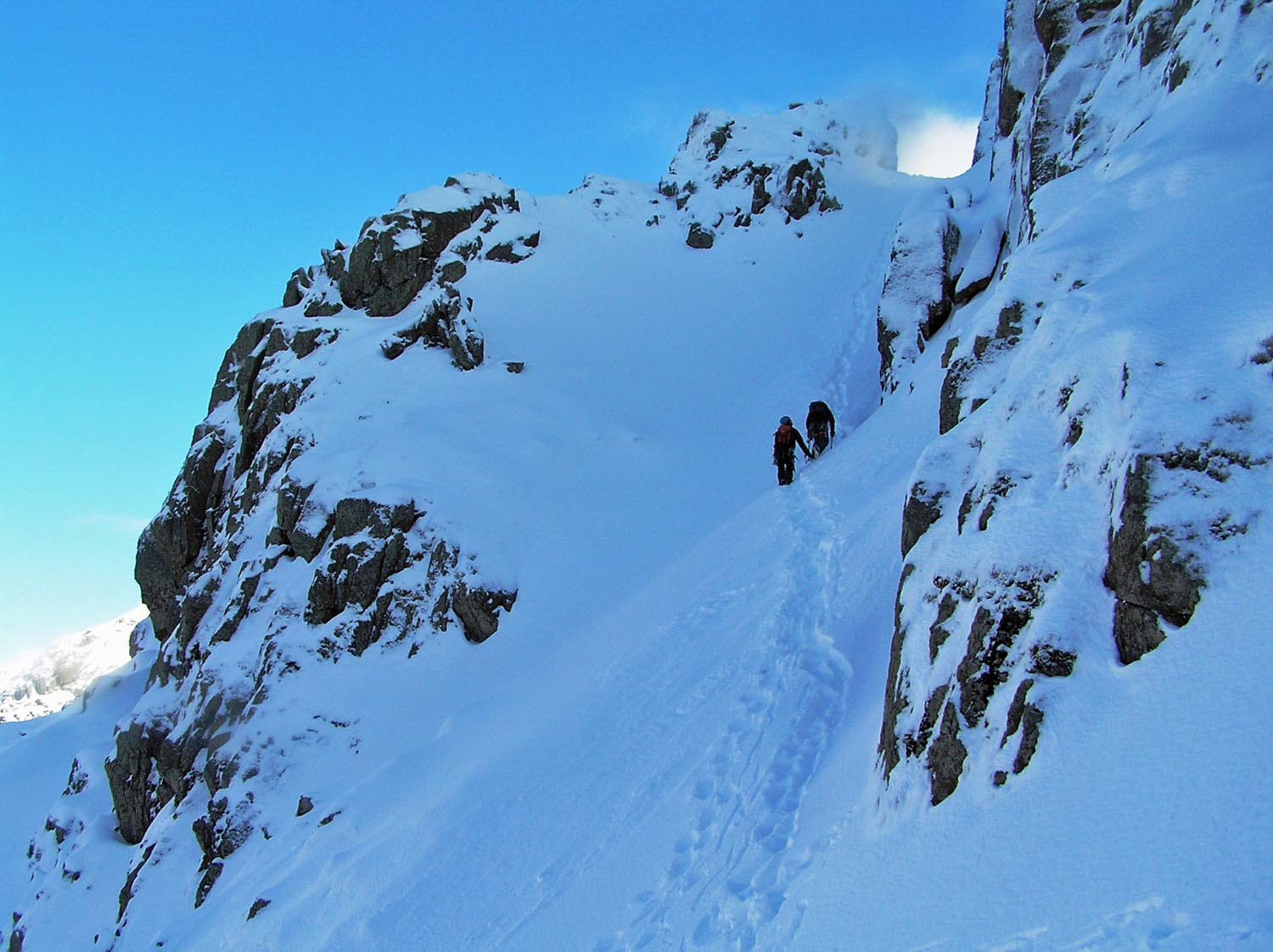
Lords Rake, Scafell, Cumbria - 2010

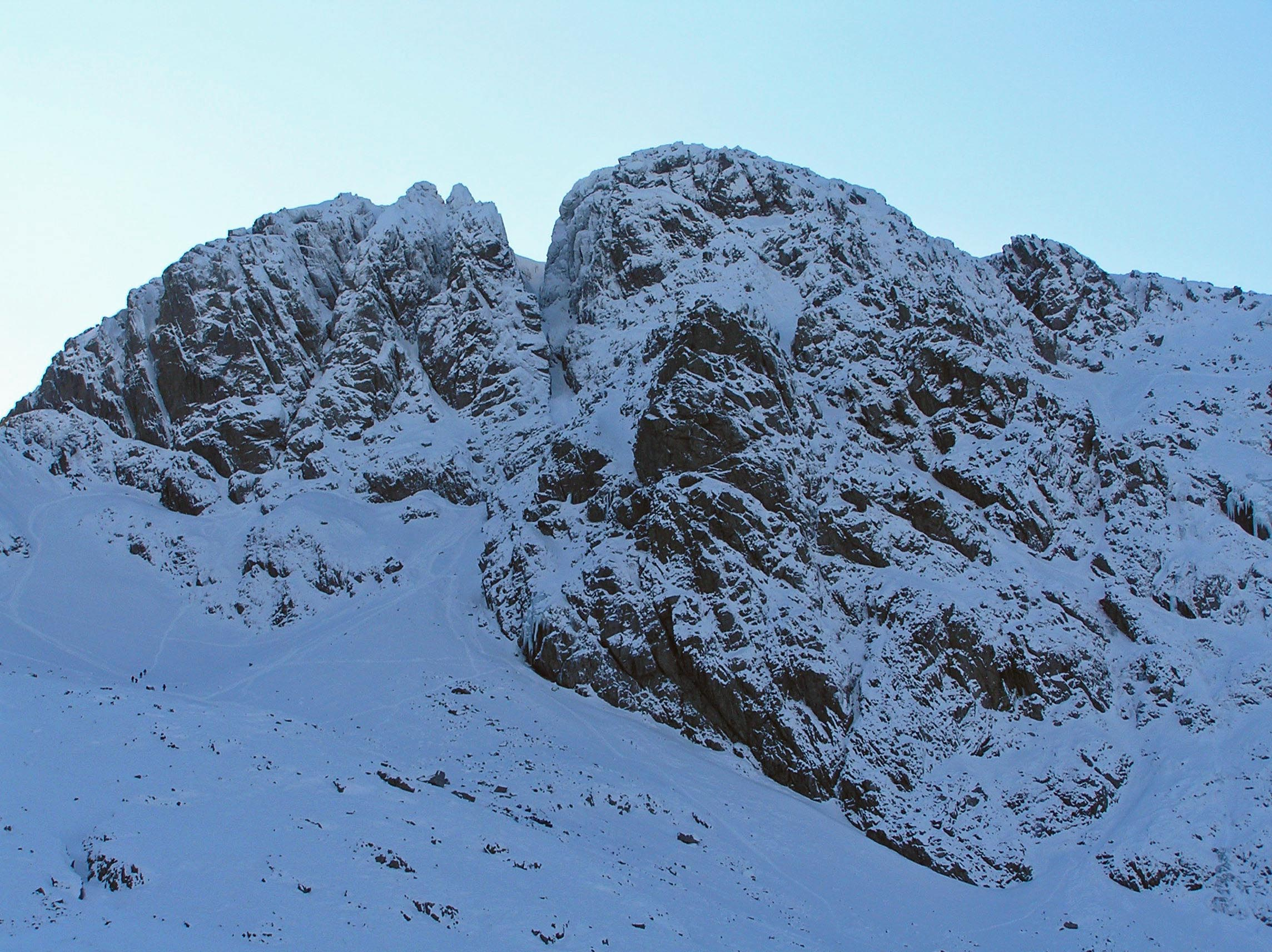
Scafell Crag, Cumbria, from the north, 2010

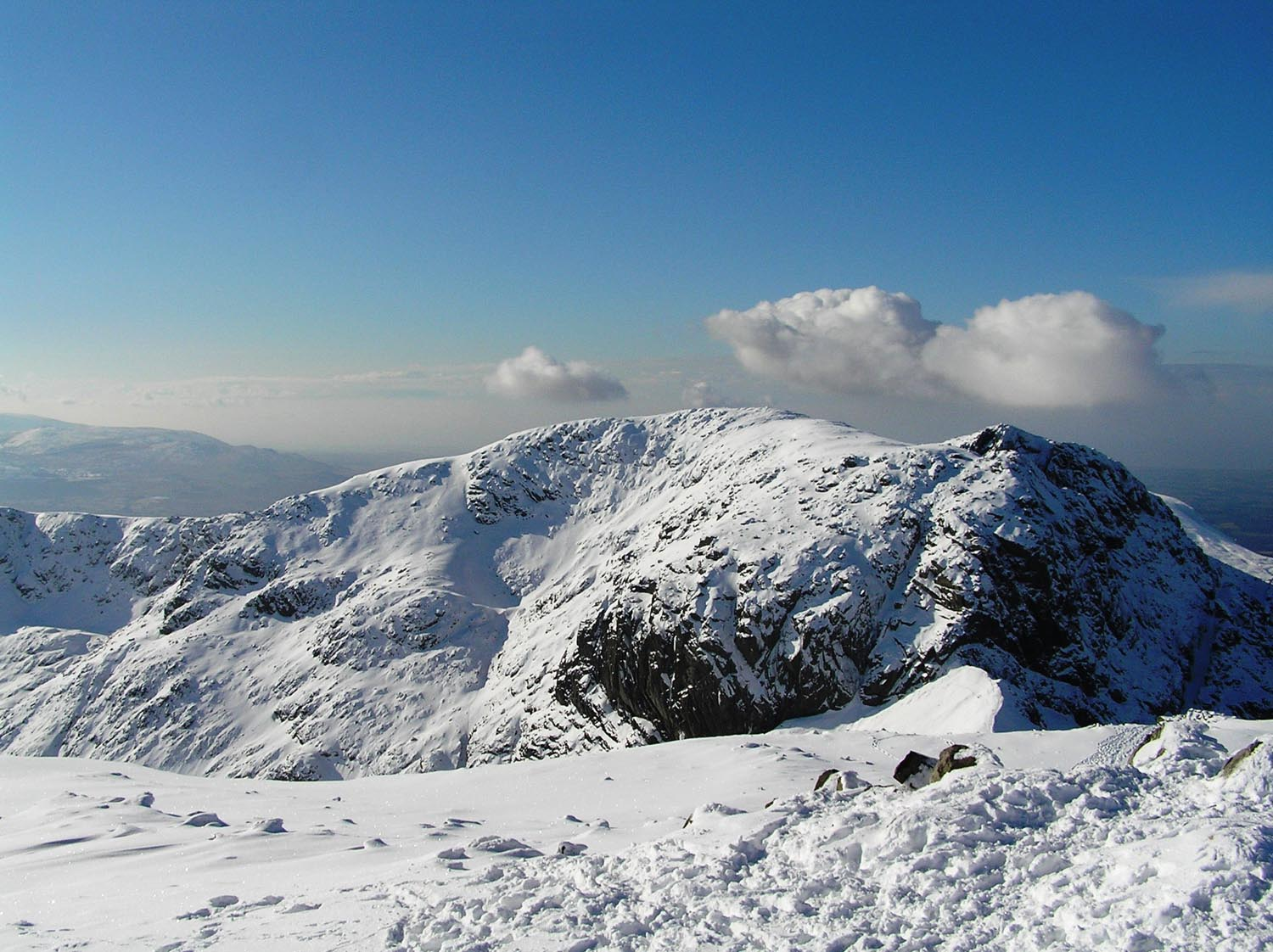
Scafell from Scafell Pike, - 2010.

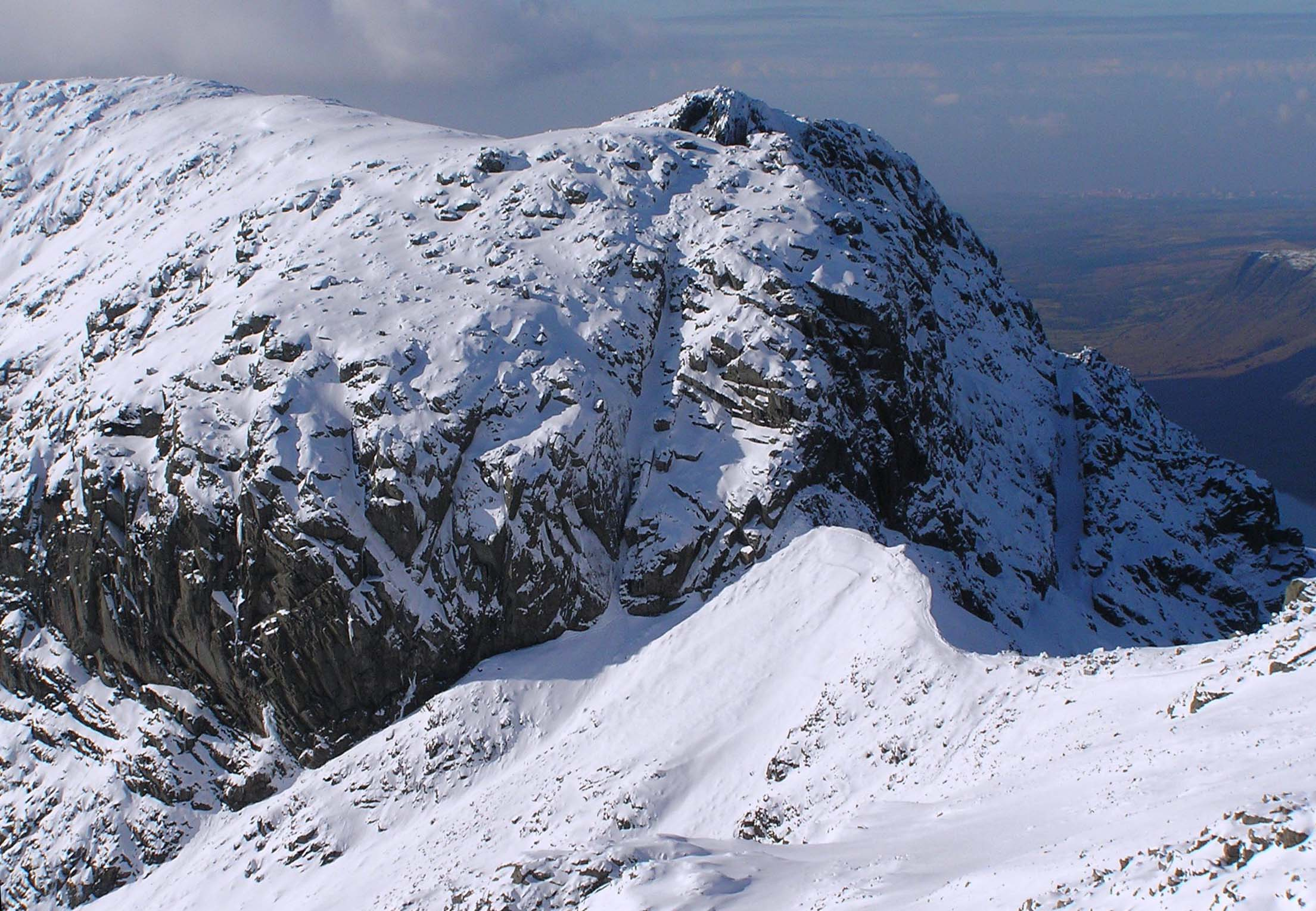
Detail in snow of Broadstand, Scafell, Cumbria - 2010

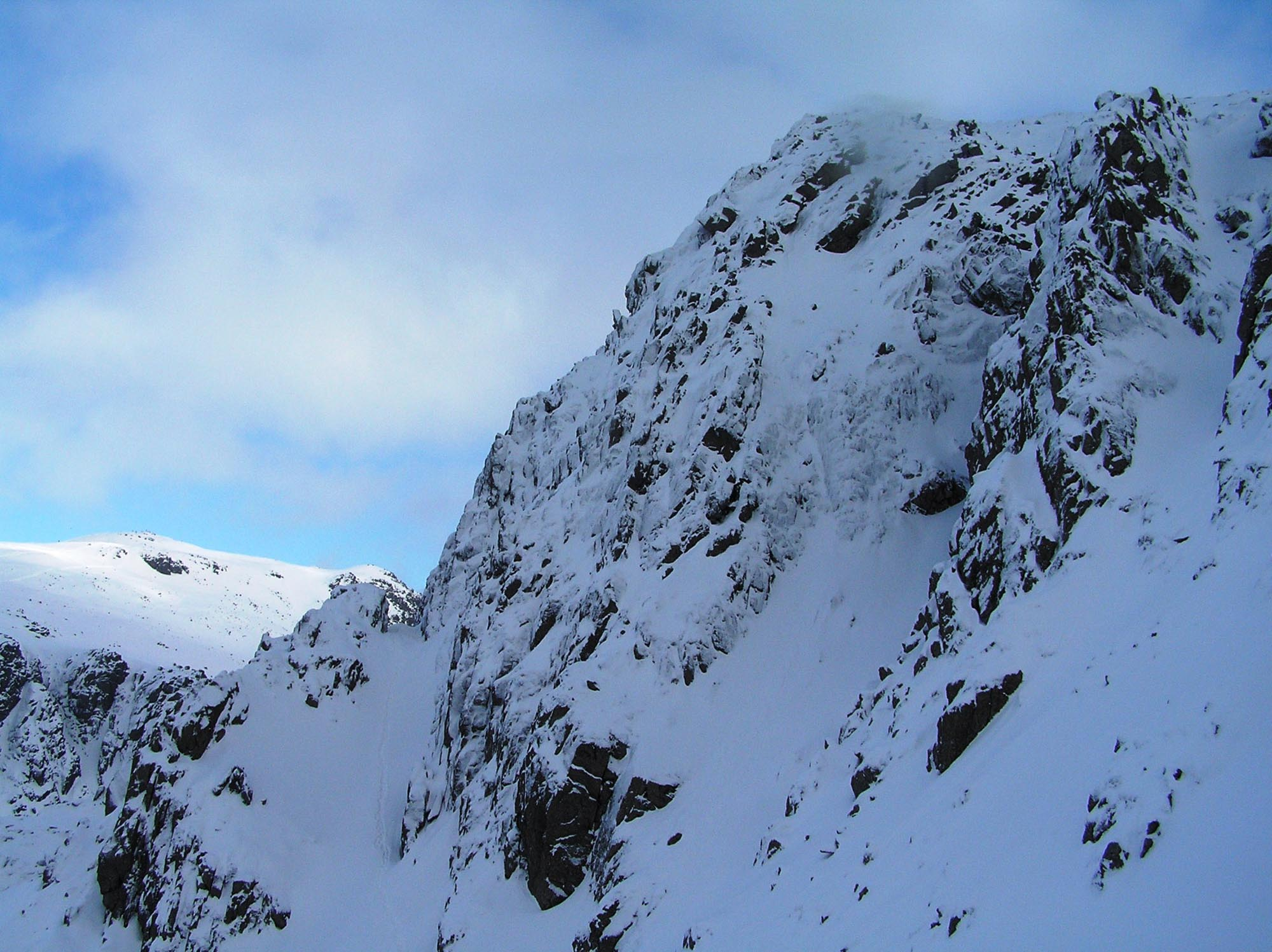
Scafell Crag with Lord's Rake on the left.

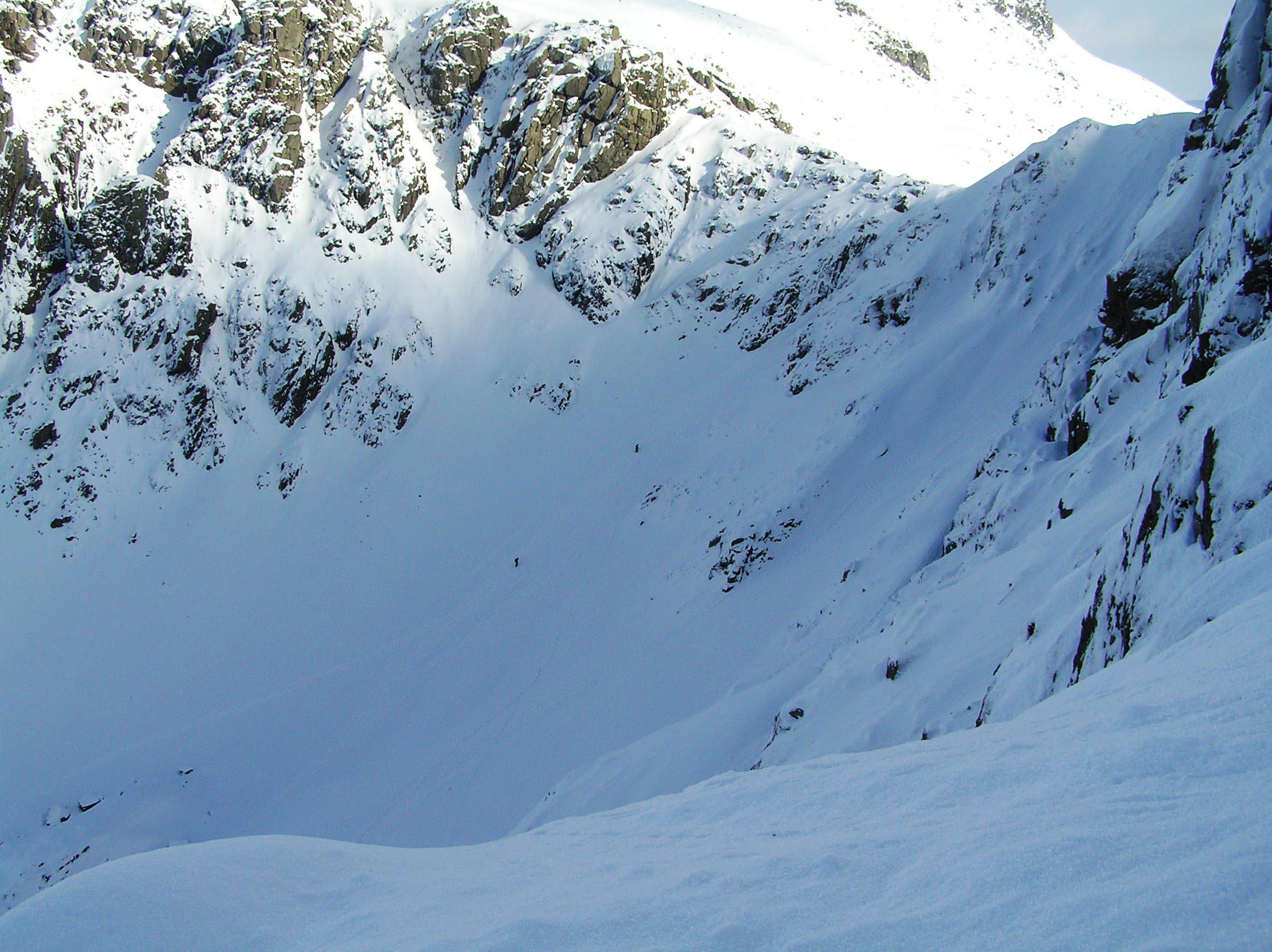
The ascent from Wasdale to Mickledore (on the right)

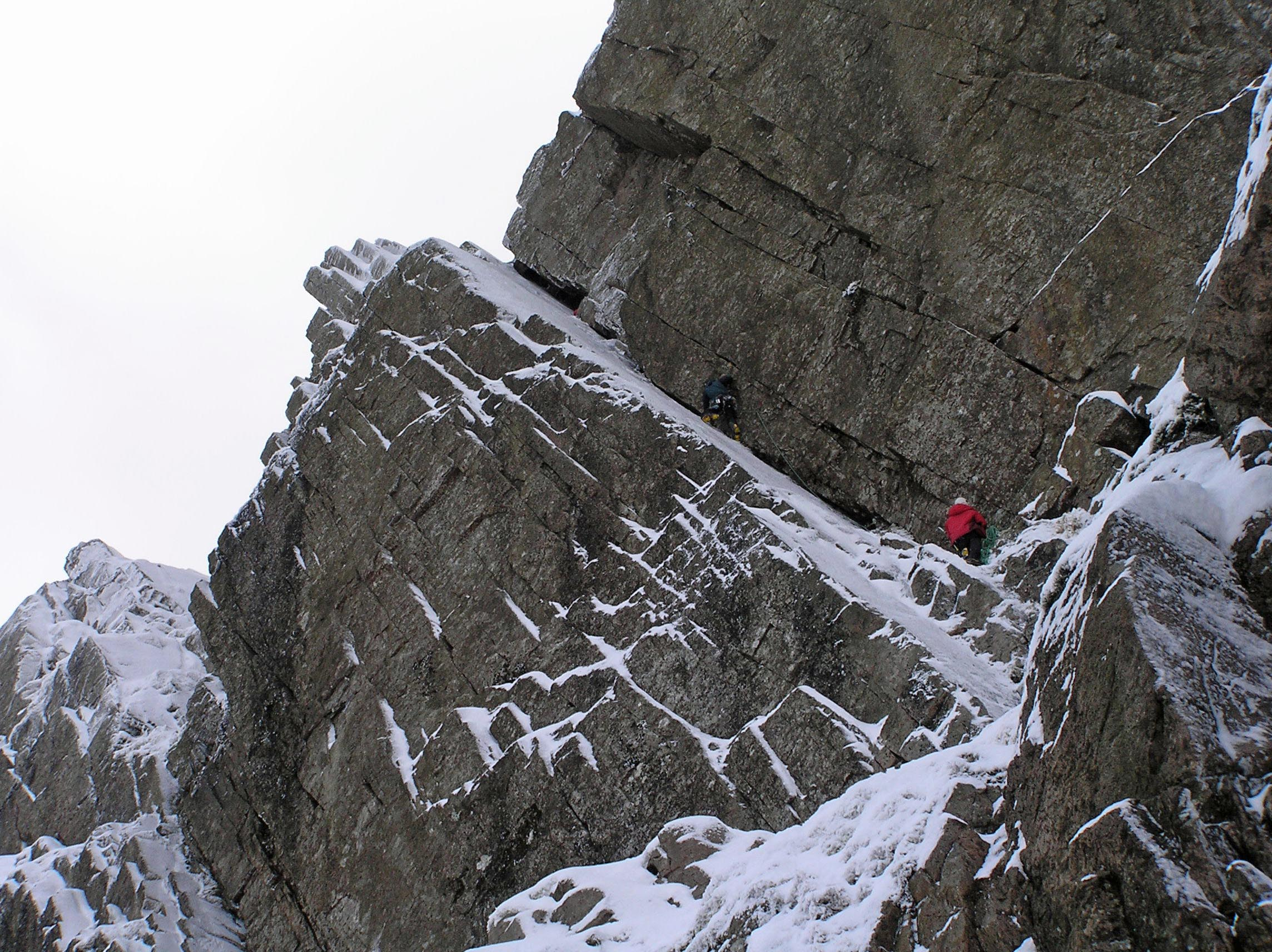
Botterill's slab on Scafell Crag, first climbed in 1903.
