= Scafell Pike =

Highest mountain in England

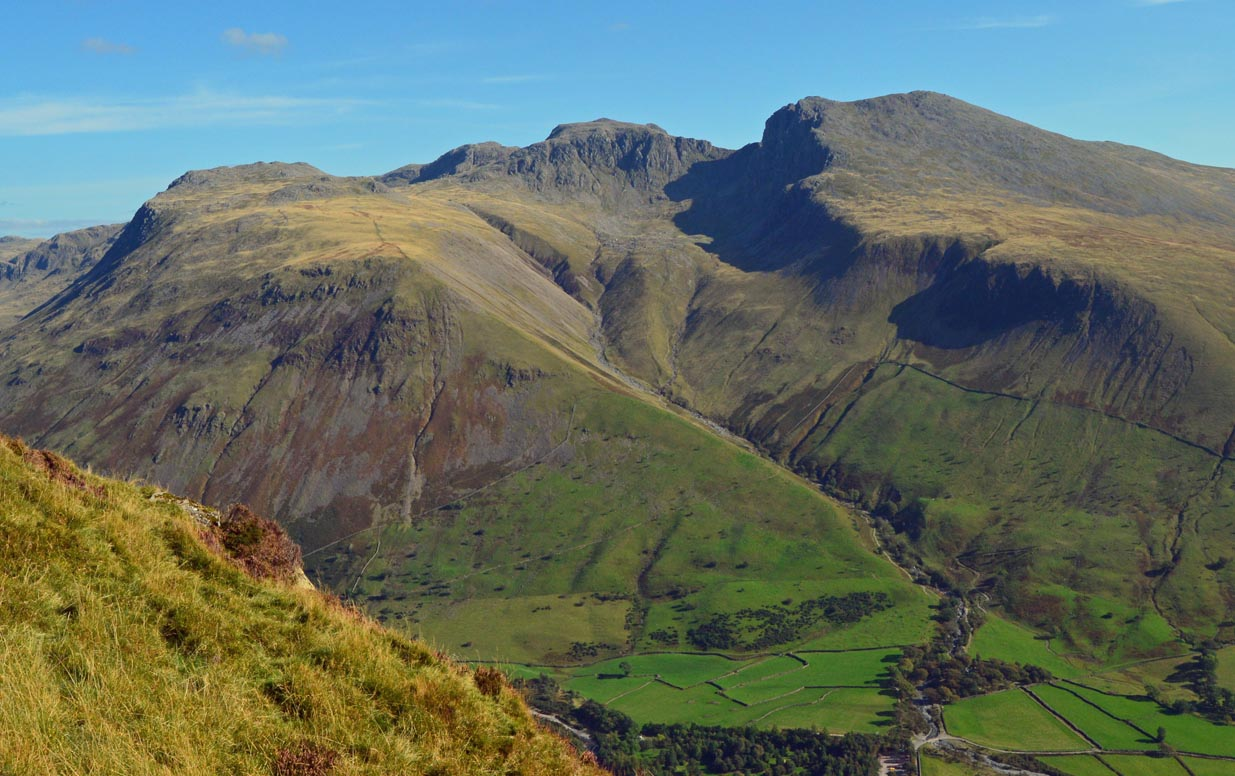
- Scafell Pike (centre) from Yewbarrow

Highest point
- Elevation: 978 m (3,209 ft)
- Prominence: 912 m (2,992 ft); Ranked 13th in British Isles
- Parent peak: Snowdon
- Isolation: 151.98 km (94.44 mi)
- Listing: Marilyn, Hewitt, Hardy, Wainwright, Nuttall, Furth, County Top, Country high point
- Coordinates: 54°27′15″N 3°12′42″W

Geography
- Location within the Lake District Location within the former Borough of Copeland Location within England
- Location: Lake District National Park, Cumbria, England
- Parent range: Cumbrian Mountains, Southern Fells
- OS grid: NY215072
- Topo map: OS Landrangers 89, 90, Explorer OL6

Scafell Pike (/ˈskɔːfɛl/) is a mountain in the Lake District region of Cumbria, England, but traditionally in the historic county of Cumberland. It has an elevation of 978 metres (3,209 ft) above sea level, making it the highest and the most prominent mountain in England. The mountain is part of the Scafell massif, an extinct volcano, and is one of the Southern Fells.

== Etymology and name history ==
The name Scafell (first recorded in 1578 in the corrupt form Skallfeild) most probably derives from the Old Norse skalla fjall, meaning "bald head mountain". Alternatively, the first element could be skáli, "shieling", or skál, "bowl".

The name originally referred to Scafell, which neighbours Scafell Pike. What are now known as Scafell Pike, Ill Crag, and Broad Crag were collectively called either the Pikes (peaks) or the Pikes of Scawfell (see below regarding spelling); from many angles, Scafell seems to be the highest peak, and the others were thus considered subsidiary to it. The name Scawfell Pikes was adopted "by common consent" according to Jonathan Otley, shortly before the publication of the 4th edition of his guidebook in 1830. Up to this point, England's highest mountain (its status as such was not known until the early 1800s) did not have a name of its own; it was labelled Sca-Fell Higher Top by the Ordnance Survey in their initial work in Cumbria in the first decade of the 19th century. The newly developed name reported by Otley first appeared on a published Ordnance Survey map in 1865.

Formerly the name was spelled Scawfell, which better reflects local pronunciation. (Note: These references on spelling of "Scafell"/"Scawfell" are examples of the more common usage during the 19th century and the early part of the 20th century, as can readily be found in the many contemporary guidebooks and local and national newspapers. A useful contrast is the difference in Baddely's guide (1st edn. 1888 and many later editions) between the guide text ("Scafell", following the maps used in this common guide-book) and all the adverts therein of hotels, tours and views, which were placed by local businesses ("Scawfell").) This spelling has declined due to the Ordnance Survey's use of Scafell on their 1865 map and thereafter.

== Topography ==
Scafell Pike is one of a horseshoe of high fells, open to the south, surrounding the head of Eskdale, Cumbria. It stands on the western side of the cirque, with Scafell to the south and Great End to the north. This ridge forms the watershed between Eskdale and Wasdale, which lies to the west.

The narrowest definition of Scafell Pike begins at the col of Mickledore 831.6 m (2,728 ft) in the south, takes in the wide, stony summit area and ends at the next depression, Broad Crag Col, c. 877.6 m (2,879 ft). A more inclusive view takes in two further tops: Broad Crag, 935.3 m (3,069 ft) and Ill Crag, 930.9 m (3,054 ft), the two being separated by Ill Crag Col, 882.3 m (2,895 ft). This is the position taken by most guidebooks. North of Ill Crag is the more definite depression of Calf Cove at 853.4 m (2,800 ft), before the ridge climbs again to Great End, 909.5 m (2,984 ft).

Scafell Pike also has outliers on either side of the ridge. Lingmell 807 m (2,648 ft), to the north west, is invariably regarded as a separate fell, while Pen, 760 metres (2,490 ft), a shapely summit above the Esk, is normally taken as a satellite of the Pike. Middleboot Knotts is a further top lying on the Wasdale slopes of Broad Crag, which is listed as a Nuttall.

The rough summit plateau is fringed by crags on all sides with Pikes Crag and Dropping Crag above Wasdale and Rough Crag to the east. Below Rough Crag and Pen is a further tier, named Dow Crag and Central Pillar on Ordnance Survey maps, although known as Esk Buttress among climbers.

Broad Crag Col is the source of Little Narrowcove Beck in the east and of Piers Gill in the west. The latter works its way around Lingmell to Wast Water through a spectacular ravine, one of the most impressive in the Lake District. It is dangerous in rain and treacherous in winter, as when it freezes over it creates an icy patch, with lethal exposure should you slip. Several accidents and some deaths have occurred in Piers Gill.

Broad Crag is a small top with its principal face on the west and the smaller Green Crag looking down on Little Narrowcove. From Broad Crag, the ridge turns briefly east across Ill Crag Col and onto the shapely pyramidal summit of Ill Crag. Ill Crag and its associated crags overlook Eskdale.

Scafell Pike has a claim to the highest standing water body in England in Broad Crag Tarn, which (confusingly) is on Scafell Pike proper, rather than on Broad Crag. It lies at about 820 m (2,690 ft), a quarter of a mile (400 m) south of the summit. Foxes Tarn on Scafell is of comparable height.

=== Mountain classification ===
Scafell Pike is a Marilyn summit which automatically makes it a HuMP and a TuMP. Scafell Pike is topologically unusual because the Marilyn qualification contour ("Maquaco") line, 150 metres below the summit, passes around Scafell, which is itself a HuMP. This contour also encloses three other TuMP summits: Broad Crag, Ill Crag and Great End.

== Summit ==
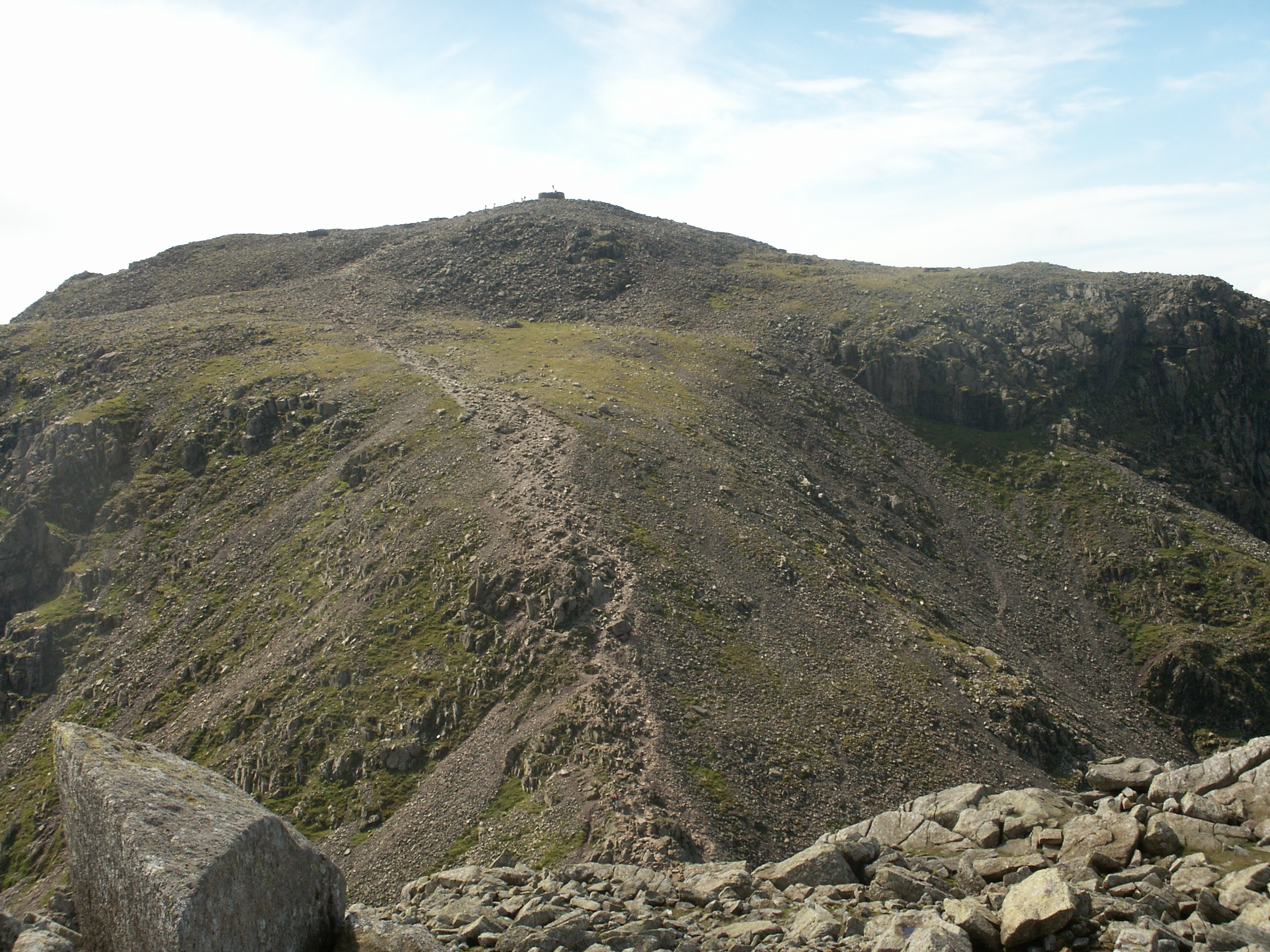
The summit of Scafell Pike, seen from neighbouring Broad Crag

The summit was donated to the National Trust in 1919 by Lord Leconfield "in perpetual memory of the men of the Lake District who fell for God and King, for freedom peace and right in the Great War 1914–1918". There is a better-known war memorial on Great Gable, commemorating the members of the Fell & Rock Climbing Club.

The actual height of Scafell Pike is a matter of definition or guesswork. The highest point is buried beneath a massive summit cairn over 3 metres high and it is not known how high the fabric of the mountain rises under the cairn. Traditionally the height was given as a very memorable 3,210 feet (978.4 m). The rounded metric height of 978 metres converts to 3209 feet ±1 ft 8 in.

Scafell Pike is one of three British peaks climbed as part of the National Three Peaks Challenge, and is the highest ground for over 90 miles (145 km).

Listed summits of Scafell Pike
Name	Grid ref	Height	Status
Ill Crag	NY223073	930.9 m (3,054 ft)	Hewitt, Nuttall
Broad Crag	NY218075	935.4 m (3,069 ft)	Hewitt, Nuttall
Middleboot Knotts	NY213080	702.9 m (2,306 ft)	Nuttall

== Geology ==
=== Ordovician and volcanic activity ===
Scafell Pike consists of igneous rock, including breccia, andesite and rhyolite, as well as geothermal tufa, dating from the Ordovician; it is geologically part of the Borrowdale Volcanics and along with the other peaks of the Scafells, forms part of an extinct volcano which was active around 400–450 million years ago.

=== Pleistocene glacial activity ===
The rugged summit of Scafell Pike was shaped by glacial erosion of the Last Glacial Maximum (c. 20 kya), during which the Lake District was overlain by ice sheets with thicknesses of several kilometers.

=== Contemporary weathering ===
The summit plateau of Scafell Pike, and that of other neighbouring peaks, is covered with shattered rock debris which provides the highest-altitude example of a summit boulder field in England. The boulder field is thought to have been caused in part by weathering, such as frost action. Additional factors are also considered to be important; however, opinion varies as to what these may be. James Clifton Ward suggested that weathering with earthquakes as a secondary agent could be responsible, while John Edward Marr and Reginald Aldworth Daly believed that earthquakes were unnecessary and suggested that frost action with other unspecified agents was more likely. To the north of the summit are a number of high altitude gills which flow into Lingmell Beck. These are good examples in Cumbria for this type of gill and are also biologically important due to their species richness.

== Tourism ==
Scafell Pike is a popular destination for walkers. There is open access to Scafell and the surrounding fells, with many walking and rock climbing routes. Paths connect the summit with Lingmell Col to the northwest, Mickledore to the southwest, and Esk Hause to the northeast, and these in turn connect with numerous other paths, giving access to walkers from many directions including Wasdale Head to the west, Seathwaite to the north, Langdale to the east, and Eskdale to the southwest. The shortest route is from Wasdale Head, about 80 metres above sea level, where there is a climbers' hotel, the Wasdale Head Inn, made popular in the Victorian period by Owen Glynne Jones and others. According to the National Trust, as of 2014 there were over 100,000 people per year climbing Scafell Pike from Wasdale Head, many as part of the National Three Peaks Challenge. In 2022, the number reaching the summit by any route was 250,000.

== Survey point ==
Scafell Pike was used in 1826 as a station in the Principal Triangulation of Britain by the Ordnance Survey when they fixed the relative positions of Britain and Ireland. Angles between Slieve Donard in Northern Ireland and Scafell Pike were taken from Snowdon in Wales as were angles between Snowdon and Scafell Pike from Slieve Donard. Given the need for clear weather to achieve these very long-range observations (111 miles (179 km) to Slieve Donard), the Ordnance surveyors spent much of the summer camped on the respective mountain tops. Scafell Pike was not used as a station in the earlier part of the Principal Triangulation of Britain, even though Sca-Fell formed one corner of a Principal Triangle. (Note: Absence of angles taken from one corner of some triangles was attributed to difficulties of access in the preface of the 1811 report by the Ordnance Survey.) The Ordnance Survey's high precision theodolite was not taken to the summit until 1841.

== Views from the summit ==
=== Summer ===
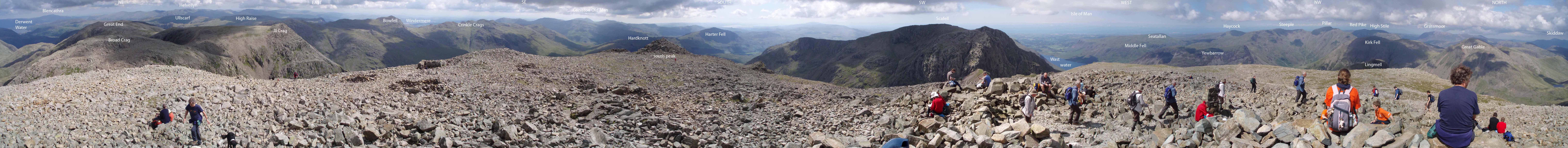
A panorama from the summit of Scafell Pike, August 2007

(Scroll left or right)

=== Winter ===
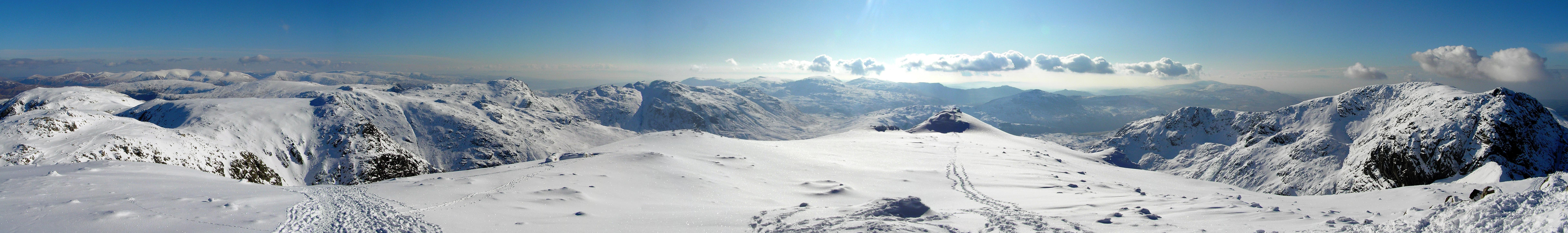
Panorama of the arc from Helvellyn to Scafell in the snow of 2010. The south summit of Scafell Pike is in the foreground.

=== List of summits visible ===
As the highest ground in England, Scafell Pike has a very extensive view, ranging from the Mourne Mountains in Northern Ireland to Snowdonia in Wales. On a clear day, the following prominent mountain tops (Marilyns) can be seen the summit.

- Dun Rig, 77 miles (124 km), 2 degrees
- Binsey, 18 miles (29 km), 2 degrees
- Turner Cleuch Law, 71 miles (114 km), 4 degrees
- Dale Head, 5 miles (8.0 km), 5 degrees
- Wisp Hill, 58 miles (93 km), 11 degrees
- Skiddaw, 14 miles (23 km), 12 degrees
- Roan Fell, 55 miles (89 km), 15 degrees
- Knott, 17 miles (27 km), 17 degrees
- Peel Fell, 63 miles (101 km), 24 degrees
- Blencathra, 14 miles (23 km), 28 degrees
- The Cheviot, 83 miles (134 km), 31 degrees
- Cold Fell, 39 miles (63 km), 39 degrees
- Howgill Fells, 29 miles (47 km), 103 degrees
- Bow Fell, 2 miles (3 km), 105 degrees
- Yorkshire Three Peaks, 36, 44 and 38 miles (58, 71 and 61 km), 119 degrees
- Boulsworth Hill, 63 miles (101 km), 135 degrees
- Pendle Hill, 55 miles (89 km), 138 degrees
- Ward's Stone, 38 miles (61 km), 142 degrees
- The Old Man of Coniston, 7 miles (11 km), 149 degrees
- Winter Hill, 64 miles (103 km), 154 degrees
- Snaefell, 52 miles (84 km), 257 degrees
- Slieve Donard, 111 miles (179 km), 262 degrees
- Slieve Croob, 112 miles (180 km), 268 degrees
- Beneraird, 80 miles (130 km), 303 degrees
- Merrick, 69 miles (111 km), 315 degrees
- Pillar, 4 miles (6 km), 318 degrees
- Cairnsmore of Carsphairn, 68 miles (109 km), 326 degrees
- High Stile, 6 miles (10 km), 328 degrees
- Criffel, 37 miles (60 km), 334 degrees
- Grasmoor, 8 miles (13 km), 342 degrees
- Great Gable, 2 miles (3.2 km), 351 degrees

== See also ==
- Ben Nevis
- Geology of the United Kingdom
- Langdale axe industry
- List of mountains and hills of the United Kingdom
- List of fells in the Lake District
- Snowdon
