= Ill Crag =

Fell in the Lake District, Cumbria, England

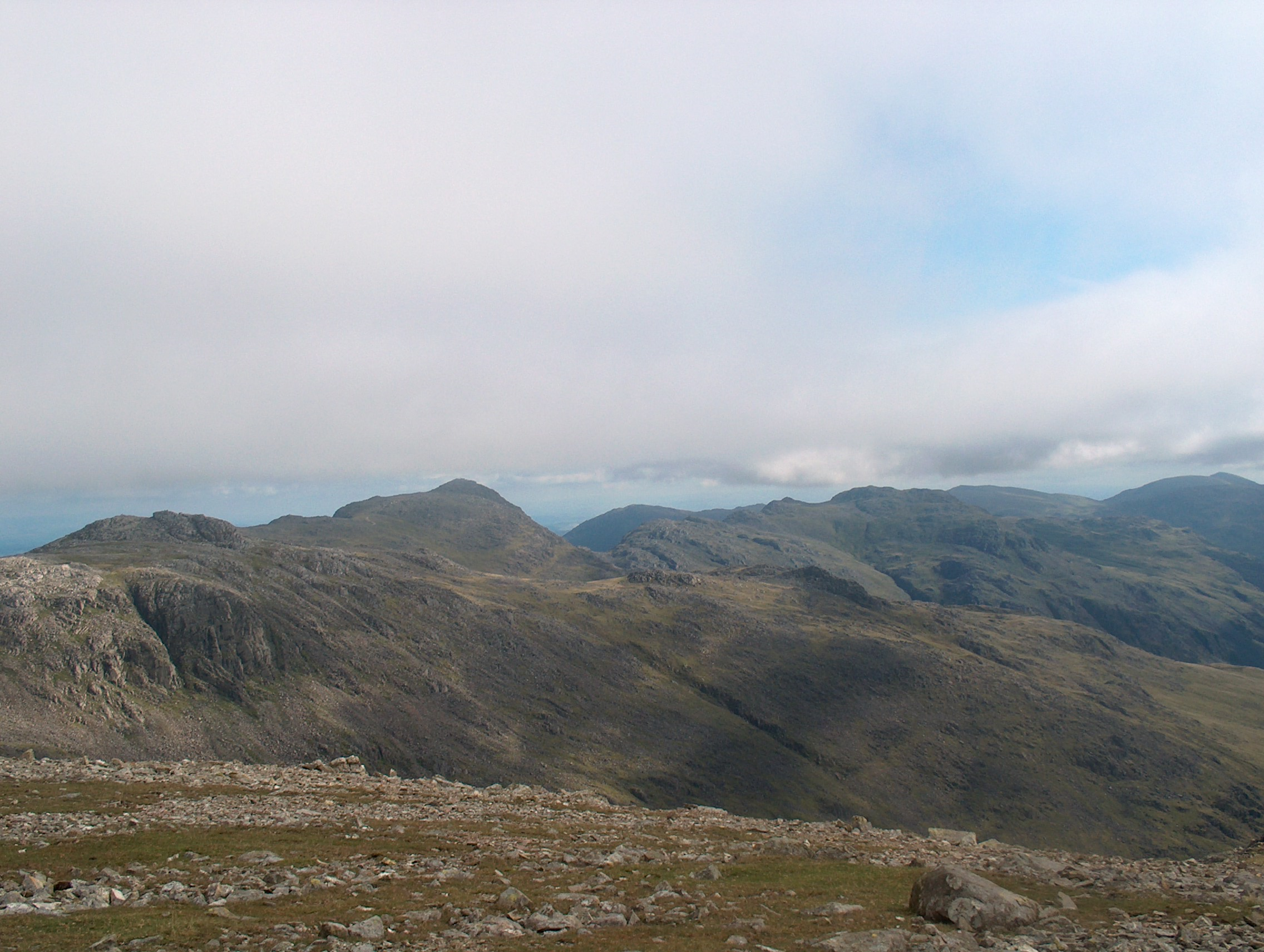
- On the Ill Crag plateau

Highest point
- Elevation: 935 m (3,068 ft)
- Prominence: 57 m (187 ft)
- Parent peak: Scafell Pike
- Listing: Hewitt, Nuttall
- Coordinates: 54°27′18″N 3°12′00″W

Geography
- Location within the Lake District
- Location: Lake District, England
- Parent range: Southern Fells
- OS grid: NY223073
- Topo map: OS Landrangers 89, 90

Climbing
- Easiest route: From Esk Hause

Ill Crag is a fell in the English Lake District. At 935 metres (3,068 ft), it is the fourth-highest peak in England, after Scafell Pike, Sca Fell, and Helvellyn. Ill Crag overlooks Eskdale and has splendid views across to Bowfell and Crinkle Crags.

== Topography ==
It forms part of the Scafell chain, and lies about 1 km east of Scafell Pike. Broad Crag lies immediately to the west, between Ill Crag and the Pike.

== Ascents ==
Ill Crag may be climbed en route to Scafell Pike, via a path from Esk Hause, but it is commonly passed by without going to the actual summit, which is rocky making progress slow. Ill Crag's summit is a few hundred metres to the south of the path from Esk Hause to Scafell Pike.
