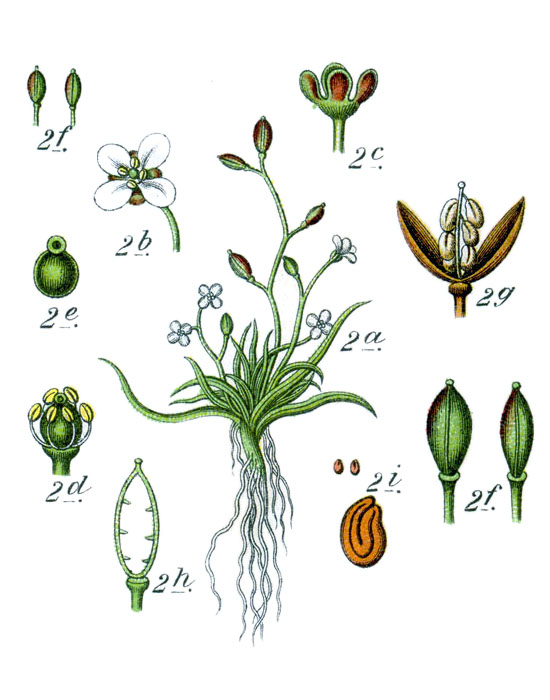
- Illustration of Subularia aquatica

Conservation status
- Secure (NatureServe)

Scientific classification
- Kingdom: Plantae
- Clade: Tracheophytes
- Clade: Angiosperms
- Clade: Eudicots
- Clade: Rosids
- Order: Brassicales
- Family: Brassicaceae
- Genus: Subularia
- Species: S. aquatica

Binomial name
- Subularia aquatica L.

= Subularia aquatica =

Species of aquatic plant

Subularia aquatica is an aquatic plant in the family Brassicaceae which is known by the common name water awlwort. This is a small herb with awl-like leaves (generally cylindrical but tapering to a sharp point), and growing from a corm above a network of bright white roots. Tiny flowers, each only about a millimeter long, are borne on stalks. Flowers which rise above the surface of the water open, while those that remain submersed stay closed and self-pollinate. The seeds come inside tiny inflated pods. There are two varieties of water awlwort; S. a. var. aquatica is native to Eurasia and S. a. var. americana is native to northern North America. There may also be a Mexican subspecies. This plant grows in ponds, marshes, peat bogs, and other shallow, cold water bodies, often in gravel or sand.

== Distribution ==
Native

Palearctic:

Siberia: West Siberia
Soviet Far East: Kamchatka Oblast
Northern Europe: Denmark, Finland, Iceland, Kaliningrad, Norway, Sweden, United Kingdom
Middle Europe: Belgium, Germany
East Europe: Belarus, Central Russia, Central Black Earth, Northern Russia, North Caucasus, Northwestern Russia, Volga, Urals, Volga-Vyatka
Southeastern Europe: Bulgaria
Southwestern Europe: France, Spain

Nearctic:

Subarctic America: Northwest Territories, Yukon Territory, Greenland, Alaska
Eastern Canada: Newfoundland and Labrador, Nova Scotia, Ontario, Quebec
Western Canada: British Columbia, Manitoba, Saskatchewan
Northeastern United States: Maine, New Hampshire, New York, Vermont
North-Central United States: Minnesota
Northwestern United States: Idaho, Montana, Washington, Wyoming
Southwestern United States: California, Utah
