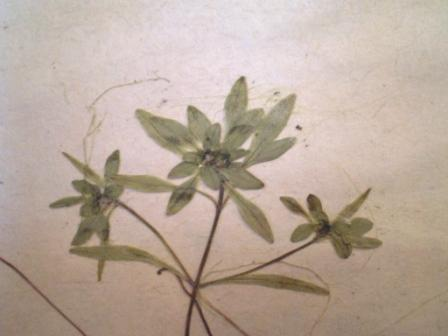

Scientific classification
- Kingdom: Plantae
- Clade: Tracheophytes
- Clade: Angiosperms
- Clade: Eudicots
- Clade: Asterids
- Order: Lamiales
- Family: Plantaginaceae
- Genus: Callitriche
- Species: C. hamulata

Binomial name
- Callitriche hamulata Kütz. ex W.D.J. Koch

Synonyms
- Synonyms: Callitriche aquatica subsp. hamulata (Kütz. ex W.D.J.Koch) Bonnier & Layens; Callitriche autumnalis var. brutia Kütz.; Callitriche autumnalis var. calophylla Kütz.; Callitriche autumnalis var. goldbachii Kütz.; Callitriche autumnalis f. halleri Kütz.; Callitriche autumnalis var. heterophylla Kütz.; Callitriche autumnalis var. lacustris Kütz.; Callitriche autumnalis var. minuta Kütz.; Callitriche autumnalis var. platyphylla Kütz.; Callitriche brutia subsp. hamulata (Kütz. ex W.D.J.Koch) O.Bolòs & Vigo; Callitriche brutia var. hamulata (Kütz. ex W.D.J.Koch) Lansdown; Callitriche connata Raf.; Callitriche decussata Schur [Illegitimate]; Callitriche genuina Ducommun; Callitriche hamulata var. autumnalis Nyman; Callitriche hamulata var. homoiophylla Godr.; Callitriche intermedia Hoffm.; Callitriche intermedia subsp. hamulata (Kütz. ex W.D.J.Koch) Clapham; Callitriche longifolia (Hill) Druce; Callitriche pallens M.Bieb.; Callitriche reflexa Lange ex Cutanda; Callitriche tenuifolia Fr.; Stellina hamulata Bubani

= Callitriche hamulata =

Species of flowering plant

Callitriche hamulata is a species of flowering plant belonging to the family Plantaginaceae.

== Description ==
It is a submerged plant with slender, branching stems about 20–70 cm (8–28 in) long. The light green, narrow leaves are up to 6 cm (2 in) long and 1-2mm wide, slightly broadening at the tip. The leaves which can float on top of the water, are shorter and wider, they are also light brownish or pinkish green. It has tiny inconspicuous green flowers and fruits, and has a flowering period of between May and October. or between April and September in the UK.

== Taxonomy ==
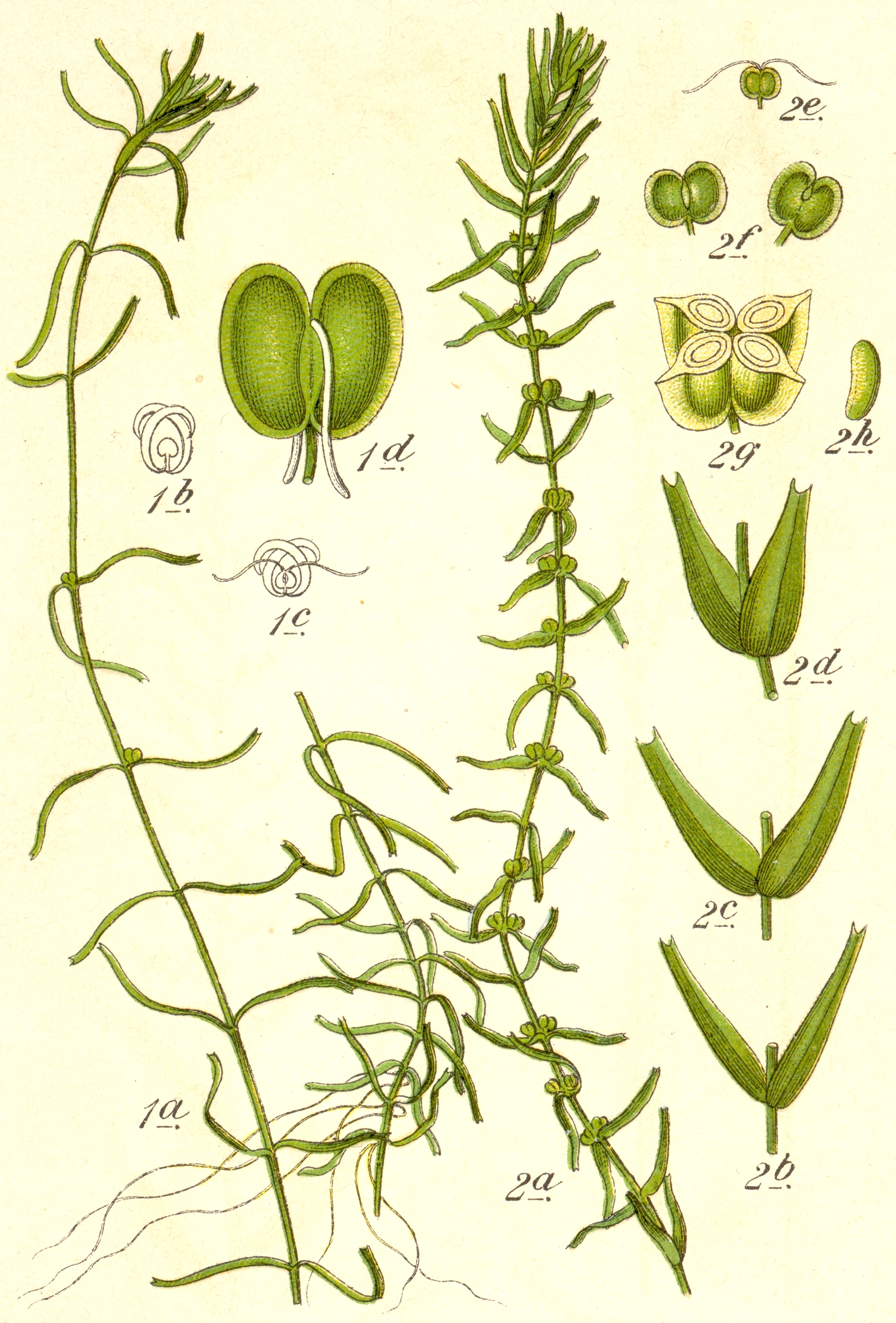
Figure from Deutschlands Flora in Abbildungen, illustrated by Johann Georg Sturm

It was then described by Wilhelm Daniel Joseph Koch before being widely published by Friedrich Traugott Kützing in 'Synopsis Florae Germanicae et Helveticae' Collection 246 in 1837.

The Latin specific epithet hamulata is derived from hamatus meaning "with hooks" or "hooked", referring to the hooked end of the leaves.

== Distribution ==
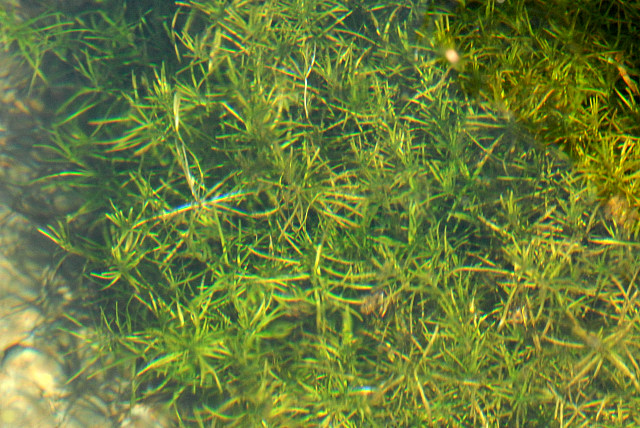
Photo from High Ardennes, Belgium

Callitriche hamulata is native to a wide area, which stretches from Greenland, and Iceland, through Europe to North-western Africa.

It is widespread and fairly frequent in Britain, particularly in south eastern England.

== Habitat ==
It is found in rapidly flowing streams, which are well oxygenated, and freshwaters, from sea level to about 1,200 m (3,900 ft) above sea level. This plant can grow in shallow waters and can also adapt to a deeper water level, especially after flooding. It can also be found in or near ponds, ditches, in still or slow moving water.
