= Irton with Santon =

Civil parish in Cumbria, England

Coordinates: 54.4022°N 3.3711°W

- The Bridge and inn at Santon Bridge

- Location in Copeland Borough Location within Cumbria
- Population: 316 (2011)
- Unitary authority: Cumberland
- Ceremonial county: Cumbria
- Region: North West
- Country: England
- Sovereign state: United Kingdom
- Post town: Holmrook
- Postcode district: CA19
- Police: Cumbria
- Fire: Cumbria
- Ambulance: North West
- UK Parliament: Whitehaven and Workington

Irton with Santon is a civil parish in Cumberland, Cumbria, England, which includes the village of Santon Bridge. It has a parish council. It had a population of 373 in 2001, decreasing to 316 at the 2011 Census.

The parish is bordered by the parishes of Gosforth to the north west and west, Eskdale to the east, Muncaster to the south east, and Drigg and Carleton to the south west. Irton Pike is a hill of 751 feet (229 m) included in Wainwright's book The Outlying Fells of Lakeland, and the River Irt flows through the parish, bridged at Santon Bridge. The parish lies within the Lake District National Park, and the only major road is a short stretch of the A595 along the western edge, passing through Holmrook (a village divided between this parish and Drigg and Carleton).

There are 17 listed buildings or structures in the parish. The Church of St Paul and the medieval tower incorporated into Irton Hall are at grade II* and the rest at grade II.

== St Paul's church ==
St Paul's church stands in an isolated position roughly midway between Holmrook and Santon Bridge. It is part of the benefice of Eskdale, Irton, Muncaster and Waberthwaite in the Diocese of Carlisle, and services are held twice a month. The Anglo-Saxon Irton Cross stands in its graveyard; there is a reproduction of it in the Cast Courts of the Victoria and Albert Museum, commissioned by the museum in 1882. A plaque by the font is in memorial to Robert Wilfred Skeffington-Lutwidge who was a commissioner in lunacy. The plaque tells the tragic tale of how he died after being hit on the head by a lunatic. The church was rebuilt in 1857 on the site of an earlier church, by Miles Thompson of Kendal (who also designed Arnside Church) and includes glass by Morris & Co.

== See also ==
- Listed buildings in Irton with Santon
