= Wasdale Screes =

Protected area in Cumbria, England

- Site of Special Scientific Interest
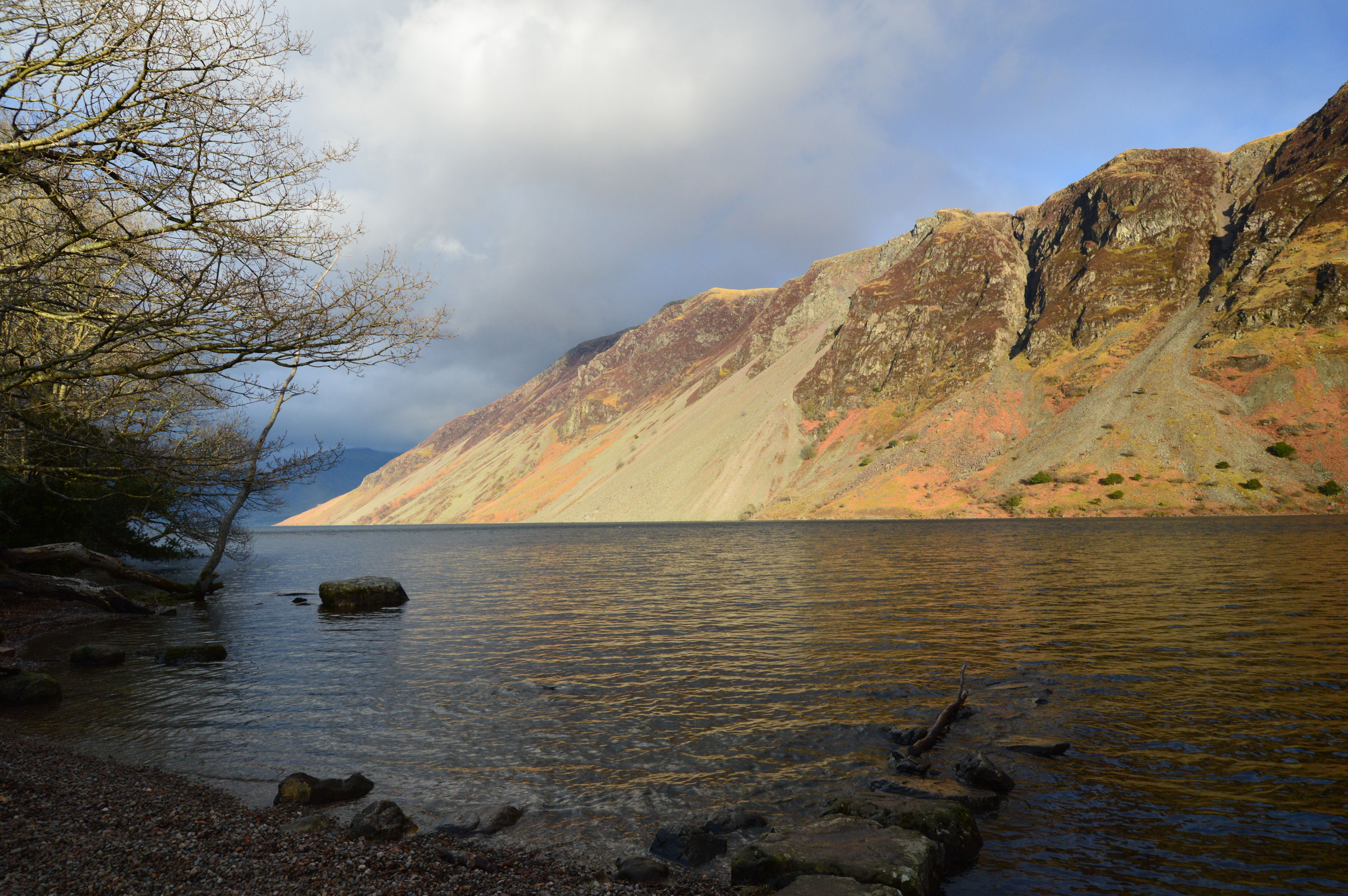

- Location within Cumbria
- Location of Wasdale Screes.
- Area of search: Cumbria
- Coordinates: 54.43°N 3.30°W
- Interest: Geomorphological and botanical importance

Wasdale Screes is a Site of Special Scientific Interest (SSSI) within the Lake District National Park in Cumbria, England. This protected area includes much of the escarpment on the southern margin of the lake called Wast Water, located 3km northeast of the village Santon Bridge. This landscape is protected because of the rare plant species present and the uniqueness of the scree landform.

The scree fields are below the fells of Illgill Head and Whin Rigg, but this protected area does not include these summits.

== Geology ==
Wasdale Screes is a classic example of active disintegration of cliff into unstable scree. It is formed of rocks from the Borrowdale Volcanic Series.

== Biology ==
This protected area has a diversity of montane plants including alpine lady's-mantle, purple saxifrage, mossy saxifrage, mountain everlasting, northern bedstraw and mountain melick. The plant species bearberry, mountain avens and shrubby cinquefoil have also been recorded here. A clubmoss species recorded in this protected area is alpine clubmoss. Over 25 species of fern have been recorded in this protected area including parsely fern, royal fern, moonwort and forked spleenwort.

The bird species buzzard, raven, peregrine and ring ouzel have been recorded in this protected area.

== Land ownership ==
All land within Wasdale Screes SSSI is owned by the National Trust.
