= Ponsonby Fell =

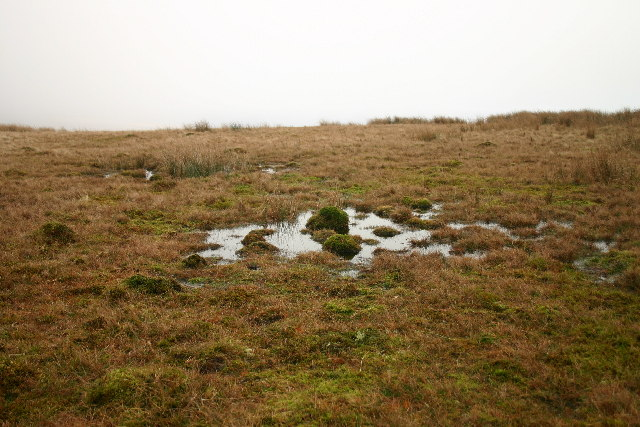
- Sphagnum bog near the summit of Ponsonby Fell

Highest point
- Elevation: 315 m (1,033 ft)
- Prominence: 34 m (112 ft)
- Parent peak: Pillar
- Listing: Tump, Birkett, Synge, Outlying Fell
- Coordinates: 54°27′02″N 3°25′05″W

Geography
- Location within the Lake District
- Location: Lake District, England
- OS grid: NY082070
- Topo map: OS Outdoor Leisure 6

Ponsonby Fell is a hill in the west of the English Lake District, near Gosforth, in Cumberland, Cumbria. It is the subject of a chapter of Wainwright's book The Outlying Fells of Lakeland. It reaches 1,020 feet (310 m), and Wainwright's route is an anticlockwise horseshoe starting at Gosforth, following the River Bleng before striking north for the summit, then descending to Wellington from where he recommends taking a bus back to Gosforth rather than walk along the A595 road ("it is busy, dangerous, and has no footpath").

Wainwright says: "There are no fells not worth climbing, but Ponsonby Fell is very nearly in their category", and describes the summit as "attained with a conviction that nobody has ever been there before", which conviction is then contradicted by the presence of a small cairn.
