= Listed buildings in Irton with Santon =

Irton with Santon is a civil parish in the Cumberland district, Cumbria, England. It contains 17 listed buildings that are recorded in the National Heritage List for England. Of these, two are listed at Grade II*, the middle of the three grades, and the others are at Grade II, the lowest grade. The parish is in the Lake District National Park. It contains the villages of Irton and Santon Bridge, and is otherwise rural. In the parish is the country house of Irton Hall, which incorporates a medieval tower house, and also has a clock tower; all of these are listed. The other listed buildings include houses, farmhouses, farm buildings, a church with a memorial in its churchyard, two bridges, a summer house, and an inn.

== Key ==
Grade	Criteria
II*	Particularly important buildings of more than special interest
II	Buildings of national importance and special interest

== Buildings ==
Name and location	Photograph	Date	Notes	Grade
Medieval tower, Irton Hall; 54.39277°N 3.38026°W	—	14th century	A fortified tower house, later incorporated into a country house built in 1874. It is in granite with carved sandstone dressings, moulded eaves, an overhanging embattled parapet, and a hipped lead roof. There are four storeys and two irregular bays. The windows vary; some are original with carved hood moulds, and others date from the late 19th century. Inside is a tunnel vault.	II*
Craghouse Bridge; 54.41049°N 3.38081°W		18th century (probable)	The bridge carries a road over the River Irt. It is in stone, and consists of a single segmental arch with a span of about 30 feet (9.1 m). The roadway is 6.5 feet (2.0 m) wide, and it has a parapet 3 feet (0.91 m) high with flat copings and splayed ends.	II
Greenlands; 54.39768°N 3.40334°W	—	18th century	A large house that was extended in about 1820, it is stuccoed with corner pilasters, a cornice, a blocking course, and a slate roof, hipped at the north and with coping to the south. There are two storeys and five bays. The windows are sashes in architraves, and at the rear is a large stair window.	II
Bower House Inn and walls 54.39063°N 3.33974°W		1751	The inn is roughcast and has slate roofs with a stone ridge. It has a T-shaped plan, two storeys, and a front of five bays. There is a porch with a cornice, above the door is a dated and inscribed lintel, and the windows are sashes. On each side of the porch is a low wall with chamfered coping.	II
Hall Santon farmhouse 54.39933°N 3.38584°W	—	Mid to late 18th century	Wings were added to the farmhouse in about 1830. The house is stuccoed, with rusticated quoins on the original part, and corner pilasters on the wings. There are two storeys and five bays. There is a central doorway, most of the windows are sashes, with one casement window in each wing, and all the openings have stone surrounds.	II
Barn, Greenlands; 54.39775°N 3.40297°W	—	1772	The barn is in stone with quoins and a slate roof with a stone ridge. There are two storeys, six bays, and outshuts at the rear. It contains an elliptical-headed wagon entrance, two cart entrances with a window above, three doors and four windows to the right, and two loft doors above.	II
Holmbrook Hall Bridge; 54.38841°N 3.41382°W		Late 18th century	The bridge carries a road over the River Irt, and may incorporate earlier fabric. It is partly in sandstone and partly in brick. The bridge consists of a single slightly pointed arch with abutments, a chamfered drip mould, and parapets with ashlar copings.	II
Memorial to servants 54.39155°N 3.40087°W	—	Late 18th or early 19th century	The memorial to servants of Irton Hall is in the churchyard of St Paul's Church. It is in stone, square, and about 6 feet (1.8 m) high. It has a moulded plinth, and a moulded block inscribed with the names of the servants in panelled frames. On top is a cornice and a splayed block with a fluted finial.	II
Kennels and stables, Greenlands; 54.39791°N 3.40273°W	—	c. 1820	The kennels and stables are in sandstone and have a slate roof with a stone ridge. They are in a single storey and have a linear plan, with three kennels to the left, a taller tack room in the centre, and three stables to the right. Each section has a plank door, and a sash window. In front of each kennel is a dog run surrounded by rubble walls with wrought iron railings and a gate.	II
Cottage, Hall Santon farm 54.39943°N 3.38556°W	—	1827	The cottage is in stone with quoins, overhanging eaves, and a slate roof with a stone ridge. There are two storeys and two bays, and a single-storey single-bay scullery to the south. Above the door is a dated lintel. The doorway and windows have stone surrounds.	II
Barn and gin gang, Hall Santon farm 54.39923°N 3.38527°W	—	1847	The buildings are in stone with sandstone dressings and slate roofs. The barn has chamfered eaves, a stone ridge, and two vents. There are 2 1/2 storeys, five bays, and a rear wing, and the barn incorporates a dovecote. The openings include doorways, windows, loft doors, dovecote holes, ventilation slits, and owl holes in the gables. To the north of the rear wing is a gin gang with a semicircular plan.	II
Cart shed, Hall Santon farm 54.39893°N 3.38548°W	—	Mid 19th century (probable)	The cart shed is in stone with quoins, and has a slate roof with a stone ridge. There are two storeys, and it has a symmetrical three-bay front, with three elliptical-headed cart entrances, a plank door, and fixed windows.	II
Miteside; 54.37300°N 3.38625°W	—	Mid 19th century (probable)	A pebbledashed house on a chamfered plinth, with rusticated quoins, an eaves band, a cast iron gutter with lions' heads, and a hipped slate roof. There are two storeys and a symmetrical front of three bays. In the centre is a semicircular porch, and the windows are sashes in stone surrounds.	II
St Paul's Church; 54.39156°N 3.40060°W		1857	Rebuilt on the site of a previous church and designed by Miles Thompson, a north vestry was added in 1866, and this was rebuilt in 1872 when William White also extended the chancel. The church is pebbledashed on a chamferd plinth, and has stone dressings, stepped buttresses, a chamfered eaves string course on corbels, and slate roofs with terracotta ridge tiles, stone copings, and apex crosses. It consists of a nave with a north porch, a chancel with a north vestry, and a west tower. The tower has three stages, there is a taller octagonal stair tower to the north, and both have embattled parapets.	II*
Irton Hall (Main House); 54.39263°N 3.38040°W		1874	A country house, designed by G. E. Grayson, added to and incorporating earlier features. It is in granite and sandstone on a chamfered plinth, with quoins, moulded eaves with corner gargoyles, an embattled parapet, and a hipped slate roof. There are two storeys and an entrance front of three bays. On the front is a full-height porch and a door with decorative ironwork. The garden front is long and varied, and the windows are mullioned and transomed.	II
Clock tower, Irton Hall; 54.39306°N 3.37988°W		1874	Designed by G. E. Grayson, the clock tower is in stone with a slate roof, and there is an adjoining single-storey building. The tower has four stages, with rusticated corbels carrying the parapet. On the top is a buttressed open timber bellcote with a swept pyramidal roof and a weathervane.	II
Pagoda and railings 54.39980°N 3.37654°W	—	Early 20th century (probable)	A wooden summer house with oak posts and corbelled brackets supporting a swept felt roof with a ball finial. The doorway and windows have triangular heads, and a bench runs round the interior. The area is surrounded by wrought iron railings with ball heads, standing on a low stone wall.	II
