= Middle Fell =

Mountain in United Kingdom

- Location within the Lake District Location within the former Borough of Copeland

Highest point
- Elevation: 582 m (1,909 ft)
- Prominence: 117 m (384 ft)
- Listing: Wainwright
- Coordinates: 54°27′14″N 3°18′40″W

Geography
- Location: Cumbria, England
- Parent range: Lake District, Western Fells
- OS grid: NY151072
- Topo map: OS Landranger 89, 90, Explorer OL6

Middle Fell is a hill or fell in the English Lake District. It is a satellite of Seatallan standing above the northern shore of Wastwater. Middle Fell can be climbed from Greendale near the foot of Wastwater, and a fine view of the lake backed by the Wastwater Screes is visible from the summit.

== Topography ==
The Western Fells occupy a triangular sector of the Lake District, bordered by the River Cocker to the north east and Wasdale to the south east. Westwards the hills diminish toward the coastal plain of Cumberland. At the central hub of the high country are Great Gable and its satellites, while two principal ridges fan out on either flank of Ennerdale, the western fells in effect being a great horseshoe around this long wild valley. Middle Fell is an outlier of the southern arm.

The main watershed runs broadly westwards from Great Gable, dividing the headwaters of Ennerdale and Wasdale. Travelling in this direction the principal hills are Kirk Fell, Pillar, Scoat Fell, Haycock and Caw Fell. Haycock sends out a long southern ridge terminating in Seatallan and Seatallan in turn has a south eastern spur. This is Middle Fell.

Middle Fell begins at the unnamed col on the eastern face of Seatallan at a height of 1,525 ft (465 m). This is its only connection with other high ground, being constrained on three sides by deep valleys. To the west, separating Middle Fell from its parent, is Greendale Gill. This begins at Greendale Tarn, nestled into the steep face of Middle Fell. The tarn, around 30 ft (9 m) deep, sits in a long narrow bowl, looked down on by a collection of huge boulders.

To the east is Nether Beck, flowing down to the Lake through its long valley. On the other side are the long southern slopes of Red Pike. The southern slopes of Middle Fell fall to the shore of Wastwater, claiming a long section of the northern shore between Nether Beck Bridge and the Greendale road junction. Goat Gill and Smithy Beck provide further drainage on this side.

Middle Fell is steep on all sides. The western face is rough with areas of scree and boulders, but generally free of crags. The longer eastern slopes by contrast have tier upon tier of rocks. Long, Water, Goat, Foegill and Iron Crags are the principal features. The ridge northward to Seatallan is broad, levelling out onto grass after an initial rough descent.

== Geology ==
The summit area is composed of the dacitic, welded lapilli tuff of the Lincomb Tarns Formation. Andesitic lapilli tuff occurs on either end of the ridge, together with small intrusions of basalt and dolerite. Underlying this is the Birker Fell Formation of plagioclase-phyric andesite lavas.

== Summit ==
The summit cairn is sited on a small rock outcrop, close to the beginning of the ridge-end descent to the south. The view across Wastwater to the screes of Whin Rigg and Illgill Head is excellent. Also in view is the head of Wasdale and the more distant Coniston Fells. Black Combe appears far off to the south west.

== Ascents ==
The simplest ascent is via a path up the nose of the ridge, beginning at Greendale. A longer alternative climbs the beck to Greendale Tarn before doubling back to the summit along the Seatallan ridge. A circular tour can be contrived via Seatallan and Buckbarrow.
