= Margaret Hogg =

Murder victim (c.1939–1976)

Margaret Hogg (c. 1939 – October 1976) was a manslaughter victim whose body was preserved in Wast Water, Lake District National Park, Cumbria for eight years. Wast Water is England's deepest lake.

== Life and career ==
Margaret Hogg had worked as an airline stewardess and her husband, Peter Hogg, was a pilot. He was 19 years older than she. He had made front-page news on 16 August 1974 when he landed at Luton Airport as the captain of a Lockheed L-1011 Tristar of Court Line that he had piloted overnight from a refuelling stop at Gander, Canada, bringing Clarksons holidaymakers back from St. Lucia. This was the airline's last flight as Court Line had ceased trading the previous day.

== Marital stress, murder and disposal in Wastwater ==
Margaret had a three-year affair with banker Graham Ryan, and often flaunted it before Peter. In October 1976 she attacked her husband, hitting and kicking until he "grabbed her round the neck and squeezed hard". She suffocated and he wrapped her body in a carpet, tied it to a block of concrete, drove north overnight from Surrey and dumped it in Wast Water lake in the Lake District National Park.

The body settled at a depth of 34 metres (110 ft), only a short distance away from much deeper parts of the deepest lake in England. Due to the lack of oxygen the body did not decompose, but over time was preserved by the formation of adipocere.

== Discovery of body ==
In 1983, the lake was searched for the body of Veronique Mireille Marre, a missing French student.

Subsequently, the remains of Margaret Hogg were found tied in the fetal position with co-ax cable with a dry-cleaning bag over her head and the body wrapped in a hessian cover, by a diver, Neil Pritt, on 29 February 1984, who initially thought them to be just a roll of old carpet. Shortly after the recovery, the body was identified by friends. The police investigation was made easier by noting "Margaret 11.11.63 Peter" that was engraved on the inside of the gold wedding ring recovered on the floor of the mortuary at West Cumberland Hospital.

Peter Hogg, the prime suspect, initially denied the murder before making a confession. He was sentenced to four years for manslaughter, obstructing a coroner, and perjury in his divorce proceedings.

=== Veronique Mireille Marre ===
The remains of Veronique Mireille Marre were eventually found in May 1985. Her remains were found on a mountain at the bottom of a cliff, but no cause of death could be officially given.
