= Buckbarrow =

Mountain in Cumbria, England

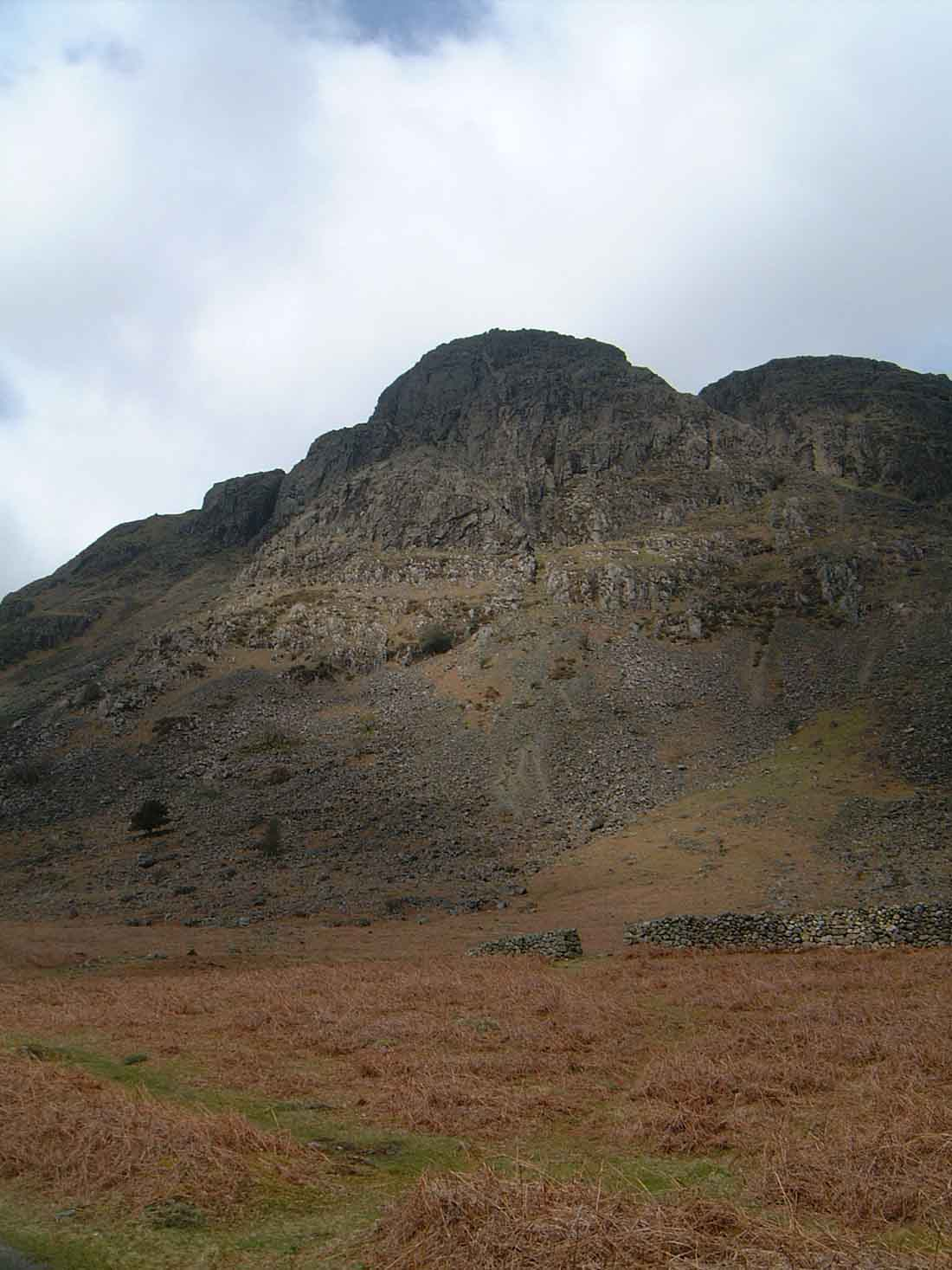
- The cliffs of Buckbarrow are unassailable to walkers and prevent a direct ascent

Highest point
- Elevation: 423 m (1,388 ft)
- Prominence: less than 5 m
- Parent peak: Seatallan
- Listing: Wainwright
- Coordinates: 54°26′31″N 3°20′07″W

Geography
- Location within the Lake District Location within the former Borough of Copeland
- Location: Cumbria, England
- Parent range: Lake District, Western Fells
- OS grid: NY135061
- Topo map: OS Landranger 89, OS Explorer OL6

Buckbarrow is a small fell in the English Lake District overlooking the western end of Wastwater. It is featured in Alfred Wainwright’s Pictorial Guide to the Lakeland Fells and is given a height of 1,410 ft approximately; however, the Ordnance Survey and other guidebooks now give an altitude of 423 m (1,388 ft). The fell’s name means ‘The hill of the buck or goat’. It is derived either from the Old English word bucc meaning buck or the Old Norse word bokki meaning a male goat.

== Topography ==
The Western Fells occupy a triangular sector of the Lake District, bordered by the River Cocker to the north east and Wasdale to the south-east. Westwards the hills diminish toward the coastal plain of Cumberland. At the central hub of the high country are Great Gable and its satellites, while two principal ridges fan out on either flank of Ennerdale, the western fells in effect being a great horseshoe around this long, wild valley. Buckbarrow is an outlier of the southern branch of the horseshoe.

Buckbarrow is not really a separate hill, but just the craggy end of the southern ridge of the neighbouring fell of Seatallan, which reaches a height of 692 m (2,270 ft). Seatallan itself lies to the south of the main ridge, connecting to Haycock across the Pots of Ashness depression.

Seatallan's south-western ridge falls gently at first across the broad green expanse of Nether Wasdale Common, finally narrowing to a point at Cat Bields (500 m or 1,640 ft), a mile from the summit. From here the slope continues in the same direction to the Greendale-Gosforth road, its progress only briefly interrupted by the few desultory rocks of Gray Crag. A smaller spur runs out south from Cat Bields, only resolving into a definite ridge some way down the slope at Glade How (435 m or 1,425 ft). This cairned top is recognised as a summit by some guidebooks. A little to the south of Glade How the spur ends in a wall of crag, dropping 900 ft to the road below. This is Buckbarrow.

Buckbarrow's crags rise above the foot of Wast Water, standing as a rugged, miniature counterpart to the grander fells of the valley. Extending about three-quarters of a mile in length, the principal features of Buckbarrow's southern face are Long Crag, Pike Crag, Bull Crag, and Broad Crag. The western boundary of the fell is formed by Gill Beck, which flows between Buckbarrow and the main ridge of Seatallan. To the east, the crags overlook Greendale Gill, which marks the boundary with Middle Fell.

== Geology ==
The northern parts of Buckbarrow, blending into the slopes of Seatallan, are overlain by drift deposits, much peat being in evidence around Glade How. The summit area shows outcropping of the Birker Fell Formation, an undivided sequence of generally plagioclase-phyric andesite lavas with subordinate sills. At the bottom of the slope are examples of granophyric microgranite, representative of the Ennerdale Intrusion. Dykes of basalt and dolerite run through both formations.

== Summit ==
The nearest to an actual summit given the limited prominence is a rocky mound set back from the rim of crags. Much finer views can be obtained from the lower rocky knoll which stands above Pike Crag. Buckbarrow gives good views of Wast Water as well as the Wast Water Screes. The full length of the lake can be seen from Pike Crag, along with a fine view of Great Gable and the Scafells.

== Ascents ==
The fell is usually climbed from the minor road which runs along the base of the hill. From here Buckbarrow looks quite formidable and the crags are a deterrent to a direct ascent; however, all danger can be bypassed by starting the climb at the more westerly point of Harrow Head farm and following Gill Beck up to a height of around 350 m (1,150 ft) before bearing north easterly to the highest point above the crags. An alternative is to climb from Greendale, via Greendale Gill and Tongues Gills. Buckbarrow can also be bagged almost as an afterthought as the walker descends from Seatallan. Buckbarrow's formidable crags are a popular rock climbing venue.
