= World's Biggest Liar =

Annual competition in Cumbria

World's Biggest Liar is an annual competition for telling lies, held in Cumbria, England. Competitors from around the world have five minutes to tell the biggest and most convincing lie they can. Competition rules bar the use of props or scripts. Politicians and lawyers are not allowed to enter the competition, because "they are judged to be too skilled at telling porkies".

== History ==
The World's Biggest Liar competition is held every November at the Bridge Inn, Santon Bridge, in memory of Will Ritson (1808–1890), a pub landlord from Wasdale, who was well known for his "tall tales". One of Ritson's most famous fibs was that turnips grew so large in the Lake District that people carved them out to make cow sheds.

== Recent competitions ==
In 2003, Abrie Krueger of South Africa was named the world's biggest liar after telling a story about how he was crowned King of the Wasdale Valley. This marked the first time that a foreigner had won the competition, which was marked with allegations of Krueger having cheated. A Bishop of Carlisle was supposed to have once won the competition with the shortest-ever speech; he simply said, "I have never told a lie in my life."

Comedian Sue Perkins won the competition in 2006, marking the first time in the event's history that a woman won the competition. Her winning tall tale was about how the ozone layer became damaged, ice caps melted and people had to be taken to work on camels.

In 2008, John "Johnny Liar" Graham won the competition for the seventh time after telling the judges a story of a magical ride to Scotland in a wheelie bin that went under the sea. The previous year Graham's winning lie was that a World War II German submarine had invaded Britain to capture digital television decoders.

Paul Burrows from Essex won the competition in 2010. He told a story of how the lakes and mountains of the Cumbrian countryside had been stolen from the county of Essex, leaving it as flat as it is today.

The 2011 winner was Glen Boylan. His story involved betting on a snail race with Prince Charles (who advised him to remove the shell to make it more aerodynamic) and losing because his opponents cheated with battery-operated snails.

2013 saw Mike Naylor win for the third time of his Lying career. Naylor, a 57-year-old man from Wasdale told a story about Wassie, the monster that lives in Wastwater, the local lake. He is the nephew of Joss Naylor, better known as a fell runner, but himself also a former winner of the competition.

In 2019, Phillip Gate from Workington won with a story about how Cumbria is rich not only in coal deposits but also sugar, which is the reason for the county's large jam production.
