= St Paul, Irton =

Coordinates: 54.391633°N 3.400511°W

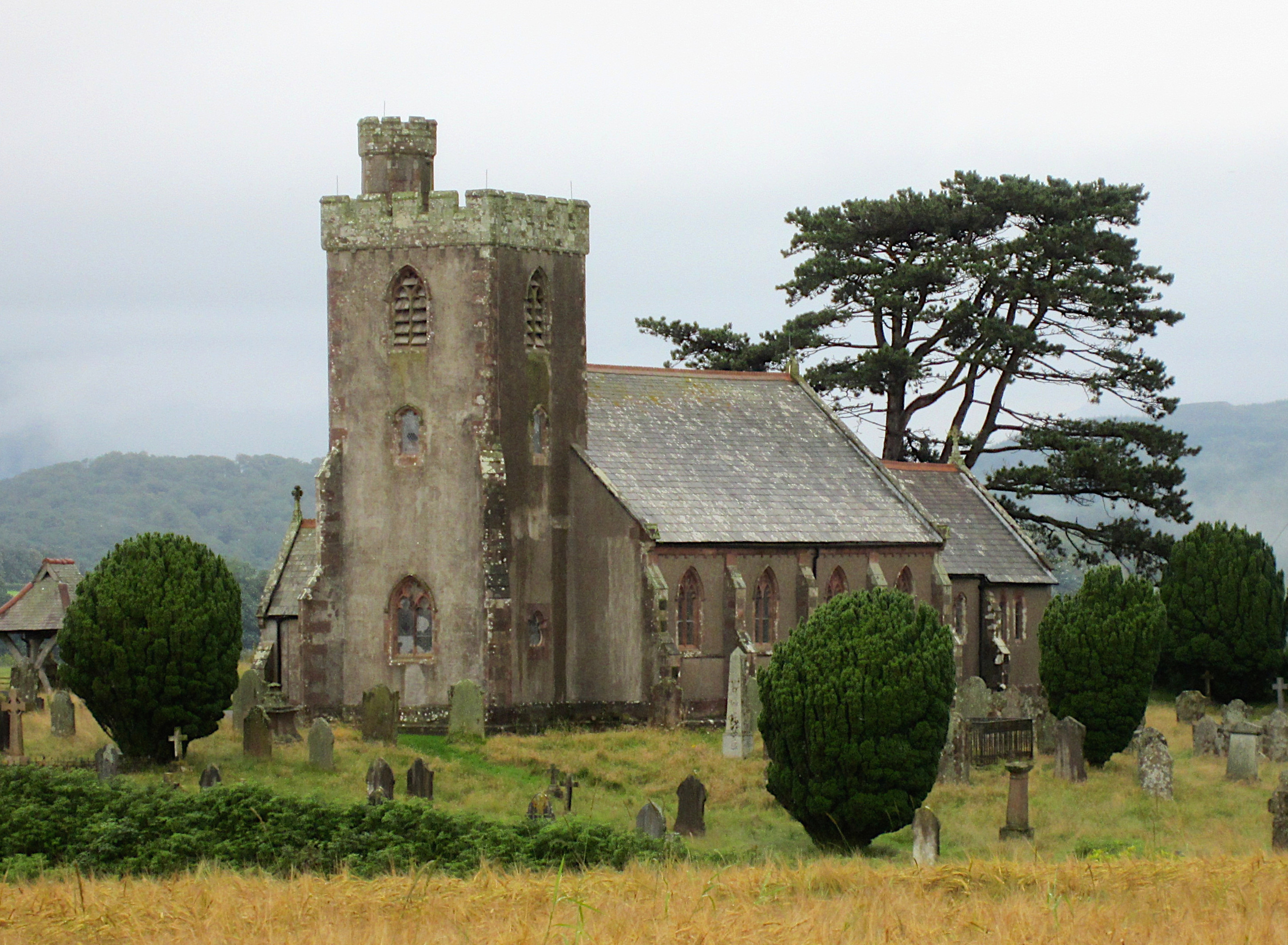
- St Paul, Irton

- Location in Cumbria
- OS grid reference: NY0915900477
- Location: St Paul, Irton, Cumbria
- Country: England
- Denomination: Anglican

History
- Status: Parish church
- Dedication: St Paul

Administration
- Province: York
- Diocese: Carlisle
- Archdeaconry: West Cumberland
- Deanery: Calder
- Parish: Irton with Santon

Clergy
- Vicar: Revd Gill Hart

St Paul, Irton is an active parish church in the civil parish of Irton with Santon, Cumbria, England. It is in the Calder Deanery of the Anglican diocese of Carlisle and is part of the benefice of Black Combe, Drigg, Eskdale, Irton, Muncaster and Waberthwaite. It stands in a commanding position on the low ridge between Wasdale and Eskdale, and the noted 9th century Anglo-Saxon cross testifies to a long history of it being a Christian site. The church is a Grade II* Listed Building.

== History ==
St Paul's church was founded by Augustinian monks in the 13th century. It was rebuilt and consecrated in 1865, designed by Miles Thompson of Kendal using the old church's original stone and wood. The chancel was extended in 1872 to designs by William White. Further extensions and renovations were carried out in 1887 to commemorate the Golden Jubilee of Queen Victoria, including the building of the present double-hammer-beam roof.

== Architecture ==
It is roughcast with sandstone dressings, with a slate roof and terra-cotta ridge tiles. The interior space comprises a 4-bay nave with a castellated west tower and turret. There is a 3-bay chancel with adjoining vestry. The church floor is tiled with Minton Encaustic tiles. The stone font has 4 marble shafts supporting circular bowl with evangelist symbols carved on panels at cardinal points. The octagonal wooden pulpit has arcaded, openwork sides. The pipe organ is decorated with Fleur-de-lis. The pews are fixed and have quatrefoils carved into the ends.

== Stained glass ==
There are two notable Pre-Raphaelite stained glass windows, each of two lights, made by Morris & Co, and installed at the time of church improvements for the Golden Jubilee of Queen Victoria in 1887. Sir Edward Burne-Jones designed St Paul, the Tiburtine Sibyl, and St Agnes with a lamb, and William Morris himself designed St Catherine of Alexandria. They were the gift of Major Lutwidge and Sir Thomas Brocklebank.

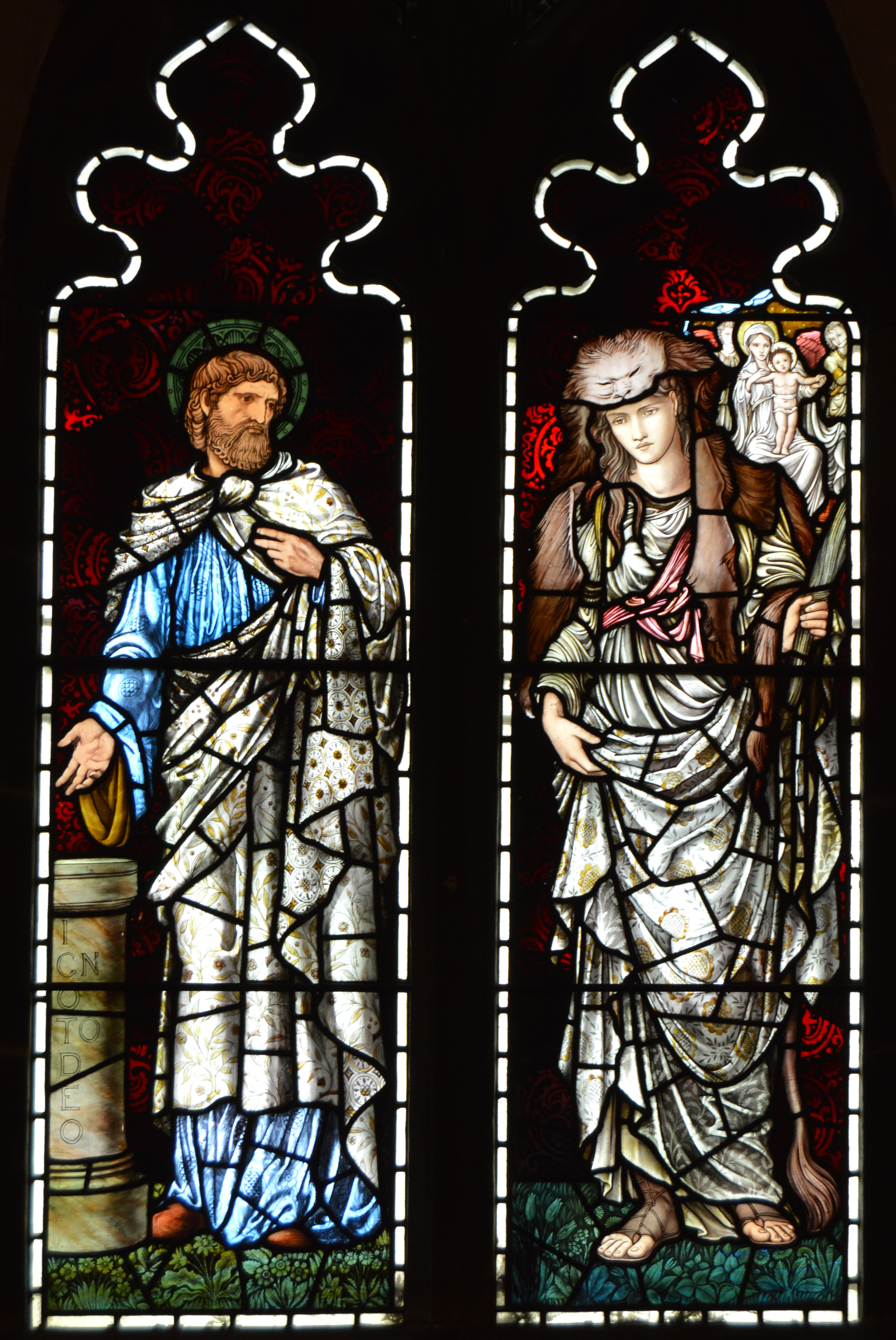
Left - St Paul, right - the Tiburtine Sybil. 1887.

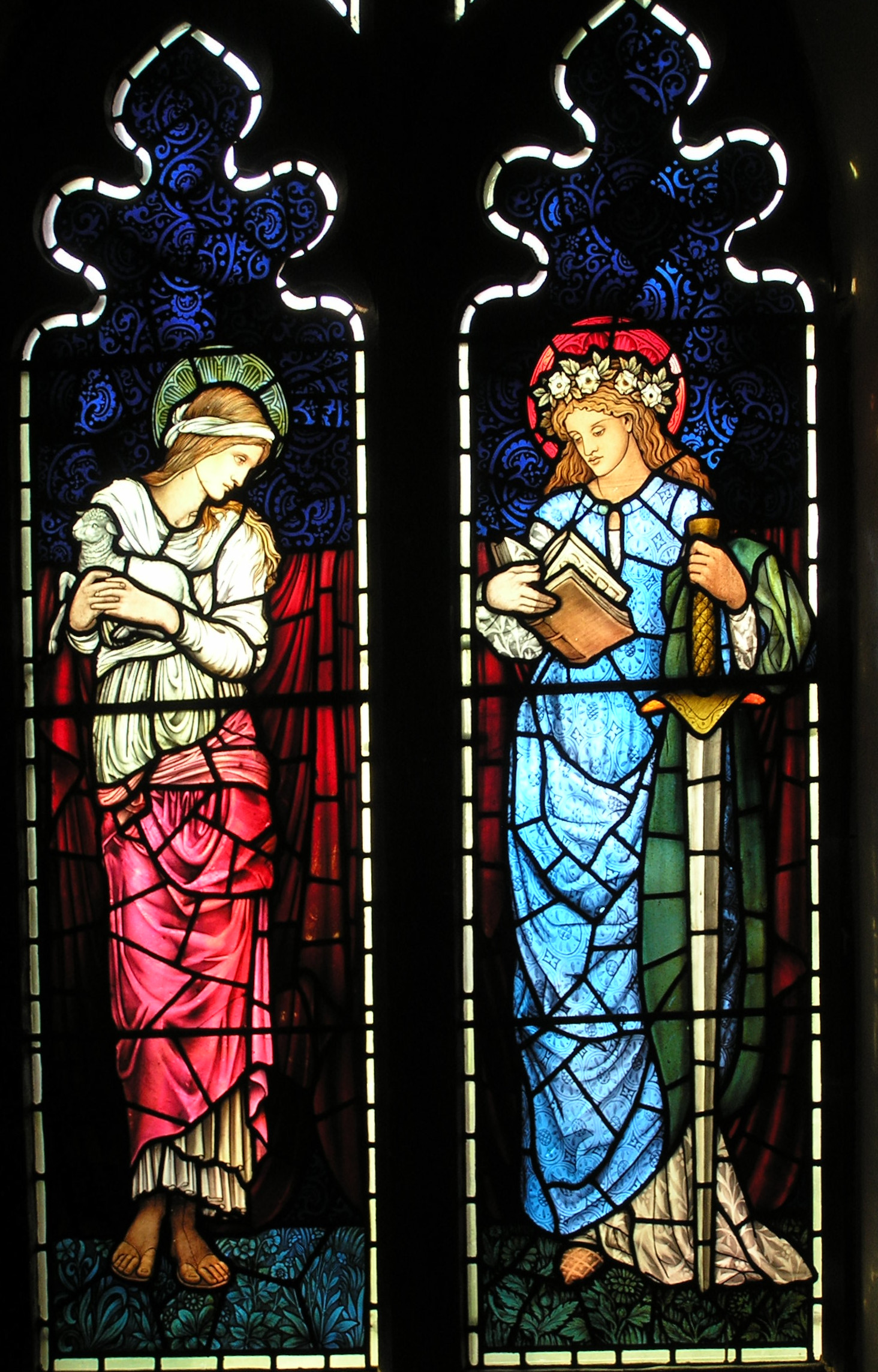
Left -St Agnes of Rome and right - Catherine of Alexandria. 1887.

== Memorials ==
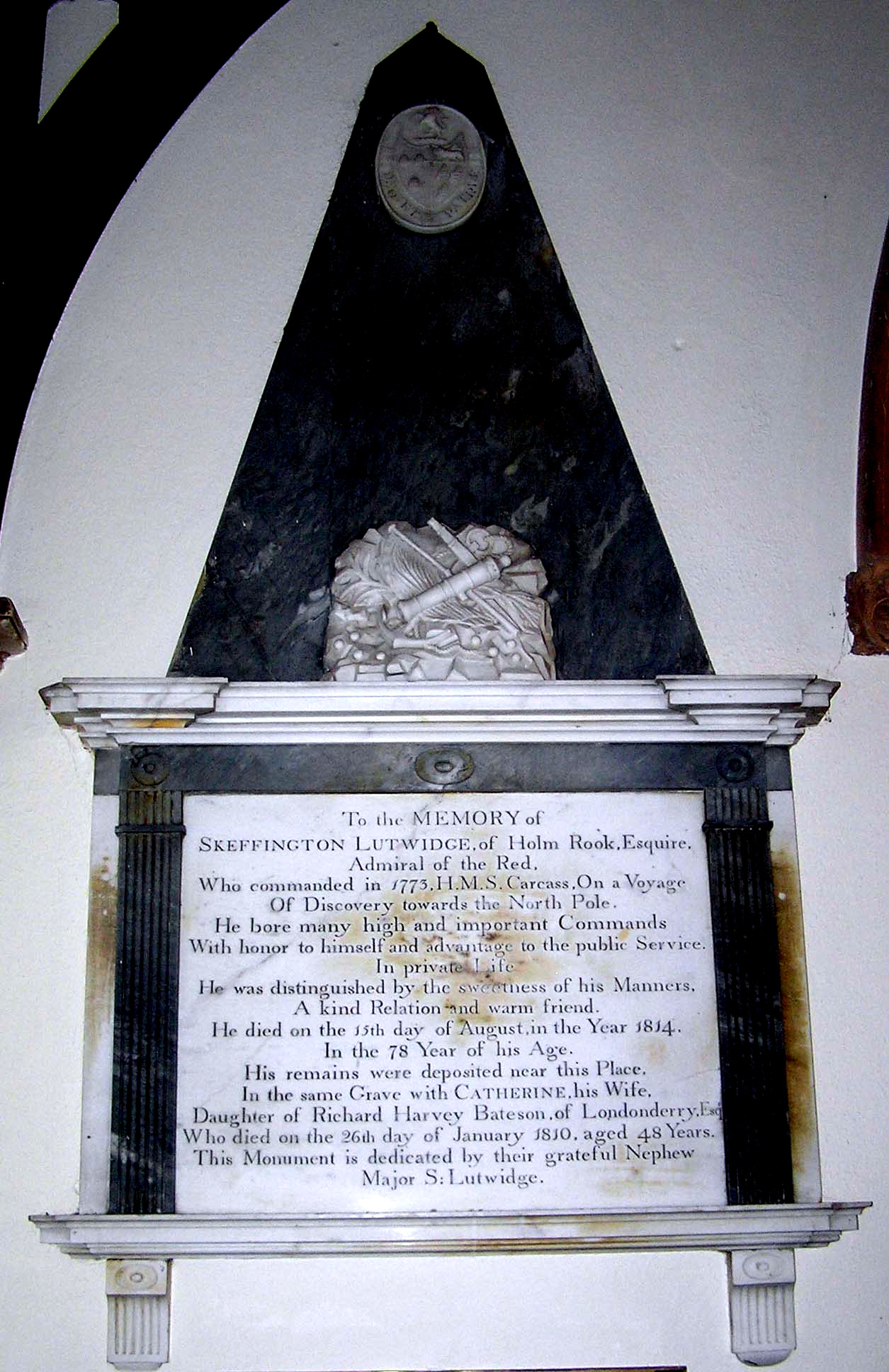
Memorial to Skeffington Lutwidge, Admiral of the Red.

There are memorials to various members of the Brocklebank family, and the Lutwidge family. The memorial to Admiral Skeffington Lutwidge is particularly interesting. He commanded HMS Carcass on the 1773 Phipps expedition towards the North Pole, with a young Horatio Nelson on board. During the expedition Nelson had seen and given chase to a polar bear on the ice, but was ordered back from this dangerous pursuit by Lutwidge. A plaque by the font is in memory of another Lutwidge: Robert Wilfred Skeffington-Lutwidge, who was a commissioner in lunacy. The plaque tells the tragic tale of how he died after being hit on the head by a lunatic. There are several decorative wall plates dating up to the 20th century executed by Morris & Co.

== Bells ==
The tower contains a ring of eight bells, hung for ringing in the English full-circle style and given by Sir Thomas Brocklebank, a local shipping magnate. They were cast in 1887 by John Warner and Sons of Cripplegate, London. The bells are rung from the ground floor, and there is a fine wrought iron scroll work screen separating the ringing chamber from the nave. The tenor weighs 16–1–25 (837 kg) and is tuned to E natural.

== Irton Cross ==
In the churchyard is Irton Cross, an important Anglo-Saxon cross dating from the early 9th century. It lies chronologically between the Bewcastle Cross and the Gosforth cross but has greater affinity with the earlier Anglo-Roman style of Bewcastle. Pevsner describes this as one of the most important crosses in Cumberland.

A cast replica of the cross can be seen at the Victoria and Albert Museum in London.

== Churchyard ==
The churchyard has approximately 100 grave memorials and a further 100 in an adjacent cemetery, including one Commonwealth War Grave

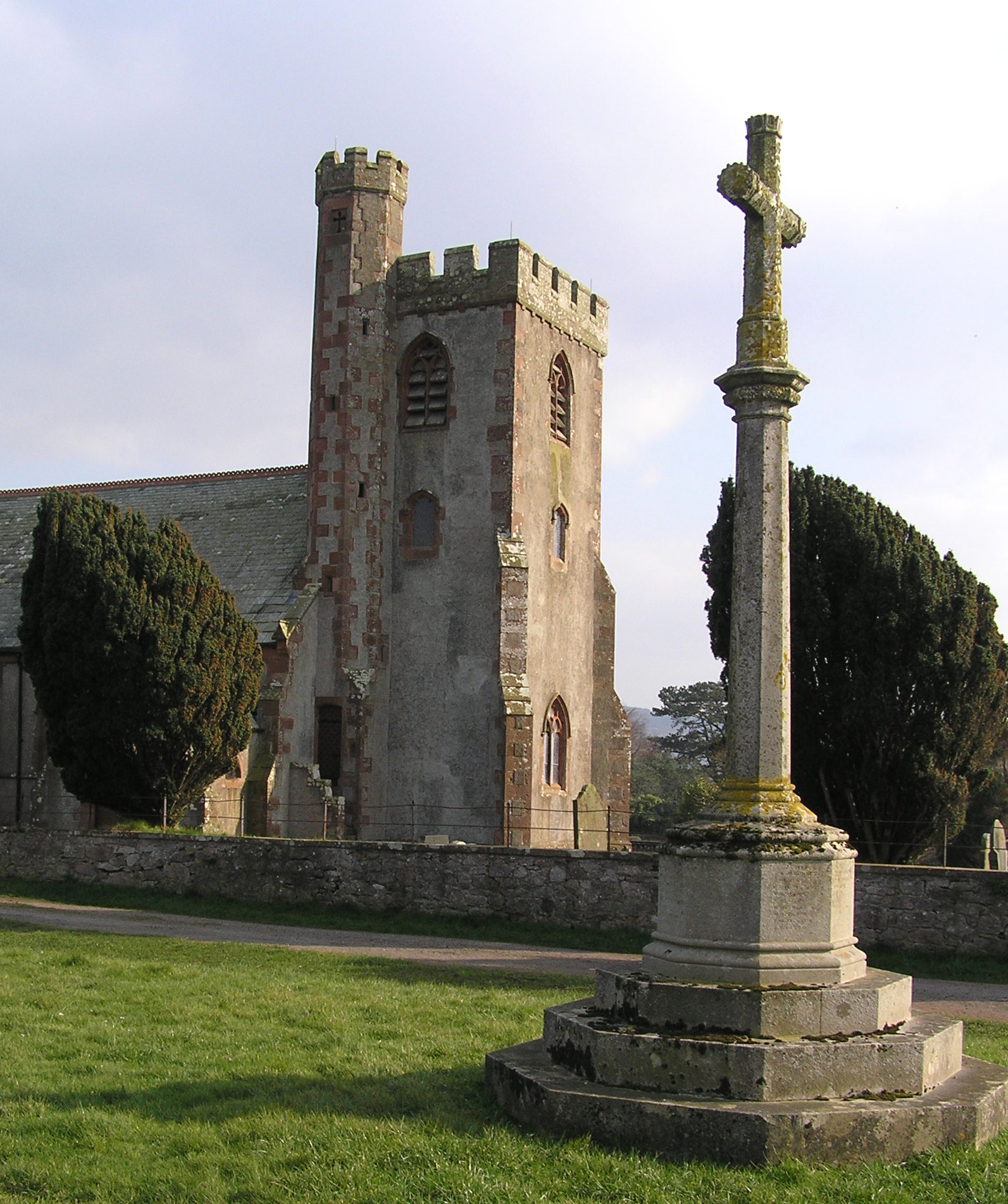
Irton church Cumbria.

== Media ==
Video of the bells being rung
