= Miles Thompson (architect) =

English architect (1808-1868)

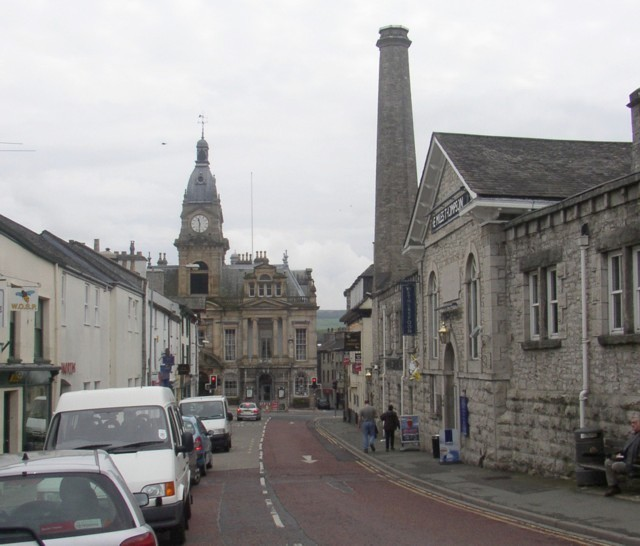
The Miles Thompson pub, formerly Kendal Public Wash-house, designed by Thompson

Miles Thompson (1808-1868) was an English architect from Kendal, then in Westmorland.

He was employed by Francis and George Webster as a draughtsman from about 1825, was taken into partnership in 1845, and took over the business when George retired in 1846.

== Selected works ==
Image	Date	Location	Building	Comments
	1864-1866	Arnside	St James' Church	
	1857	Irton with Santon	Church of St Paul	Grade II* listed
	1864	Kendal, All Hallows Lane	Public wash-house and baths	Grade II listed. Now "The Miles Thompson" pub.
	1844	Kendal, Bankside Road	Inghamite chapel	Converted into apartments in 1985
	1852	Kendal, Highgate	Sandes Hospital almshouses, rebuilding	
	1855	Kirkby Lonsdale	Market House	Grade II listed.

== Life and legacy ==
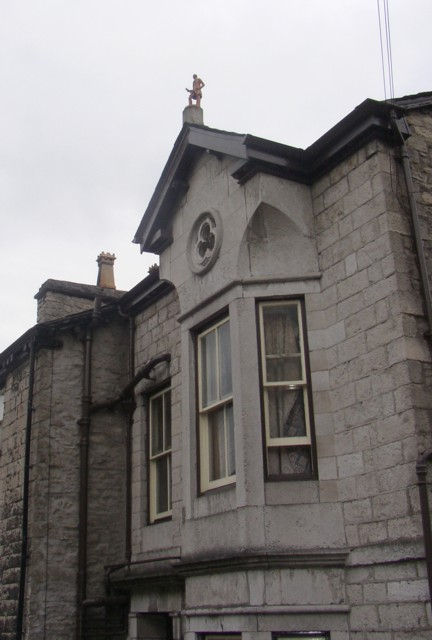
Thompson's statuette on 21 Beast Banks, Kendal

He did not marry, and died in Kendal on 26 August 1868. In his will he left several properties in and around Kendal to his three brothers Robert, Marcellus and John and various nieces and nephews.

A statuette of Thompson was placed by his brother Robert on top of the gable of number 21 Beast Banks in Kendal. After it deteriorated, a replacement was erected by the Kendal Civic Society.

John Close, writing in 1862, celebrates Thompson in one of a group of biographical poems entitled "Nature's Nobility". The first verse, of seven, is:

Nature, when in a genial mood
Created Miles so clever;
And fortune smiles upon him too, -
Success attends him ever.

— J. Close, Once a year, tales and legends of Westmorland, Issue 1

The Kendal public wash-house building in Allhallows Lane which he designed is now a Wetherspoons pub named "The Miles Thompson" in his memory, having served as offices for South Lakeland District Council in between.
