= Irton Cross =

Coordinates: 54.39144°N 3.40052°W

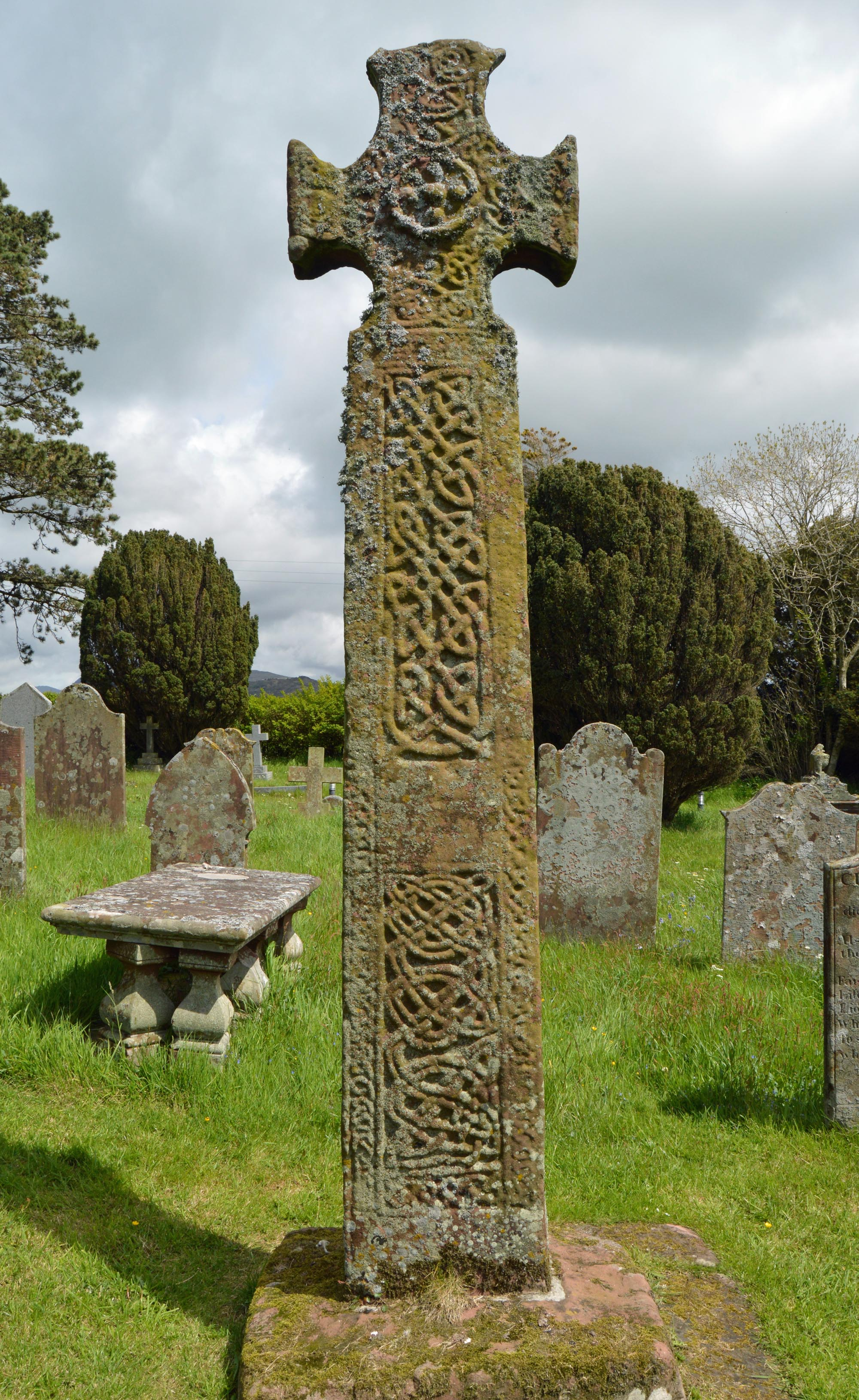
Irton Cross - west face

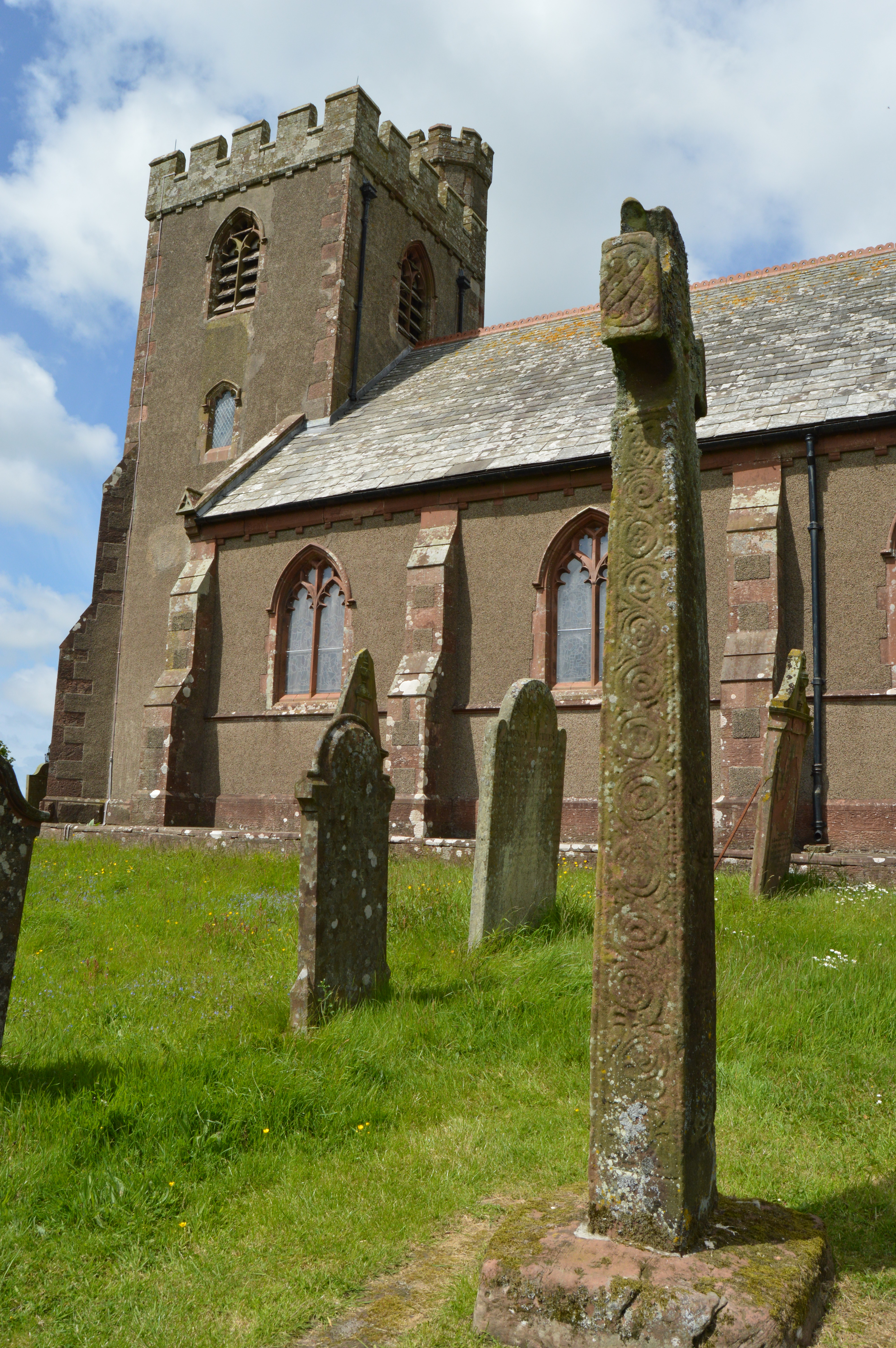
Irton cross - seen in the context of St Paul's Church. The scrolls on the south face are visible.

Irton Cross is an Anglo-Saxon cross in the graveyard of St Paul's Church, in the parish of Irton with Santon, Cumbria, England. Dating from the early 9th century, it lies chronologically between the Bewcastle Cross and the Gosforth cross and has greater affinity with the earlier Anglo-Roman style of Bewcastle.

== Description ==
The west face has two panels of interlace, between which is a panel which once contained three lines of runes, all of which is surrounded by a border of knotwork. The east face also has two panels with a diagonal key pattern, and two with chequers, which are in fact small sunken crosses. There is fine scroll work on the narrow north and south sides, with leaves stem and fruit, possibly indicating a vine.

== Access ==
The graveyard is open to the public and the cross can be examined at any time. It is to the south of St Paul's Church.

A replica of the cross can also be seen at the Victoria and Albert Museum in London. The cast was made in 1882, and along with one of the Gosforth cross, it can be seen in the cast hall of the museum.

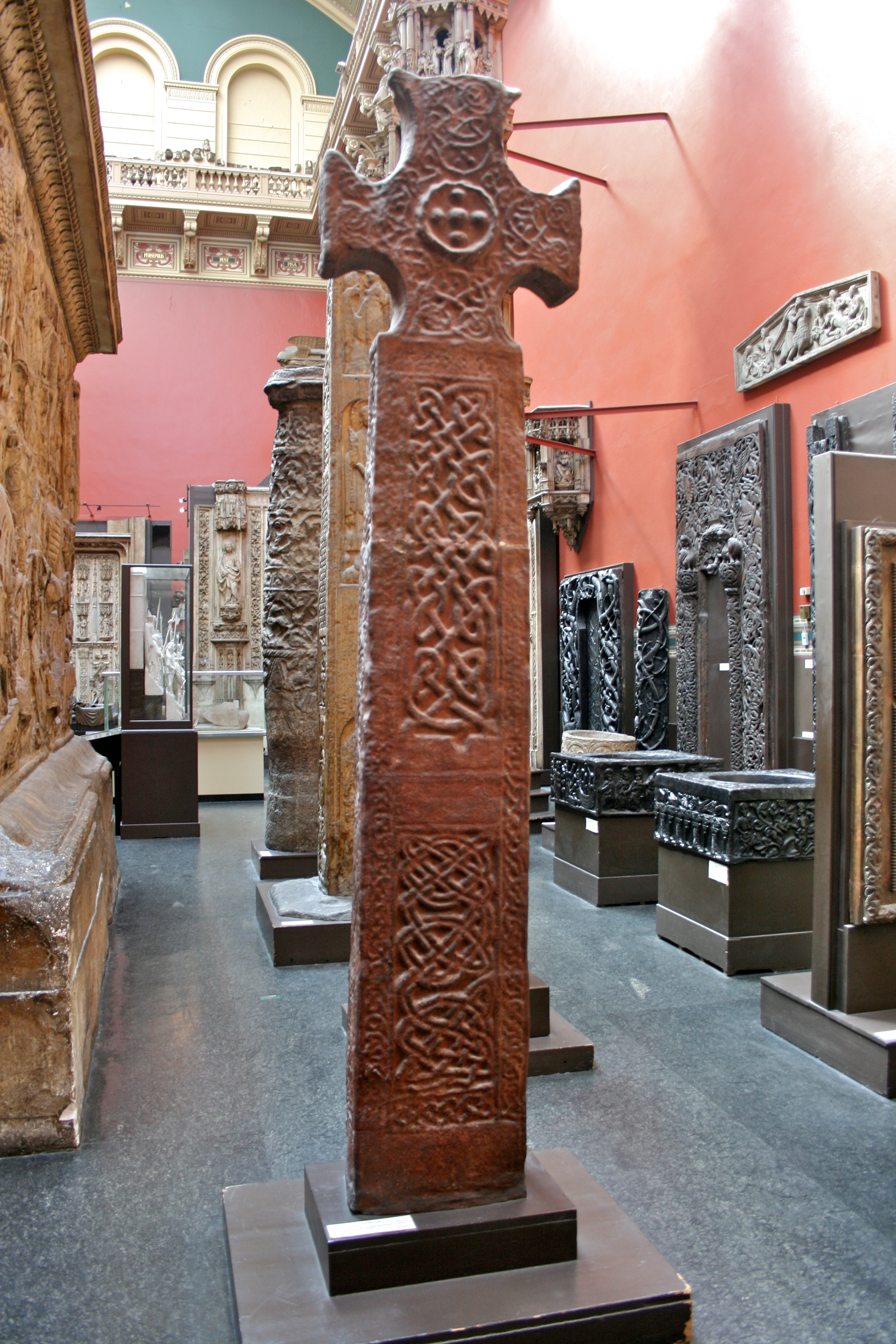
Replica of the Irton Cross in the Victoria and Albert museum

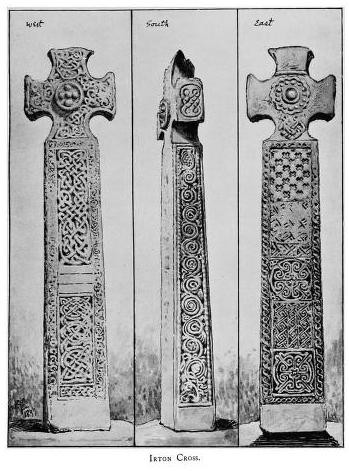
Sketch from Victoria History of England
