= Seatallan =

Mountain in Cumbria, England

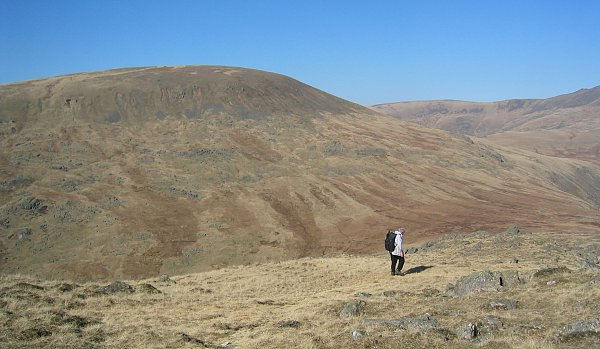
- Seatallan seen from the neighbouring Middle Fell

Highest point
- Elevation: 692 m (2,270 ft)
- Prominence: 193 m (633 ft)
- Parent peak: Pillar
- Listing: Marilyn, Hewitt, Wainwright, Nuttall
- Coordinates: 54°27′49″N 3°19′47″W

Geography
- Location within the Lake District Location within the former Borough of Copeland
- Location: Cumbria, England
- Parent range: Lake District, Western Fells
- OS grid: NY139084
- Topo map: OS Landranger 89, Explorer OL6

Seatallan is a mountain in the western part of the English Lake District. It is rounded, grassy and fairly unassuming, occupying a large amount of land. However, it is classed as a Marilyn because of the low elevation of the col connecting it to Haycock, its nearest higher neighbour to the north. The name Seatallan is believed to have a Cumbric origin, meaning "Aleyn's high pasture".

== Topography ==
The Western Fells occupy a triangular sector of the Lake District, bordered by the River Cocker to the north east and Wasdale to the south east. Westwards the hills diminish toward the coastal plain of Cumberland. At the central hub of the high country are Great Gable and its satellites, while two principal ridges fan out on either flank of Ennerdale, the western fells in effect being a great horseshoe around this long wild valley. Seatallan is an outlier of the southern arm.

The main watershed runs broadly westwards from Great Gable, dividing the headwaters of Ennerdale and Wasdale. Travelling in this direction the principal hills are Kirk Fell, Pillar, Scoat Fell, Haycock and Caw Fell. Haycock sends out a long southern ridge terminating in Seatallan.

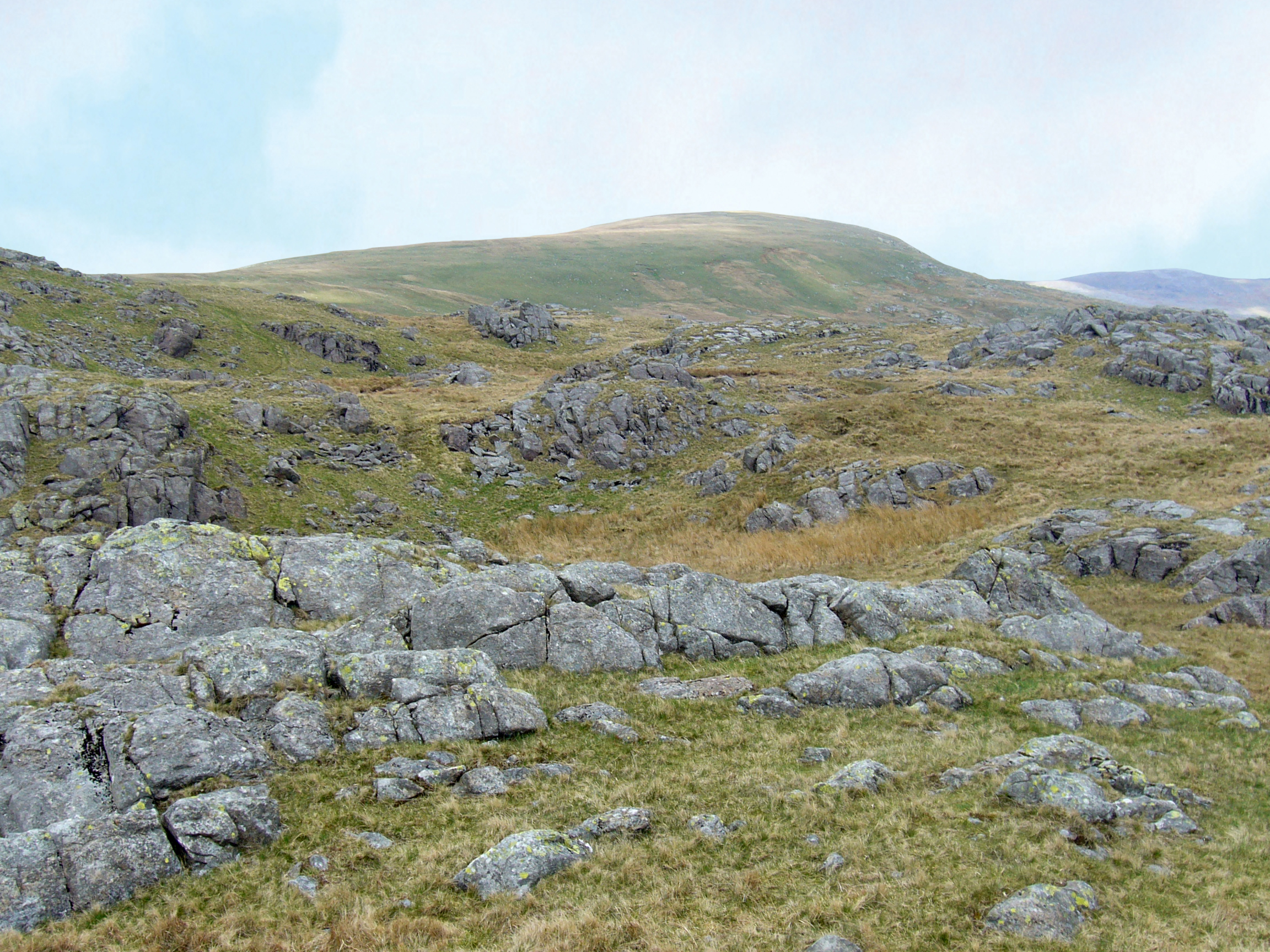
Seatallan seen from an ascent on its southern slopes from Nether Wasdale.

Seatallan begins at the Pots of Ashness, a broad grassy depression to the south of Haycock. From here a stiff ascent up what may have been a landslip leads directly to the summit. The top of the fell resembles a truncated cone, cut off at an angle and sloping away to the south. This cone in turn stands upon a much broader upland plateau which stretches away five miles (8 km) to the south west. The River Bleng forms the entire western boundary, beginning on the slopes of Haycock and then flowing out in a huge loop to the south west. It finally joins the Irt and continues on to the sea at Ravenglass. The extremity of the Bleng's circuit, near to Gosforth, is given over to lowland cultivation and although belonging topographically to Seatallan could hardly be termed fellside. Higher up the south western shoulder are conifer plantations, both along the Bleng and above the Irt. Open fellside begins two miles south west of the summit.

To the east of Pots of Ashness is the valley of Nether Beck, flowing to Wastwater, with Red Pike beyond. Nether Beck swings away from Seatallan on its southward journey, diverted by the rocky height of Middle Fell. This is Seatallan's principal satellite, a broad ridge falling from the east of the summit cone. Middle Fell curves around to run parallel to Seatallan with the valley of Greendale Gill dividing the two. The stream begins at Greendale Tarn, nestled into the steep face of Middle Fell. The tarn, around 30 feet (10 metres) deep, sits in a long narrow bowl, looked down on by a collection of huge boulders.

Seatallan's most prominent feature is Buckbarrow, the 400-foot (120-metre) rampart of crags on the southern edge overlooking lower Greendale and Wast Water. Buckbarrow is given a separate chapter in Alfred Wainwright's The Western Fells, and is thus classed as a Wainwright, despite having virtually no topographic prominence of its own. That convention is followed here. Above Buckbarrow are the minor tops of Glade How and Cat Bield, leading onto the great south west shoulder. Seatallan has other areas of much less impressive crag above the upper Bleng (Raven Crag) and Nether Beck (Winscale How).

== Geology ==
Much of the fell is covered in deep drift deposits, but the underlying rock is generally the plagioclase-phyric dacite lava referred to as Seatallan Dacite. Above the Bleng are large areas of diorite, while around Buckbarrow there are outcrops of the andesite Birker Fell Formation. Minor intrusions of rhyolite and basalt have been located to the north.

== Summit ==
A large tumulus marks the summit, alongside an Ordnance Survey triangulation column. The top is grassed and it is assumed that the tumulus was built from stones on the north slope. The view is heavily obstructed by the main range of the western fells, the highpoints being the Scafells and Coniston Fells. Wastwater can be brought into view by walking north east.

== Ascents ==
Indirect ascents via Buckbarrow begin from Harrow Head. An alternative bypasses the subsidiary summit to gain Cat Bields from the south west. From Greendale the gill can be followed almost to the tarn, before branching off up the grassy slopes of Seatallan. If preferred Middle Fell can be used as a stepping stone onto Seatallan from the same point. Finally from Nether Beck Bridge the route to Haycock can be used, turning west via Lad Crag Beck to the summit.
