= Whin Rigg =

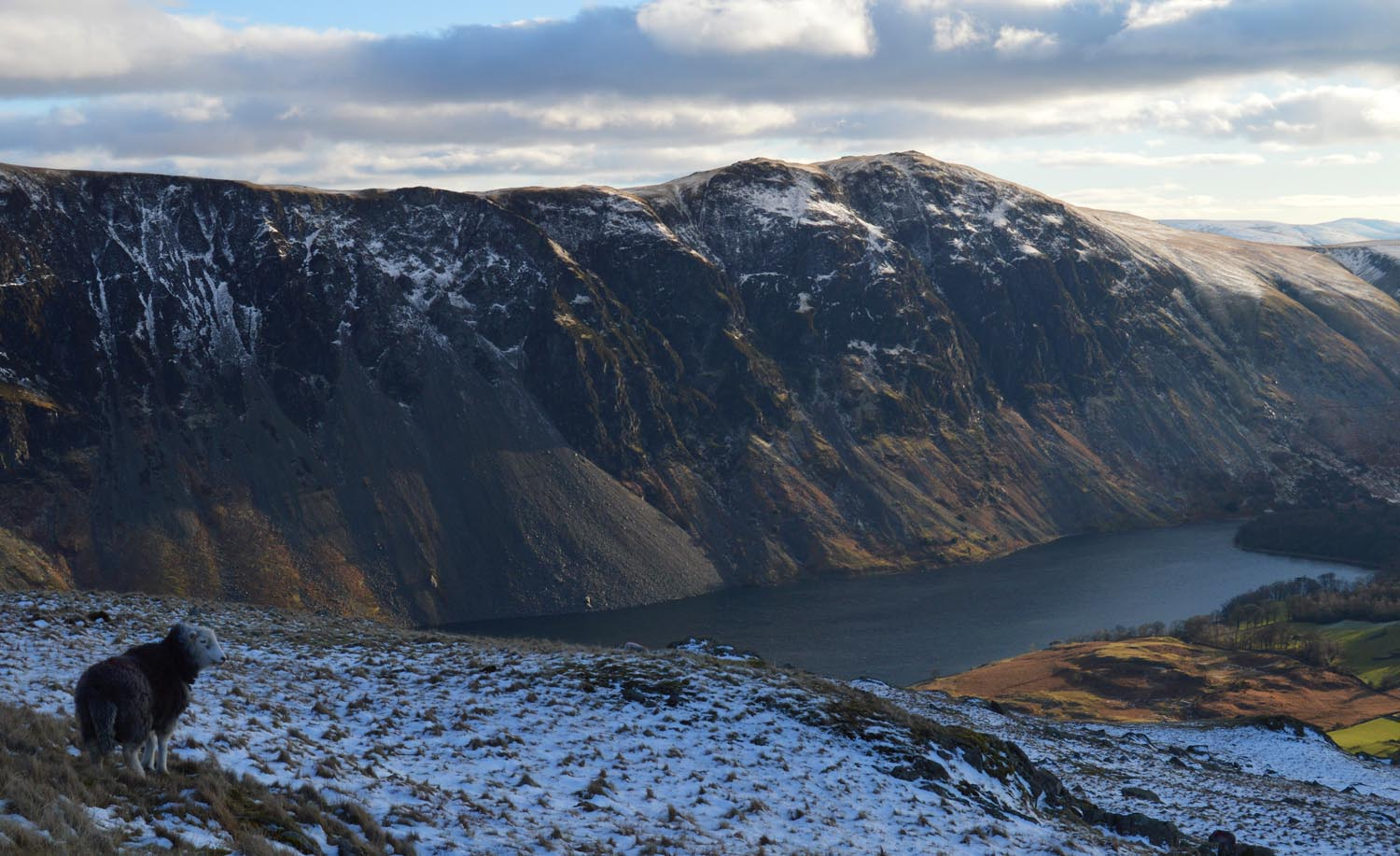
- Whin Rigg and The Screes seen across Wast Water from Middle Fell.

Highest point
- Elevation: 535 m (1,755 ft)
- Prominence: 58 m (190 ft)
- Parent peak: Illgill Head
- Listing: Wainwright
- Coordinates: 54°25′08″N 3°18′36″W

Geography
- Location within the Lake District Location within the former Borough of Copeland
- Location: Cumbria, England
- Parent range: Lake District, Southern Fells
- OS grid: NY151034
- Topo map: OS Landranger 89 OS Explorer OL6

Whin Rigg is a fell in the English Lake District, situated in the western segment of the national park, 22 kilometres (14 miles) south east of the town of Whitehaven. It reaches only a modest altitude of 535 m (1,755 ft) but is part of one of the Lake District’s most dramatic landscapes in that the rugged and impressive Wastwater Screes (also known as "The Screes") fall from the fells summit to Wast Water over 450 m (1,500 ft) below. The fell's name means “gorse covered ridge” and originates from the Old Norse words “Hvin” meaning gorse and “Hryggr” meaning Ridge.

== Topography and Geology ==
Whin Rigg is linked to the adjoining fell of Illgill Head, just 1.5 kilometres (1 mile) away at the northern end of The Screes by a path that gives precipitous views down to Wast Water.

The Screes are a Site of Special Scientific Interest and are regarded as a classic geological locality and one of the best and most famous examples of screes in Britain. The escarpment and screes are made up of hard wearing Borrowdale Volcanics rock, however there are areas of less resistant rock which have been eroded and this has led to deep gullies in the cliff face. The cliffs around the summit of Whin Rigg take the form of vertical rock buttresses which are split by the huge Great Gully and C Gully which give precipitous views of Wast Water. The gullies are spectacular but are a no go area for walkers, Great Gully has seventeen near vertical pitches and the remains of an aeroplane within it.

Apart from The Screes, Whin Rigg has another fine geological feature in Greathall Gill. This is a granite ravine which rises up the fell from where the River Irt flows out of Wast Water to the 400 metres (1,300 ft) mark on the fell to the south west of the summit. The lower section of the ravine in steep sided and wooded and support a range of mosses, ferns and herbs including Common wood sorrel, Chrysosplenium oppositifolium (opposite leaved golden saxifrage) and great wood rush.

== Ascents ==
The path on the eastern side of Greathall Gill has developed into a popular way up the fell from Nether Wasdale and has become eroded in recent years, it is being monitored so any worsening of the situation can be reversed.

Whin Rigg can be climbed either from Nether Wasdale in Wasdale or Eskdale Green in Eskdale using the bridleway which links the two places to attain the western ridge of the fell, there are then 230 metres (750 ft) of ascent up the ridge to reach the summit. Walkers starting from the Wasdale side can also use the footpath by Greathall Gill as already mentioned.

== Summit ==
The highlight of the summit panorama is the view down to Wast Water, and there are good views of the coastal plain and the Isle of Man.

- Panorama
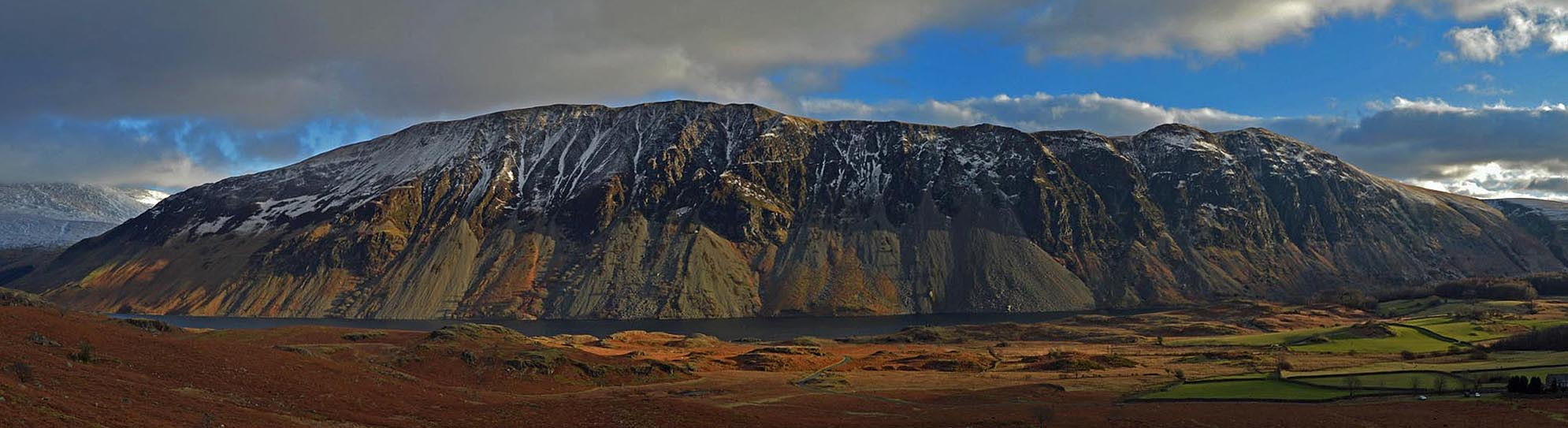
Panorama of the Wasdale screes, Illgill Head in the centre, Whin Rigg on the right.
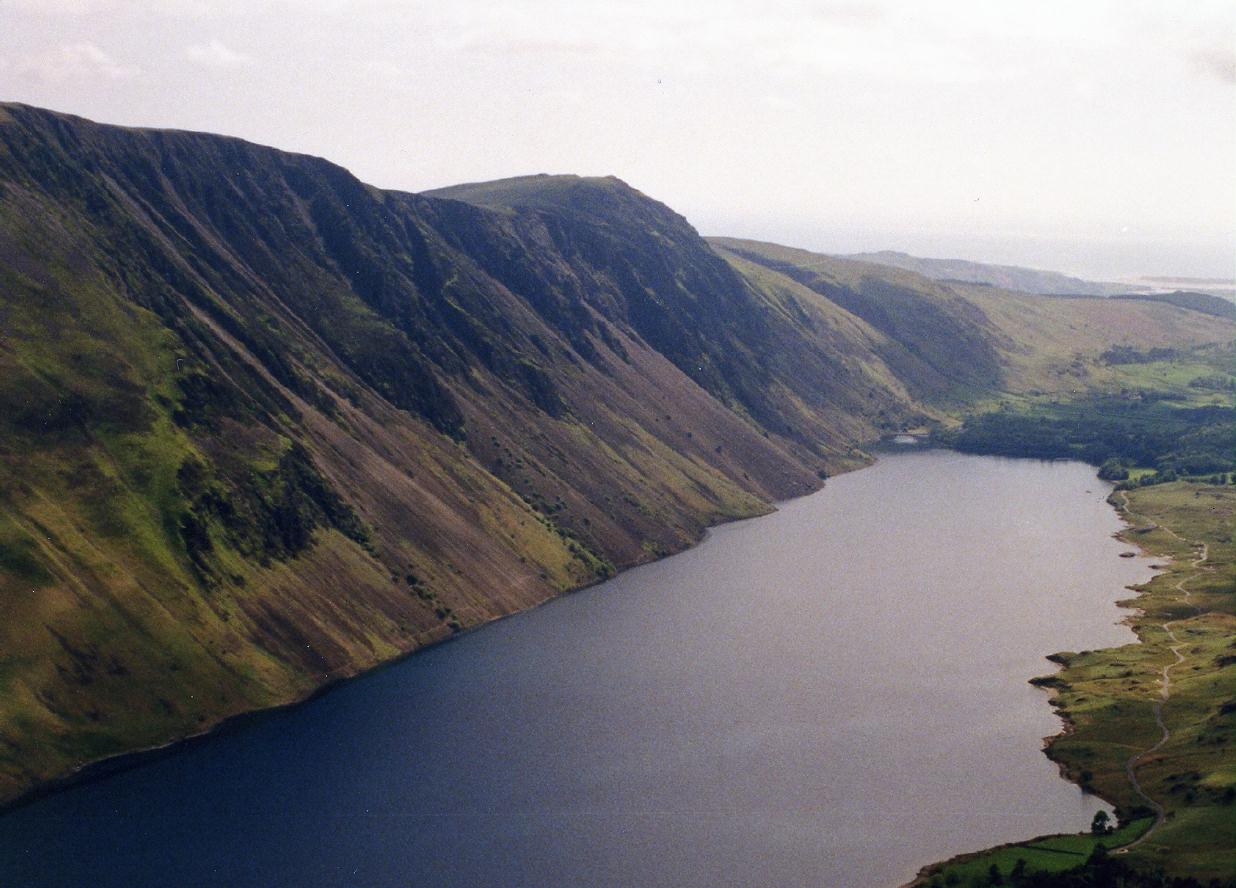
View from Yewbarrow

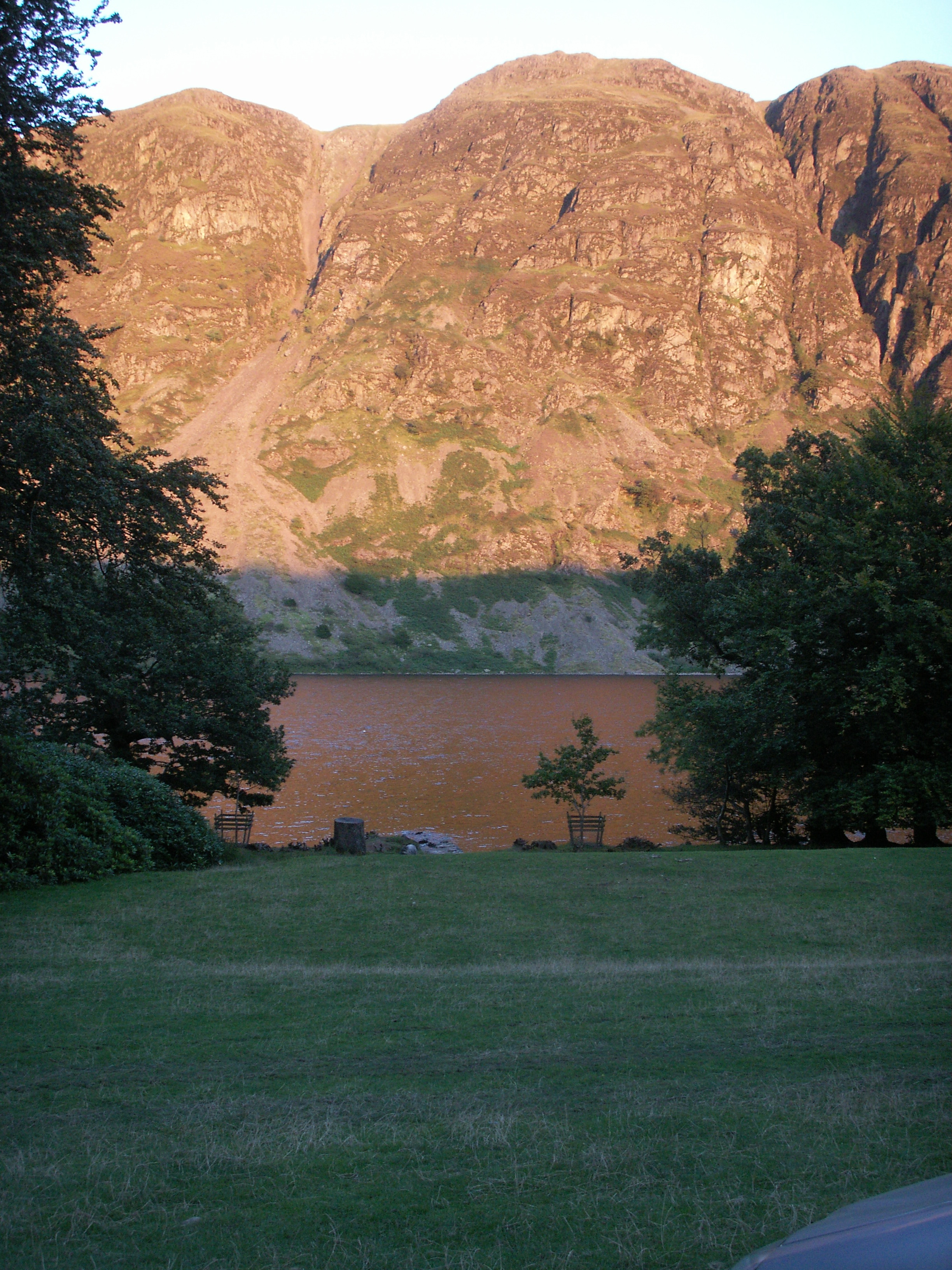
Wastwater and Whin Rigg illuminated by the setting sun

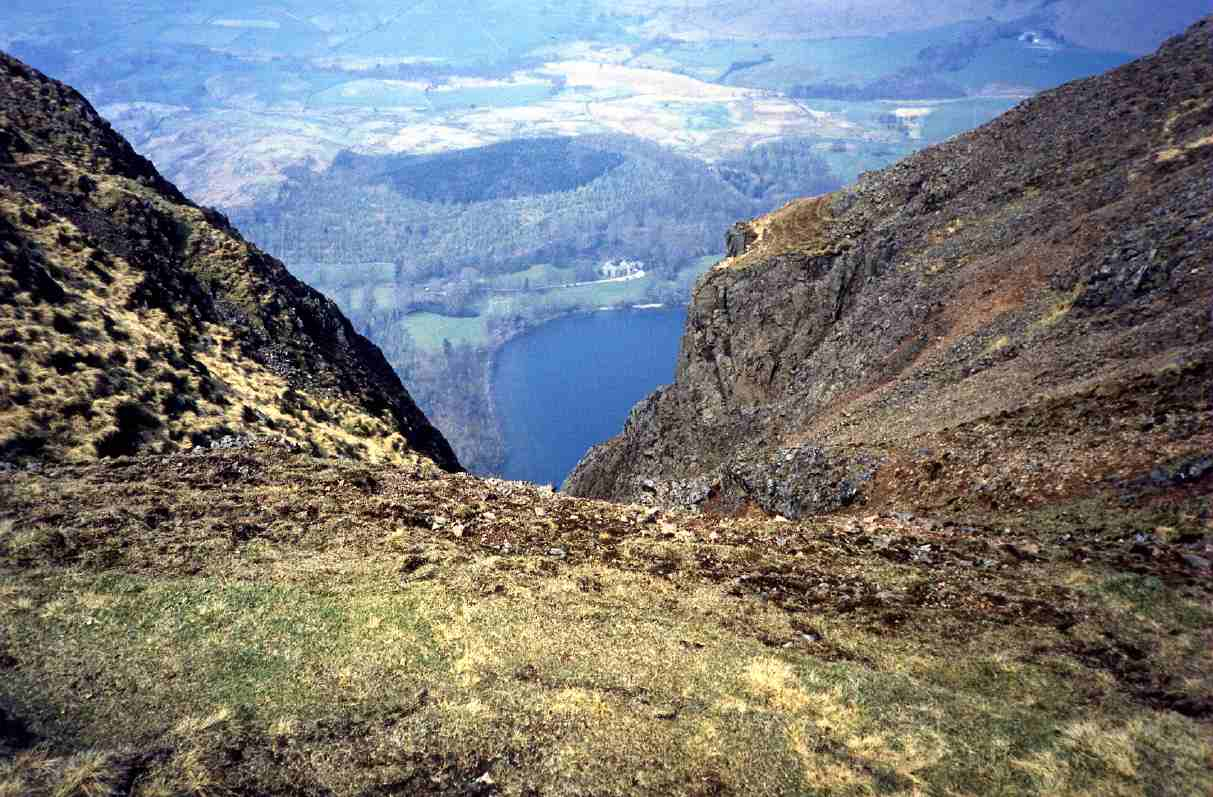
A vertigo-inducing view of Wastwater down Great Gully from the summit of Whin Rigg.
