= River Bleng =

River in Cumbria, England

Coordinates: 54°24′58″N 3°23′10″W

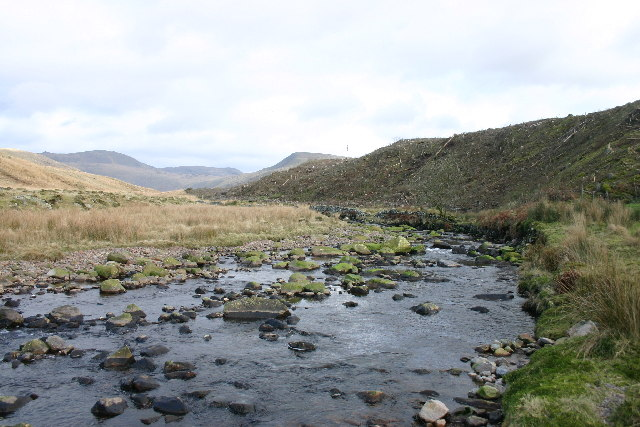
River Bleng upstream of Blengdale Forest

The River Bleng is a tributary of the River Irt in the county of Cumbria in northern England.

The river gives its name to the valley that it flows through which is called Blengdale. It is thought that the name Bleng is derived from the Old Norse word blaeingr, which translates as dark water, so Blengdale would mean the valley of the dark river.

The river rises at Stockdale Head in the Lake District, it then flows south and then east towards for 10 miles (16 km) its confluence with the River Irt. The Bleng only passes through one village - Wellington, near Gosforth, Cumbria.

== Tributaries ==
- Ongue Gill
- Ill Gill
- Swinsty Beck
- Star Beck
- Skalderskew Beck
- Scale Beck
- Hale Beck
