= Wast Water =

Body of water in Cumbria, England

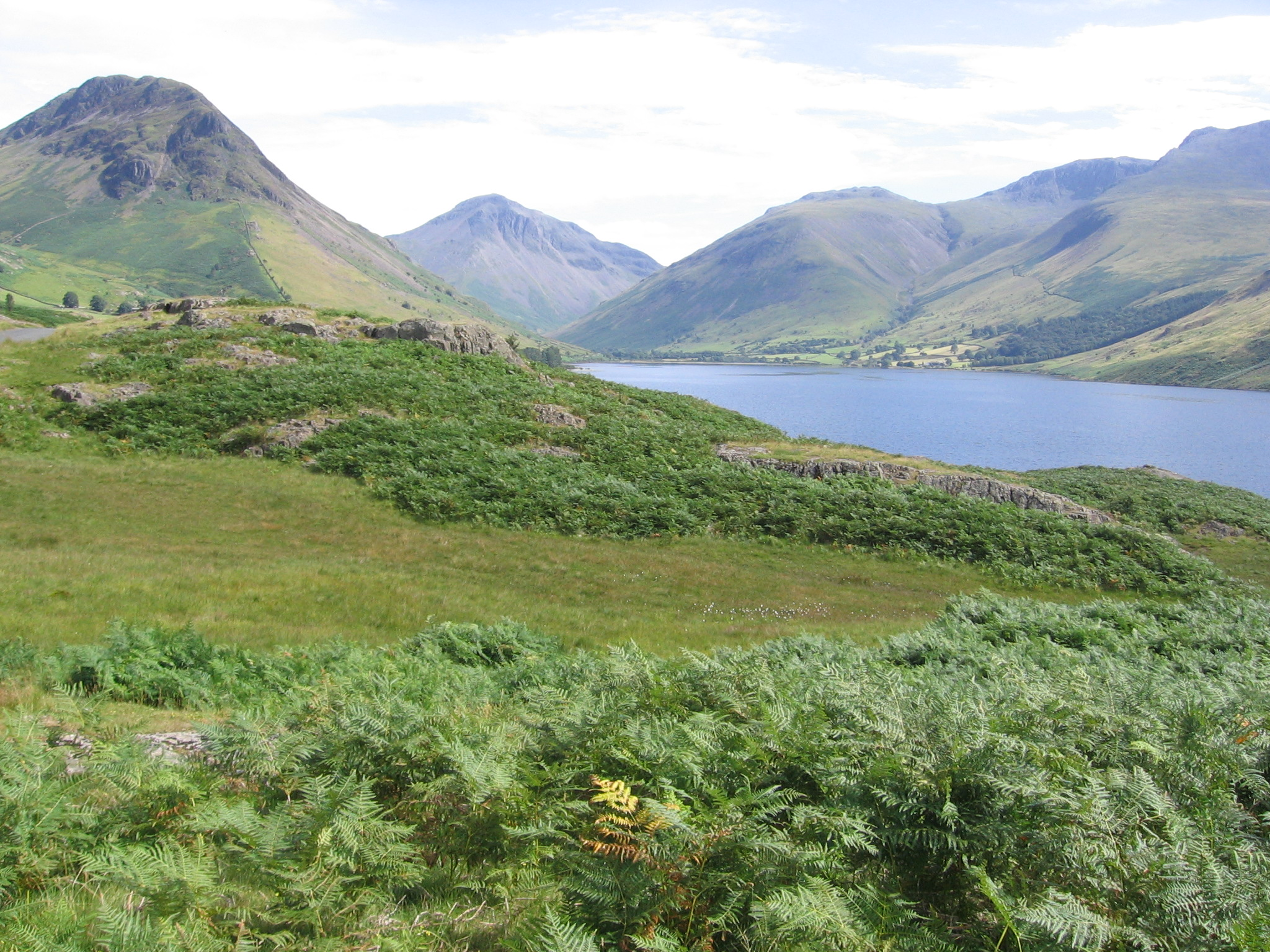
- Looking towards Wasdale Head

- Location in the Lake District Location in the former Copeland Borough

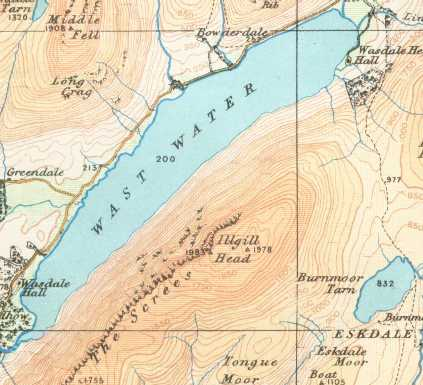
- Map of 1925
- Location: England
- Coordinates: 54°26′30″N 3°17′30″W
- Type: Ribbon Lake
- Primary inflows: see list
- Primary outflows: River Irt
- Basin countries: United Kingdom
- Max. length: 3.03 miles (4.88 km)
- Max. width: 0.49 miles (788.58 m)
- Surface area: 1.08 sq mi (2.8 km^{2})
- Max. depth: 258 feet (79 m)
- Water volume: 0.110 cubic kilometres (0.026 cu mi)
- Shore length^{1}: 6.84 mi (11.01 km)
- Surface elevation: 200 feet (61 m)
- ^{1} Shore length is not a well-defined measure.

Wast Water or Wastwater (/ˈwɒst wɔːtər/) is a lake located in Wasdale, a valley in the western part of the Lake District National Park, England. The lake is almost three miles (five kilometres) long and more than one-third mile (500 m) wide. It is a glacial lake, formed in a glacially "over-deepened" valley. It is the deepest lake in England at 258 feet (79 m). The surface of the lake is about 200 feet (60 m) above sea level, while its bottom is over 50 feet (15 m) below sea level. It is considered relatively clear (oligotrophic). It is owned by the National Trust.

== Toponymy ==
The name Wast Water is a reduced form of Was(t)dale Water, referring to the valley in which the lake lies. The name Wasdale itself comes from the Old Norse Vatnsdalr, meaning "valley of the lake".

== Surroundings ==
The head of the Wasdale Valley is surrounded by some of the highest mountains in England, including Scafell Pike, Great Gable and Lingmell. The steep slopes on the southeastern side of the lake, leading up to the summits of Whin Rigg and Illgill Head, are known as the "Wastwater Screes", Wasdale Screes or on some maps "The Screes". These screes formed as a result of ice and weathering erosion on the rocks of the Borrowdale Volcanic Group, that form the fells to the east of the lake, towards Eskdale. They are approximately 2,000 feet (600 m), from top to base, the base being about 200 feet (60 m) below the surface of the lake.

A path runs the length of the lake, through the boulders and scree fall at the base of the craggy fell-side. On the northwestern side are the cliffs of Buckbarrow (a part of Seatallan) and the upturned-boat shape of Yewbarrow. Wast Water is the source of the River Irt which flows into the Irish Sea near Ravenglass.

Both the lake and Wasdale Screes are protected as Sites of Special Scientific Interest and under European Union law as Special Areas of Conservation.

== Points of interest ==
=== The Lady in the Lake ===
In 1976, the "Wasdale Lady in the Lake", Margaret Hogg, was murdered by her husband and her body was disposed of in the lake. She was found after eight years, with her body preserved like wax due to the lack of oxygen in the water.

=== Underwater gnomes ===
In February 2005 it was reported that a "gnome garden" complete with picket fence had been placed in the lake as a point of interest for divers to explore. It was removed from the bottom of Wastwater after three divers died in the late 1990s. It is thought the divers spent too much time too deep searching for the ornaments. Police divers report a rumour that the garden had been replaced at a depth beyond the lowest the police were allowed to dive.

PC Kenny McMahon, a member of the North West Police Underwater Search Unit, said

Wastwater is quite clear at the bottom, but there's nothing to see. At a depth of about 48 m [157 ft], divers had taken gnomes down and put a picket fence around them. But several years ago there were a number of fatalities and the Lake District National Park Authority asked us to get rid of them. We went down there, put them in bags and removed the lot. But now there's a rumour about a new garden beyond the 50 m [160 ft] depth limit. As police divers we can't legally dive any deeper so, if it exists, the new garden could have been purposefully put out of our reach.

=== Water extraction ===
Water was first pumped from the lake during World War II to supply the Royal Ordnance Factory at Drigg. It is pumped to the nearby Sellafield nuclear facility as an industrial water supply. The Nuclear Decommissioning Authority is allowed to extract from the lake a maximum of 4,000,000 imperial gallons (18,000 m^{3}) a day to use on that site.

=== Favourite view ===
On 9 September 2007, Wast Water was announced as the winner of a vote to determine "Britain's Favourite View" by viewers of ITV.

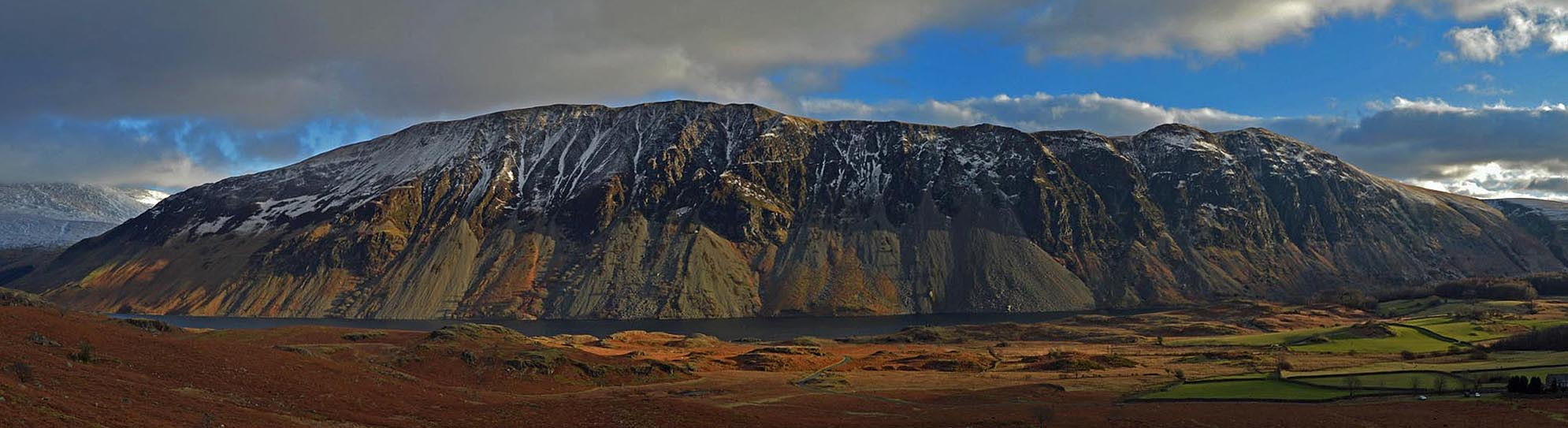
Panorama of the Wasdale screes, Illgill Head in the centre, Whin Rigg on the right.

=== Gallery ===
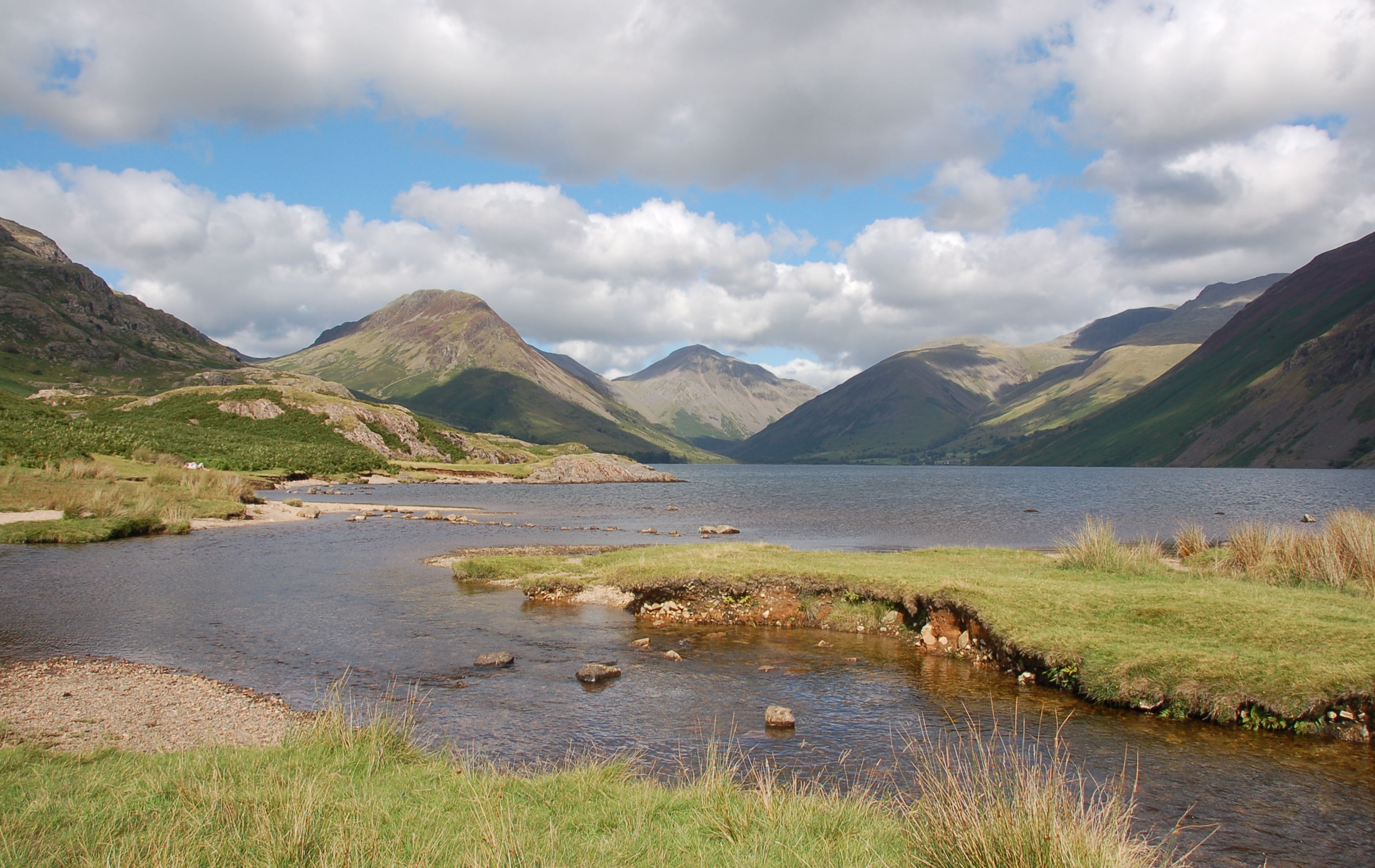
Wasdale from the shores of Wastwater. Yewbarrow is on the left, Great Gable in the centre and the Scafell range on the right.

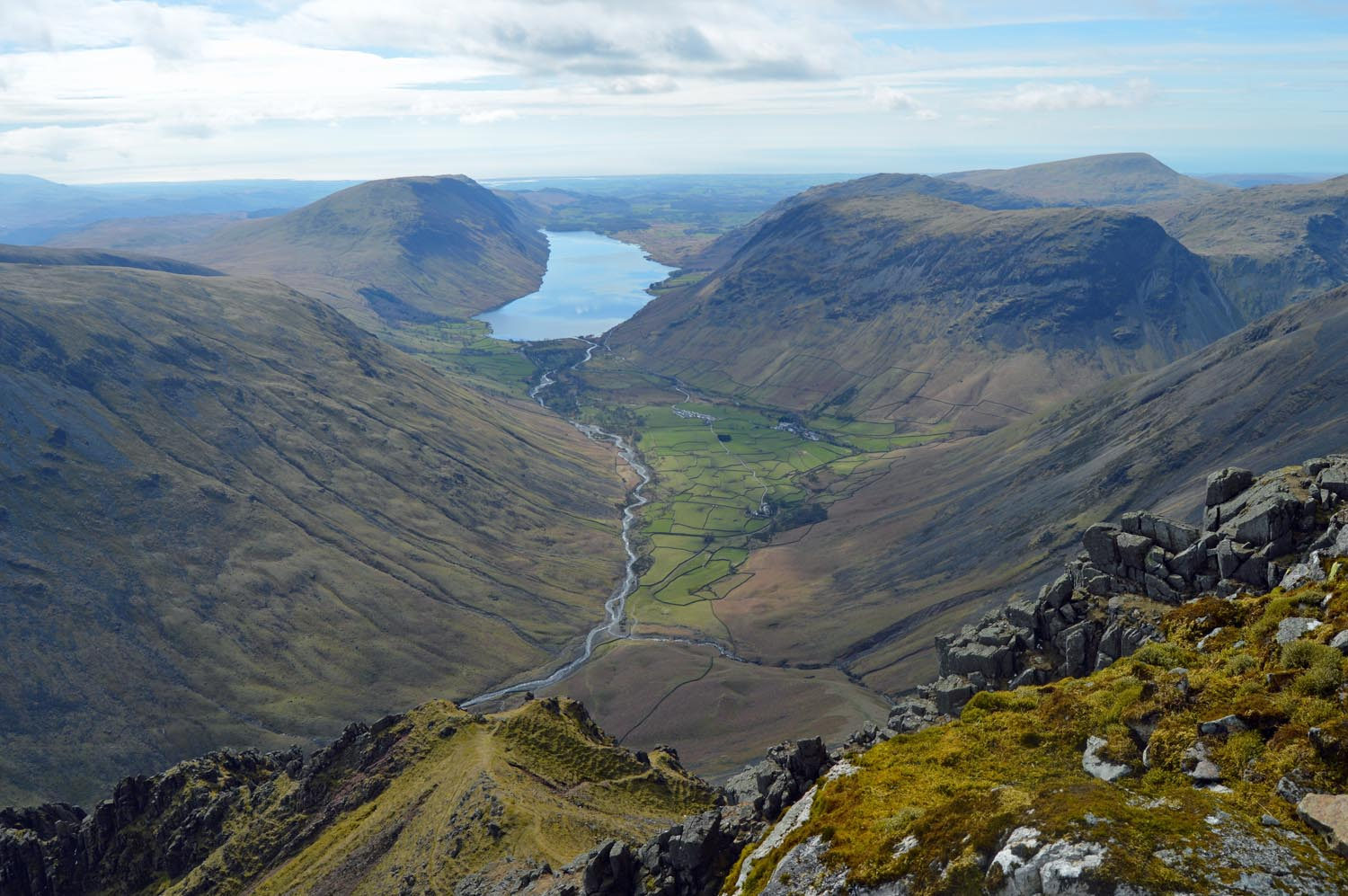
The view from the cairn put up by the Westmorland Brothers to the SW of the summit of Great Gable - Wastwater in the distance.

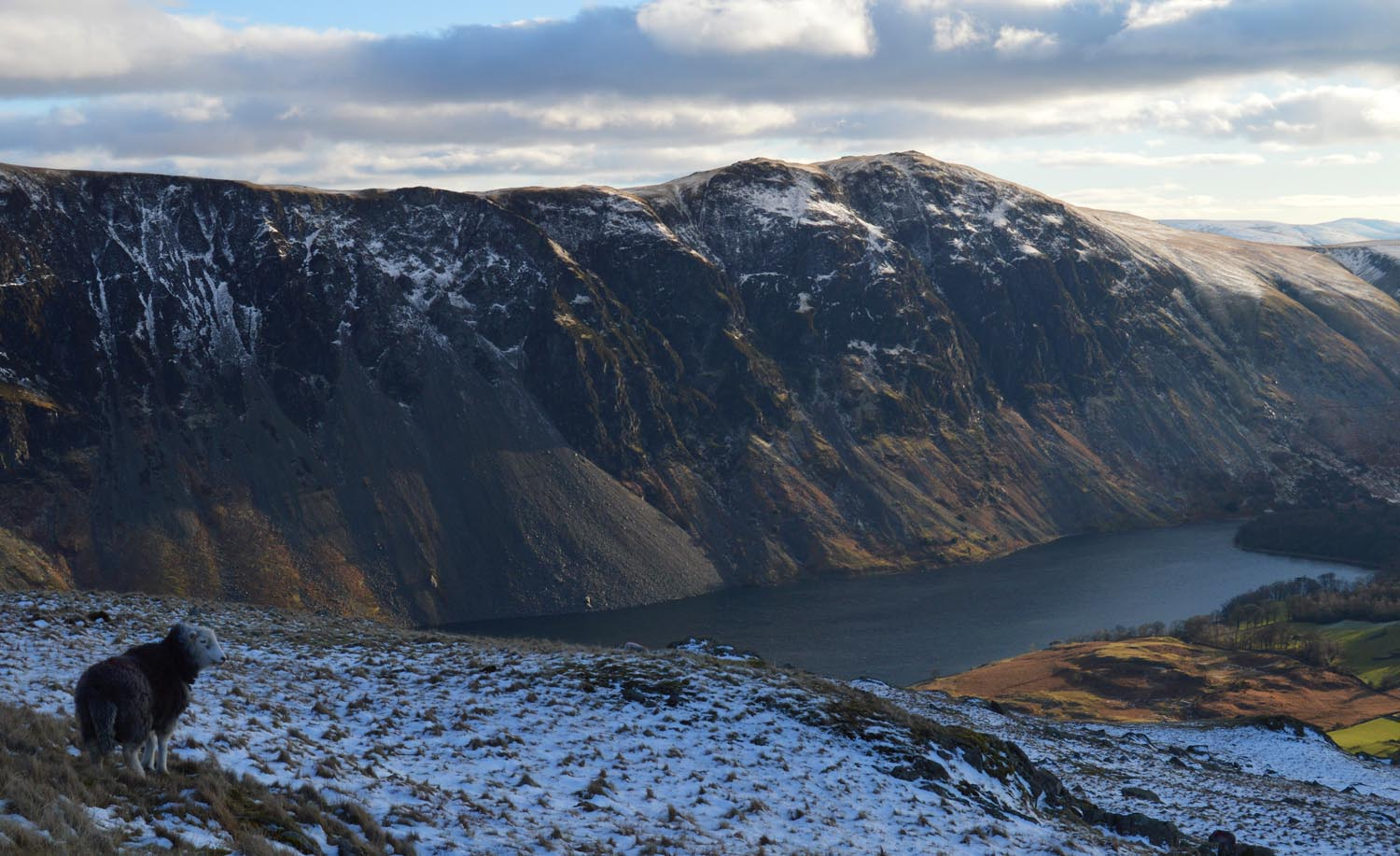
Illgill Head with Wastwater at its foot.

Wastwater looking towards Wasdale Head

== Tributaries ==
Clockwise from River Irt

- Countess Beck
- Smithy Beck
- Goat Gill
- Nether Beck
- Over Beck
- Mosedale Beck
- Lingmell Beck
- Hollow Gill
- Straighthead Gill

== In literature ==
In the book Goodbye, Mr. Chips, Mr Chipping meets his wife at Wasdale Head.
