= Wellington, Cumbria =

Village in Cumbria, England

Coordinates: 54°25′19″N 3°25′20″W

Wellington
- Location in Copeland Borough Location within Cumbria
- OS grid reference: NY078039
- Civil parish: Gosforth
- Unitary authority: Cumberland
- Ceremonial county: Cumbria
- Region: North West
- Country: England
- Sovereign state: United Kingdom
- Post town: SEASCALE
- Postcode district: CA20
- Police: Cumbria
- Fire: Cumbria
- Ambulance: North West
- UK Parliament: Whitehaven and Workington

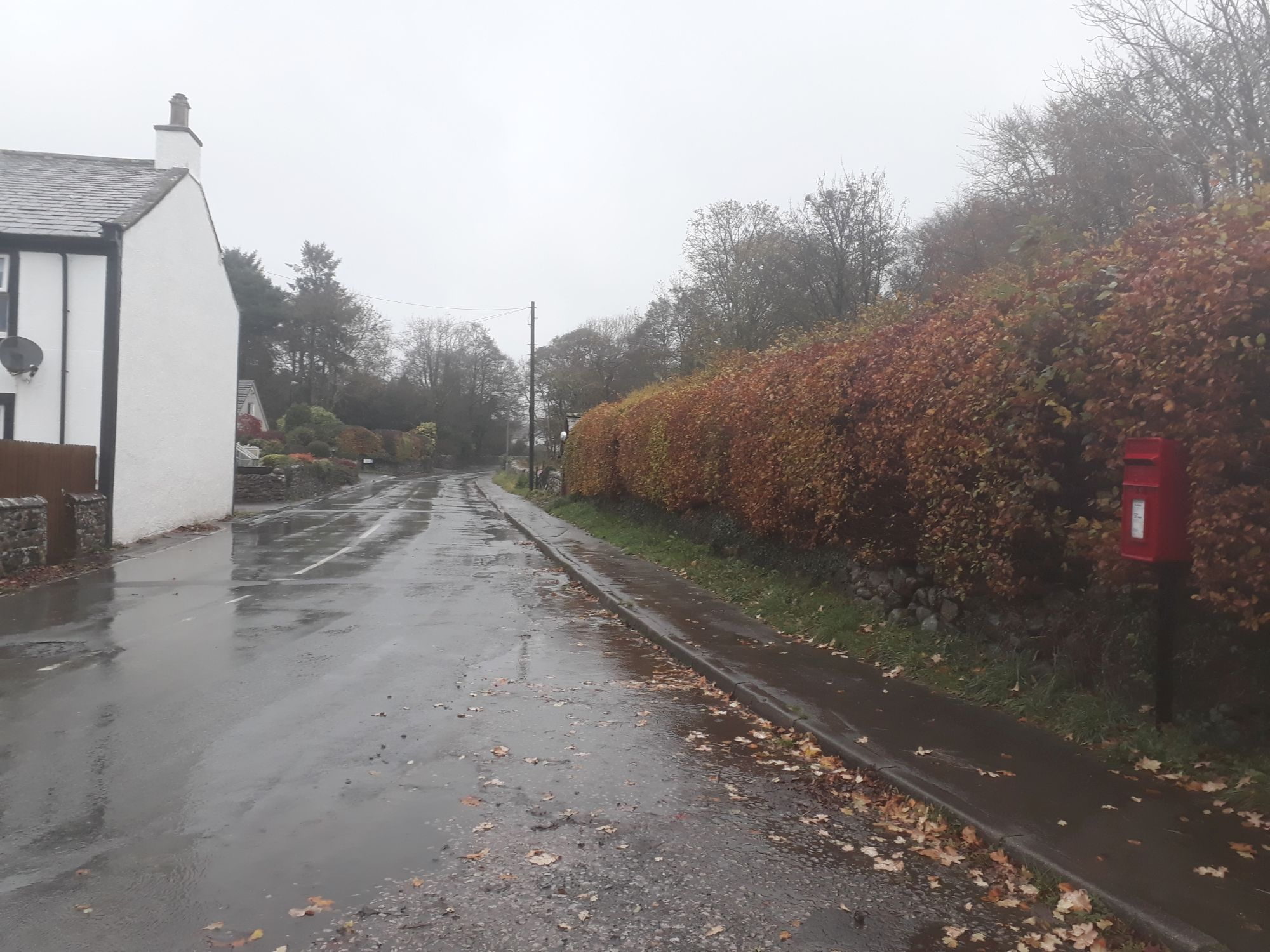
The main road through Wellington in 2018

Wellington is a small village in the civil parish of Gosforth, Cumberland, Cumbria, England, lying north east of Gosforth beside the River Bleng A bridge at Wellington carries the Gosforth to Wasdale road over the river. Hall Croft, Wellington, is a late 18th- or early 19th-century house and a grade II listed building.
