= Santon Bridge =

Village in Cumbria, England

Coordinates: 54.402°N 3.371°W

- The bridge and the Bridge Inn at Santon Bridge

- Location in Copeland Borough Location within Cumbria
- Population: 316 (2011)
- OS grid reference: NY110016
- Civil parish: Irton with Santon
- Unitary authority: Cumberland
- Ceremonial county: Cumbria
- Region: North West
- Country: England
- Sovereign state: United Kingdom
- Post town: HOLMROOK
- Postcode district: CA19
- Dialling code: 019467
- Police: Cumbria
- Fire: Cumbria
- Ambulance: North West
- UK Parliament: Whitehaven and Workington

Santon Bridge is a small village in Cumberland, Cumbria, England, at a bridge over the River Irt. The civil parish is called Irton with Santon. The population of this civil parish as at the 2011 census was 316. The Bridge Inn is the venue for the annual World's Biggest Liar competition.

== See also ==
- Listed buildings in Irton with Santon
