= St James' Church, Arnside =

Coordinates: 54.2018°N 2.8317°W

St James' Church
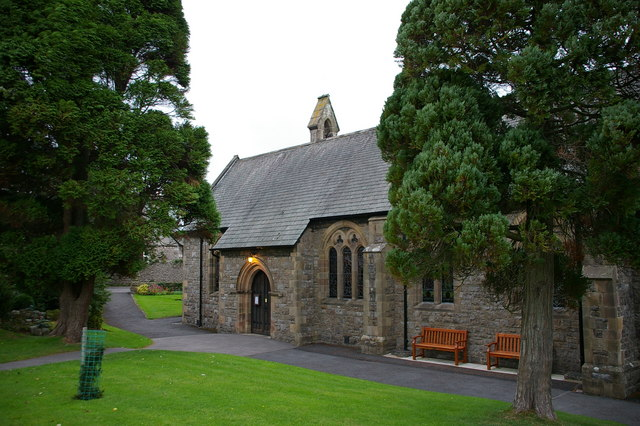
- St James' Church from the southeast

- Location in South Lakeland Location in Cumbria
- OS grid reference: SD 45843 78768
- Location: Arnside, Cumbria
- Country: England
- Denomination: Anglican
- Website: St James, Arnside

History
- Status: Parish church

Architecture
- Functional status: Active
- Architect(s): Miles Thompson; Stephen Shaw; R. Morton Rigg; Austin and Paley
- Architectural type: Church
- Style: Gothic Revival
- Groundbreaking: 1864
- Completed: 1914

Administration
- Province: York
- Diocese: Carlisle
- Archdeaconry: Westmorland and Furness
- Deanery: Kendal
- Parish: St James, Arnside

Clergy
- Vicar: Andrew B. Norman

St James' Church is in the village of Arnside, Cumbria, England. It is an active Anglican parish church in the deanery of Kendal, the archdeaconry of Westmorland and Furness, and the diocese of Carlisle.

== History ==
The church originated as a small building consisting of a nave and chancel, built in 1864–66, and designed by Miles Thompson. It was extended towards the west in 1884 by Stephen Shaw, further enlarged to the north in 1905 by R. Morton Rigg. A south aisle was added in 1912–14 by the Lancaster architects Austin and Paley.

== Architecture ==
The plan of the church includes a nave with a clerestory, a lean-to north aisle, a south aisle under its own roof, and a chancel. Arising from the roof of the south aisle is a pair of dormers, one higher than the other. Inside the church, the north arcade is carried on octagonal piers, and the south arcade on taller round piers. The stained glass in the east window dates from 1880 and was designed by F. Burrow of Milnthorpe. The two-manual pipe organ was built in about 1920 by Hope-Jones, and refurbished in 1993 by M. Fletcher of Halifax.

== See also ==
- List of ecclesiastical works by Austin and Paley (1895–1914)
