= Illgill Head =

Mountain in United Kingdom

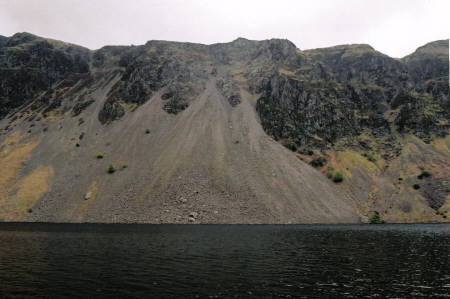

Highest point
- Elevation: 609 m (1,998 ft)
- Prominence: 314 m (1,030 ft)
- Parent peak: Scafell Pike
- Listing: Marilyn, Wainwright
- Coordinates: 54°25′58″N 3°16′57″W

Geography
- Location within the Lake District Location within the former Borough of Copeland
- Location: Cumbria, England
- Parent range: Lake District, Southern Fells
- OS grid: NY169049
- Topo map: OS Landranger 89, Explorer OL6

Illgill Head is a fell in the English Lake District. It is known more commonly as the northern portion of the Wastwater Screes. The fell is 609 metres (1,998 ft) high and stands along the south-east shore of Wastwater, the deepest lake in England.

== Topography ==
The panorama of the Wastwater Screes across Wastwater is one of the most famous and awe-inspiring views in England. Poet Norman Nicholson described the Screes as ‘like the inverted arches of a Gothic Cathedral’. The title Wastwater Screes applies to the scree-covered north-western fellside which plunges dramatically down into Wastwater. This also includes Illgill Head's neighbour Whin Rigg, the continuation of the ridge to the south-west. The scree slope continues beneath the lake to a depth of 79 metres (259 ft). The screes were formed as a result of ice and weathering erosion on the rocks. Geologically, Illgill Head and Whin Rigg are part of the Borrowdale Volcanic Group, typical for the southern-western area of the Lake District. In marked contrast to the north-western slope, the opposite flank of the fell, which descends to Burnmoor Tarn and Miterdale, is much gentler and covered in heather and bracken.

== Geology ==
The summit area has outcropping tuff, lapilli tuff and breccia of the Lingmell Formation amid the drift deposits. The crags atop the Screes reveal the plagioclase-phyric andesite lavas of the Birker Fell Formation.

== Summit ==
The summit is a flat sheepwalk, giving no clue to the drama of the Screes. North-west from the cairn the grassy plateau gradually tilts, until a few yards away it simply disappears over the brink. Illgill Head is a fine viewpoint for Wasdale Head, the surrounding fells all appearing as they soar up from the dalehead. Nearer views, with care, are possible down the Screes themselves.

- Panorama

== Ascent ==
Illgill Head is commonly ascended from Wasdale Head over the north-eastern shoulder of the fell, skirting the edge of the Screes. There is also an ascent from Boot in Eskdale either over Whin Rigg or direct via Burnmoor Tarn. A lakeside path along the south-eastern shore of Wastwater starts at Wasdale Head Hall and continues through the boulder field with exhilarating close-up views of the Screes.

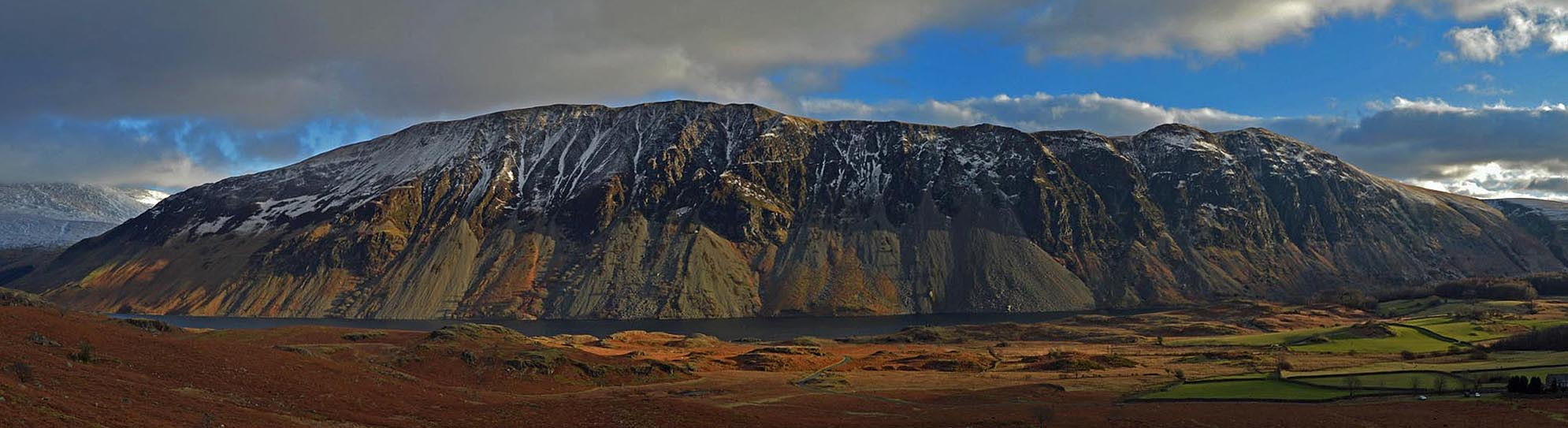
Panorama of the Wasdale Screes, Illgill Head in the centre, Whin Rigg on the right.
