= River Irt =

River in Cumbria, England

Coordinates: 54°22′N 3°25′W

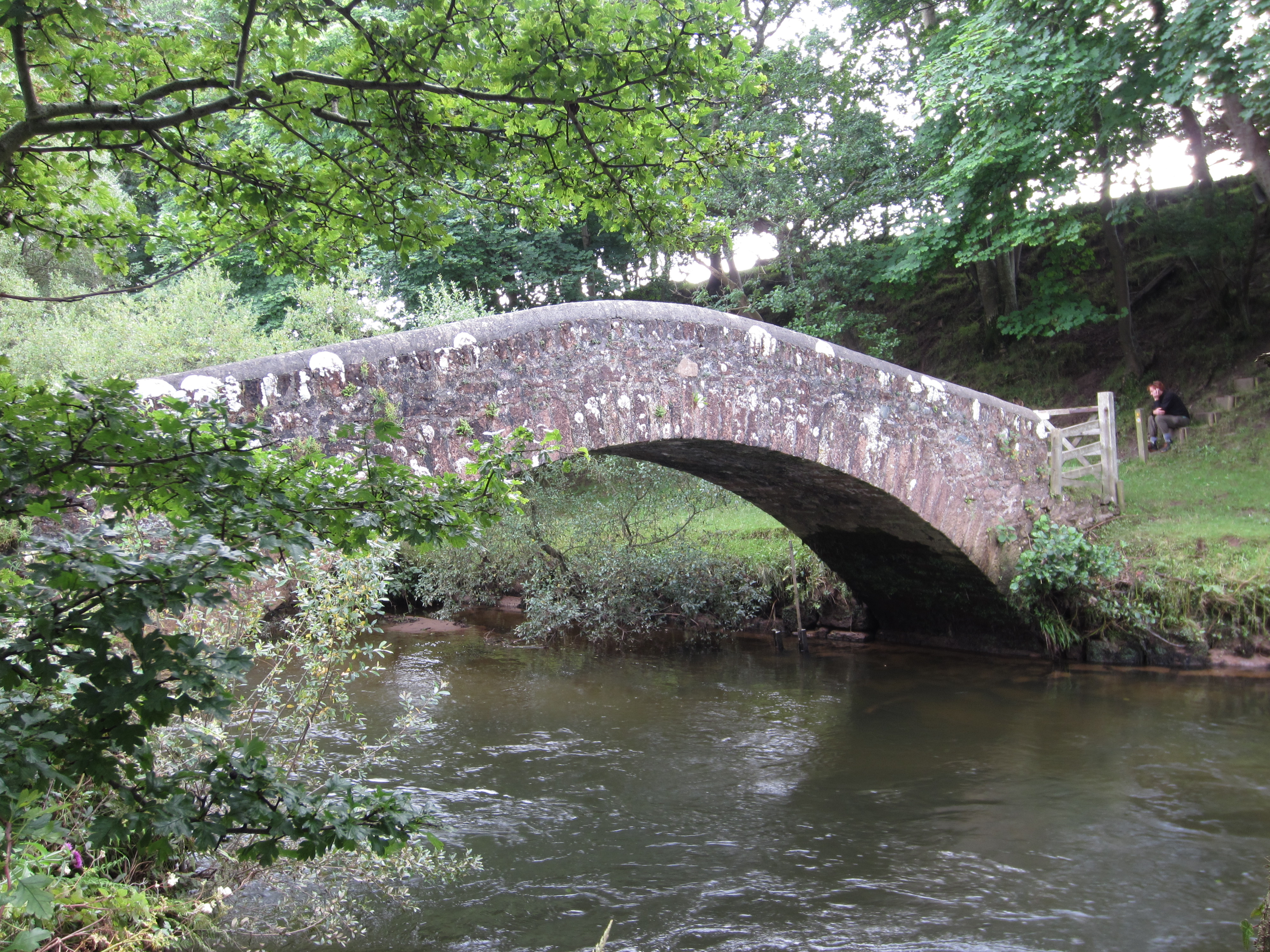
Drigg Holme Packhorse Bridge over the River Irt

The River Irt is a river in the county of Cumbria in northern England. It flows for approximately 14 miles (22 km) from its source in Wast Water to its estuary at Ravenglass.

The name of the river is believed to derive either from the Old English gyr which means "mud", or from the Brittonic words *ar, "flowing", or *īr, "fresh, clean, pure", suffixed with -ed, a nominal suffix meaning "having the quality of...".

== Course ==
The River Irt flows from the south-western end of Wast Water, the deepest lake in England. Wast Water is fed by a number of streams, but principally the Mosedale and Lingmell becks that enter the lake at its eastern end, on the north-western side of Scafell Pike. The Irt leaves the lake at the foot of Whin Rigg, the southern peak of the famous Wastwater Screes, and flows in a south-westerly direction. In its first few miles the river receives the waters of the Greathall, Cinderdale, Black and Kid becks, and passes the village of Nether Wasdale, before reaching its confluence with the River Bleng.

The River Irt then flows through the villages of Santon Bridge and Holmrook, where it is crossed by the A595 coast road. The river then passes just to the south of Drigg. At Drigg Holme packhorse bridge it is crossed by the Cumbria Coastal Way long-distance footpath, and shortly thereafter by the Cumbrian Coast railway line just south of Drigg railway station. Between the footpath and railway bridges the river becomes tidal.

After the railway bridge, the River Irt widens into an estuary and turns south, flowing through the Drigg Dunes and Irt Estuary Nature Reserve before joining the River Esk and River Mite at Ravenglass.

== Ecology ==
In the 19th century the River Irt was famous for the extremely rare black pearls that grew in its freshwater pearl mussels. Poaching of the pearls was thought to have led to the mussels becoming extinct in the River Irt, however, a very small number have survived. The West Cumbria Rivers Trust carried out conservation work on the river between February 2015 and February 2018 to try and protect the habitat and prevent the complete eradication of the freshwater mussel from the river. In 2023, evidence of mussels reproducing in the river was found for the first time since 2010.
