= Bamse (dog) =

Dog and military mascot (1937–1944)

- Bamse wearing a Royal Norwegian Navy sailor's cap
- Species: Canis familiaris
- Breed: St. Bernard
- Sex: Male
- Born: 1937; Oslo, Norway
- Died: 22 July 1944 (aged 6–7); Montrose, Scotland
- Resting place: Montrose, Scotland
- Nationality: Norwegian
- Occupation: Military mascot
- Employer: Royal Norwegian Navy
- Years active: 9 February 1940-22 July 1944
- Known for: Symbol of Norwegian freedom during World War II
- Owner: Erling Hafto
- Awards: (Norway) Norges Hundeorden (United Kingdom) PDSA Gold Medal
- http://www.bamsemontrose.co.uk/

Bamse (Norwegian word for "(male) bear", "teddy bear" or "big boy") (1937 – 22 July 1944) was a St. Bernard dog that became the heroic mascot of the Free Norwegian Forces during the Second World War. He became a symbol of Norwegian freedom during the war.

== Pre-war life ==
Bamse was bought in Oslo, Norway, by Captain Erling Hafto, the master of the Norwegian whale-catcher Thorodd, and he was taken to sea from an early age. In her childhood memories of pre-war Honningsvåg, Captain Hafto's daughter Vigdis remembers Bamse as a very kind dog that would look after the children while they were playing.

== Military service ==
At the onset of the Second World War, Thorodd was drafted into the Royal Norwegian Navy as a coastal patrol vessel, based in Hammerfest, and Bamse was enrolled as an official crew member on 9 February 1940. After the Nazi invasion of Norway on 9 April 1940 the Thorodd was part of the naval opposition to the Germans and had as one of its uses POW transport.

Shortly before the 10 June 1940 capitulation of mainland Norway, Thorodd was one of 13 Norwegian naval vessels to escape to the UK, arriving 17 June 1940. She was converted to a minesweeper in Rosyth from 30 June 1940 and stationed in Montrose and Dundee in Scotland, where she remained for the rest of the war.

Bamse being given a bath aboard the minesweeper HNoMS Thorodd

=== Bamse and his crew ===
Bamse lifted the morale of the ship's crew, and became well known to the local civilian population. In battle, he would stand on the front gun tower of the boat, and the crew made him a special metal helmet.

His acts of heroism included saving a young lieutenant commander who had been attacked by a man wielding a knife by pushing the assailant into the sea, and dragging back to shore a sailor who had fallen overboard. He was also known for breaking up fights amongst his crewmates by putting his paws on their shoulders, calming them down and then leading them back to the ship.

One of Bamse's tasks in Scotland was to round up his crew and escort them back to the ship in time for duty or curfew. To do this, he travelled on the local buses unaccompanied, and the crew bought him a bus pass which was attached to his collar. Bamse would wander down to the bus stop at Broughty Ferry Road and take the bus down to Dundee. He would get off at the bus stop near his crew's favourite watering hole, the Bodega Bar, and go in to fetch them. If he could not locate his friends he would take the bus back to base.

=== Patriotic symbol ===
From being ship's mascot, Bamse became the mascot of the Royal Norwegian Navy, and then of all the Free Norwegian Forces. An iconic photograph of him wearing a Norwegian sailor's cap was used on patriotic Easter cards and Christmas cards during the war. The PDSA made him an official Allied Forces Mascot.

== Death ==
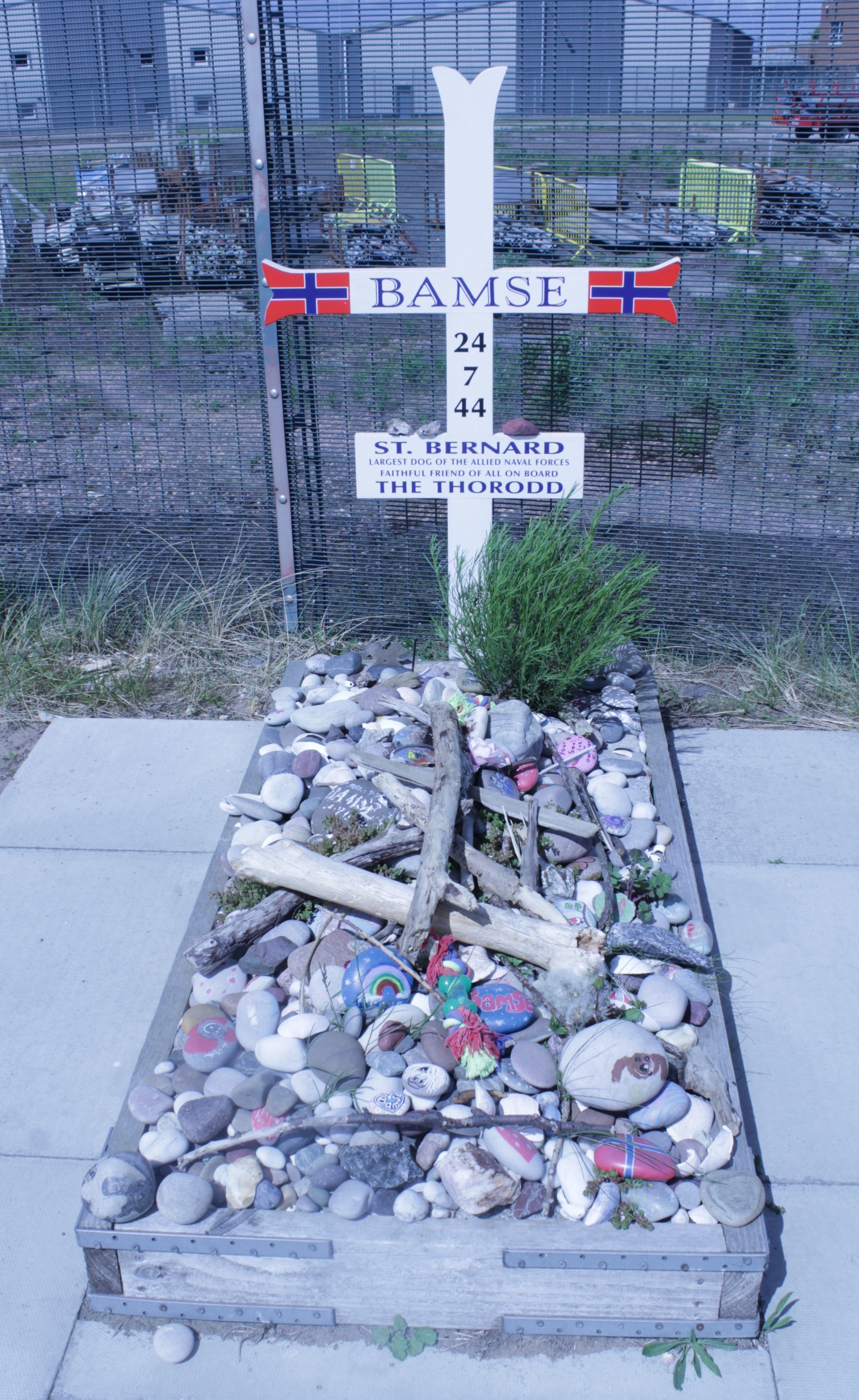
Bamse's grave, Montrose harbour

Bamse died of heart failure on the dockside at Montrose on 22 July 1944. He was buried with full military honours. Hundreds of Norwegian sailors, Allied servicemen, schoolchildren and townsfolk from Montrose and Dundee attended his funeral.

His grave site lies off Ferry Road/Barracks Road in the eastern section of Montrose harbour on a section of pedestrian walkway beyond the industrial estate. It is cared for by local people, and the Royal Norwegian Navy holds a commemorative ceremony every ten years.

== Post-war honours ==
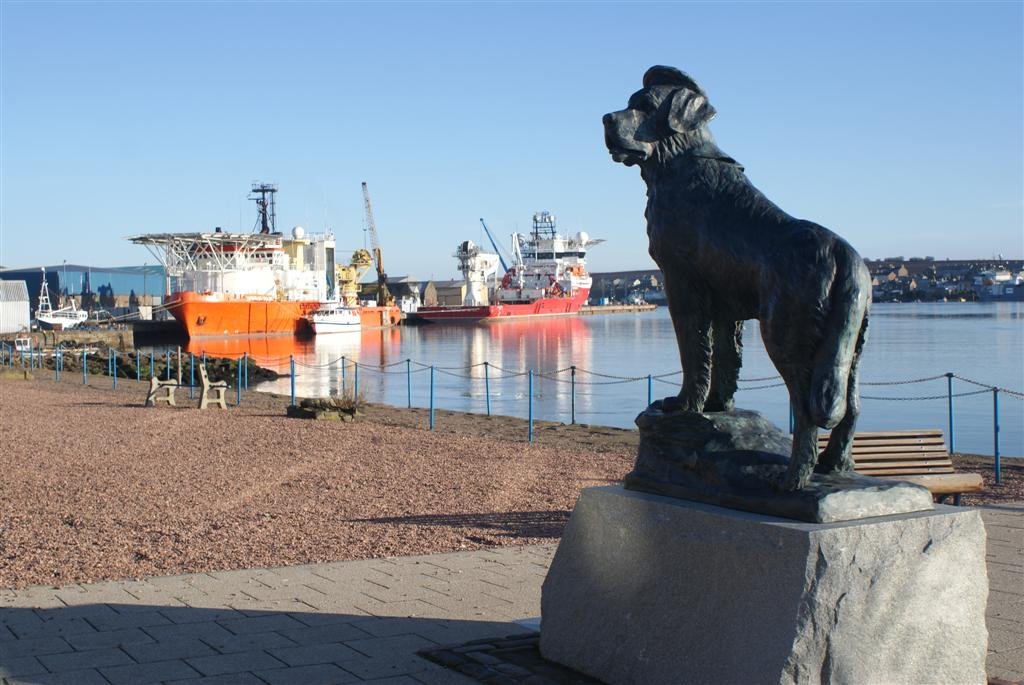
Statue of Bamse at Montrose Harbour

Bamse was posthumously awarded Norges Hundeorden (Norwegian Order of Dogs) on 30 September 1984 for his war service. In 2006, he was also awarded the PDSA Gold Medal (sometimes known as the "animals' George Cross") for gallantry and devotion to duty, the only World War II animal to have received this honour.

On 17 October 2006, The Duke of York unveiled a larger than life sized bronze statue of Bamse, made by Scottish sculptor Alan Herriot, on Montrose's Wharf Street. The Norwegian consul in Edinburgh, Bjørn Eilertsen, brought greetings from Norway's king, Harald V. Other attendees included the Lathallan School Pipe Band, Royal Norwegian Navy representatives, Hans Petter Oset (director of the Royal Norwegian Navy Museum), and Vigdis Hafto (the daughter of Bamse's owner).

In August 2008 author and columnist Angus Whitson and Andrew Orr of the Montrose Bamse Project published a new book, Sea Dog Bamse. The book charts Bamse's life – from prewar days in Honningsvåg, through the five years of war, until his heartfelt death. Using extensive source material and new eyewitness accounts, it relates stories of the Hafto family, the Norwegian Campaign, the minesweeper Thorodd and its crew, the naval war off East Scotland, and the bonds between the Norwegians and the Scots. The hardback version became a Scottish bestseller, and a paperback version was released in October 2009.

Media attention renewed interest in Bamse in Norway. The Royal Norwegian Navy Museum (Marinemuseet) at Horten planned to install a smaller bronze version of the statue. In addition, the mayor of Nordkapp Municipality (which includes the town of Honningsvåg), Kristina Hansen, and project manager Sigurd Berg-Hansen visited Montrose in November 2008, and launched a campaign to raise funds to purchase and install a duplicate bronze statue of Bamse on the waterfront at Honningsvåg, which currently has about 250,000 annual visitors. In December 2008 the Norwegian Minister of Defence, Anne-Grete Strøm-Erichsen announced that her ministry supported the Bamse project in Honningsvåg and would grant 70,000 kr to the memorial statue.

On 16 May 2009 Royal Norwegian Navy cutter MV Leikvin transported a Bamse statue from the Port of Leith, Scotland to Honningsvåg. On 19 June 2009 schoolchildren from Honningsvåg and from Montrose unveiled the statue on the Honningsvåg harbour, in front of the museum (which tells his story in detail). The combined bands of the Skolekorps and Lathallan School's pipe band entertained the large crowd of supporters from Scotland, Norway, Sweden and Canada. The new statue of Bamse at Honningsvåg faces south-west towards Montrose, and the Scottish statue faces north-east towards Honningsvåg.

During 2016 a 17-acre (6.9 ha) forest was planted at Guards Lonning, Nether Wasdale, Cumbria (grid reference NY 108 056) in honour of Bamse. The scheme Bamse's Wood was supported by the Forestry Commission.

The Annual Bamse Cup Regatta hosted at the Dartmouth Yacht Club is named in his honour, sponsored by the Convoy Cup Foundation.

== See also ==
- Just Nuisance
- List of individual dogs

== Bibliography ==
- Sea Dog Bamse, World War II Canine Hero: Angus Whitson & Andrew Orr ISBN 1-84158-748-6
- They Also Serve : Dorothea St. Hill Bourne (1947)
- Animals in War: Jilly Cooper (1983, re-issued 2000) ISBN 0-552-99091-4
- Skipshunden Bamse og andre hunder ("The Ship's Dog Bamse and other Dogs"): Otto Opstad (1987) ISBN 82-7334-114-3 (in Norwegian)
- Silent Heroes : Evelyn le Cheyne (1994, re-issued 2008) ISBN 0-285-63214-0
- Scotland's Heroes: John Linsey (2007) ISBN 1-904440-87-8
- Fem År På Banjeren ("Five Years on the Banger): Frank Abelsen ISBN 82-993416-0-4 (in Norwegian)
- Norske Minesveipere : Frank Abelsen (1999) ISBN 82-994738-5-3 (in Norwegian)
- Sea Dog Bamse : Angus Whitson and Andrew Orr. Brilinn (2008) ISBN 978-1-84158-748-6
