= Bamse's Wood =

Nature reserve in Cumbria, England

Coordinates: 54.438413°N 3.376033°W

Bamse's Wood is a newly planted forest and nature reserve that sits between Gosforth and Nether Wasdale in the Lake District, Cumbria, England. The 17-acre (6.9 ha) reserve is approached via Guards Lonning an ancient bridleway.

The Forestry Commission supported and gave advice for the scheme which has the effect of forming a wildlife corridor between the commission's own Blengdale Forest to the north and Meolbank Plantation along with Bolton Wood to the south which is owned by the National Trust.

The planting of the wood is designed to provide a habitat for the endangered red squirrel and allow mobility for the squirrel between forests. Tree species are predominantly indigenous deciduous with an accent on fruit and nut producing types.

The wood is named after Bamse, the St Bernard dog that was the mascot of the Free Norwegian forces during World War II. The wood was bought and planted to offset the carbon footprint of the children's book about the dog written by Anna Mandell, who suffered from motor neuron disease and whose ashes were buried in a small garden area within the woodland in September 2016.
