= St Olaf's Church, Wasdale =

Church in Wasdale Head, Cumbria, England

Coordinates: 54.4671°N 3.2535°W

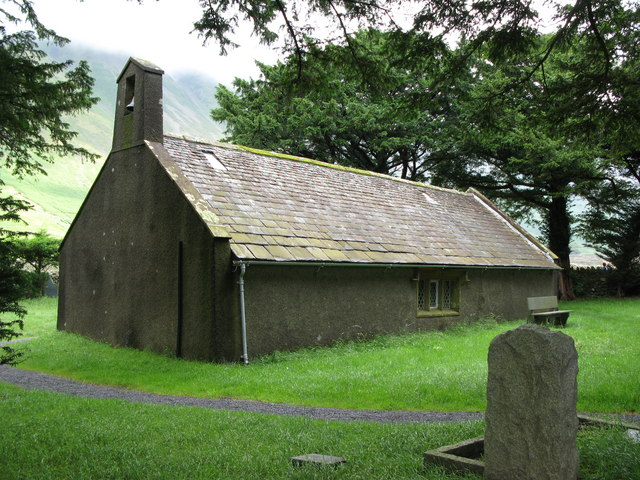
St Olaf's Church, Wasdale Head

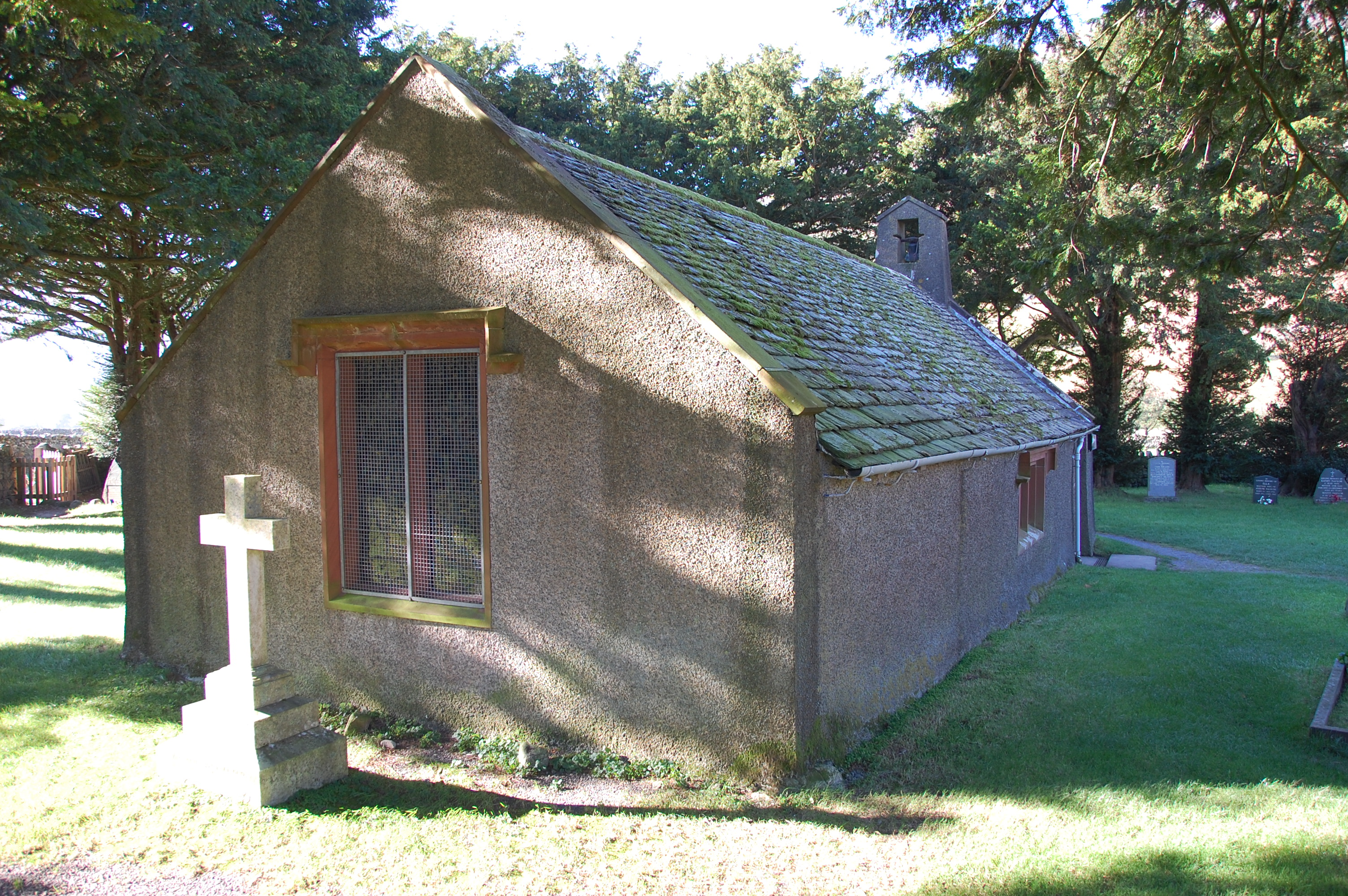
St Olaf's Church, Wasdale Head

St Olaf's Church in Wasdale Head, Cumbria, is England's smallest parish church. The earliest record of a church on this site is from 1550, though it is likely that there was an earlier church on this site.

== History ==
The church was dedicated to St Olaf in 1977, before which it had no name. The rector at that time, the Reverend Raymond Bowers, had friends in Norway, and it was he who suggested the name. A guide to the church and the Wasdale valley, The Vikings: Wasdale Head and Their Church, is available in the Barn Door Shop at Wasdale Head.

The church has long been associated with British climbers. The south window has a small pane within it with an etching of Napes Needle on Great Gable. A well-attended silence is kept every year on Remembrance Sunday at 11 am.

The church is recorded in the National Heritage List for England as a designated Grade II listed building. The parish of Wasdale Head is within the Calder deanery of the Diocese of Carlisle.

The church is one of three in the Parish of Gosforth & Wasdale, the other two being St Mary's Church, Gosforth and St Michael & All Angels, Nether Wasdale. The Rector is John Riley, assisted by his ordained wife, Lesley, and curate Alison. The churchwardens in 2020 are Andrew Lopez and Hugh Foulerton.

== Visitor information ==
The church is usually open to visitors each day, and attracts many thousands of visitors each year from around the globe: in 2019 12,500 visitors from 43 countries and 7 of the 8 continents (the eighth continent being Antarctica). As well as a Visitors Book at the back of the church, a Prayer Book is kept near the front where Prayer Requests may be written. The Book is read regularly and acknowledged by ministers, people and situations are then prayed for. These are usually also included at the next Service. Services are usually held at 11.30am on the 2nd and 4th Sundays of each month, feathering in with services at Nether Wasdale Church (at the other end of the Lake) on the 1st and 3rd Sundays. In 2020 public services were suspended due to the COVID-19 pandemic, and all three churches in the parish were closed until the restrictions were lifted. (Visitor information from St Olaf's visitors book)

== See also ==
- Listed buildings in Wasdale
