= Sørvågen =

Sørvågen may refer to the following locations in Norway:

- Sørvågen, Moskenes, a village in Moskenes municipality, Nordland county
- Sørvågen, Øksnes, a village in Øksnes municipality, Nordland county
- Sørvågen, a part of Honningsvåg in Nordkapp municipality, Finnmark county
