= SS Fleurus =

Two steamships have borne the name Fleurus, after Fleurus in Belgium:

- SS Fleurus (1919) was a 355-ton vessel built as a trawler in 1919, by Foundation Co, of Savannah, US. Converted to cargo ship in 1925. Served as the patrol boat Thorodd during the Second World War. Sank in 1955.
- SS Fleurus (1926) was a 1,122-ton cargo ship built in 1926, by Seine Maritime in France. Re-engined to diesel in 1950, suffered fire on 26 June 1963 and was scuttled in October the same year.
