= Listed buildings in Wasdale =

Wasdale is a civil parish in the Cumberland district, Cumbria, England. It contains eight listed buildings that are recorded in the National Heritage List for England. Of these, one is listed at Grade II*, the middle of the three grades, and the others are at Grade II, the lowest grade. The parish is in the Lake District National Park. It contains the village of Nether Wasdale and the community of Wasdale Head, together with the countryside, moorland and mountains surrounding Wastwater. The listed buildings comprise two churches, two farmhouses and associated buildings, two bridges, a boundary stone, and a maypole.

== Key ==
Grade	Criteria
II*	Particularly important buildings of more than special interest
II	Buildings of national importance and special interest

== Buildings ==
Name and location	Photograph	Date	Notes	Grade
St Olav's Church; 54.46710°N 3.25351°W		c. 1550	A small church in pebbledashed stone on a plinth with walls 3 feet (0.91 m) thick and 5 feet (1.5 m) high, overhanging eaves, and a slate roof with stone copings. It is in a single cell, with a bellcote on the west gable. The windows are mullioned with hood moulds.	II
St Michael's Church; 54.42450°N 3.35043°W		17th century	The north aisle was added in 1830. The church has a domestic appearance, it is in pebbledashed stone, and has a slate roof with stone copings. The church consists of a single cell with a north aisle and a bellcote on the west gable. Inside the church the ceiling has decorative bosses, and paintings including texts and the royal arms of George III.	II*
Stang Ends, farm cottage, barn and house 54.42076°N 3.36078°W	—	Early to mid 18th century (probable)	Originally a cottage and a barn, the barn was remodelled and the house was added in 1778. The cottage and house are pebbledashed, the barn is in stone with quoins, and the roofs are slated. There are two storeys, the cottage has a symmetrical front of three bays with a central doorway and mullioned windows containing casements. The house to the right has two bays, sash windows, and a round-headed stair window at the rear. The barn to the left has three bays, a partly blocked door and two loft doors.	II
Craghouse Bridge; 54.41047°N 3.38079°W		18th century (probable)	The bridge carries a road over he River Irt. It is in stone, and consists of a single segmental arch with a span about 30 feet (9.1 m) and a roadway 6.5 feet (2.0 m) wide. The parapet is 3 feet (0.91 m) high with flat copings and splayed ends.	II
Row Bridge; 54.46822°N 3.25672°W		18th century (probable)	A packhorse bridge consisting of a single segmental arch with a span of about 15 feet (4.6 m) and a pathway about 3 feet (0.91 m) wide. It is constructed of slate wedges, end-on, and is self-supporting. There is no parapet, and the pathway is concreted.	II
Woodhow Farmhouse, byres, walls, and pump 54.42604°N 3.32699°W	—	1757	The house is pebbledashed, the byre range is in stone with quoins, there are two storeys, and the roofs are in slate. The house has three bays, a central doorway with a moulded head, one casement window and three sash windows, all in stone surrounds. The byre range to the east has three bays, three doors, two fixed windows and two loft doors. At the rear is a lead pump dated 1826 in stone housing with a shaped head. In front of the house is a stone area wall.	II
Boundary stone 54.44978°N 3.28487°W	—	Mid to late 19th century (probable)	The boundary stone is in sandstone. It consists of a block about 2 feet (0.61 m) high, with a weathered inscription on the west face.	II
Maypole; 54.42420°N 3.35081°W	—	1897	The maypole was erected to celebrate the Diamond Jubilee of Queen Victoria. It consists of a chamfered sandstone plinth and a tapering cast iron column about 30 feet (9.1 m) high. On the lower part of the column is a crown in low relief, and on the plinth is an inscribed brass plaque.	II
