= Honningsvåg =

City/town within Nordkapp Municipality, Finnmark, Norway

Honningsvåg: Honningsvåg (Norwegian); Honnesváhki (Northern Sami); Vooki (Kven)
- Town/City
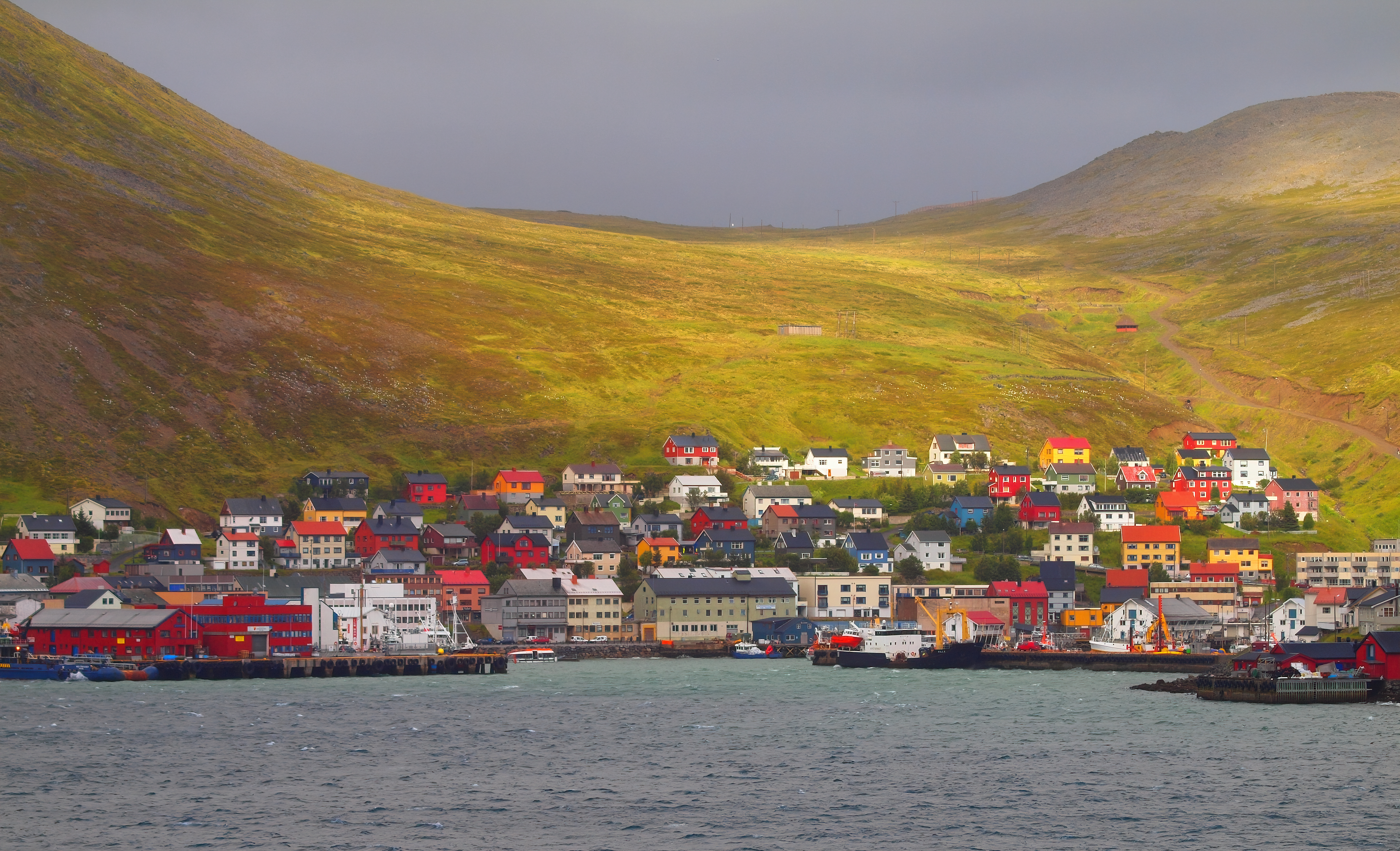
- View of the town
- Interactive map of Honningsvåg
- Location within Finnmark Location within Norway
- Coordinates: 70°58′43″N 25°58′36″E
- Country: Norway
- Region: Northern Norway
- County: Finnmark
- District: Vest-Finnmark
- Municipality: Nordkapp Municipality
- Established as
- Town (By): 1996

Area
  - Total: 1.04 km^{2} (0.40 sq mi)
- Elevation: 12 m (39 ft)

Population (2023)
  - Total: 2,245
  - Density: 2,159/km^{2} (5,590/sq mi)
- Demonym: Honningsvåging
- Time zone: UTC+01:00 (CET)
  - Summer (DST): UTC+02:00 (CEST)
- Post Code: 9750 Honningsvåg

Honningsvåg is the northernmost town in mainland Norway. It is located in Nordkapp Municipality in Finnmark county. Honningsvåg was declared a city in 1996, despite its small population. The 1.04-square-kilometre (260-acre) town has a population of 2,245 (2023), which gives it a population density of 2,159 inhabitants per square kilometre (5,590/sq mi).

Honningsvåg is situated at a bay on the southeastern side of the large island of Magerøya, while the famous North Cape and its visitor center are on the northern side of the island. Honningsvåg is a port of call for Hurtigruten Coastal Express and cruise ships, especially in the summer months. The ice-free ocean (the southwestern part of the Barents Sea) provides rich fisheries and tourism is also important to the town. Even at 71°N, many private gardens in Honningsvåg have trees, although rarely more than 3 to 4 metres (9.8 to 13.1 ft) tall.

The famous dog Bamse that became the mascot of the Free Norwegian Forces during the Second World War came from Honningsvåg.

== Port and transportation ==
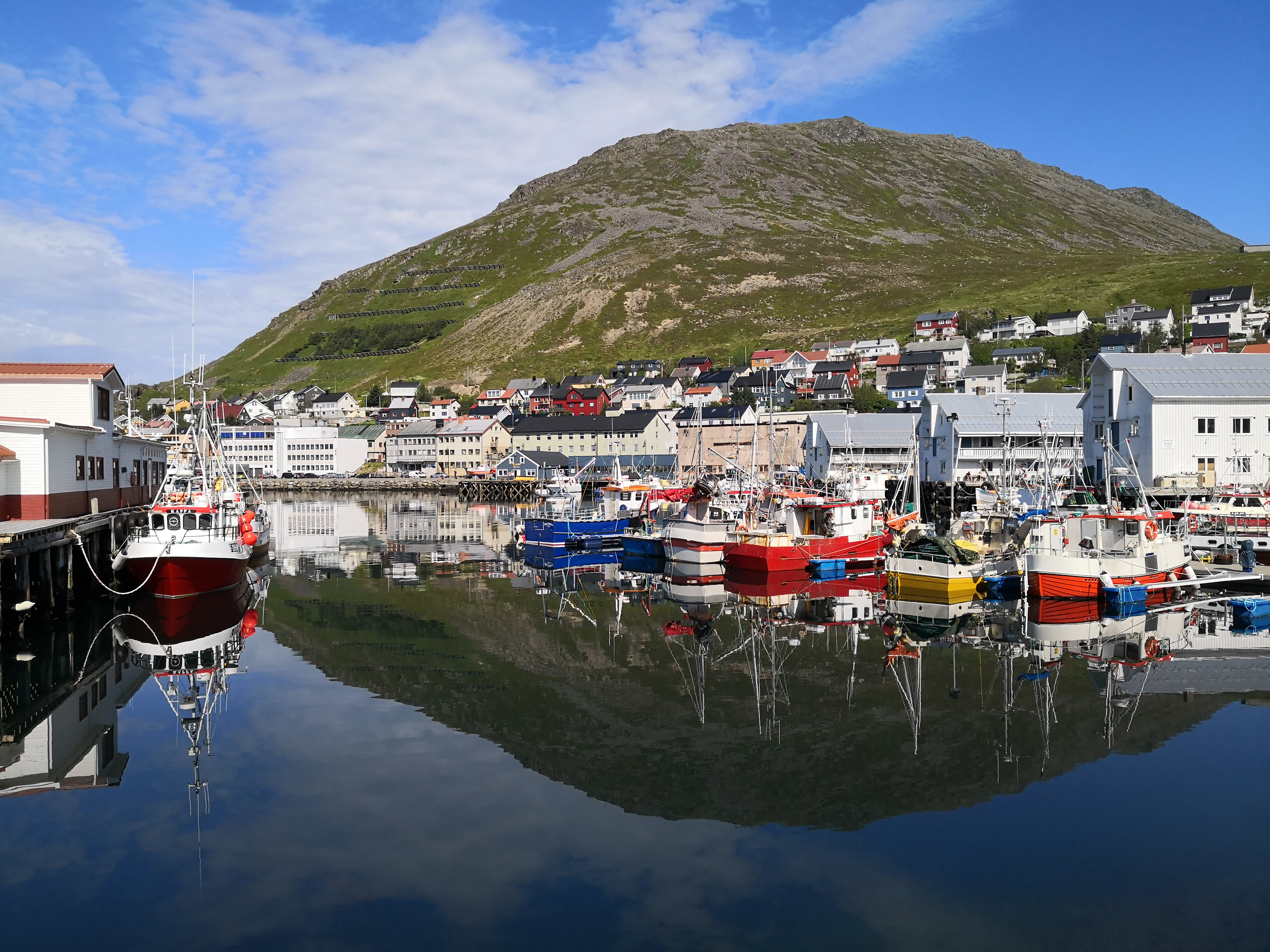
Honningsvåg harbor

The port of Honningsvåg is an important stop-over for the ships of the nordic gas and oil industry. After the 2022 Russian invasion of Ukraine Norway imposed restrictions on Russian LNG projects, but vessels carrying the super chilled gas remain permitted to use services at the Honningsvåg port, including provisioning and crew changes.

Honningsvåg is one of the main stops of the Hurtigruten coastal ships on their lengthy route along the Norwegian coast between Kirkenes in the north and Bergen in the south. The northbound ships to Kirkenes dock in the port generating heavy tourist activity in the city. The southbound ships to Bergen make a short stop as well.

The Honningsvåg Airport, located 4 kilometres (2.5 mi) north of the town, offer flights mainly to Tromsø, with connecting service to Oslo.

Bus line 110 links to Alta.

== History ==
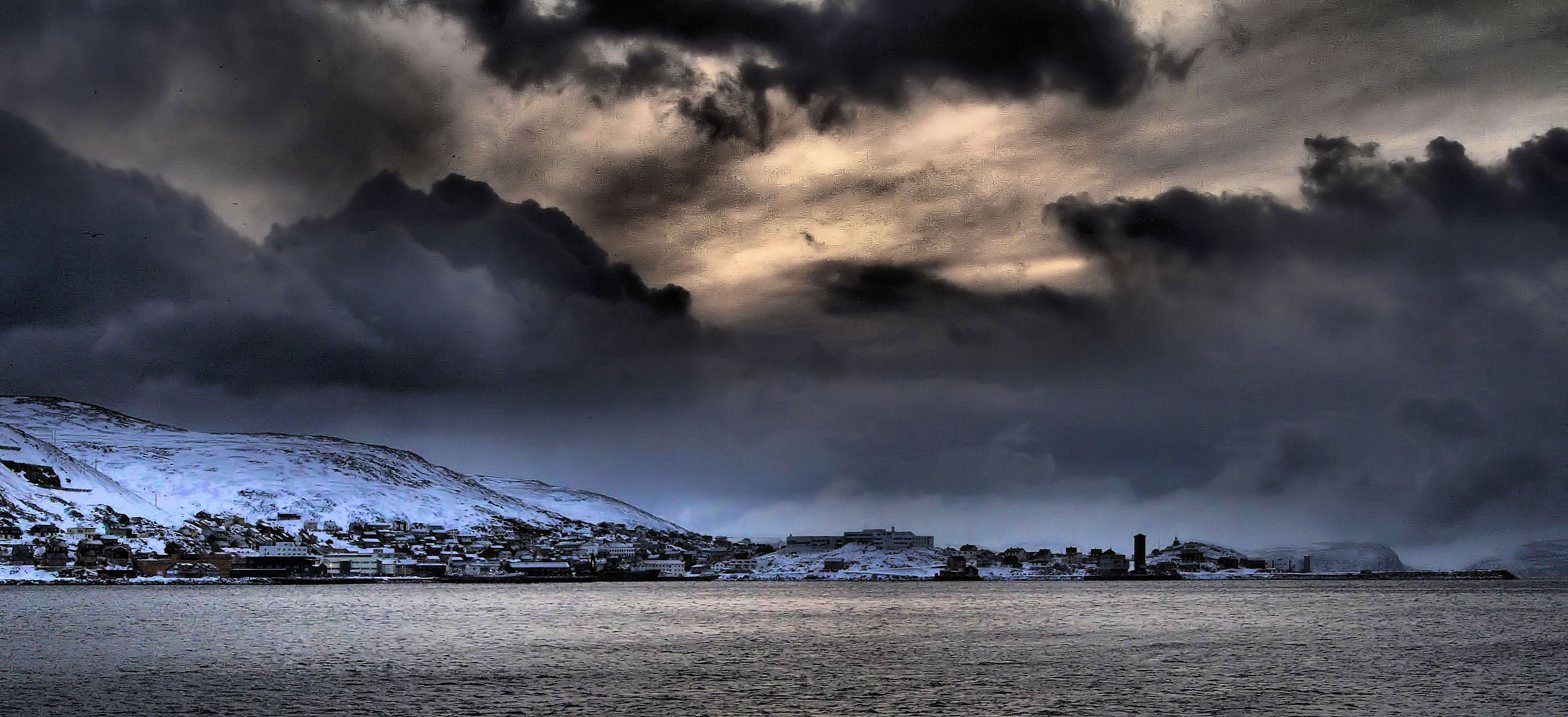
Winter sky in Honningsvåg

The area was first settled in prehistory, as early as 10,300 years ago. The sea was probably the main food source.

=== City status ===
Honningsvåg was declared a city in 1996 by the municipal council of Nordkapp. National legislation was passed in 1997 that states that a Norwegian city must have at least 5,000 inhabitants, but since Honningsvåg was declared a city in 1996, it was exempt from this legislation. This makes it one of the smallest cities in Norway.

=== Name ===
The town (originally it was a village) is named after the old Honningsvaag farm (Old Norse: Hornungsvágr). The meaning of the first element is uncertain. It may be from Hornungr, an old name (no longer used) for the nearby mountain Storefjell (lit. 'big mountain'). This mountain has a tall, hornlike peak near Honningsvåg which would imply that the name was derived from the word horn. The last element is vágr which means "inlet" or "bay". The full name thus means "the bay lying beneath the mountain Hornungr."

== Climate ==
Even though Honningsvåg is located at the northernmost extreme of Europe, it has a subarctic climate (not a polar climate; barely qualifying for Dfc when the isotherm of -3 C (27 F) is used), thanks to the North Atlantic Drift. Winter temperatures are softened by the ice-free ocean, and are extremely mild for the polar latitude, even milder than winters at Oslo Airport which is located 1,400 kilometres (870 mi) and 11 degrees of latitude further south. Located on the coast, Honningsvåg can experience strong winter storms and blizzard conditions, sometimes closing the road connection. On 29 December 2008, winds were recorded at 81 mph. Snow cover can be deep in winter, threatening avalanches in steep terrain. Precipitation is evenly spread throughout the year, but with a little peak in autumn. Honningsvåg has a polar day with midnight sun from 13 May to 31 July. From 21 November to 21 January, the sun is below the horizon (polar night). On 29 June 2022 a new record high was set with 28.4 °C (83.1 °F).

Climate data for Nordkapp, (Note: Temperature, humidity, and dew point from Honningsvåg Airport (14m), precipitation and extreme snow depth from Repvåg.) 1991–2020 normals, extremes 2002–present
Month	Jan	Feb	Mar	Apr	May	Jun	Jul	Aug	Sep	Oct	Nov	Dec	Year
Record high °C (°F)	6.8 (44.2)	9.5 (49.1)	9.8 (49.6)	12.5 (54.5)	20.1 (68.2)	28.4 (83.1)	27.1 (80.8)	28 (82)	21 (70)	13.3 (55.9)	10.7 (51.3)	8.6 (47.5)	28.4 (83.1)
Mean maximum °C (°F)	4.9 (40.8)	4.9 (40.8)	4.9 (40.8)	7.8 (46.0)	13.7 (56.7)	17.7 (63.9)	22.6 (72.7)	20.2 (68.4)	15.7 (60.3)	10.5 (50.9)	7.1 (44.8)	6.2 (43.2)	22.9 (73.2)
Mean daily maximum °C (°F)	−0.5 (31.1)	−1.0 (30.2)	0.4 (32.7)	3.0 (37.4)	6.8 (44.2)	9.6 (49.3)	13.4 (56.1)	12.7 (54.9)	10.2 (50.4)	5.6 (42.1)	2.8 (37.0)	1.4 (34.5)	5.4 (41.7)
Daily mean °C (°F)	−2.5 (27.5)	−3.3 (26.1)	−1.7 (28.9)	0.7 (33.3)	4.2 (39.6)	6.9 (44.4)	10.2 (50.4)	10.2 (50.4)	8.0 (46.4)	3.8 (38.8)	0.7 (33.3)	−0.8 (30.6)	3.0 (37.4)
Mean daily minimum °C (°F)	−4.8 (23.4)	−5.2 (22.6)	−3.4 (25.9)	−0.9 (30.4)	2.6 (36.7)	5.5 (41.9)	8.6 (47.5)	8.6 (47.5)	6.5 (43.7)	2.3 (36.1)	−0.9 (30.4)	−2.7 (27.1)	1.3 (34.3)
Mean minimum °C (°F)	−10.7 (12.7)	−10.6 (12.9)	−8.5 (16.7)	−6.0 (21.2)	−1.5 (29.3)	1.5 (34.7)	5.3 (41.5)	5.0 (41.0)	2.6 (36.7)	−2.8 (27.0)	−5.6 (21.9)	−8.3 (17.1)	−12.5 (9.5)
Record low °C (°F)	−15.3 (4.5)	−17.2 (1.0)	−11.0 (12.2)	−10.0 (14.0)	−5.7 (21.7)	0.0 (32.0)	0.0 (32.0)	1.0 (33.8)	0.0 (32.0)	−5.6 (21.9)	−11.3 (11.7)	−21.2 (−6.2)	−21.2 (−6.2)
Average precipitation mm (inches)	55 (2.2)	39 (1.5)	51 (2.0)	36 (1.4)	42 (1.7)	46 (1.8)	48 (1.9)	52 (2.0)	64 (2.5)	78 (3.1)	50 (2.0)	63 (2.5)	627 (24.7)
Average extreme snow depth cm (inches)	61 (24)	60 (24)	59 (23)	64 (25)	32 (13)	0 (0)	0 (0)	0 (0)	1 (0.4)	31 (12)	31 (12)	32 (13)	75 (30)
Average precipitation days (≥ 1.0 mm)	9	7	10	8	7	7	7	6	7	10	7	8	94
Average relative humidity (%)	78	78	76	75	72	77	79	79	78	79	79	78	77
Average dew point °C (°F)	−6.0 (21.2)	−6.6 (20.1)	−5.4 (22.3)	−2.9 (26.8)	0.2 (32.4)	3.5 (38.3)	7.1 (44.8)	6.8 (44.2)	4.9 (40.8)	0.7 (33.3)	−2.2 (28.0)	−3.9 (25.0)	−0.3 (31.5)
Source 1: Norwegian Meteorological Institute
Source 2: yr.no /Norwegian Meteorological Institute

== Media gallery ==
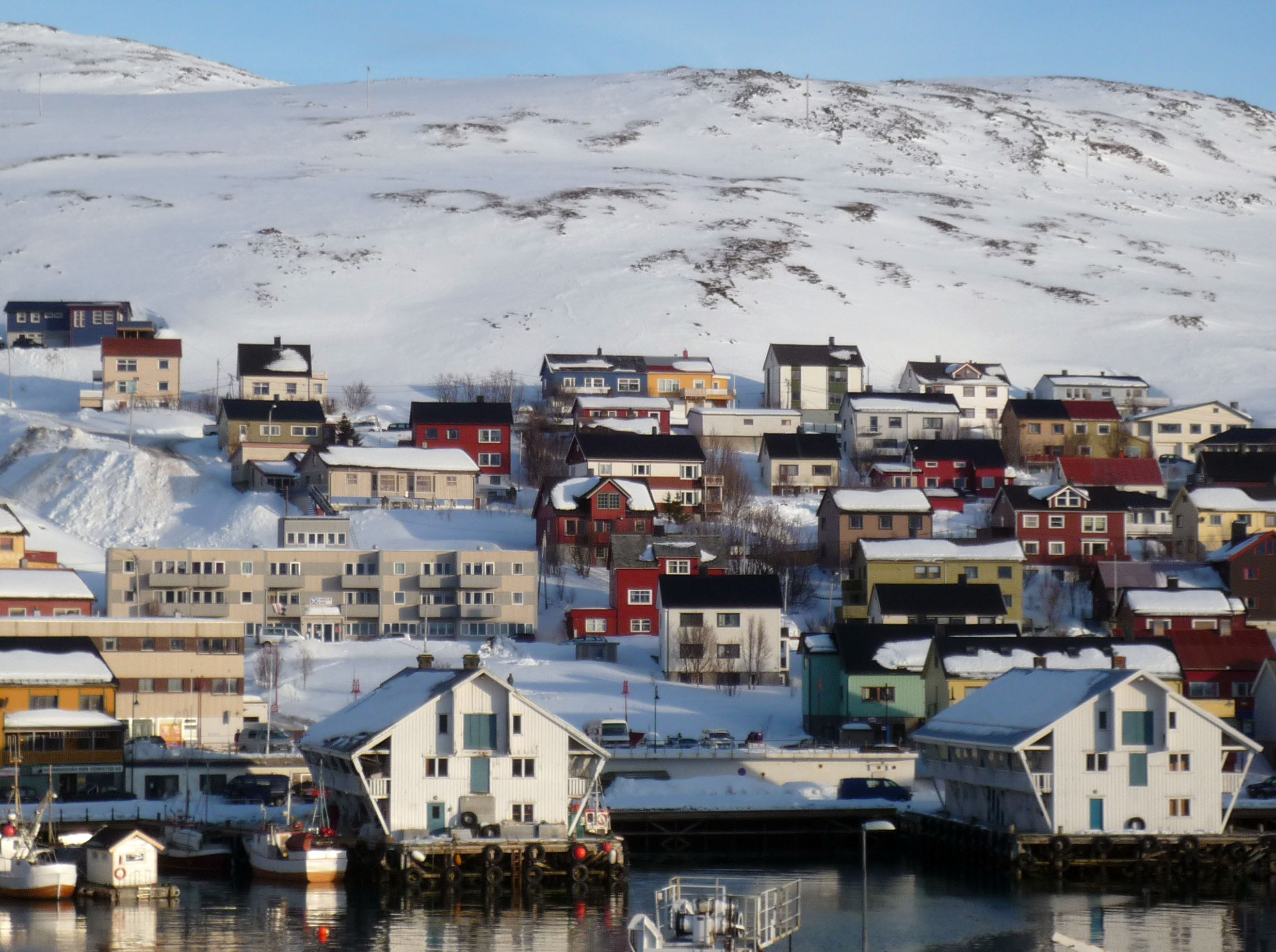

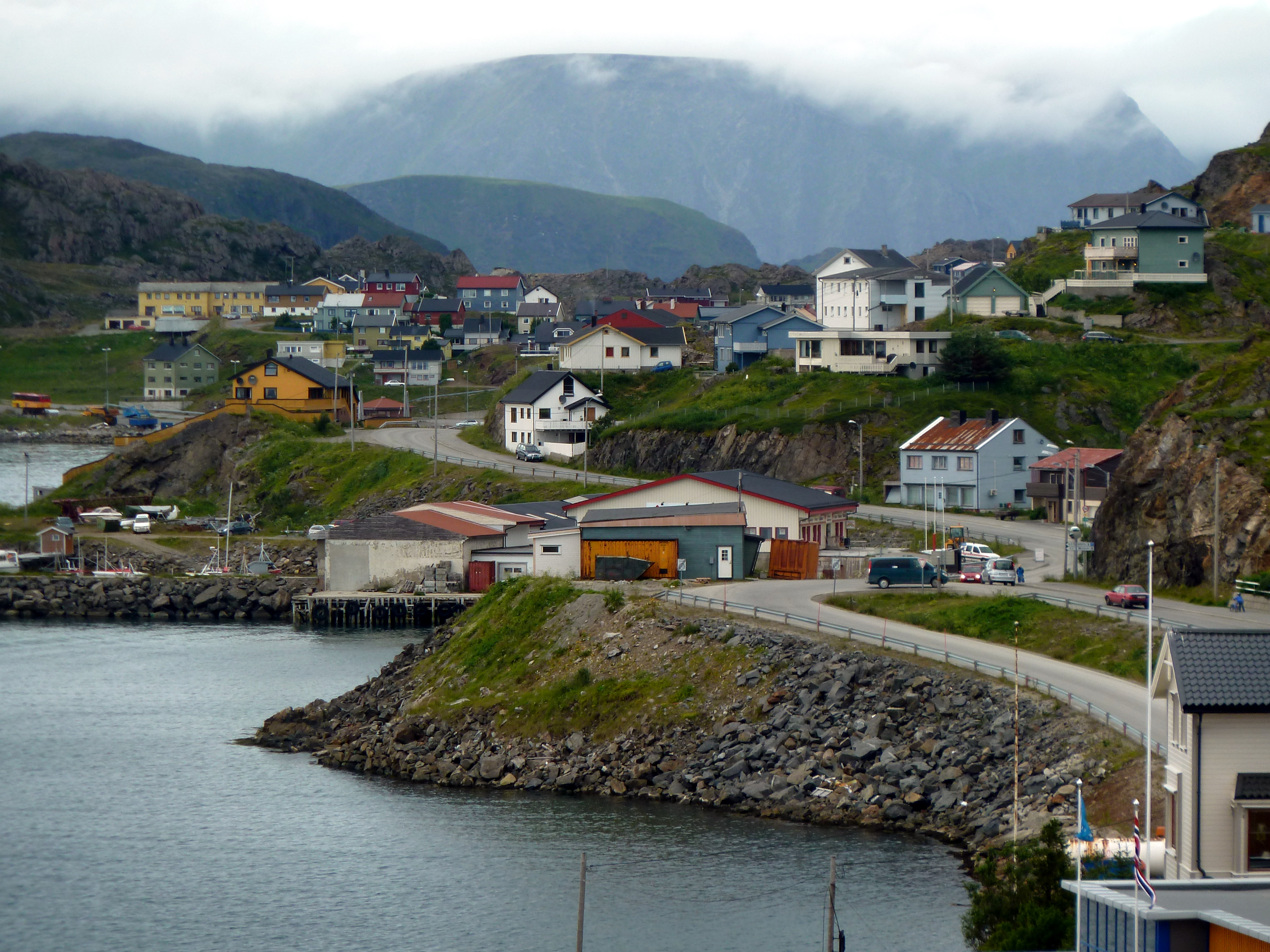

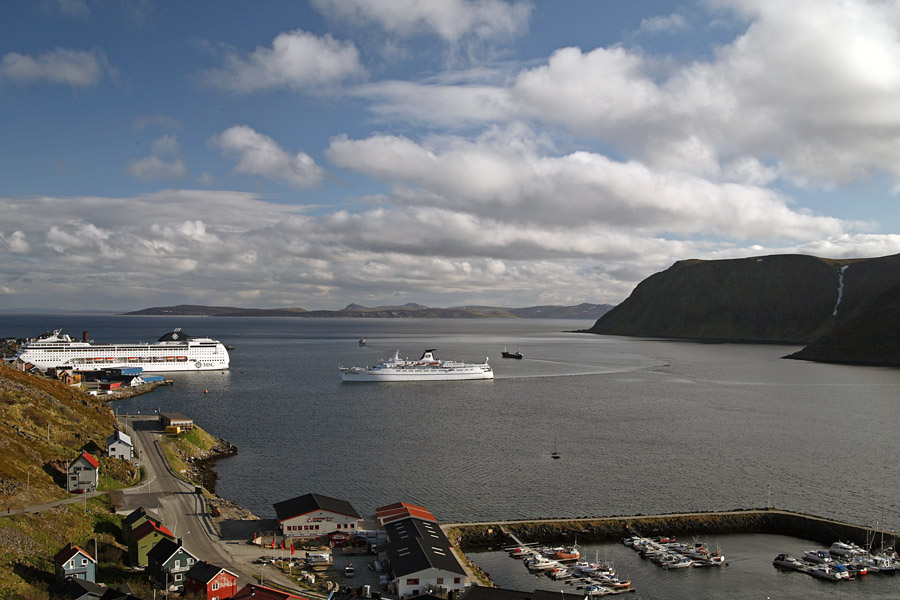

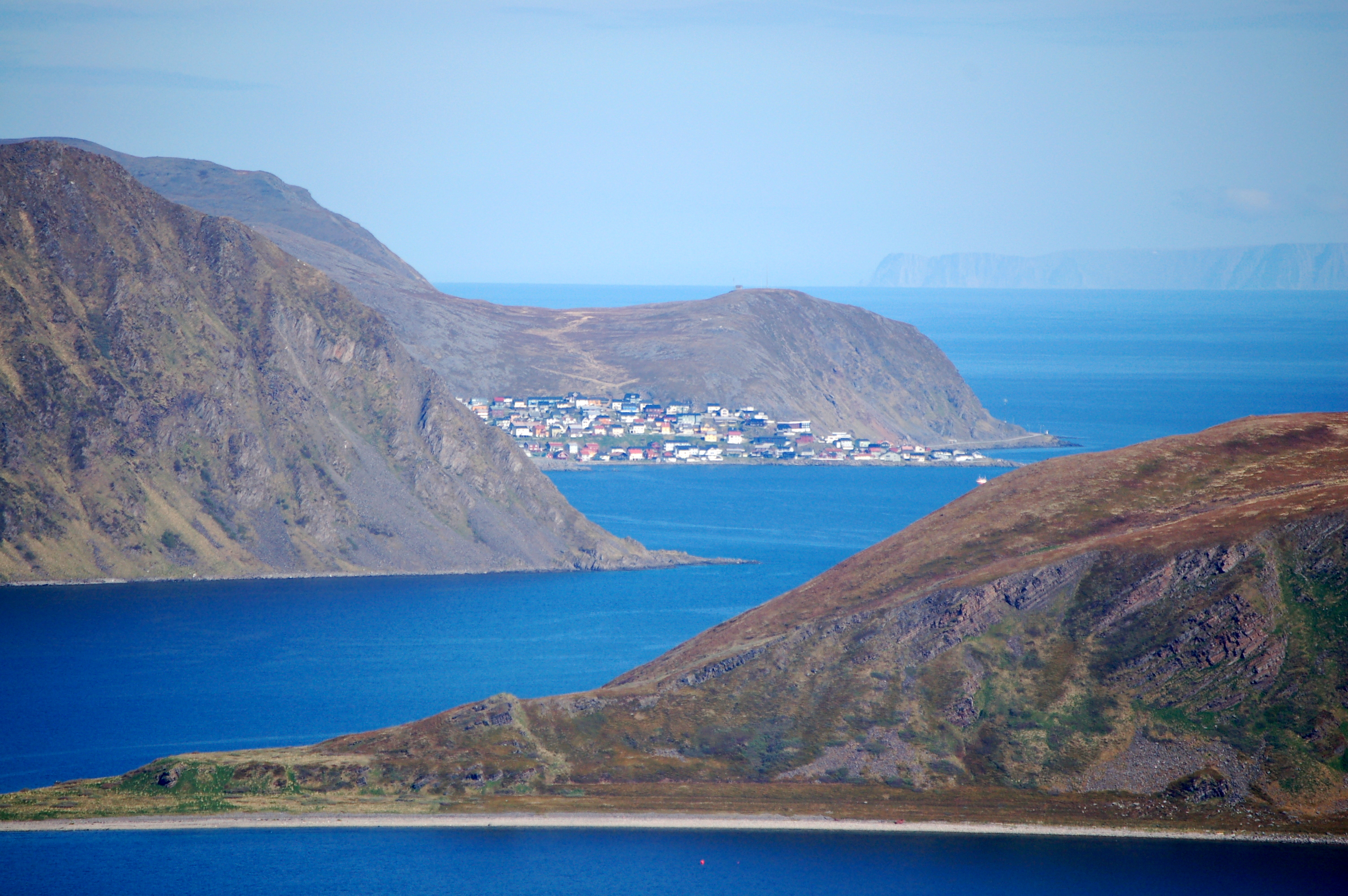

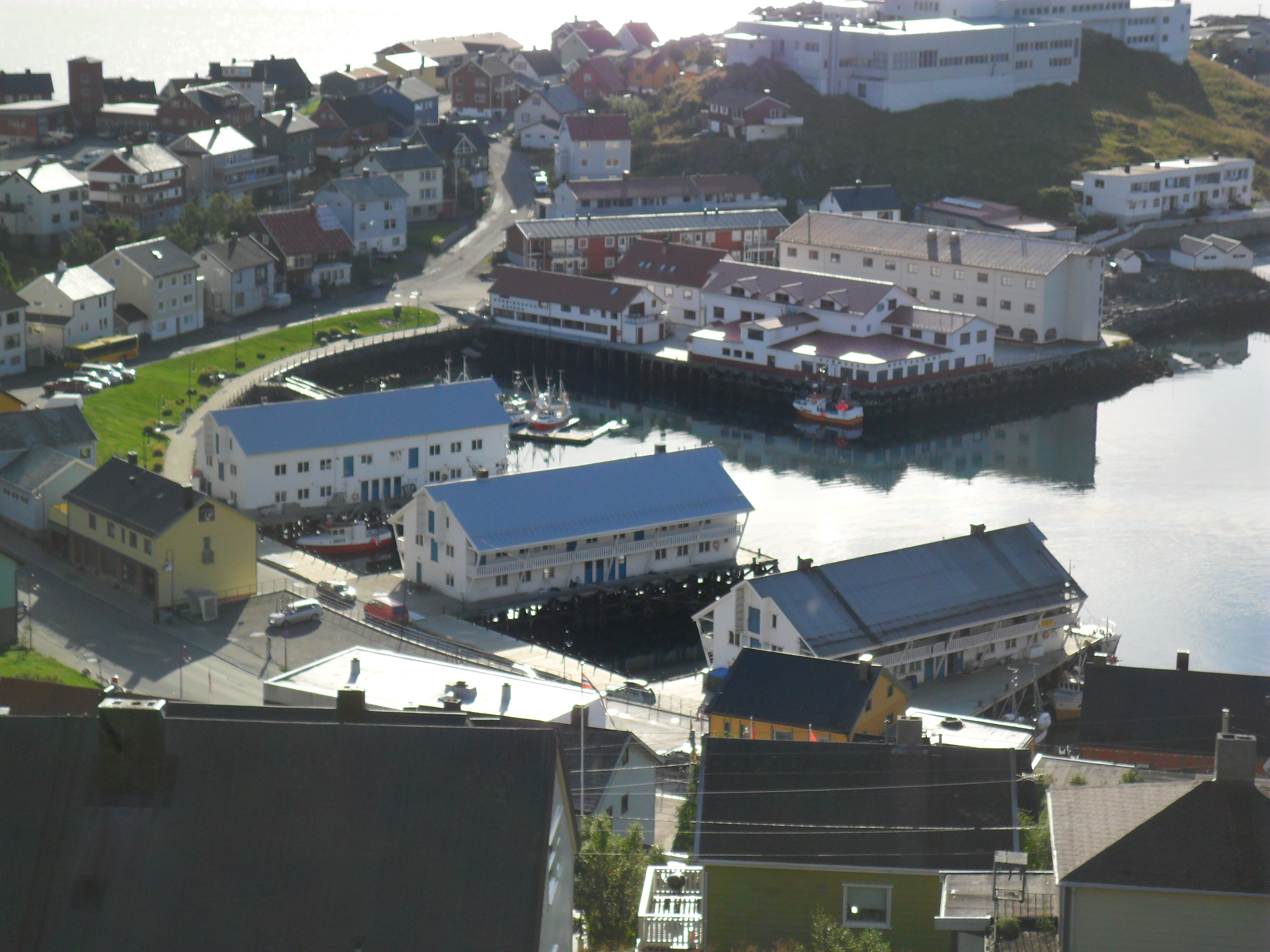

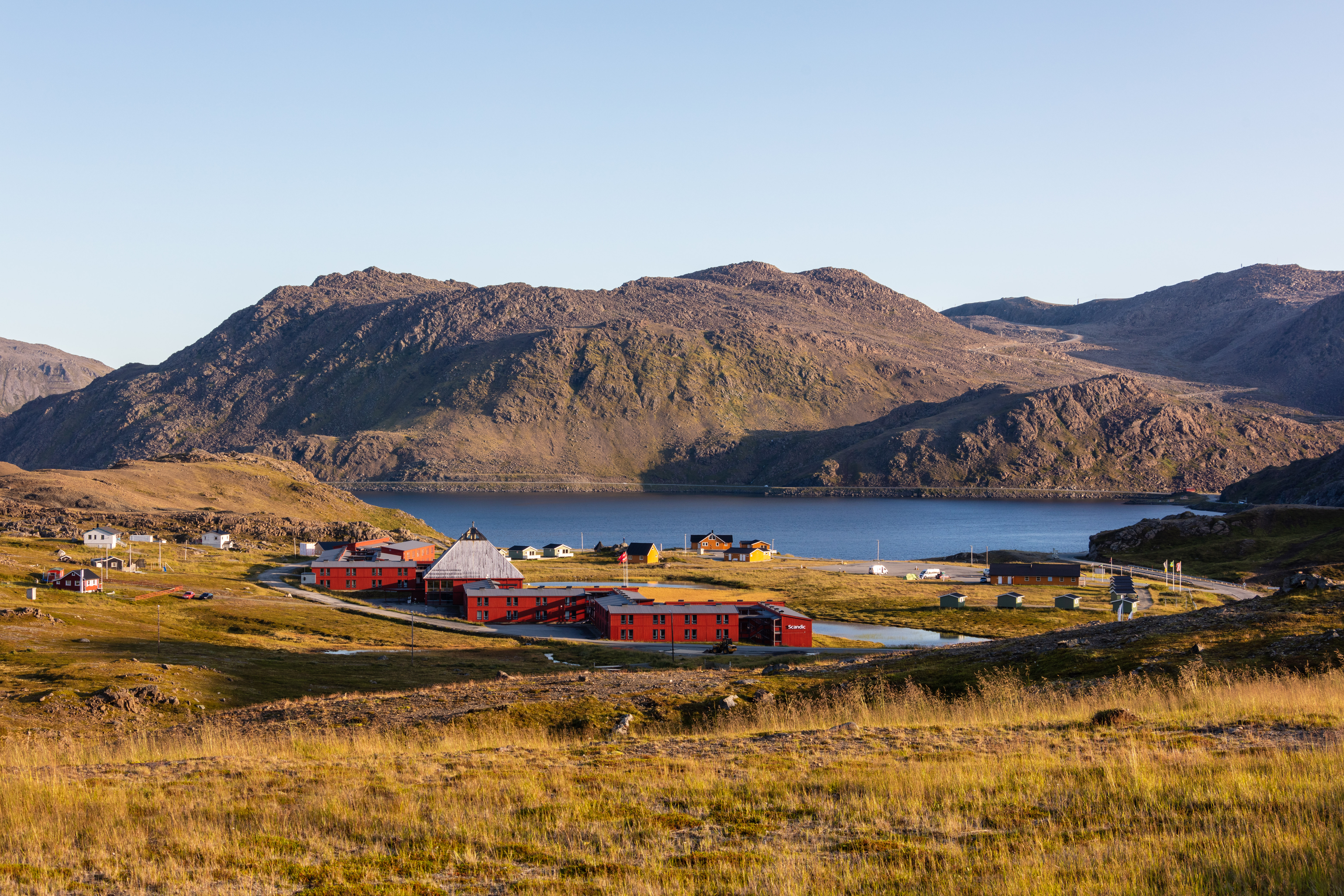

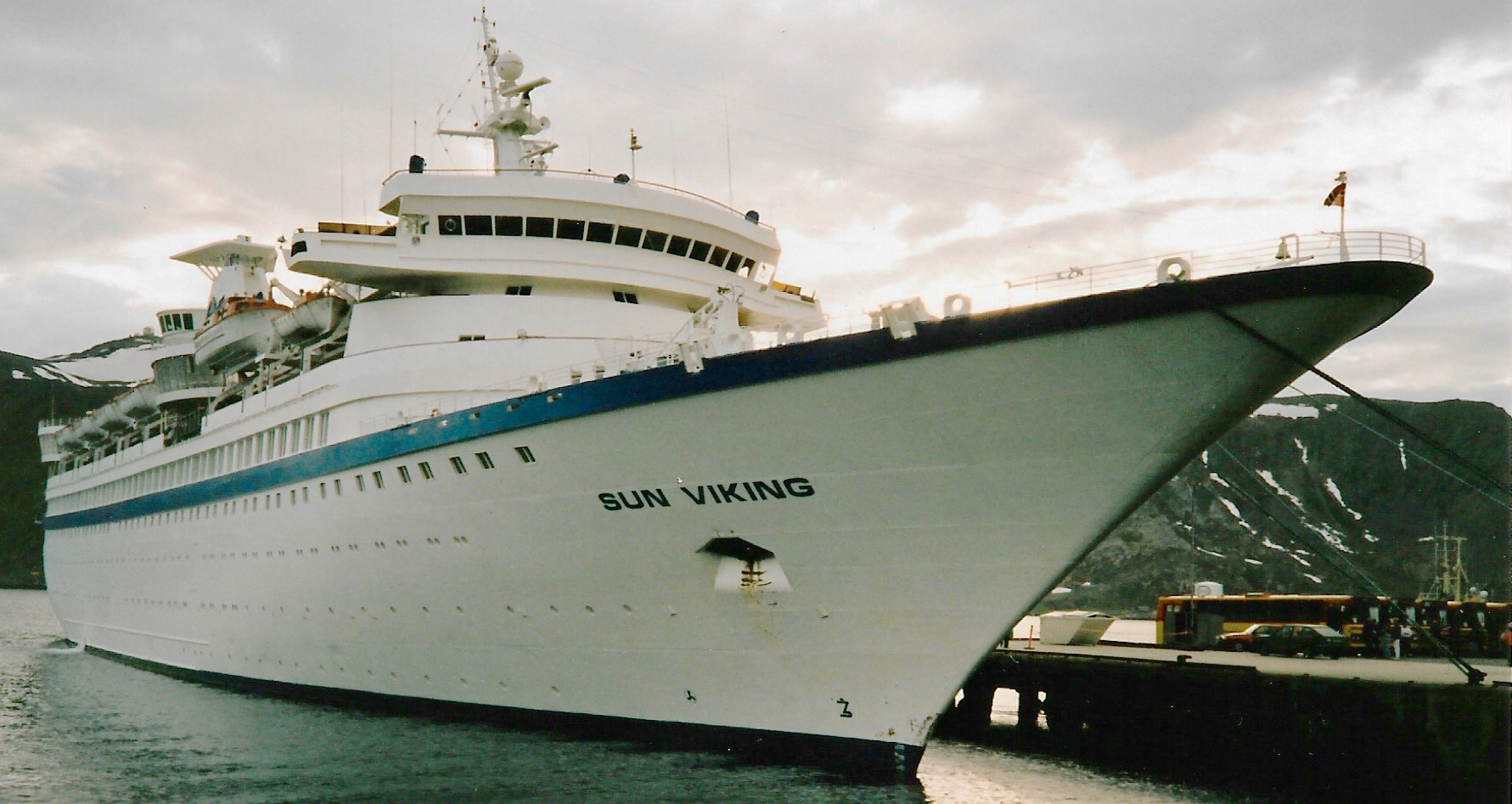
Sun Viking at Honningsvåg in 1993

== See also ==
- List of towns and cities in Norway
- Nordkapp
- Knivskjellodden: the northernmost point of Norway proper (excluding Svalbard, Jan Mayen, and Bear Island)
