= St Michael & All Angels, Nether Wasdale =

Anglican parish church in Cumbria

Coordinates: 54.4245°N 3.3508°W

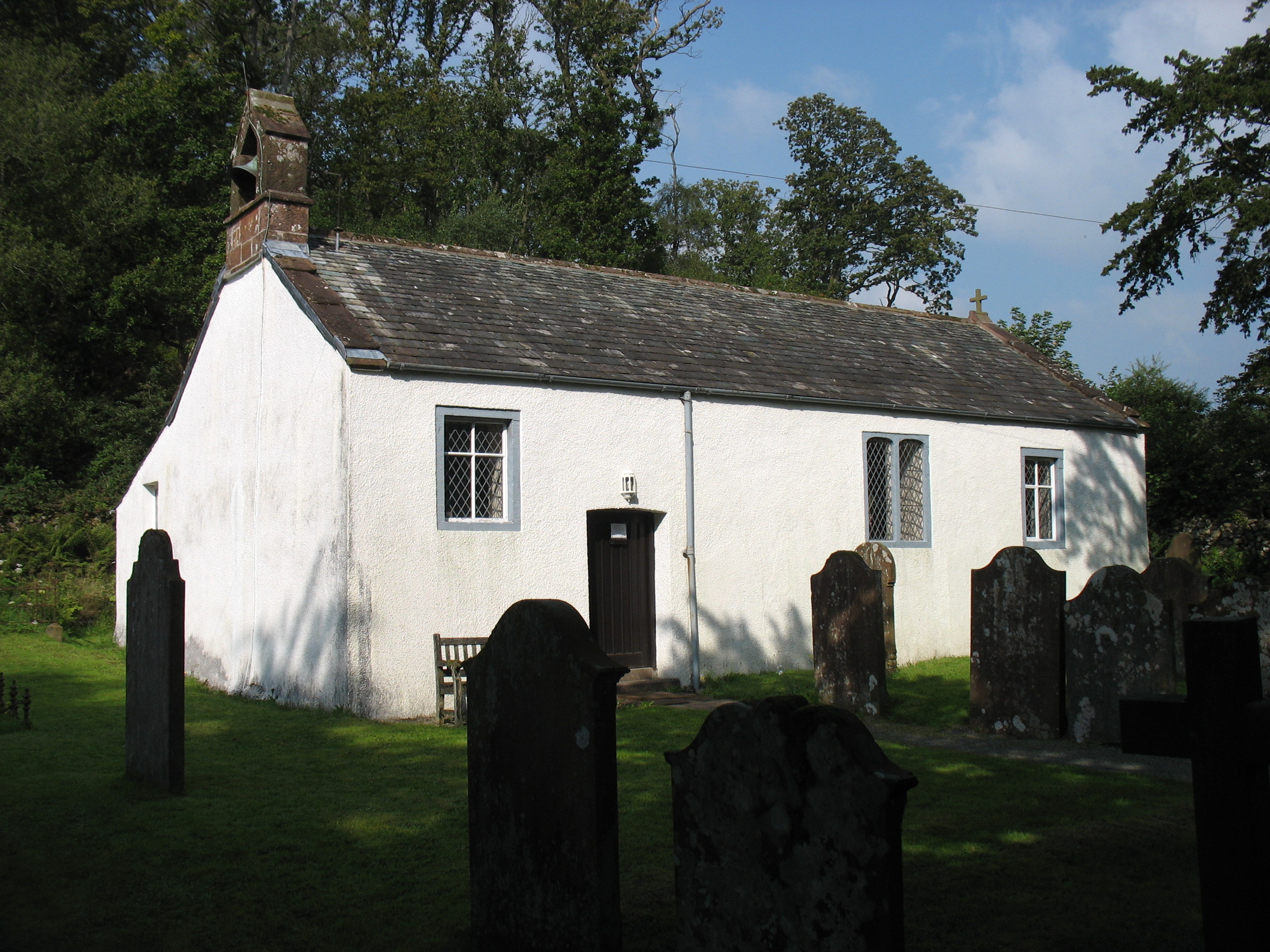
- St Michael & All Angels, Nether Wasdale

- Location in Cumbria
- OS grid reference: NY1245204078
- Location: Nether Wasdale, Cumbria
- Country: England
- Denomination: Anglican

History
- Status: Parish church
- Dedication: St Michael

Administration
- Province: York
- Diocese: Carlisle
- Archdeaconry: West Cumberland
- Deanery: Calder
- Parish: Nether Wasdale

Clergy
- Vicar: J. Riley

St Michael & All Angels' Church in Nether Wasdale, Cumbria, England, is an active Anglican parish church in the deanery of Calder, and the diocese of Carlisle. Its benefice is Gosforth and Wasdale. The church is a Grade II* listed building.

== History ==
St Michael's church was originally a chapel of ease for St Bees Priory. The present church was built and consecrated in 1535. The north aisle and vestry were added in 1830 by Stansfield Rawson, who also donated the oak panelling in the sanctuary, with borders of cherubs, fruit and flowers, and the pulpit and lectern were salvaged from York Minster after a fire in the 19th century.

== Architecture ==
The church is built of the local stone covered with white render, with a slate roof and bellcote with one bell. The interior space consists of a nave and chancel.

The east window, by Shrigley and Hunt, depicts the Resurrection Morning, and is a memorial to the men of the parish who gave their lives in the Great War 1914–1918. The rest of the windows are opaque.

On the west wall is a moulded Royal coat-of-arms of George III. Gas lamps, now with electric bulbs, hang along the aisle and the south wall. The pews are of dark wood and fixed.

The churchyard has approximately 20 grave stones, with no war graves.
