= HNoMS Thorodd =

History

France
- Name: Fleurus
- Builder: Foundation Company of Savannah, Georgia
- In service: 1919
- Out of service: September 1924

Norway
- Name: Fleurus
- Acquired: September 1924
- Renamed: Thorodd (1935)
- Reinstated: August 1945
- Fate: Sank in a storm on 6 October 1955

Norway
- Commissioned: 1939
- Out of service: September 1944

Service record
- Operations: Norwegian Campaign

General characteristics
- Tonnage: 406 gross register tons
- Length: 140.1 ft (42.70 m)
- Beam: 25.1 ft (7.65 m)
- Draft: 13 ft (3.96 m)
- Propulsion: As built: Triple expansion steam engine; Post-Second World War: 600 bhp motor engine

HNoMS Thorodd was a Royal Norwegian Navy patrol ship and minesweeper that served through the Second World War, first during the Norwegian Campaign that followed the invasion of Norway in 1940, and then from exile in the United Kingdom following the 10 June 1940 capitulation of mainland Norway. Thorodd was originally built as a steam escort trawler for the French Navy under the name Fleurus, before being sold to a Norwegian whaling firm who leased her to the Falkland Islands Government. SS Fleurus served as a commercial mail ship in the Falkland Islands Dependencies during the 1920s, and was the first vessel to carry paying tourists to Antarctica. Following the war, Thorodd was converted to a fishing trawler and sank in 1955.

== Construction and early service ==
Fleurus was constructed by the Foundation Company of Savannah, Georgia as a steam escort trawler for the French Navy. She was delivered in 1919, after the end of the First World War, and remained in French service for only three years before being sold to Huret Sauvetage ("Huret Rescue") in Boulogne. In September 1924, she was again sold, this time to the Antarctic whaling firm A/S Tønsberg Hvalfangeri, based in Tønsberg, southern Norway.

As built, Fleurus measured 406 gross register tons, with a steel hull and a triple-expansion steam engine. She was 140.1 feet LPP by 25.1 feet, with a draft of 13 feet.

== Falkland Islands Dependencies ==
Fleurus was converted to carry mail and passengers, and then leased to the Falkland Islands Government, which used her as a mail ship in the Falkland Islands Dependencies, a scattered collection of Antarctic and sub-Antarctic islands. The Fleurus service included five voyages per year between Stanley and the whaling stations at Grytviken on South Georgia, and less frequent journeys to the South Orkney Islands and the South Shetland Islands, the bases for small groups of whalers and sealers. In addition, she carried mail and passengers from Stanley to Montevideo, Uruguay.

In 1927, Fleurus carried Arnold Hodson, Governor of the Falkland Islands, to South Georgia, where the governor inspected the whaling stations and the Discovery Investigations. This was the first time a Governor had visited the Dependencies. The following year, Fleurus took Hodson on a month-long tour further south, visiting the Palmer Archipelago of Graham Land in Antarctica proper, as well as the South Shetlands and South Orkneys. Such trips were not limited to dignitaries; Fleurus operated a commercial passenger service on the mail route, and advertised round-trip "tourist tickets" for the journeys to South Georgia and the South Shetlands, the first tourist cruises in Antarctica.

In addition to her regular government duties, it was briefly suggested in 1928 that she be used to patrol territorial waters and prevent unlicensed whaling, but the political problems arising from a Norwegian whaling company's ship carrying out British license enforcement rendered this impractical. Fleurus was also contracted to support the Wilkins-Hearst Antarctic expedition in 1928–9.

== Royal Norwegian Navy ==
In 1933, Fleurus was sold to Einar Veim in Bergen, and in 1935 sold to A/S Thorodd in Ålesund, when she was renamed Thorodd. She was hired by the Royal Norwegian Navy following the outbreak of the Second World War, and taken into service as a patrol ship based at Hammerfest in the far north of Norway.

Following the Norwegian Campaign of April–June 1940, the surviving ships of the Royal Norwegian Navy were evacuated to the United Kingdom. Thorodd arrived on 17 June, and at the end of the month was sent to Rosyth Dockyard to be converted for use as a minesweeper. She was taken into the Royal Navy on 14 March 1941, manned by a Norwegian crew, as HMS Thorodd (FY-1905), operating with a group of North Sea minesweepers based in Dundee. She served for the next three and a half years, finally being taken out of service in September 1944 and laid up.

While serving as a minesweeper, Thorodd gained a measure of fame for her captain's dog, a St. Bernard named Bamse. Bamse was widely known among the local communities around the shore bases in Montrose and Dundee, and had the run of the town; he eventually became famous as a mascot of the Royal Norwegian Navy and of the Norwegian Forces in Exile.

== Postwar ==
In August 1945, at the end of the war, Thorodd was formally returned to A/S Thorodd. She was later converted to a 600 b.h.p. engine before being laid up in Ålesund in 1951. The following year, she was sold to the fisheries company A/S Grindhaugs Fiskeriselskap, which converted her to a seine trawler; after conversion, she was lengthened to 151.2 feet, with a tonnage of 452 gross register tons, and a 408 b.h.p. engine, making her the largest seine trawler operating in Norway.

Outside the fishing season, Thorodd transported cargo between ports. She was carrying a cargo of ore from Visnes to Tofte on 6 October 1955 when a storm caused the cargo to shift and she developed a severe list. The crew abandoned ship and Thorodd sank.
