= Easter postcard =

Postcard sent at Easter

Easter postcards are a form of postcard that people send to each other at Easter. They have now mostly changed to e-cards rather than postcards, but their purpose remains the same.

== History ==
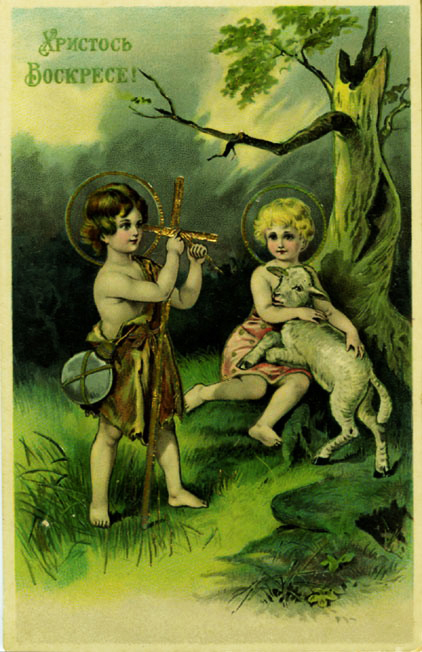
Christ is Risen!, Easter postcard of Russian Empire

The tradition of sending Easter postcards to relatives and friends developed during the end of the 19th century. Although only a few were sent in 1898, the cards subsequently became popular worldwide.

In the beginning, monochrome as well as colored cards were printed. Most of the time, the center of the cards contained an oversized egg. During the first years during which Easter postcards were sent, the front side was empty. This was the space for senders to write their greetings because post offices would only allow the address and the stamp on the back side. Because of that, the artistically precious illustrations were deformed. In 1905, post offices in Austria and Germany separated the back side of the cards into two halves. The right half served as before (for the address and the stamp) and the other half was the new space for the message. In 1906 this was officially allowed by the world-post-congress in Rome.

Circa 1910, the cards were mainly monochrome pictures which were sometimes colored with children in the context with lambs, poultry, and eggs. Young girls were a symbol for luck and hope. The Easter Bunny which was a personified symbol of fruitfulness, was often portrayed with eggs. German publishers were leading in the production of Easter postcards before the First World War.

During the time of the First World War, children were replaced with soldiers and a military appearance of the Easter bunny was common. After the First World War, photos no longer served as the foundation for Easter postcards; instead they featured drawn colorful Easter motives. A very popular motive was Jesus in the open countryside surrounded by sheep. Cards with flowers were also common. During times of prosperity, the cards were often created using chromolithography. Many very impressive cards still exist with silver, gold and relief-stamping.

The number of Easter postcards declined through the Second World War. Since then, the number of cards sent has declined; especially during the past decade because of the competition with telephony and e-mail.

== Gallery ==
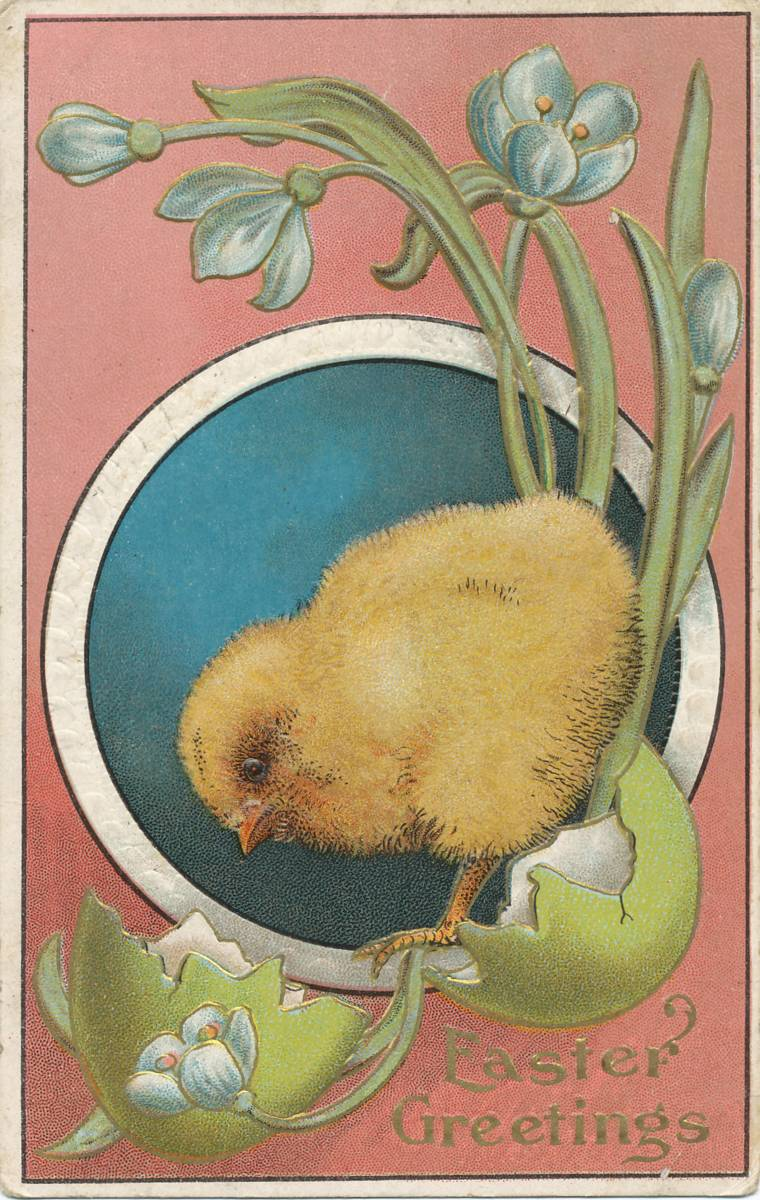
Postcard, c. 1910

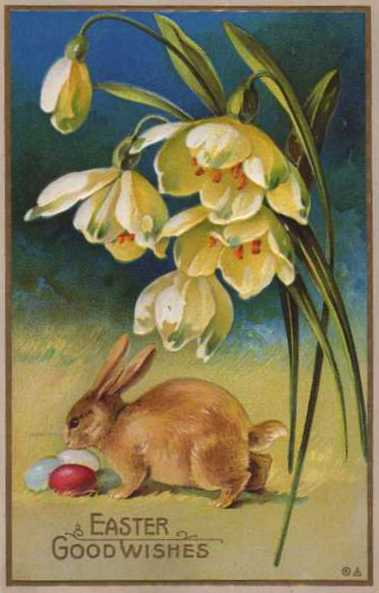
Bunny, eggs, and snowdrops, c. 1910

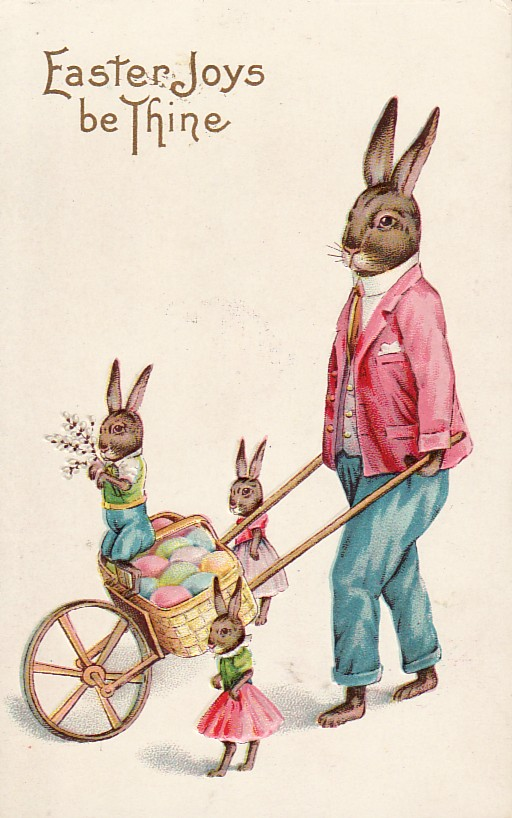
Stecher postcard, c. 1915

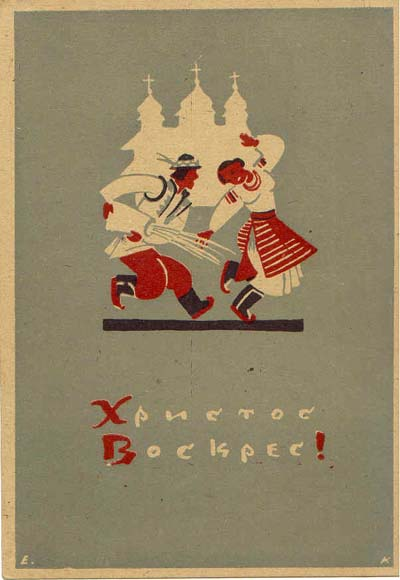
Ukrainian postcard

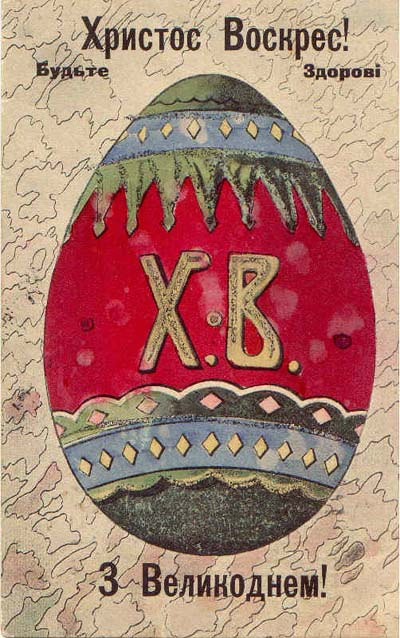
Ukrainian postcard

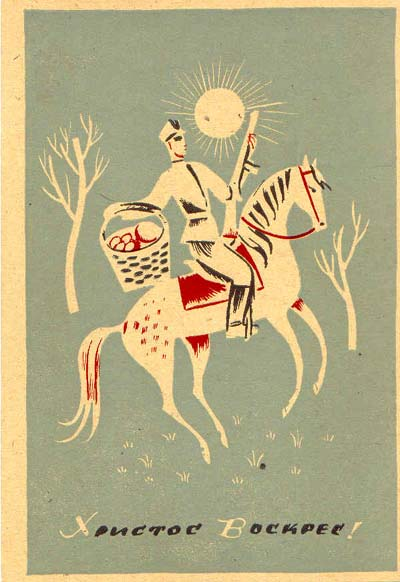
Ukrainian postcard

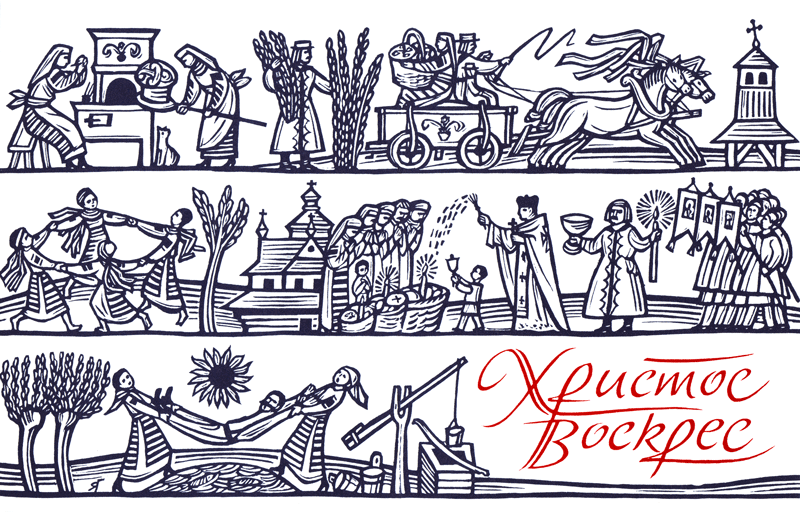
Ukrainian Easter card by Jacques Hnizdovsky
