= Nether Wasdale =

Village in Cumbria, England

Coordinates: 54.424°N 3.351°W

- The centre of Nether Wasdale

- Location in Copeland Borough Location within Cumbria
- OS grid reference: NY123040
- Civil parish: Wasdale
- Unitary authority: Cumberland
- Ceremonial county: Cumbria
- Region: North West
- Country: England
- Sovereign state: United Kingdom
- Post town: SEASCALE
- Postcode district: CA20
- Dialling code: 019467
- Police: Cumbria
- Fire: Cumbria
- Ambulance: North West
- UK Parliament: Whitehaven and Workington

Nether Wasdale is a village in Cumbria, England, located in the valley and civil parish of Wasdale, near the River Irt and just over a mile to the west of the Wastwater lake.

== Notable features ==
The main church in Nether Wasdale is St Michaels and All Angels Church, which was built in the 16th century. The church has a maypole in front of it: now a listed structure, it was built originally to celebrate Queen Victoria's diamond jubilee. The nearby Wastwater is, at 258' deep the deepest of all of the Lake District lakes. Nether Wasdale is served by the ancient Bridle Path "Guards Lonning" that runs from Lane Side east of Gosforth along to Guards Head, between Blengdale Forest and the newly planted Bamse's Wood, across a wooden footbridge at Kid Beck and down between Yew Tree Farm and Windsor Farm into Nether Wasdale.

Nether Wasdale contains the hotels the Screes Inn, the Strands Hotel and Low Wood Hall.

Nether Wasdale was historically a chapelry within the larger ancient parish of St Bees. The chapelry covered a large area stretching north-east from the village along the north-west side of Wastwater. The chapelry of Nether Wasdale became a separate civil parish under the Poor Law Amendment Act 1866. The Wasdale Head area was transferred from the parish of Eskdale and Wasdale to the parish of Nether Wasdale in 1934. The name of the civil parish remained Nether Wasdale until 2000, when it was changed to Wasdale.

== See also ==
- Listed buildings in Wasdale

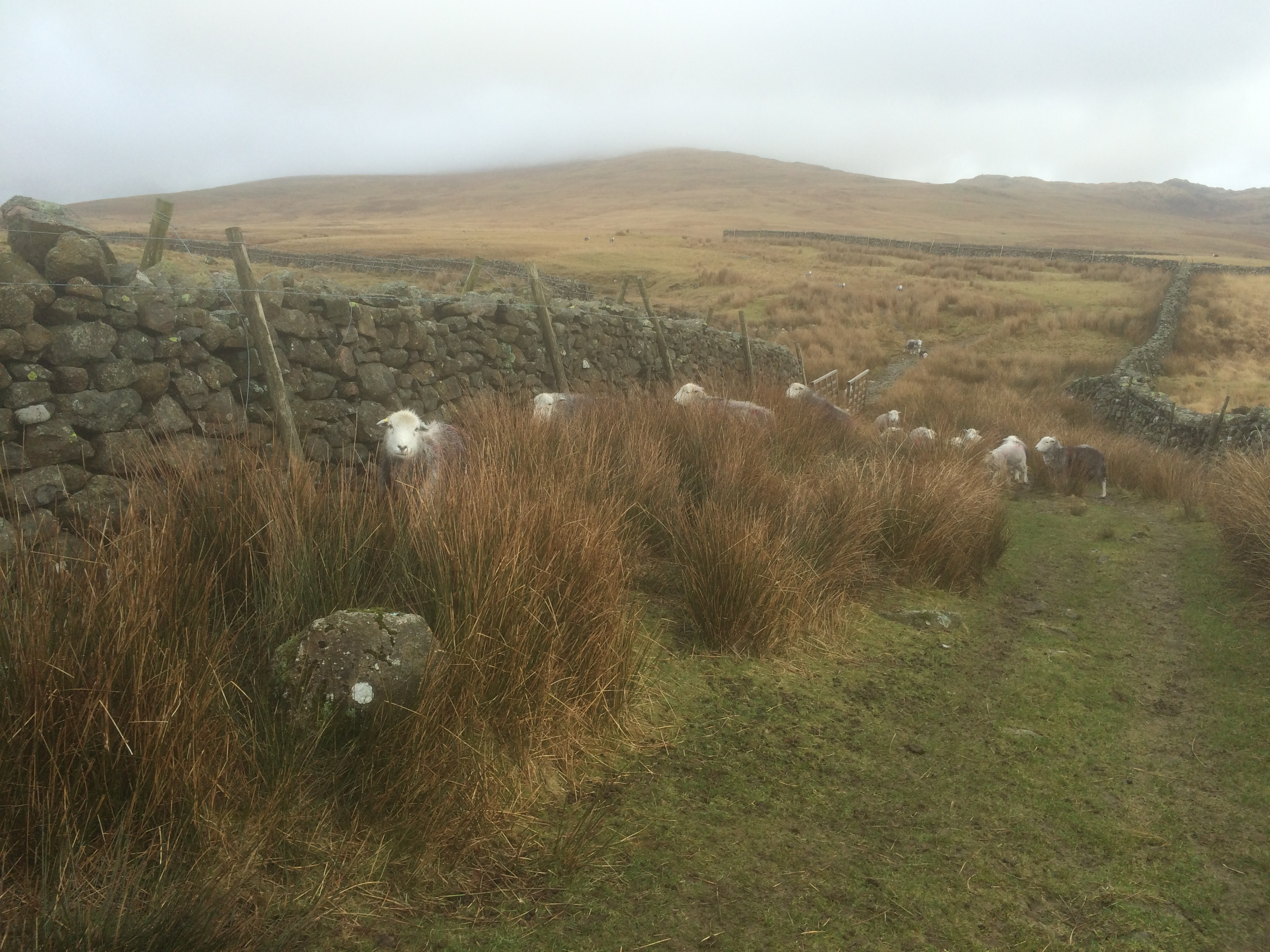
A view along Guards Lonning towards Kid Beck Footbridge
