= Wasdale Head =

Hamlet in Cumbria, England

Coordinates: 54.466°N 3.25°W

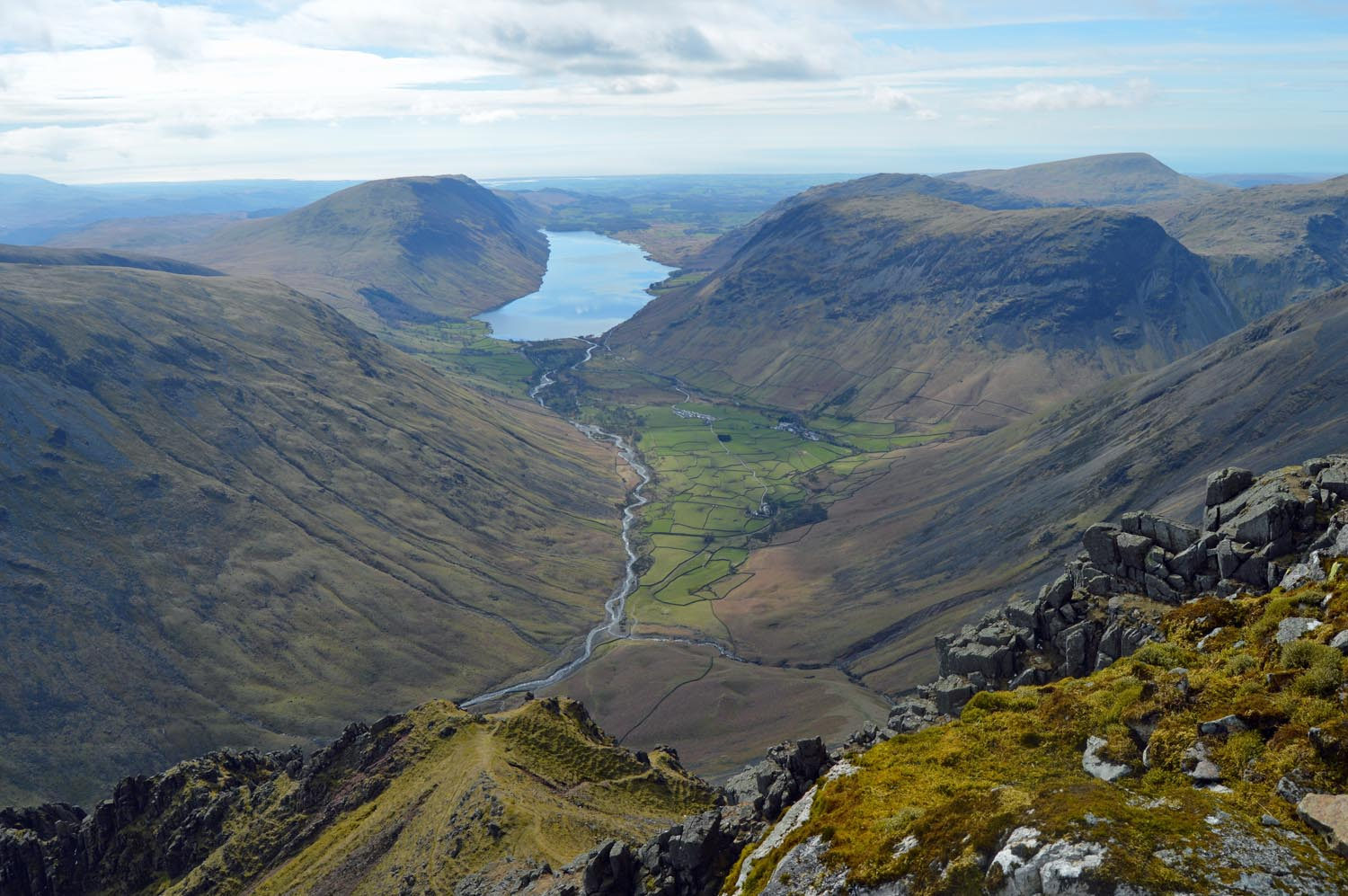
- View of Wasdale Head from the Westmorland cairn on Great Gable

- Location in former Copeland Borough Location within Cumbria
- OS grid reference: NY189085
- Civil parish: Wasdale
- Unitary authority: Cumberland
- Ceremonial county: Cumbria
- Region: North West
- Country: England
- Sovereign state: United Kingdom
- Post town: SEASCALE
- Postcode district: CA20
- Dialling code: 019467
- Police: Cumbria
- Fire: Cumbria
- Ambulance: North West
- UK Parliament: Whitehaven and Workington

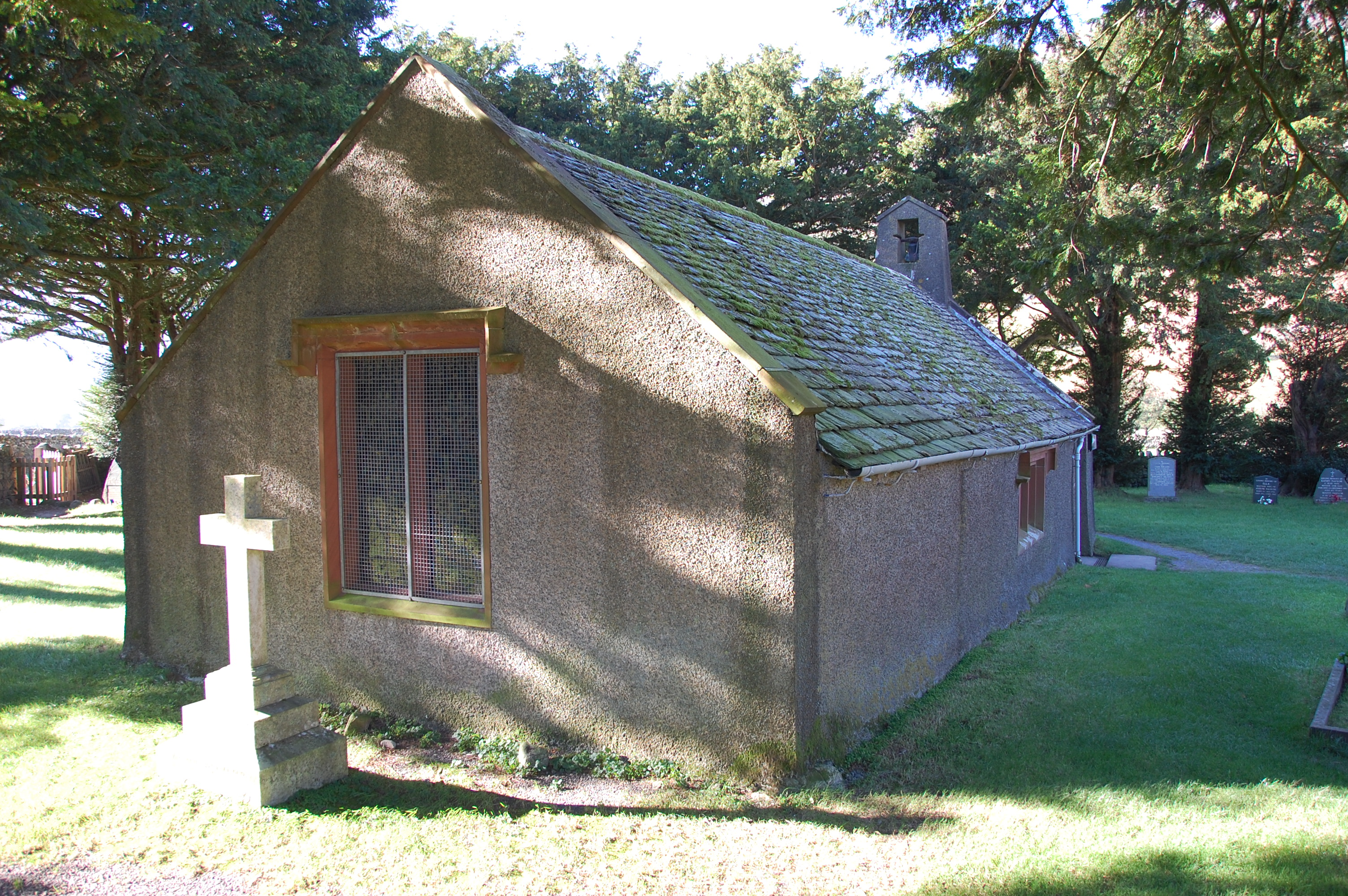
St Olaf's Church, Wasdale Head

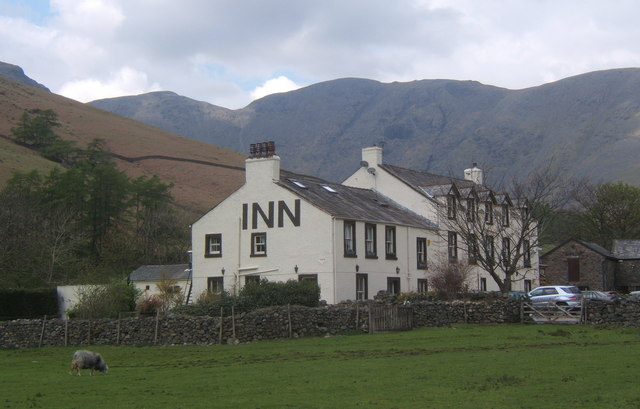
Wasdale Head Inn, famous as the centre of the birth of British rock climbing

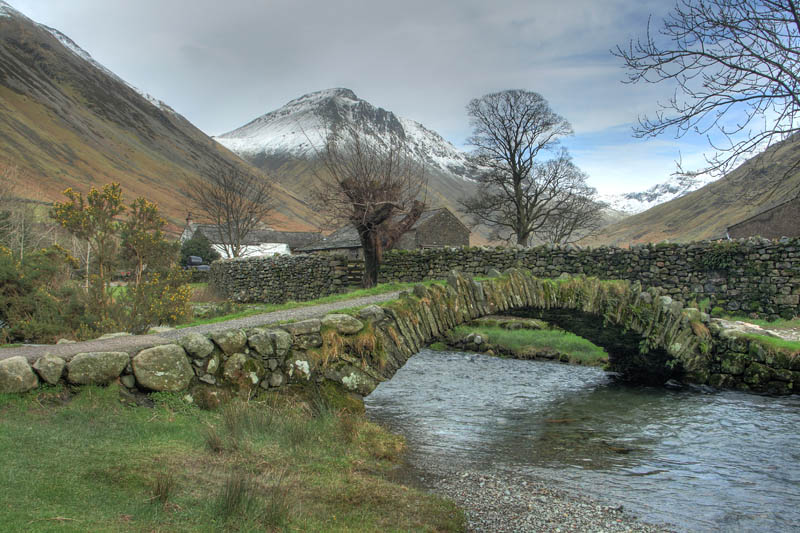
Packhorse bridge behind the Inn

Wasdale Head (/ˈwɒzdeɪl/; traditionally /ˈwɒsəl, ˈwɒʃdəl/) is a scattered agricultural hamlet in the Lake District National Park in Cumbria, England. Wasdale Head claims to be home of the highest mountain (Scafell Pike), deepest lake (Wastwater), smallest church and biggest liar in England. The last of these claims refers to Will Ritson, who paradoxically proclaimed himself as such. In 1870-72 the township/chapelry had a population of 49.

== Topology ==
It is located at the head of the valley of Wasdale, and is surrounded by some of England's highest mountains: Scafell Pike, Sca Fell, Great Gable, Kirk Fell and Pillar.

== Climbing and walking ==
The hamlet was the centre of the early years of British rock climbing. There is a famous climber's hotel here, the Wasdale Head Inn, made popular in the Victorian period by Walter Parry Haskett Smith, Owen Glynne Jones and many other pioneers.

Wasdale Head is a popular starting point for the ascent of Scafell Pike. On summer weekends, crowds of people can be found attempting this steep but straightforward walk. Today, it is the recognised starting point for the ascent of Scafell Pike as part of the National Three Peaks Challenge, a vehicle-supported walk of the highest peaks of England, Scotland and Wales.

== Church ==
In the hamlet is St Olaf's Church, which is claimed as being the smallest church in England.

The church has long been associated with British climbers. The south window has a small pane within it with an etching of Napes Needle on Great Gable, serving as a memorial to members of the Fell & Rock Climbing Club who lost their lives in the First World War.

== Will Ritson ==
Will Ritson (1808–1890) was a landlord of the Wastwater Hotel (now called the Wasdale Head Inn) in Wasdale, and he told grand fables. One, for example, was about a wounded eagle he found near the inn. He kept it in his chicken coop and nursed it back to health. One night the coop was raided by a bitch hound. The eagle was unscathed, but five months later the dog gave birth to a litter of winged hounds. The World's Biggest Liar competition is held annually in his memory.

== See also ==
- Listed buildings in Wasdale
