= Norwegian armed forces in exile =

Remnants fighting with the Allies in WWII

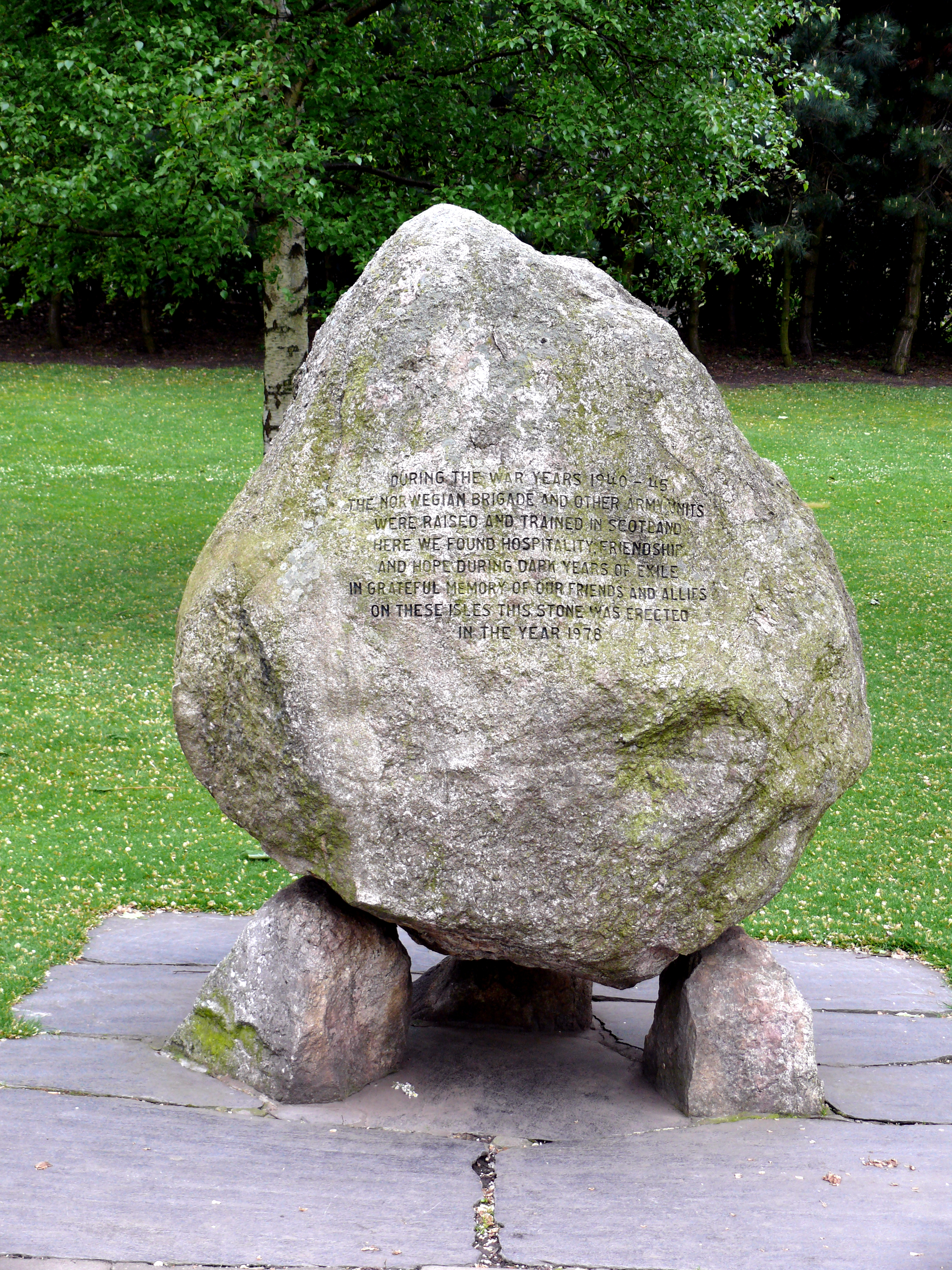
The Norwegian Brigade War Memorial in West Princes Street Gardens, Edinburgh.

The Norwegian armed forces in exile (Norwegian: Utefronten, lit. 'Outside Front') were remnants of the armed forces of Norway that continued to fight the Axis powers from Allied countries, such as Britain and Canada, after they had escaped the German conquest of Norway during World War II.

== Background ==
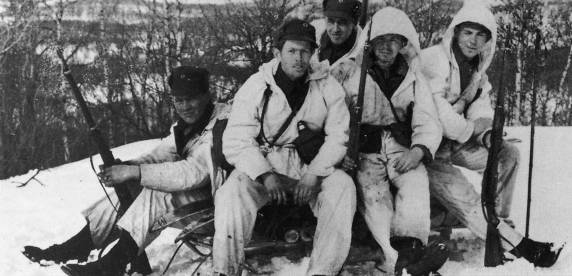
Norwegian soldiers on the front-line north of Narvik, May 1940

Norway was neutral in World War I and tried to remain neutral in World War II. Neutrality was maintained until the German invasion began on 9 April 1940. Norwegian coastal artillery sufficiently delayed the German capture of Oslo to permit Norway's King Haakon VII, the royal family and the government to flee the capital and eventually reach Tromsø at the top of Norway on 2 May.

The Norwegian Army retreated northwards from the capital towards Lillehammer, where they were joined by two British brigades. It was decided that the Allies should concentrate on the recapture of Narvik, which was entered by the Norwegian 6th Division on 28 May. With the help of British, French and Polish forces, the Norwegian defence initially saw a number of successes. For instance, troops were able to take over most of the French line north of the Rombaksfjord and were poised for a major offensive, scheduled for 8 June.

However, the German attack on the Low Countries and France on 14 May forced the Allies to decide a pullout of Norway two weeks later, as the troops were desperately needed in France. Despite reservations on the part of the Norwegians, an evacuation plan was put in effect that involved the exile of the king and the government to Britain and the evacuation of some 25,000 Norwegian soldiers who eventually served in the Free Norwegian forces overseas, which would be commanded by General Carl Gustav Fleischer. King Haakon, Crown Prince Olav, the Norwegian government and some 400 additional civilians were evacuated to Britain by the heavy British cruiser HMS Devonshire. Thirteen ships, five aircraft and 500 men from the Royal Norwegian Navy followed. The evacuation also involved a British battalion stationed at Dombås.

General Ruge stayed, to supervise an orderly withdrawal and successfully demobilise the back areas before the Germans found out what was going on. On 10 June, Ruge signed the treaty of capitulation for the Norwegian Army. The Germans occupied Norway until the German capitulation on 8 May 1945.

== Exiled forces ==
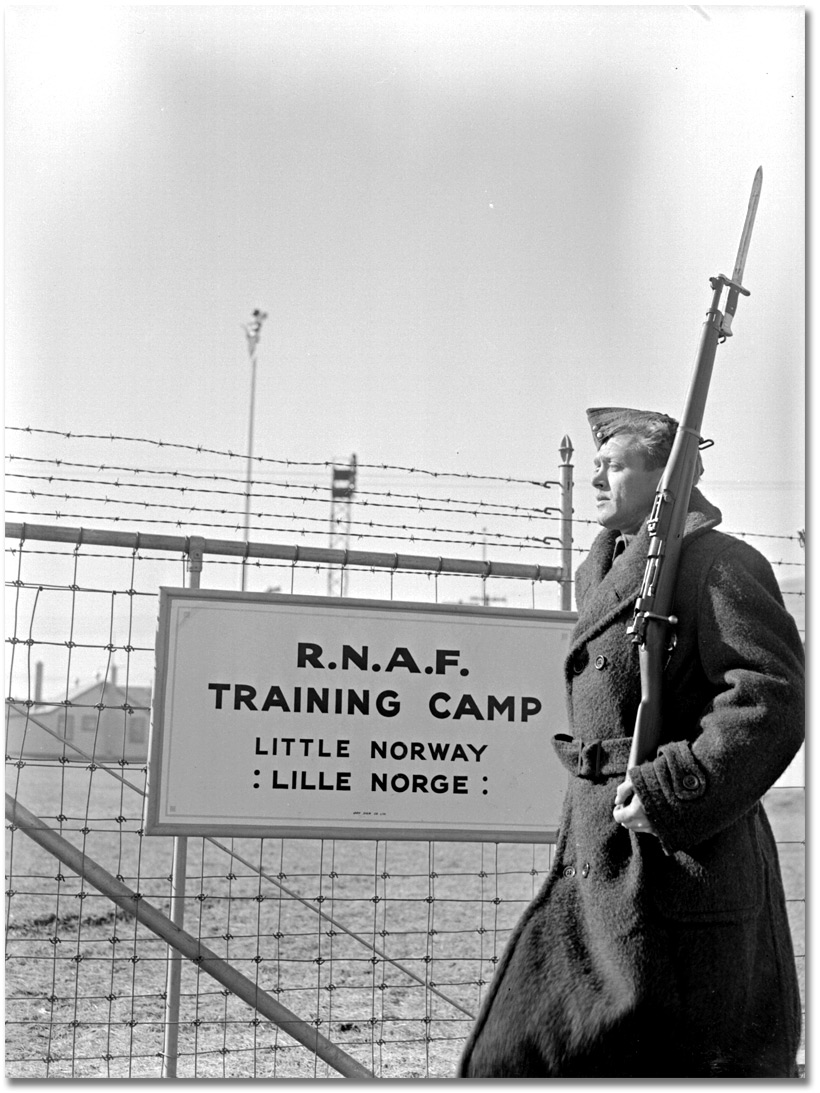
Guard at the Little Norway training camp in Toronto, Ontario, Canada

=== Army ===
Unlike the navy and air force, the army was not able to easily escape, and almost all remained in Norway after the German invasion. Some of these men would form part of the Norwegian resistance forces during the rest of the war until Norway regained freedom in May 1945.

Norwegian soldiers in the United Kingdom formed units including the Norwegian Independent Company 1, and 5 Troop of the No. 10 (Inter-Allied) Commando. During the years in exile in Britain the bulk of the Norwegian Army consisted of a brigade in Dumfries, and smaller units stationed in Iceland, Jan Mayen, Svalbard and South Georgia. Some units were sent to take part in the liberation of Finnmark.

=== Navy ===
The navy was the largest of the three Norwegian armed services that had evacuated to Britain. A new naval headquarters was established in London in June 1940, and with the approval and support of the British government and navy, the Norwegian navy set to work repairing and re-equipping their ships, with the goal of remaining an effective force of resistance against Germany.

==== Rebuilding and early action ====
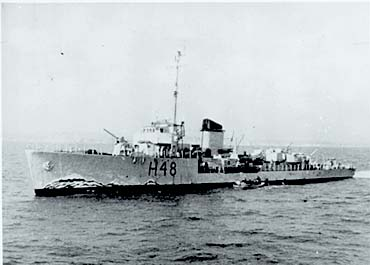
Sleipner at sea sometime after the Second World War.

Of the thirteen ships that escaped to Britain, only one was a modern combat ship: HNoMS Sleipner. Another ship was a much older and nearly obsolete destroyer, HNoMS Draug, launched in 1908. Sleipner was incorporated into the Royal Navy, and assigned to the protection of coastal shipping convoys, a task she performed until 1944. Draug stayed in British coastal waters, serving variously as a guard ship, convoy escort, and depot ship. The other 11 ships consisted of smaller patrol and fishery-protection ships, which were mainly converted into minesweepers and put into service along coastal convoy routes

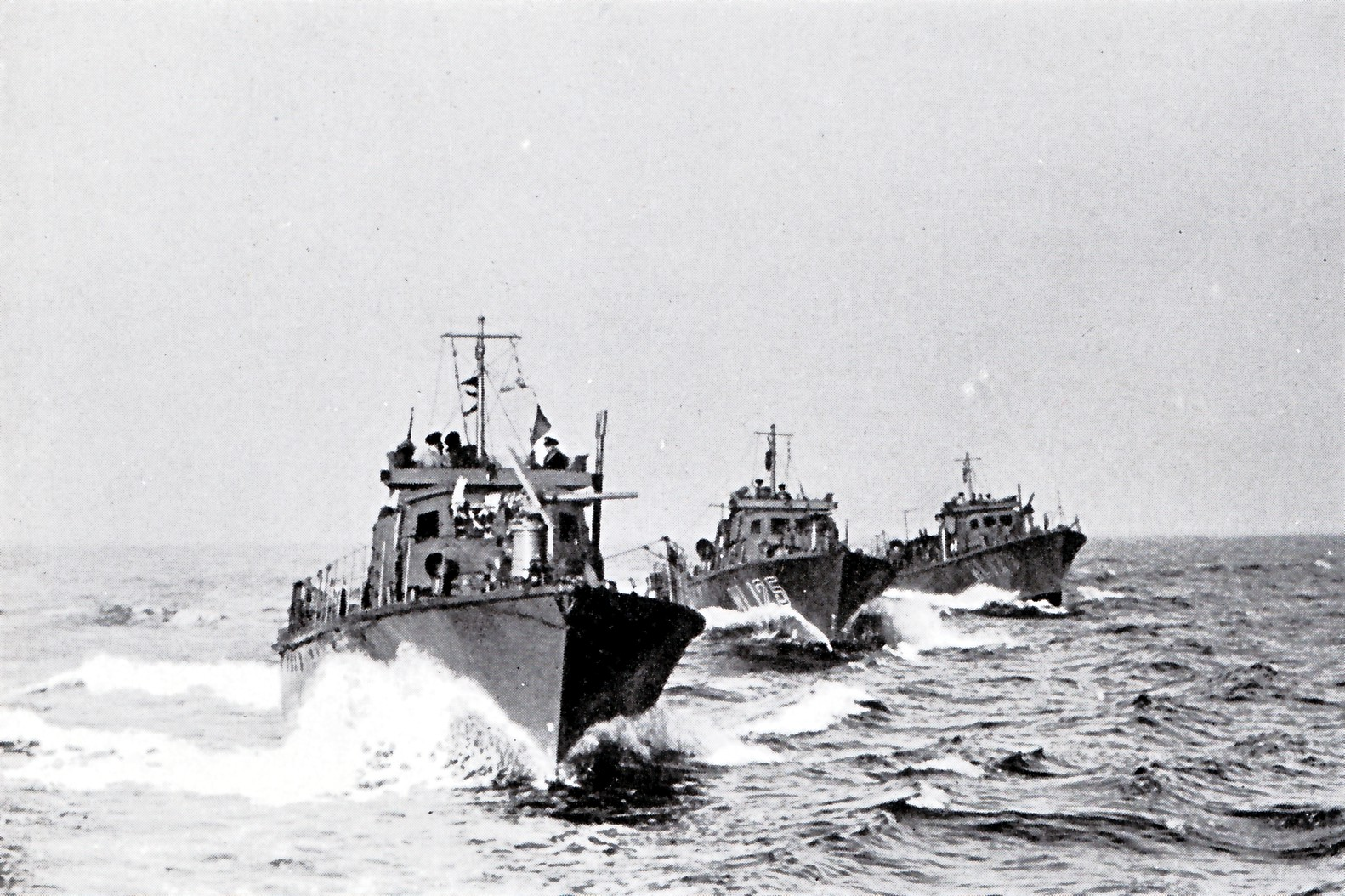
Norwegian motor launches off Dover

The first combatant ships commissioned for the navy in exile were two motor torpedo boats (MTBs), simply named "5" and "6." These were deployed with the British 11th MTB Flotilla, and performed defensive operations in the English channel. Five more MTBs were commissioned and put into service, but were found to be not very seaworthy, and were retired by mid-summer 1942. They were replaced by eight Fairmile D MTBs, which were organized into the 30th MTB Flotilla. This unit worked to disrupt German shipping along the Norwegian coast.

The Norwegian navy requisitioned many fishing and whaling ships from its merchant fleet for conversion into minesweepers, patrol ships, escort vessels, and various other naval auxiliary ships. From among these ships, the Norwegian Naval Independent Unit - which earned the nickname "Shetland bus" for its operations between Shetland and occupied Norway - was formed.

==== Operations in the Atlantic and North Sea ====
Norway had at one point five destroyers, four corvettes, and three patrol/escort vessels deployed with the Liverpool Escort Forces and Western Local Escort Force, to engage in the Battle of the Atlantic. These included five Town-class destroyers operated by the Royal Navy which had been transferred to the Norwegians. One of these, HNoMS Bath, was struck by a German torpedo in August 1941 while escorting a convoy to Gibraltar and sunk, killing 89 of her crew. The Norwegian navy had commissioned five new Flower-class corvettes, which also saw action in the Atlantic. One was torpedoed in November 1942, resulting in the loss of 47 of her crew. Another sank in 1944 after colliding with a destroyer. One Castle-class corvette, HNoMS Tunsberg Castle, struck a mine off the coast of Finnmark in 1944 and was sunk.

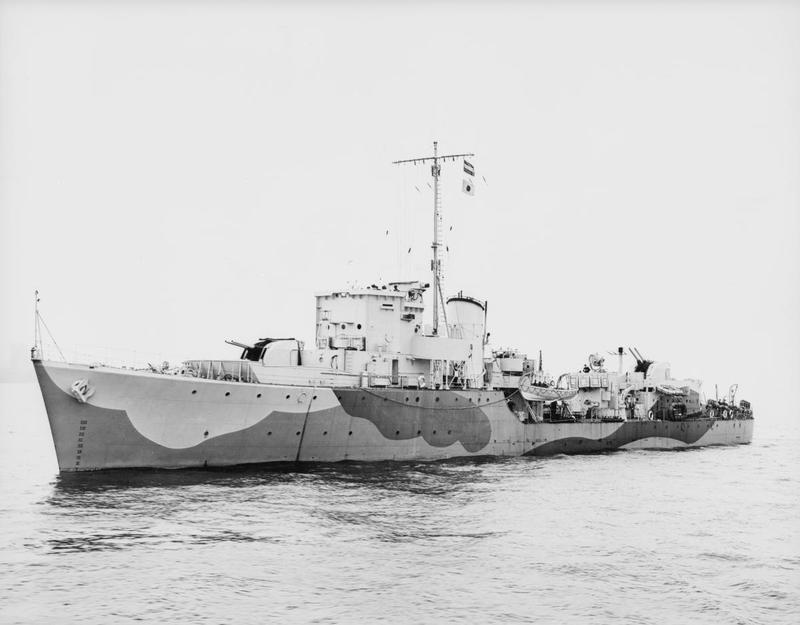
The Royal Norwegian naval destroyer Eskdale

Two Hunt-class destroyers built by the Royal navy were transferred to the Norwegian navy, as HNoMS Eskdale and HNoMS Glaisdale. They served alongside four other British Hunt-class destroyers in the 1st Destroyer Flotilla, conducting offensive operations along the coast of France, and providing defensive support for shipping convoys and minesweeping/minelaying operations. On 14 April 1943, a convoy was attacked by several German E-boats, and Eskdale was hit by two torpedoes and sunk, resulting in the loss of 25 of her crew. Throughout this period, Norwegian minesweeper boats continued working to clear mines from convoy routes and planned offensive channels.

The Norwegian navy acquired a British U-class submarine named HNoMS Uredd in December 1941. Uredd joined the 9th Submarine Flotilla, and participated in operations in the North Sea. She was sunk during her 8th mission, in February 1943; it was only later determined that she had struck a mine, south of the town of Bodø. Another U-class submarine, HNoMS Ula, was acquired in November 1944, and was in service until the end of the war.

The destroyer HNoMS Stord played an integral role in the sinking of the German battleship Scharnhorst in the Battle of the North Cape. Shortly after Scharnhorst's engagement with HMS Duke of York, Stord and three other S-class destroyers were ordered to position themselves for a torpedo strike on the battleship. Along with HMS Scorpion, Stord fired eight torpedoes, four of which hit, incapacitating Scharnhorst and allowing the rest of the Allied fleet to catch up and sink it. After the battle, the commanding officer of Duke of York said "... the Norwegian destroyer Stord carried out the most daring attack of the whole action..."

By the start of 1943, the Norwegian navy had grown to 58 ships and more than 5000 officers and sailors.

==== Operation Overlord and the end of the war ====
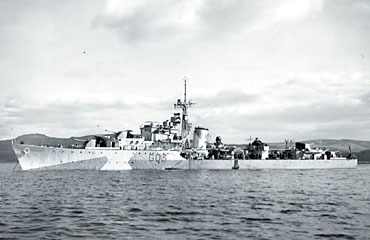
The S-class destroyer Svenner at Scapa Flow.

On D-Day (6 June 1944) the Norwegian navy attached to the invasion of Normandy numbered eleven ships and 1,000 sailors. One ship, the S-class destroyer HNoMS Svenner, was struck by a German torpedo while en route to her bombardment position in the dawn of 6 June and sank, becoming the first Allied ship to be lost that day.

On 26 June HNoMS Glaisdale was badly damaged when she struck a mine off the coast of Normandy. She was towed to port, where she remained out of commission for the rest of the war. The captain of the 1st Destroyer Flotilla spoke well of Glaisdale and her crew, for their 2 years of service in the unit: "...I take the opportunity of expressing my high appreciation of the work done by [HNoMS] Glaisdale while serving with the First Destroyer Flotilla. She has always been a happy and efficient ship..."

By the end of the war, the Norwegian navy had 52 combatant ships and 7,500 men in service. During the fleet-in-exile period, the navy lost 27 ships, and around 25% of all men on ship crews lost their lives.

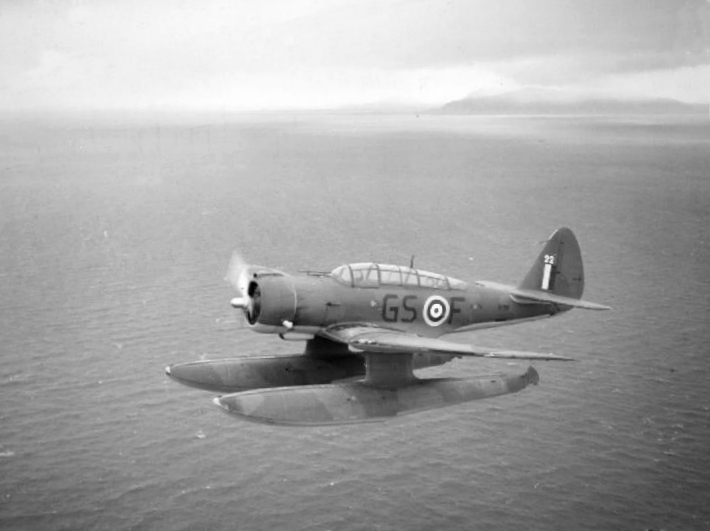
Northrop N-3PB of No. 330 (Norwegian) Squadron based in Iceland

=== Air Force ===
Norway retained separate air forces for the navy and the army until the establishment of the Royal Norwegian Air Force in 1944.

Some aircraft that were ordered prior to hostilities were delivered but few were ready for combat. After the flight to the United Kingdom a training base was established in Canada and many of the pilots joined the RAF in both bomber and fighter commands. Most notable are the two Spitfire squadrons, 331 and 332.

On 1 November 1944 these squadrons were incorporated into the new Royal Norwegian Air Force and were renamed as such along with new squadrons: 330 (Northrop N-3PB, Catalina, Sunderlands), 333 (Catalina, Mosquito) and later 334 (Mosquitos).

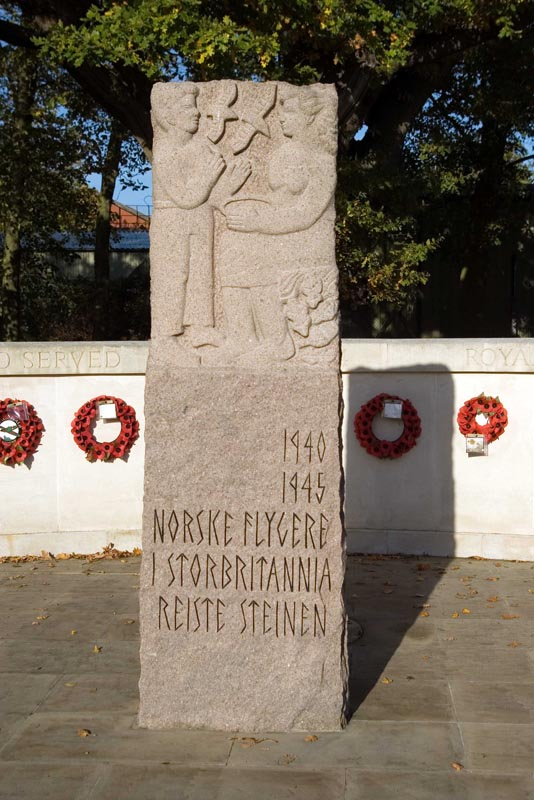
The Norwegian Flyers Memorial at North Weald Airfield in Essex

=== Police troops in Sweden ===
Norwegian police troops, known as Rikspoliti, were recruited from refugees in Sweden during the war. They were funded by the Norwegian government in exile, and trained by the Swedish military. Originally intended to help maintain order in a post-war Norway, 1,442 were flown in early to assist in the Liberation of Finnmark.

== See also ==
- Bamse, heroic St. Bernard dog and mascot for Free Norwegian forces
- 99th Infantry Battalion (United States)
- Norwegian resistance movement
- Operation Doomsday
