= Miterdale Head Wood =

Protected area in Cumbria, England

- Site of Special Scientific Interest
- Location within Cumbria
- Location of Miterdale Head Wood.
- Area of search: Cumbria
- Grid reference: NY164027
- Coordinates: 54.413°N 3.290°W
- Area: 12.2 acres (0.049 km^{2}; 0.019 sq mi)
- Notification date: 1984

Miterdale Head Wood is a Site of Special Scientific Interest (SSSI) within the Lake District National Park, in Cumbria, England. It is 3km east of Santon Bridge near Eskdale. This hazel-birch woodland is protected because of its exceptional diversity of moss and liverwort species.

== Biology ==
The dominant tree in this woodland is hazel that has been managed by coppicing. Liverworts recorded here include species from the genera Syzygiella, Plagiochila, Frullania and Pseudomarsupidium. The liverwort species Syzygiella autumnalis, Plagiochila spinulosa, Plagiochila punctata and Pseudomarsupidium decipiens grow on boulders. Frullania fragilifolia grows on trees. Moss species recorded in this protected area include Chionoloma tenuirostre. Fern species include the scaly male-fern.

Herb species include wood sorrel, heath bedstraw, greater stichwort, yellow pimpernel and primrose. Insect species recorded in this protected area include the Keeled Skimmer dragonfly.

== Land ownership ==
All the land within Miterdale Head Wood SSSI is owned by the Forestry Commission. This protected area is surrounded by plantation woodland. The Miterdale Forest Plan applies to this protected area.
