= Lake District =

Mountainous region and national park in North West England

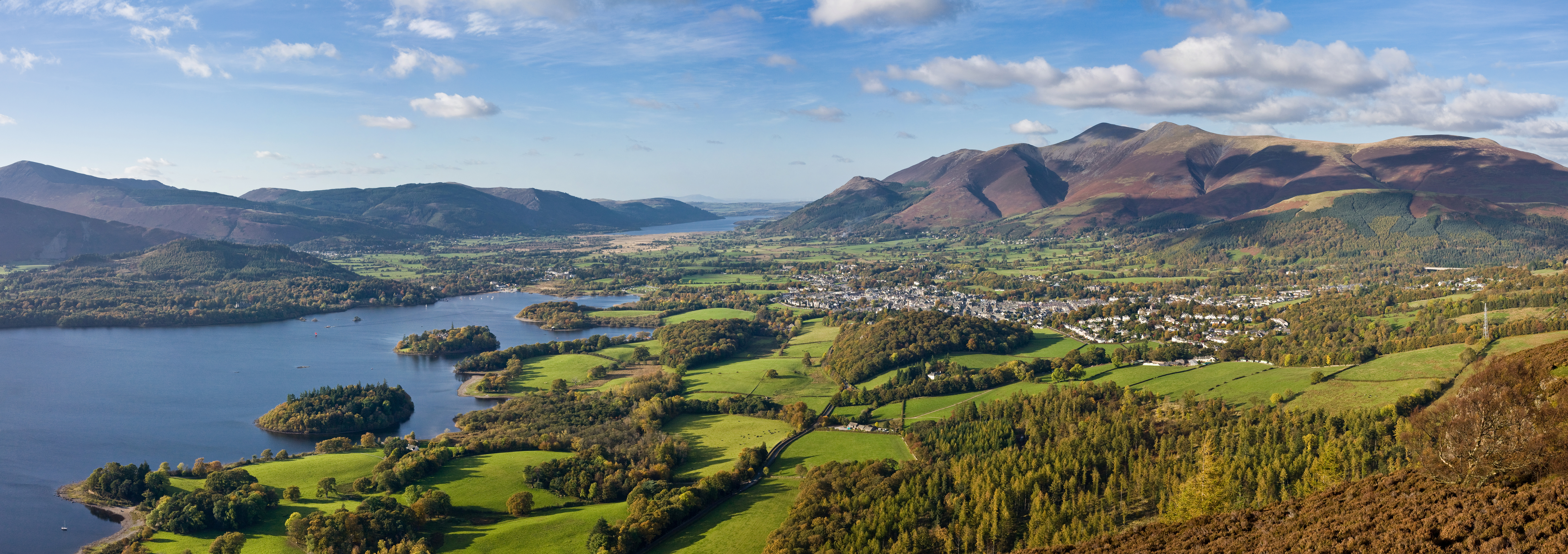
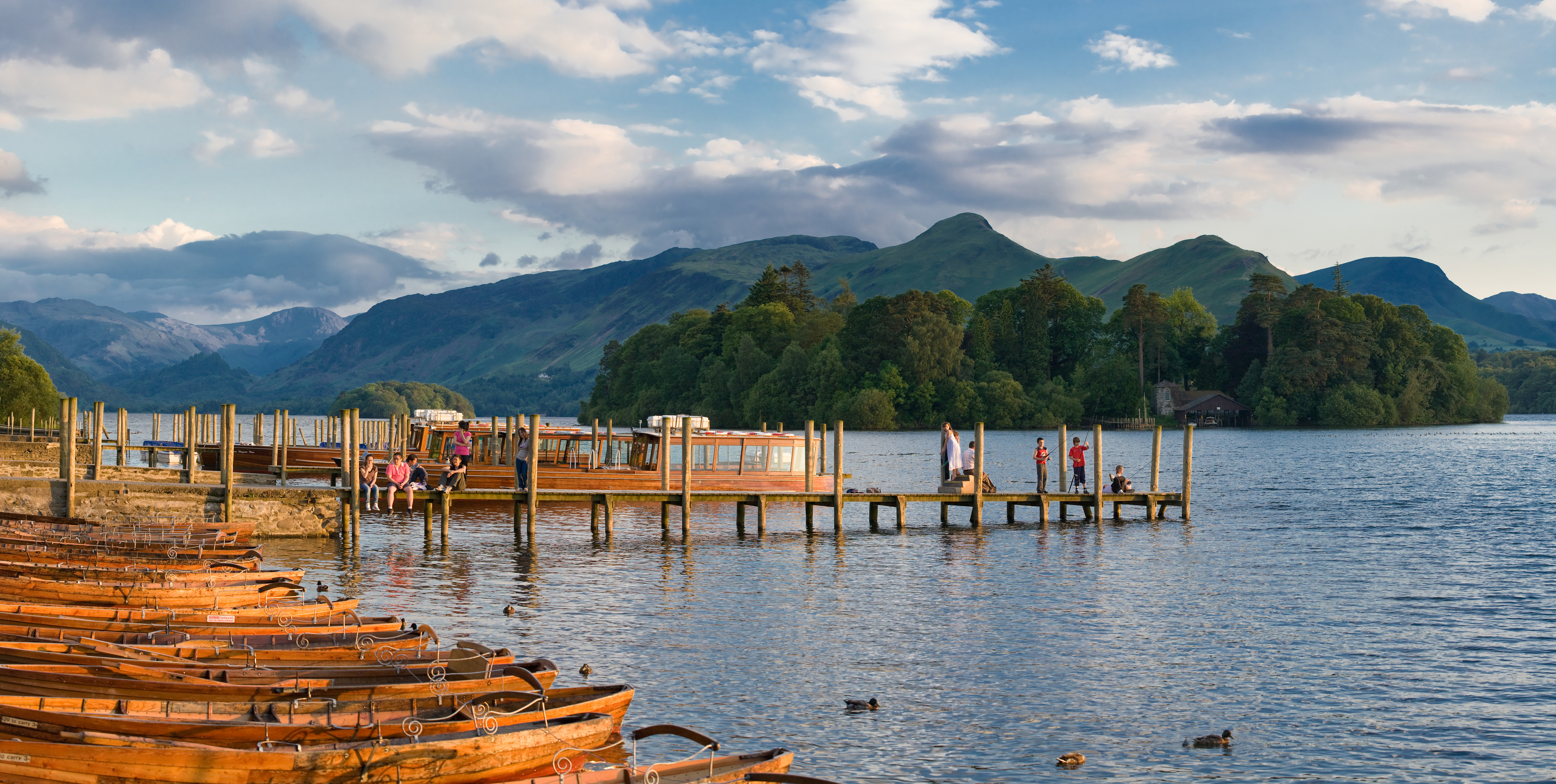
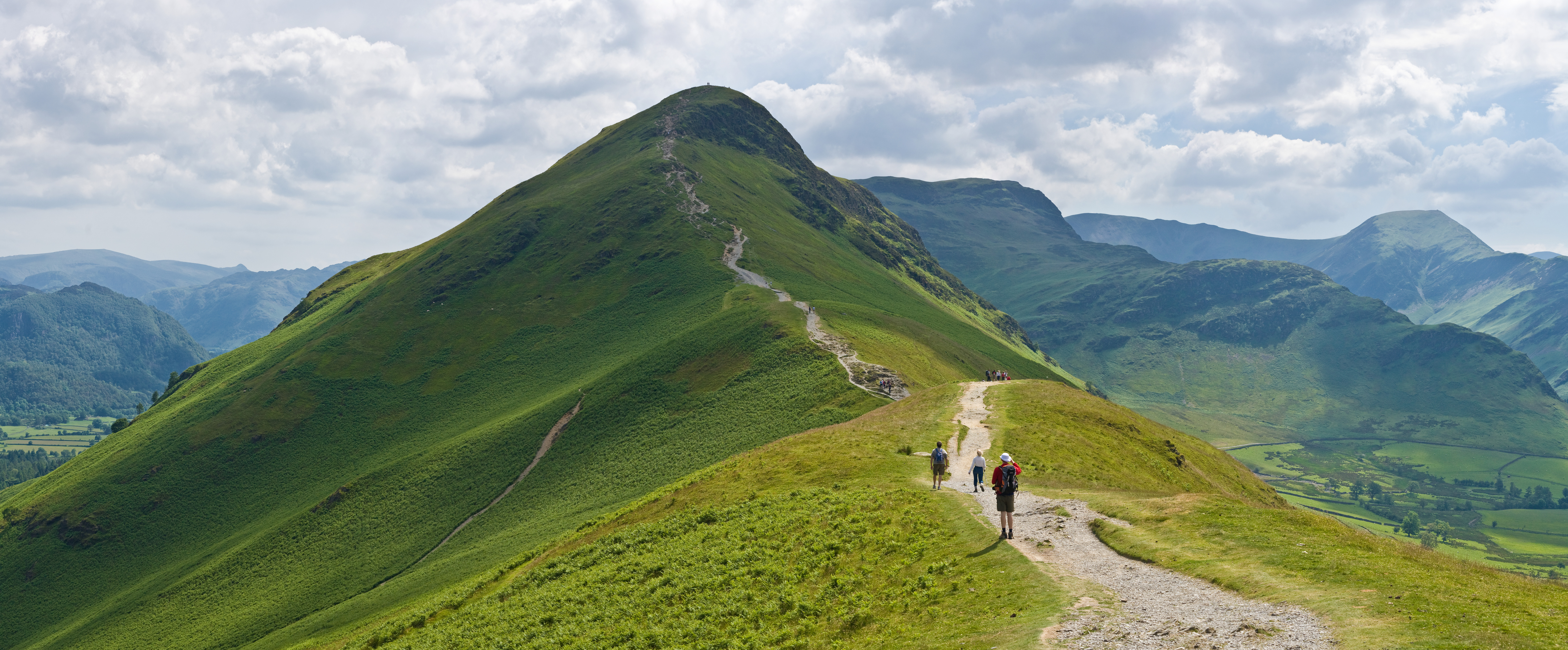
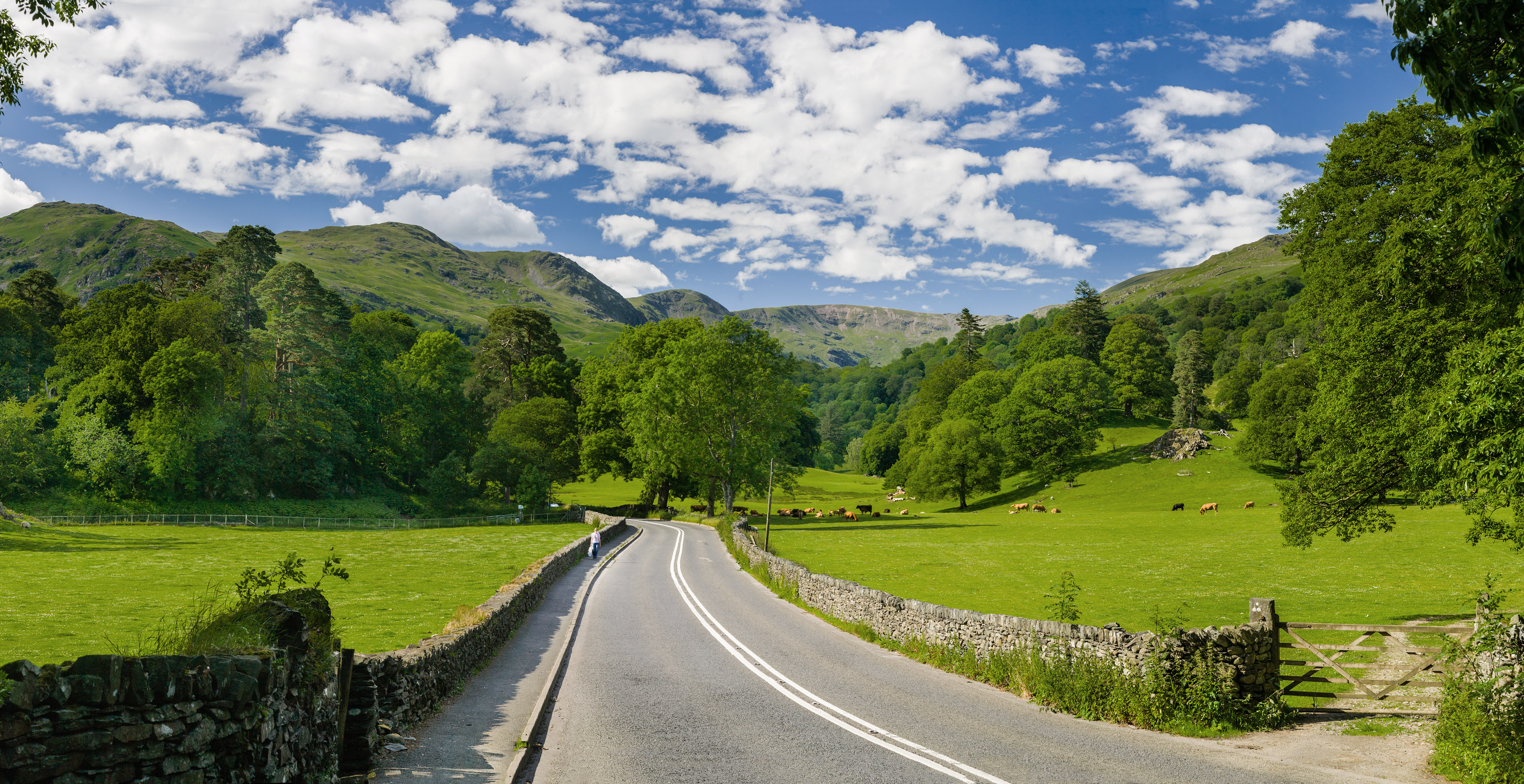
- Top to bottom: view over Keswick, view across Derwent Water, Cat Bells northern ridge, A591 between Ambleside and Grasmere

Highest point
- Peak: Scafell Pike
- Elevation: 978 m (3,209 ft)
- Coordinates: 54°27′15″N 3°12′42″W

Geography
- Location: Cumbria
- Country: England
- Largest lakes by area: Windermere, Ullswater, Derwentwater
- Largest settlements: Kendal, Ambleside, Windermere, Keswick

Geology
- Orogenies: Acadian; Variscan
- Rock age: Primarily Ordovician
- Rock type(s): Primarily volcanic and sedimentary
- Lake District National Park
- IUCN category V (protected landscape/seascape)
- The Lake District national park
- Area: 2,362 km^{2} (912 sq mi)
- Established: 9 May 1951
- Visitors: Visitors a year: 15.8 million; Visitor days a year: 23.1 million
- Governing body: Lake District National Park Authority
- Website: lakedistrict.gov.uk

UNESCO World Heritage Site
- Official name: The English Lake District
- Criteria: Cultural: ii, v, vi
- Reference: 422
- Inscription: 2017 (41st Session)
- Area: 229,205.19 ha (566,378.4 acres)

The Lake District, also known as the Lakes or Lakeland, is a mountainous region and national park in Cumbria, North West England. It is famous for its landscape, including its lakes, coast, and mountains, and for its literary associations with Beatrix Potter, John Ruskin, Arthur Ransome, and the Lake Poets.

The Lakeland fells, or mountains, include England's highest: Scafell Pike (978 m; 3,209 ft), Helvellyn (950 m; 3,120 ft) and Skiddaw (931 m; 3,054 ft). The region also contains sixteen major lakes. They include Windermere, which with a length of 11 miles (18 km) and an area of 5.69 square miles (14.73 km^{2}) is the longest and largest lake in England, and Wast Water, which at 79 metres (259 ft) is the deepest lake in England.

The Lake District National Park was established in 1951, and covers an area of 2,362 km^{2} (912 square miles), the bulk of the region. It was designated a UNESCO World Heritage Site in 2017.

== National Park ==
Lake District National Park (shown as number 2) in a map of national parks in England and Wales

The Lake District National Park includes all of the central Lake District, though the town of Kendal, some coastal areas and the Cartmel and Furness peninsulas are located outside the park's boundary. The area was designated a national park on 9 May 1951, a month after the Peak District, the first UK national park. It retained its original boundaries until 2016, when it was extended by 3% to the east, in the direction of the Yorkshire Dales National Park, to incorporate land of high landscape value around the Lune Valley.

The national park received 17.73 million tourist visitors in 2024. This equates to 26.85 million tourist days, counting visits of greater than three hours. It is the largest of the thirteen national parks in England and Wales and the second largest in the UK after the Cairngorms National Park. Its aim is to protect the landscape by restricting unwelcome change by industry or commerce. The area of the national park, with the exception of the 2016 extension, was designated a World Heritage Site in 2017 as a cultural landscape. This was the fourth attempt to list the park, after two attempts in the 1980s and one in 2012 failed.

The park is governed by the Lake District National Park Authority, which is based at offices in Kendal. It runs a visitor centre on Windermere at a former country house called Brockhole, Coniston Boating Centre, and information centres. The park authority has 20 members: six appointed by Westmorland and Furness Council, four by Cumberland Council, and ten by the Secretary of State for Environment, Food and Rural Affairs.

== Human geography ==
=== General ===
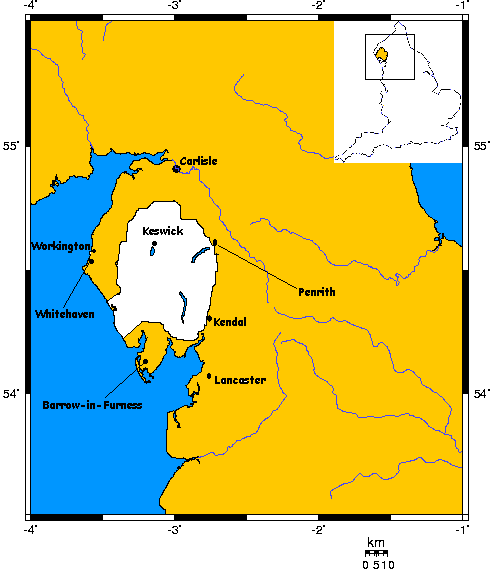
The location of the Lake District and approximate extent, shown in white, within Northern England

The precise extent of the Lake District is undefined, but it is sometimes considered to be slightly larger than that of the National Park, whose total area is about 2,362 square kilometres (912 sq mi). The park extends just over 51 kilometres (32 mi) from east to west and nearly 64 kilometres (40 mi) from north to south, with areas such as the Lake District Peninsulas to the south lying outside the National Park.

=== Settlement ===
There are only a few major settlements within this mountainous area: the towns of Keswick; Windermere and Bowness-on-Windermere (which are contiguous); and Ambleside, are the three largest. The economies of all these are heavily dependent on tourism. Significant settlements close to the boundary of the national park include Carlisle, Barrow-in-Furness, Kendal, Ulverston, Dalton-in-Furness, Whitehaven, Workington, Cockermouth, Penrith, Millom and Grange-over-Sands; each of these has important economic links with the area. Other villages are Coniston, Threlkeld, Glenridding, Pooley Bridge, Broughton-in-Furness, Grasmere, Newby Bridge, Staveley, Lindale, Gosforth and Hawkshead. Beyond these are a scattering of hamlets and many isolated farmsteads, some of which are still tied to agriculture; others now function as part of the tourist economy.

=== Communications ===
==== Roads ====
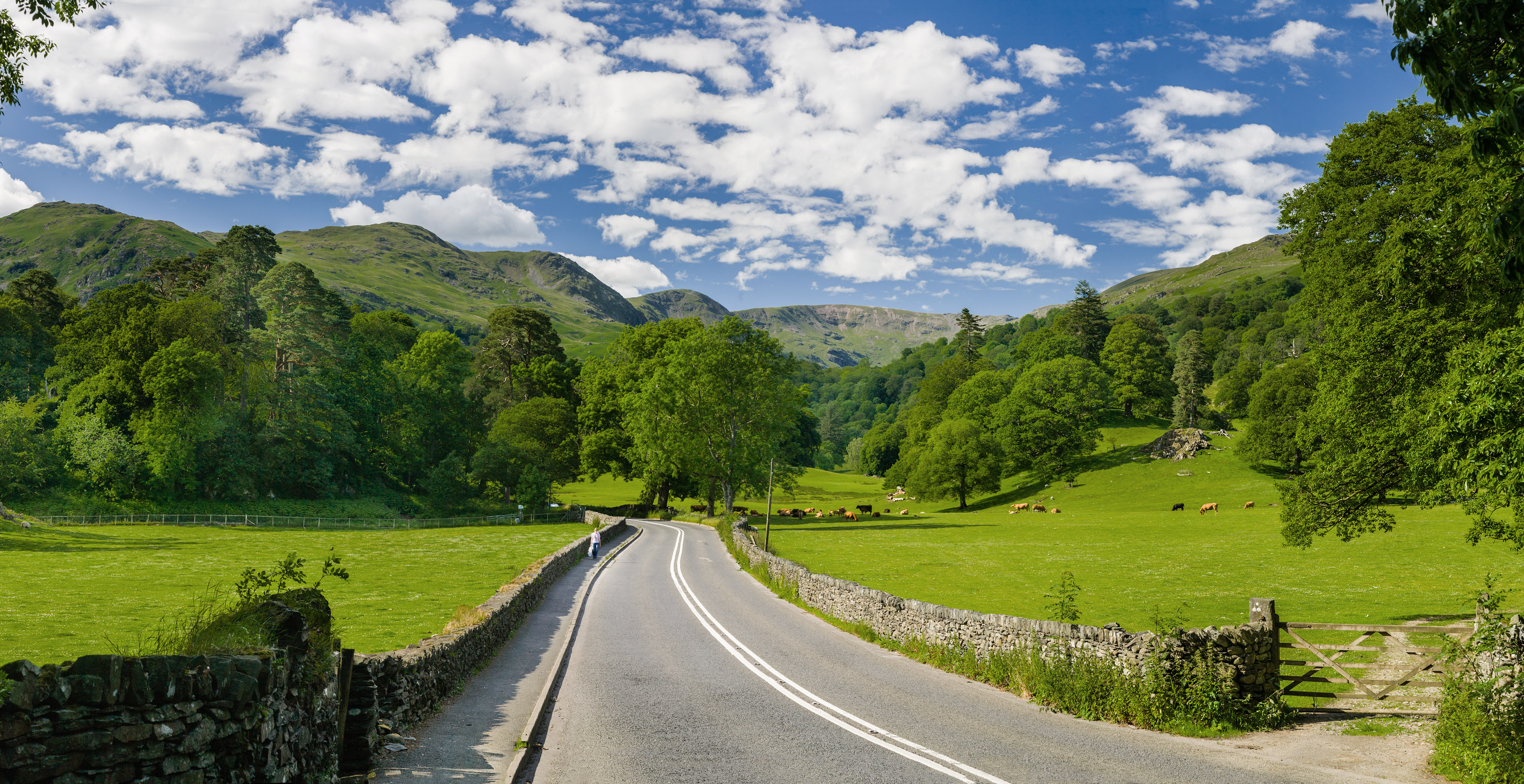
The A591 road as it passes through the countryside between Ambleside and Grasmere

The Lake District is very nearly contained within a box of trunk routes and major A roads. It is flanked to the east by the A6 road, which runs from Kendal to Penrith (though the National Park extension approved in 2015 is east of the A6); across its southern fringes by the A590, which connects the M6 to Barrow-in-Furness, and the A5092, and across its northern edge by the A66 trunk road between Penrith and Workington. The A595 (linking the A66 with the A5092) forms the park boundary from Calder Bridge to Holmrook, where the park boundary becomes the sea. The A595 crosses the coastal plain of the park until turning inland at the Whicham Valley, forming much of the park boundary again until joining the A5092 at Grizebeck.

Besides these, a few A roads penetrate the area itself, notably the A591 which runs north-westwards from Kendal to Windermere and then on to Keswick. It continues up the east side of Bassenthwaite Lake. "The A591, Grasmere, Lake District" was short-listed in the 2011 Google Street View awards in the Most Romantic Street category. The A593 and A5084 link the Ambleside and Coniston areas with the A590 to the south whilst the A592 and A5074 similarly link Windermere with the A590. The A592 also continues northwards from Windermere to Ullswater and Penrith by way of the Kirkstone Pass.

Some valleys which are not penetrated by A roads are served by B roads. The B5289 serves Lorton Vale and Buttermere and links via the Honister Pass with Borrowdale. The B5292 ascends the Whinlatter Pass from Lorton Vale before dropping down to Braithwaite near Keswick. The B5322 serves the valley of St John's in the Vale whilst Great Langdale is served by the B5343. Other valleys such as Little Langdale, Eskdale and Dunnerdale are served by minor roads. The last of these is connected with the first two by the Wrynose and Hardknott passes respectively; both of these passes are known for their steep gradients and are together one of the most popular climbs in the United Kingdom for cycling enthusiasts. A minor road through the Newlands Valley connects via Newlands Hause with the B5289 at Buttermere. Wasdale is served by a cul-de-sac minor road, (Note: Walkers from other valleys are often surprised at the length (and cost) of a taxi journey back to their starting point if they descend from the fells into Wasdale. For instance, Seatoller to Wasdale head is about 6 miles on foot, but 49 miles by road.) as is Longsleddale and the valleys at Haweswater and Kentmere. There are networks of minor roads in the lower-lying southern part of the area, connecting numerous communities between Kendal, Windermere, and Coniston.

==== Railways and ferries ====
The West Coast Main Line skirts the eastern edge of the Lake District and the Cumbrian Coast Line passes through the southern and western fringes of the area. A single railway line, the Windermere Branch Line, penetrates from Kendal to Windermere via Staveley. Railways once served Broughton-in-Furness and Coniston (closed to passengers in 1958) and another ran from Penrith to Cockermouth via Keswick (closed west of Keswick in 1966 and completely in 1972). Part of the track of the latter is used by the improved A66 trunk road.

The Cumbrian Coast Line has three stations within the boundaries of the national park (and additionally Drigg, about a third of a mile from the park boundary). The line gives railway enthusiasts and others a flavour of a pre-Beeching railway line, with features like manually operated level crossing gates. It gives a good connection to the Ravenglass and Eskdale Railway. This narrow-gauge railway travels from the coast (at Ravenglass) into Eskdale. Often operated with steam locomotives, it provides access for cyclists and walkers to the Western Fells, as well as being an attraction in its own right. It reaches as far as the station at Dalegarth near Boot.

A heritage railway, the Lakeside and Haverthwaite Railway, runs between Lake Windermere and Haverthwaite, and tourists can connect at Lakeside with the boats up the lake to Bowness.

A vehicle-carrying cable ferry, the Windermere Ferry, runs frequent services across Windermere. There are also seasonal passenger boats on Coniston Water, Derwent Water, and Ullswater.

==== Footpaths and bridleways ====
There are many paths over which the public has a right of way, all of which are signposted at their origin on public roads and at some other points. Within the area of the National Park in 2012 there were 2,159 km (1,342 mi) of public footpaths, 875 km (544 mi) of public bridleways, 15 km (9 mi) of restricted byways and 30 km (19 mi) of byways open to all traffic, (Note: Bridleways are intended for horse riding and walkers, with cyclists also permitted to use them. Cyclists must give way to all other bridleway users. Motor vehicles are only allowed on "byways open to all traffic" (green lanes) but in practice Traffic Regulation Orders have been brought in on several prohibiting motor traffic.) although a system of permits operates on Gatescarth Pass. There is also a general "right to roam" over much of the open country (defined as "mountain, moor, heath and down"), which includes approximately 50% of the national park.

Many of these tracks arose centuries ago and were used either as ridge highways (such as along High Street) or as passes for travelling across the ridges between settlements in the valleys. Historically these paths were not planned for reaching summits, but more recently they are used by fell walkers for that purpose. The Coast to Coast Walk, which crosses the north of England from the Irish Sea to the North Sea, traverses the national park from west to east.

==== Land ownership ====
Most of the land within the national park is in private ownership, with about 55% registered as agricultural land. Landowners include:

- Individual farmers and other private landowners, with more than half of the agricultural land farmed by the owners.
- The National Trust owns around 25% of the total area (including some lakes and land of significant landscape value).
- The Forestry Commission and other investors in forests and woodland.
- United Utilities (owns 8%)
- Lake District National Park Authority (owns 3.9%)

== Physical geography ==
The Lake District is a roughly circular upland massif, deeply dissected by a broadly radial pattern of major valleys which are largely the result of repeated glaciations over the last 2 million years. The apparent radial pattern is not from a central dome, but from an axial watershed extending from St Bees Head in the west to Shap in the east. Most of these valleys display the U-shaped cross-section characteristic of glacial origin and often contain long narrow lakes in bedrock hollows, with tracts of relatively flat ground at their infilled heads, or where they are divided by lateral tributaries (Buttermere-Crummock Water; Derwent Water-Bassenthwaite Lake). (Note: A stream flowing into a lake may create a delta. The delta of a side stream can completely cross a narrow lake dividing it into two by a stretch of flat land.) Smaller lakes known as tarns occupy glacial cirques at higher elevations. It is the abundance of both which has led to the area becoming known as the Lake District.

Many of the higher fells are rocky, while moorland predominates lower down. Vegetation cover in better-drained areas includes bracken and heather, although much of the land is boggy, due to the high rainfall. Deciduous native woodland occurs on many of the steeper slopes below the tree line, but with native oak supplemented by extensive conifer plantations in many areas, particularly Grizedale Forest in the generally lower southern part of the area. The Lake District extends to the sea to the west and south.

The highest mountain in England, Scafell Pike (978 m or 3209 feet), has a far-reaching view on a clear day, ranging from the Galloway Hills of Scotland, the Mourne Mountains in Northern Ireland, the Isle of Man, and Snowdonia in Wales.

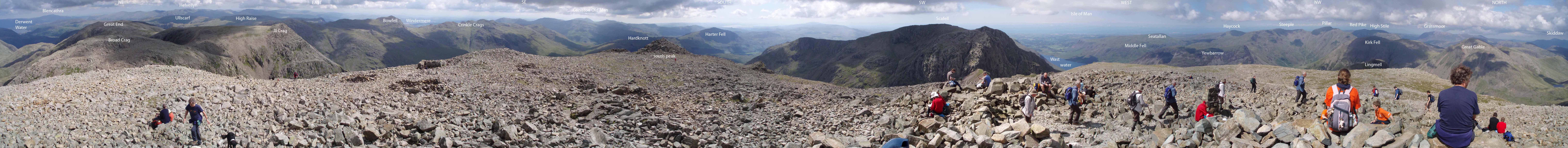
A panorama from the summit of Scafell Pike, August 2007
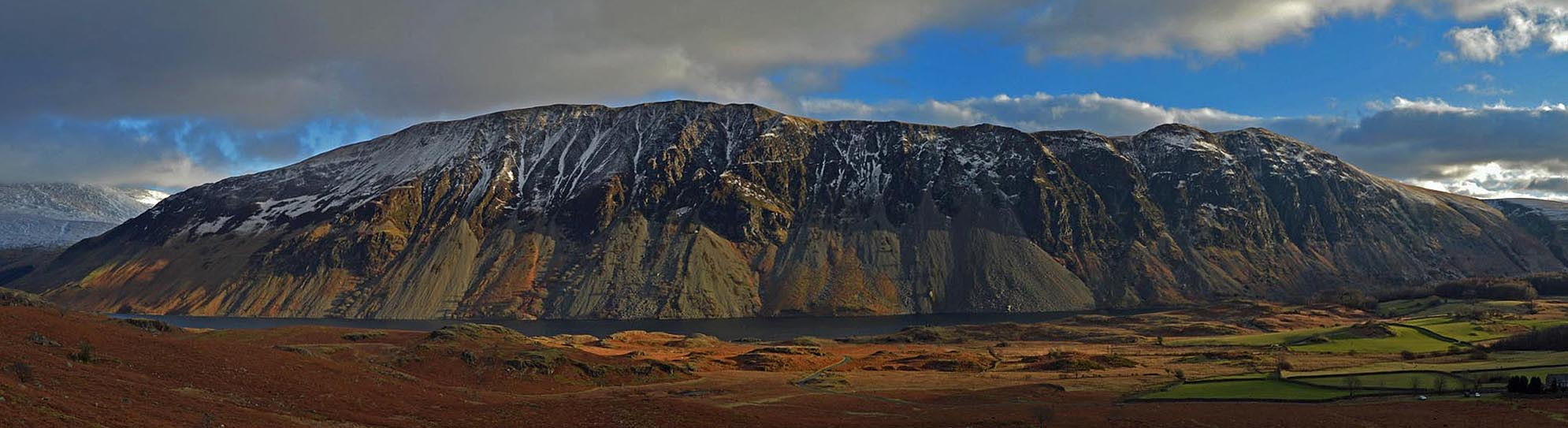
Panorama of the Wasdale screes descending into Wastwater, the deepest lake in England

=== Cumbrian Mountains ===
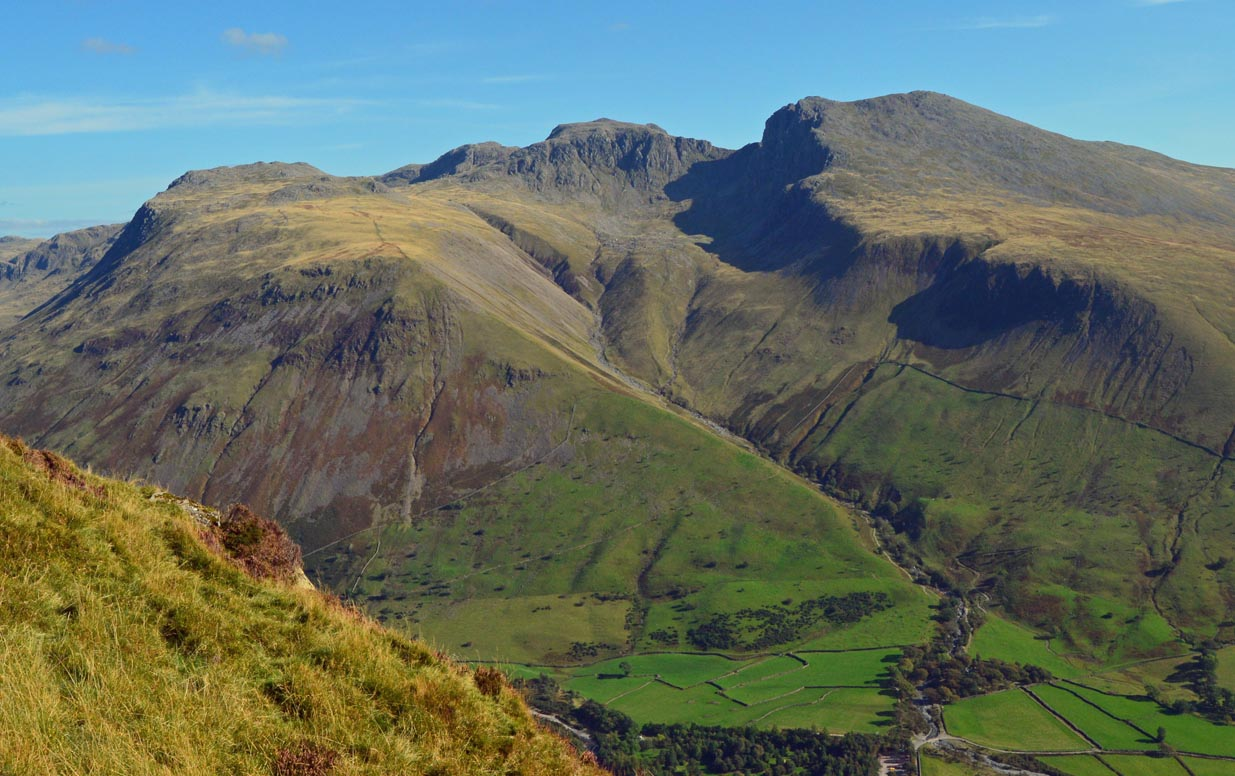
The Scafell massif, the highest ground in England, seen over Wasdale

Major fells and towns shown within the National Park

The mountains (or 'fells') of the Lake District are known as the "Cumbrian Mountains", "Cumbrian Fells" or "Lakeland Fells". The four highest fells exceed 3,000 feet (914 m). These are:

- Scafell Pike, 978 m (3,209 ft)
- Scafell, 965 m (3,166 ft)
- Helvellyn, 951 m (3,120 ft)
- Skiddaw, 931 m (3,054 ft)

==== Northern Fells ====
The Northern Fells are a clearly defined range of hills contained within a 13 km (8 mi) diameter circle between Keswick in the southwest and Caldbeck in the northeast. They culminate in the 931 m (3,054 ft) peak of Skiddaw. Other notable peaks are Blencathra (also known as Saddleback) (868 m (2,848 ft)) and Carrock Fell. Much of this area falls within the Skiddaw Group SSSI, a Site of Special Scientific Interest designated for its ecology and geology. Bassenthwaite Lake occupies the valley between this massif and the North Western Fells.

==== North Western Fells ====
The North Western Fells lie between Borrowdale and Bassenthwaite Lake to the east and Buttermere and Lorton Vale to the west. Their southernmost point is at Honister Pass. This area includes the Derwent Fells above the Newlands Valley and hills to the north amongst which are Dale Head, Robinson. To the north stand Grasmoor, highest in the range at 852 m (2,795 ft), Grisedale Pike and the hills around the valley of Coledale, and in the far northwest is Thornthwaite Forest and Lord's Seat. The fells in this area are rounded Skiddaw slate, with few tarns and relatively few rock faces.

==== Western Fells ====
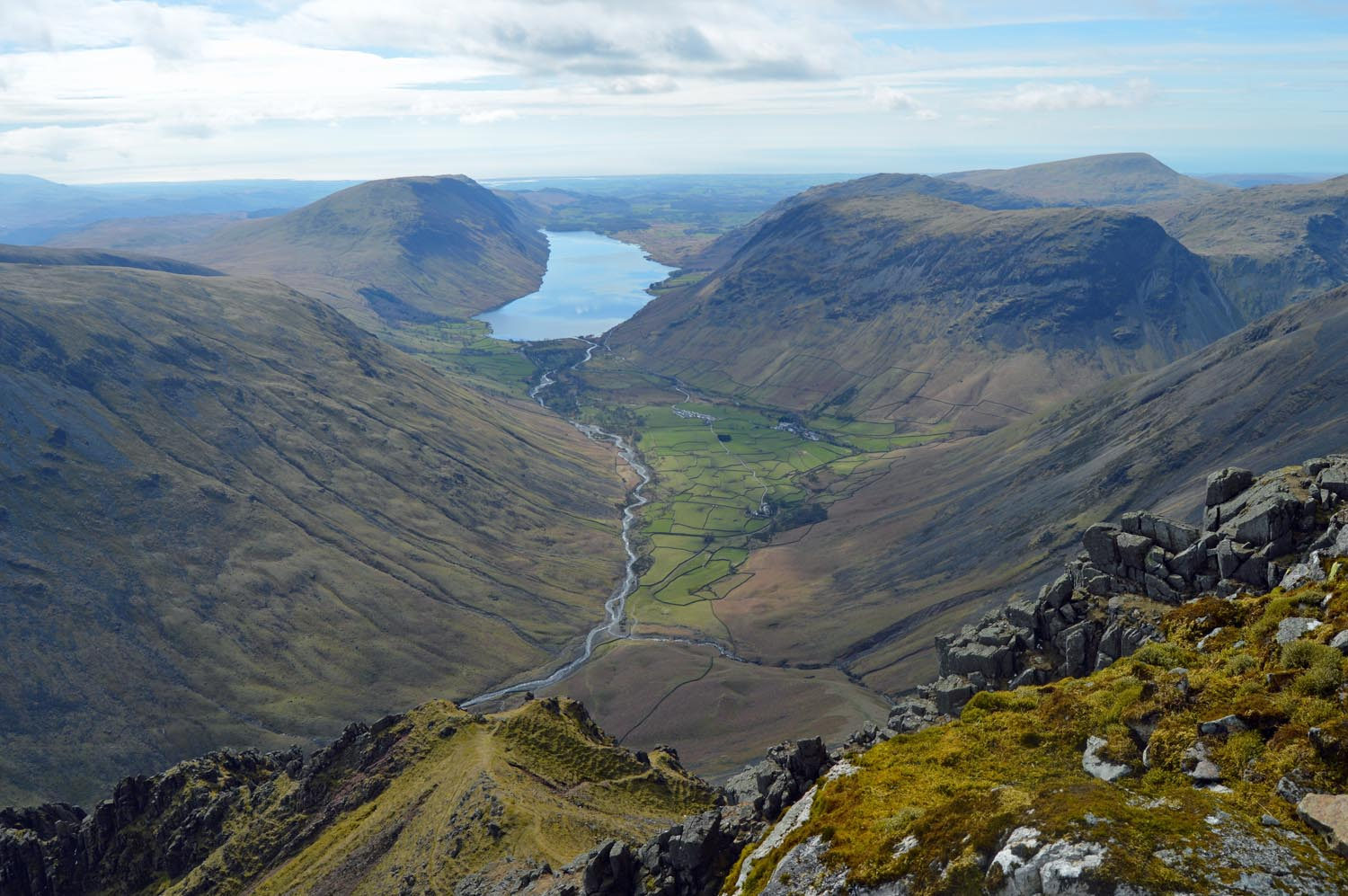
The view towards Wast Water from the cairn built by two brothers named 'Westmorland' in 1876, to the SW of the summit of Great Gable, which they considered the finest view in the district

The Western Fells lie between Buttermere and Wasdale, with Sty Head forming the apex of a large triangle. Ennerdale bisects the area, which consists of the High Stile ridge north of Ennerdale, the Loweswater Fells in the far northwest, the Pillar group in the southwest, and Great Gable (899 m (2,949 ft)) near Sty Head. Other tops include Seatallan, Haystacks and Kirk Fell. This area is craggy and steep, with the impressive pinnacle of Pillar Rock its showpiece. Wastwater, located in this part, is England's deepest lake.

==== Central Fells ====
The Central Fells are lower in elevation than surrounding areas of fell, peaking at 762 m (2,500 ft) at High Raise. They take the form of a ridge running between Derwent Water in the west and Thirlmere in the east, from Keswick in the north to Langdale Pikes in the south. A spur extends southeast to Loughrigg Fell above Ambleside. The central ridge running north over High Seat is exceptionally boggy.

==== Eastern Fells ====
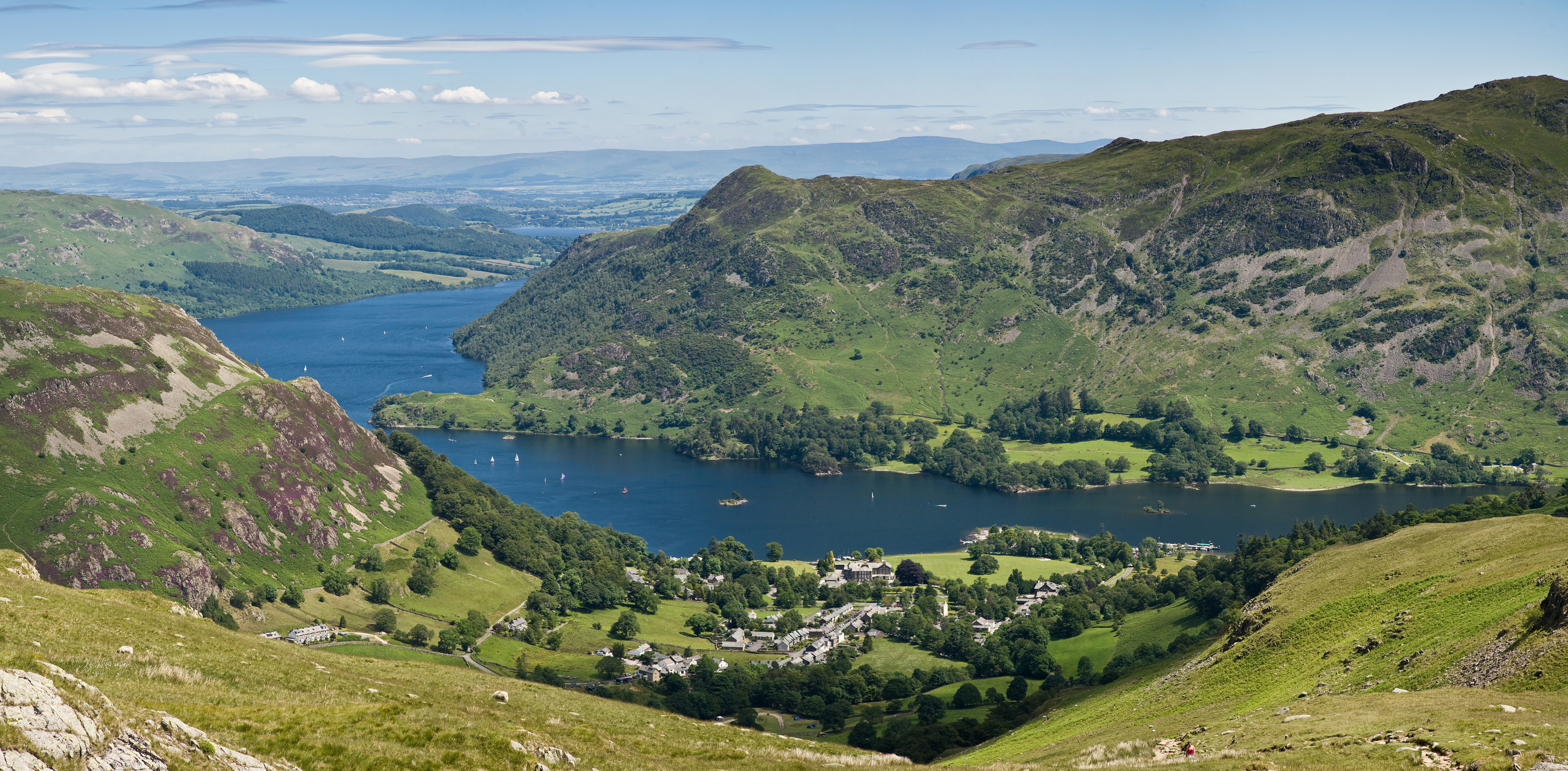
The village of Glenridding and Ullswater

The Eastern Fells consist of a long north-to-south ridge, the Helvellyn range, running from Clough Head to Seat Sandal with the 950 m (3,118 ft) Helvellyn at its highest point. The western slopes of these summits tend to be grassy, with rocky corries and crags on the eastern side. The Fairfield group lies to the south of the range and forms a similar pattern with towering rock faces and hidden valleys spilling into the Patterdale valley. It culminates in the height of Red Screes overlooking the Kirkstone Pass.

==== Far Eastern Fells ====
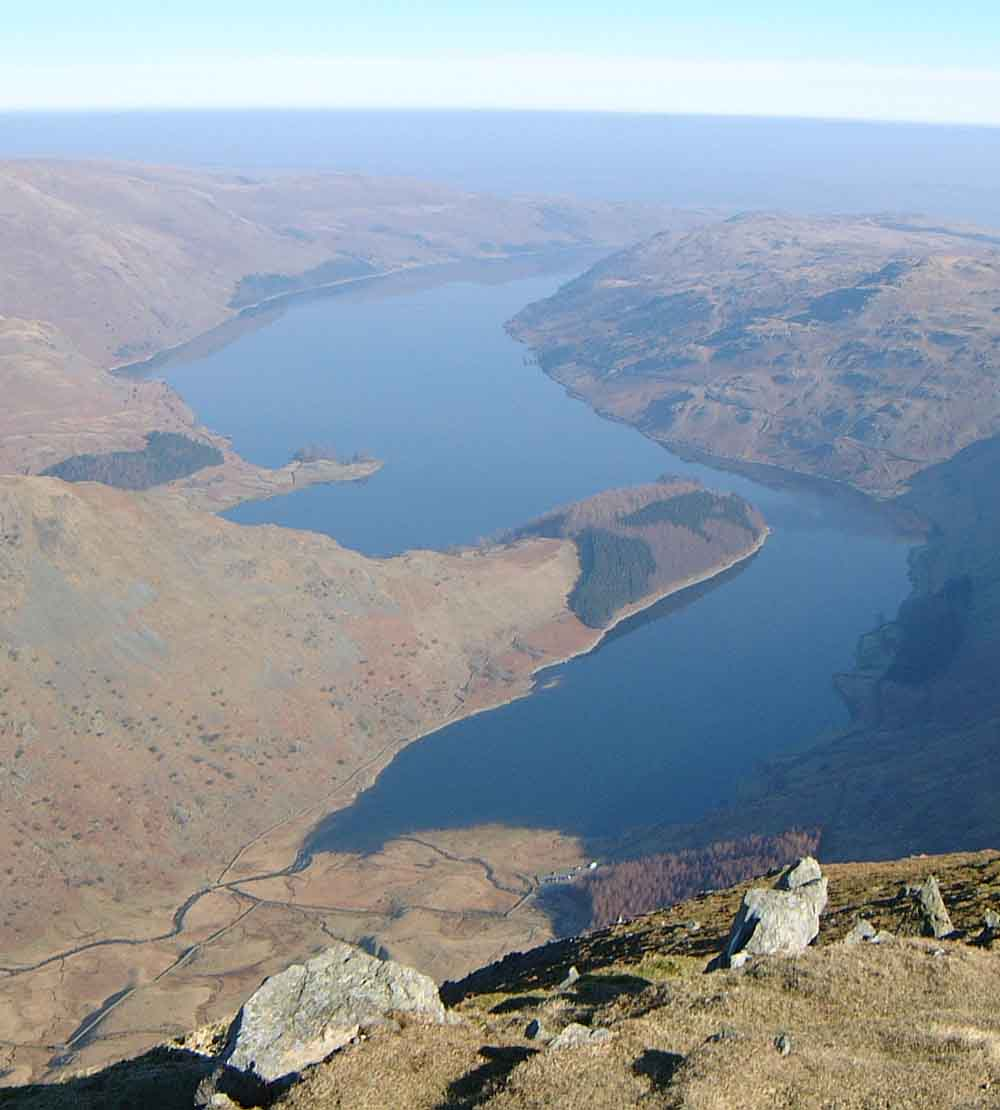
Haweswater Reservoir from Harter Fell

The Far Eastern Fells refers to all of the Lakeland fells to the east of Ullswater and the A592 road running south to Windermere. At 828 m (2,717 ft), the peak known as High Street is the highest point on a complex ridge that runs broadly north-south and overlooks the hidden valley of Haweswater to its east. In the north of this region are the lower fells of Martindale Common and Bampton Common whilst in the south are the fells overlooking the Kentmere valley. Further to the east, beyond Mardale and Longsleddale is Shap Fell, an extensive area consisting of high moorland, more rolling and Pennine in nature than the mountains to the west.

==== Southern Fells ====
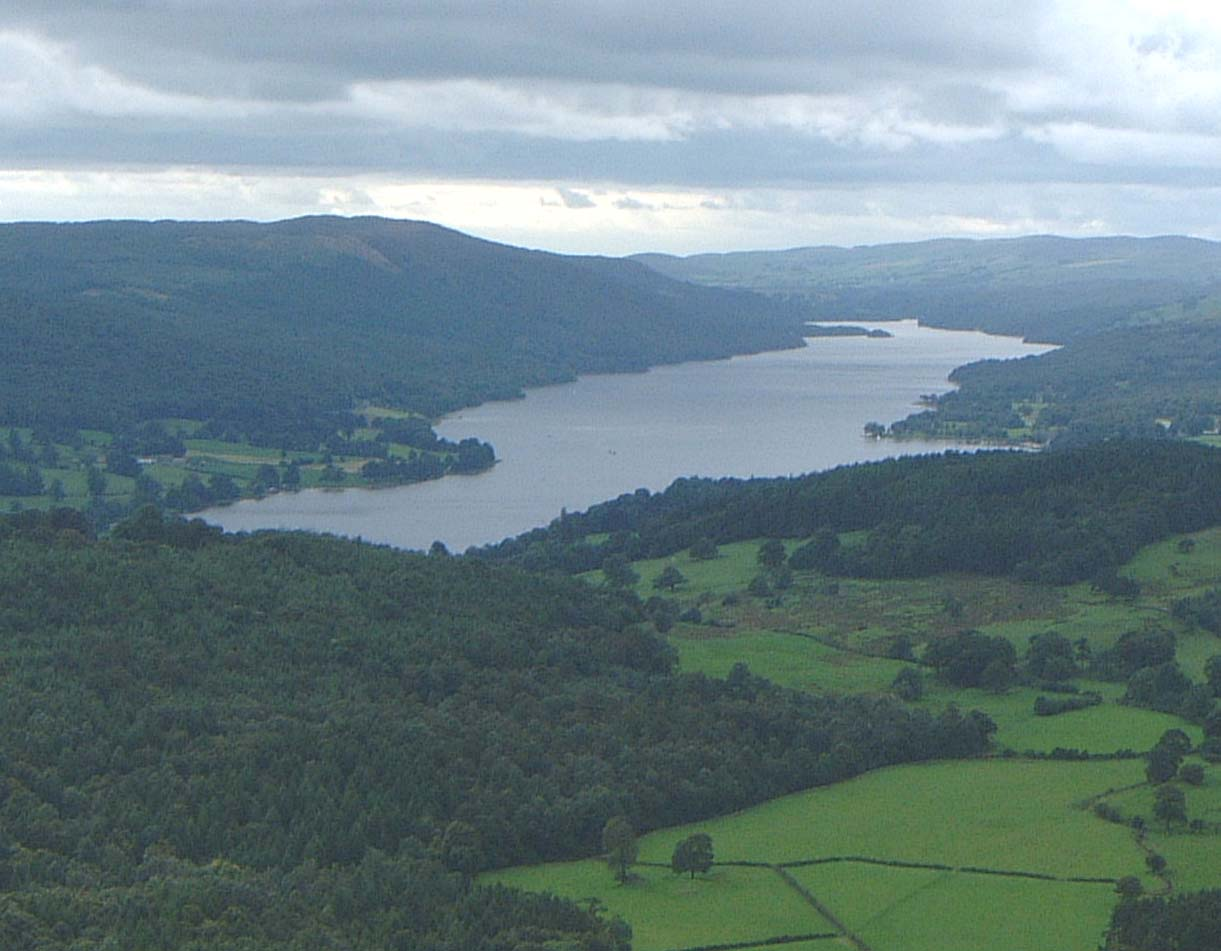
Coniston Water from Holme Fell

The Southern Fells occupy the southwestern quarter of the Lake District. They can be regarded as comprising a northern grouping between Wasdale, Eskdale, and the two Langdale valleys, a southeastern group east of Dunnerdale and south of Little Langdale, and a southwestern group bounded by Eskdale to the north and Dunnerdale to the east.

The first group includes England's highest mountains: Scafell Pike in the centre, at 978 m (3,209 ft) and Scafell one mile (1.6 km) to the southwest. Though it is slightly lower, Scafell has a 700 ft (210 m) rockface, Scafell Crag, on its northern side. This group also includes the Wastwater Screes overlooking Wasdale, the Glaramara ridge overlooking Borrowdale, the three tops of Crinkle Crags, Bowfell and Esk Pike. The core of the area is drained by the infant River Esk. Collectively these are some of the Lake District's most rugged hillsides.

The second group, otherwise known as the Furness Fells or Coniston Fells, have as their northern boundary the steep and narrow Hardknott and Wrynose passes. The highest are Old Man of Coniston and Swirl How which slightly exceed 800 m (2,600 ft).

The third group to the west of the Duddon includes Harter Fell and the long ridge leading over Whitfell to Black Combe and the sea. The south of this region consists of lower forests and knolls, with Kirkby Moor on the southern boundary. The southwestern Lake District ends near the Furness peninsula and Barrow-in-Furness, a town which many Lake District residents rely on for basic amenities. Miterdale Head Wood is a site of special scientific interest in the region.

==== Southeastern area ====
The southeastern area is the territory between Coniston Water and Windermere and east of Windermere towards Kendal and south to Lindale. There are no high summits in this area which are mainly low hills, knolls and limestone cuestas such as Gummer's How and Whitbarrow. Indeed, it rises only as high as 333 m (1,093 ft) at Top o' Selside east of Coniston Water; the wide expanse of Grizedale Forest stands between the two lakes. Kendal and Morecambe Bay stand at the eastern and southern edges of the area.

=== Valleys ===
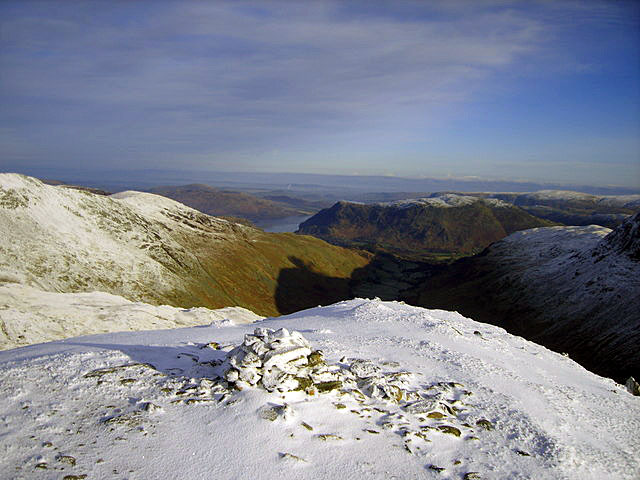
The Tongue, towards Grisedale Valley with Ullswater in the distance (looking from Dollywaggon Pike)

The main radial valleys are (clockwise from the south) Dunnerdale, Eskdale, Wasdale, Ennerdale, the Vale of Lorton, and Buttermere valley, the Derwent Valley and Borrowdale, the Ullswater valley, Haweswater valley, Longsleddale, the Kentmere valley, those converging on the head of Windermere - Grasmere, Great Langdale and Little Langdale, and the Coniston Water valley. The valleys break the mountains up into blocks, which have been described by various authors in different ways. The most frequently encountered approach is that made popular by Alfred Wainwright who published seven separate area guides to the Lakeland Fells.

=== Lakes ===
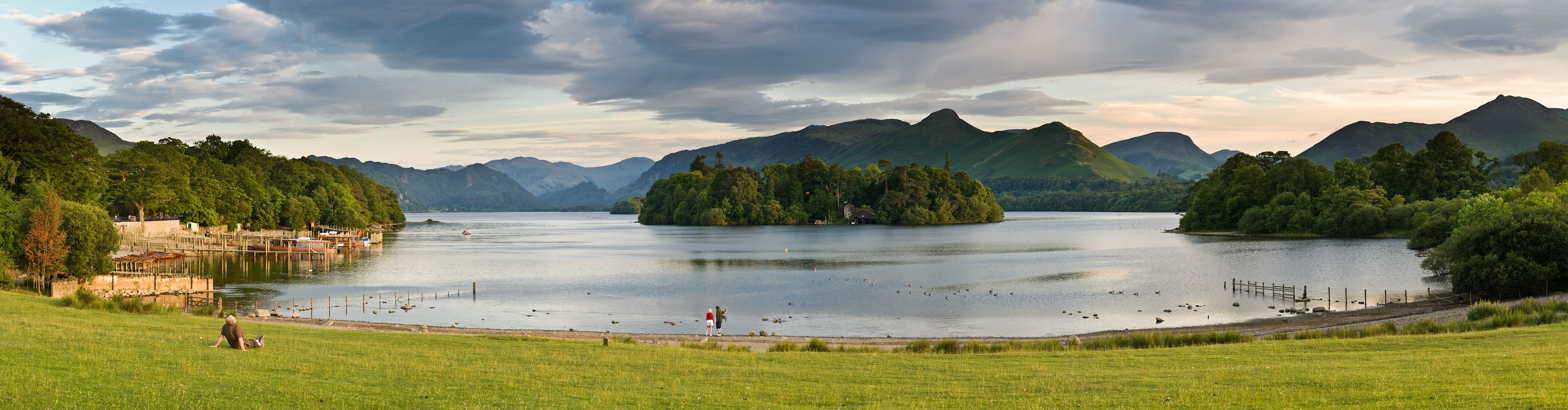
Derwent Water, one of 21 large water bodies in the Lake District

Major lakes shown within the National Park

Only one of the lakes in the Lake District is called by that name, Bassenthwaite Lake. All the others such as Windermere, Coniston Water, Ullswater and Buttermere are meres, tarns and waters, with mere being the least common and water being the most common. The major lakes and reservoirs in the National Park are given below.

| Lake | Area (km^{2}) | Volume (million m^{3}) |
|---|---|---|
| Bassenthwaite Lake | 5.3 | 27.7 |
| Brotherswater | 0.19 | 1.2 |
| Buttermere | 0.9 | 15.1 |
| Coniston Water | 4.9 | 113.4 |
| Crummock Water | 2.5 | 66.7 |
| Derwent Water | 5.4 | 29.1 |
| Devoke Water | 0.34 | 1.89 |
| Elter Water | 0.16 | 0.5 |
| Ennerdale Water | 3.0 | 53.5 |
| Esthwaite Water | 1.0 | 6.2 |
| Grasmere | 0.6 | 4.7 |
| Haweswater | 3.9 | 88.8 |
| Hayeswater | 0.16 | 0.30 |
| Loweswater | 0.6 | 5.0 |
| Rydal Water | 0.3 | 1.6 |
| Thirlmere | 3.3 | 50.4 |
| Ullswater | 8.9 | 219.7 |
| Wastwater | 2.9 | 110.4 |
| Windermere | 14.8 | 314.3 |

=== Woodlands ===
Below the tree line are wooded areas, including British and European native oak woodlands and introduced softwood plantations. The woodlands provide habitats for native English wildlife. The native red squirrel is found in the Lake District and a few other parts of England. In parts of the Lake District, the rainfall is higher than in any other part of England. This gives Atlantic mosses, ferns, lichen, and liverworts the chance to grow. There is some ancient woodland in the National Park. Management of the woodlands varies: some are coppiced, some pollarded, some left to grow naturally, and some provide grazing and shelter.

=== Coast ===
The Lake District extends to the coast of the Irish Sea from Drigg in the north to Silecroft in the south, encompassing the estuaries of the Esk and its tributaries, the Irt and the Mite. The intertidal zone of the combined estuaries includes sand, shingle and mudflats, and saltmarsh. The dune systems on either side of the estuary are protected as nature reserves; Drigg Dunes and Gullery to the north and Eskmeals Dunes to the south. South of the estuary, the coast is formed in low cliffs of glacial till, sands, and gravels.

The district also extends to the tidal waters of Morecambe Bay and several of its estuaries alongside the Furness and Cartmel Peninsulas, designated on M6 motorway signposts as the "Lake District Peninsulas", and the southern portions of which lie outside the park. These are the Duddon Estuary, the Leven Estuary, and the western banks and tidal flats of the Kent Estuary. These areas are each characterised by sand and mudflats of scenic and wildlife interest. The coast is backed by extensive flats of raised marine deposits left when the relative sea level was higher.

== Geology ==
Geological map of the Lake District showing the main structures and areas of mineralisation

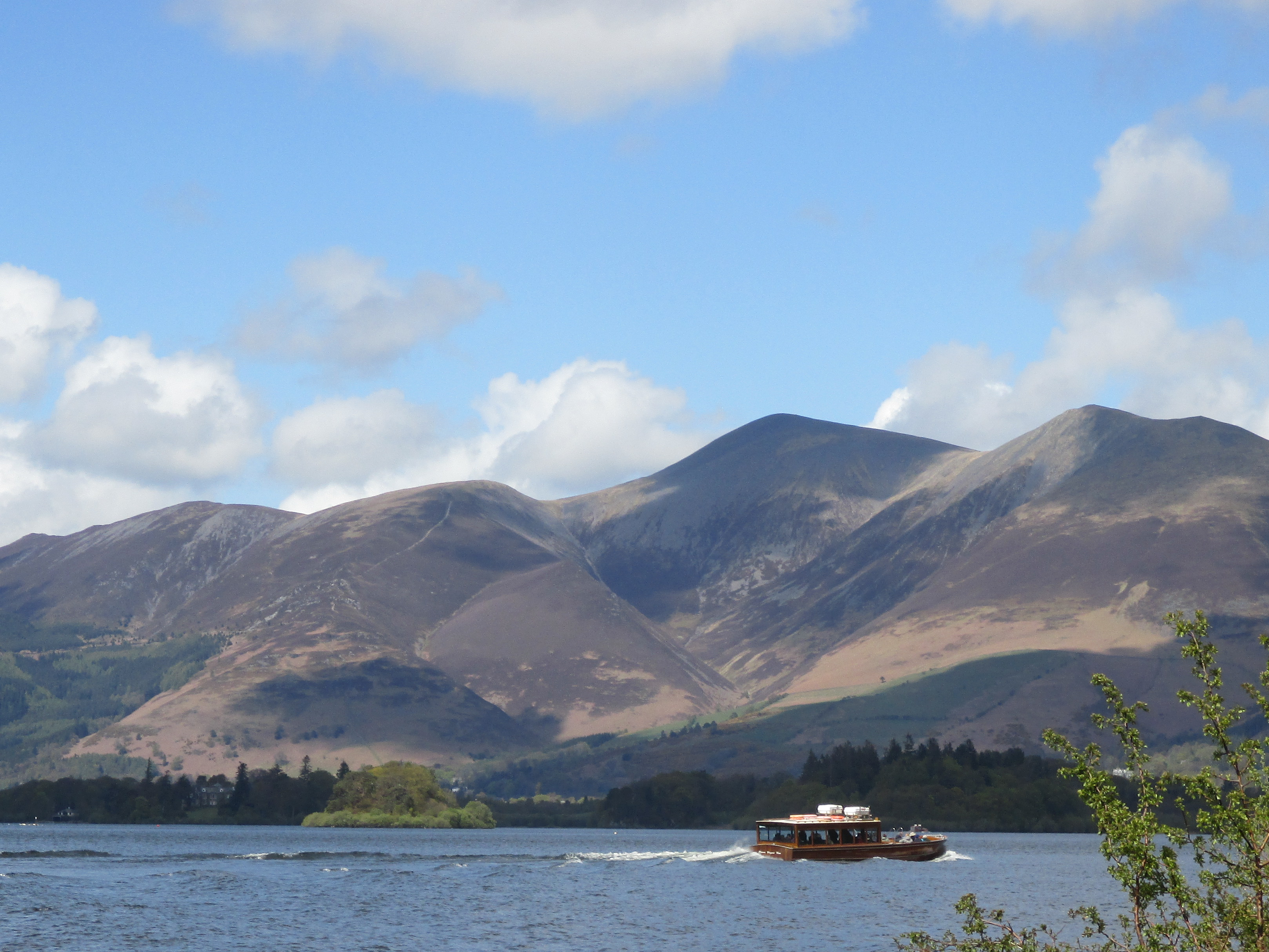
Skiddaw seen from Derwentwater

The Lake District's geology is very complex but well-studied. A granite batholith beneath the area is responsible for this upland massif, its relatively low density causing the area to be "buoyed up". The granite can be seen at the surface as the Ennerdale, Skiddaw, Carrock Fell, Eskdale, and Shap granites.

Broadly speaking the area can be divided into three bands, divisions which run southwest to the northeast. Generally speaking, the rocks become younger from the northwest to the southeast. The northwestern band is composed of early to mid-Ordovician sedimentary rocks, largely mudstones and siltstones of marine origin. Together they comprise the Skiddaw Group and include the rocks traditionally known as the Skiddaw Slates. Their friability generally leads to mountains with relatively smooth slopes such as Skiddaw itself.

The central band is a mix of volcanic and sedimentary rocks of mid-to-late Ordovician age comprising the lavas and tuffs of the Borrowdale Volcanic Group, erupted as the former Iapetus Ocean was subducted beneath what is now the Scottish border during the Caledonian orogeny. The northern central peaks, such as Great Rigg, were produced by considerable lava flows. These lava eruptions were followed by a series of pyroclastic eruptions which produced a series of calderas, one of which includes present-day Scafell Pike. These pyroclastic rocks give rise to the craggy landscapes typical of the central fells.

The southeastern band comprises the mudstones and wackes of the Windermere Supergroup and which includes (successively) the rocks of the Dent, Stockdale, Tranearth, Coniston, and Kendal groups. These are generally a little less resistant to erosion than the sequence of the rock to the north and underlie much of the lower landscapes around Coniston and Windermere.

Later intrusions have formed individual outcrops of igneous rock in each of these groups. Around the edges of these Ordovician and Silurian rocks on the northern, eastern, and southern fringes of the area is a semi-continuous outcrop of Carboniferous Limestone seen most spectacularly at places like Whitbarrow Scar and Scout Scar.

== Climate ==
The Lake District's location on the northwest coast of England, coupled with its mountainous geography, makes it the wettest part of England. The UK Met Office reports average annual precipitation of more than 2,000 mm (80 in), but with considerable local variation.

Although the entire region receives above-average rainfall, there is a wide disparity between the amounts of rainfall in the western and eastern lakes, as the Lake District experiences relief rainfall. Seathwaite, Borrowdale is the wettest inhabited place in England with an average of 3,300 mm (130 in) of rain a year, while nearby Sprinkling Tarn is even wetter, recording over 5,000 mm (200 in) per year; by contrast, Keswick, at the lower end of Borrowdale, receives 1,470 mm (58 in) every year, and Penrith (just outside the Lake District) only 870 mm (34 in). March to June tend to be the driest months, with October to January the wettest, but at low levels, there is relatively little difference between months.

Although there are gales in the sheltered valleys on only five days a year on average, the Lake District is generally very windy: the coastal areas have 20 days of gales, and the fell tops around 100 days of gales per year. The maritime climate means that the Lake District has relatively moderate temperature variations throughout the year. The mean temperature in the valleys ranges from about 3 °C (37 °F) in January to around 15 °C (59 °F) in July. (By comparison, Moscow, at the same latitude, ranges from −10 to 19 °C (14 to 66 °F).)

The relatively low height of most of the fells means that, while snow is expected during the winter, they can be free of snow at any time of the year. Normally, significant snowfall only occurs between November and April. On average, snow falls on Helvellyn 67 days per year. Snow typically falls on 20 days of the year in the valleys, with a further 200 days with some rain, and 145 completely dry days. Hill fog is common at any time of year, and the fells average only around 2.5 hours of sunshine per day, increasing to around 4.1 hours per day on the coastal plains.

Climate data for Keswick, Lake District (1991–2020 averages)
| Month | Jan | Feb | Mar | Apr | May | Jun | Jul | Aug | Sep | Oct | Nov | Dec | Year |
|---|---|---|---|---|---|---|---|---|---|---|---|---|---|
| Mean daily maximum °C (°F) | 7.4 (45.3) | 7.8 (46.0) | 9.7 (49.5) | 12.4 (54.3) | 15.8 (60.4) | 18.2 (64.8) | 19.8 (67.6) | 19.2 (66.6) | 17.0 (62.6) | 13.5 (56.3) | 10.0 (50.0) | 7.8 (46.0) | 13.2 (55.8) |
| Daily mean °C (°F) | 4.7 (40.5) | 4.8 (40.6) | 6.3 (43.3) | 8.4 (47.1) | 11.3 (52.3) | 14.0 (57.2) | 15.7 (60.3) | 15.3 (59.5) | 13.2 (55.8) | 10.2 (50.4) | 7.1 (44.8) | 4.9 (40.8) | 9.7 (49.4) |
| Mean daily minimum °C (°F) | 2.0 (35.6) | 1.8 (35.2) | 2.8 (37.0) | 4.4 (39.9) | 6.8 (44.2) | 9.7 (49.5) | 11.6 (52.9) | 11.4 (52.5) | 9.4 (48.9) | 6.8 (44.2) | 4.2 (39.6) | 1.9 (35.4) | 6.1 (43.0) |
| Average precipitation mm (inches) | 172.5 (6.79) | 135.4 (5.33) | 114.9 (4.52) | 82.8 (3.26) | 81.6 (3.21) | 89.9 (3.54) | 94.9 (3.74) | 120.2 (4.73) | 124.4 (4.90) | 175.0 (6.89) | 188.6 (7.43) | 195.2 (7.69) | 1,575.4 (62.03) |
| Average precipitation days (≥ 1 mm) | 16.8 | 14.3 | 14.1 | 12.5 | 12.4 | 12.7 | 13.5 | 15.2 | 13.5 | 17.0 | 18.2 | 17.8 | 178 |
Source: UK Met Office

== Wildlife ==
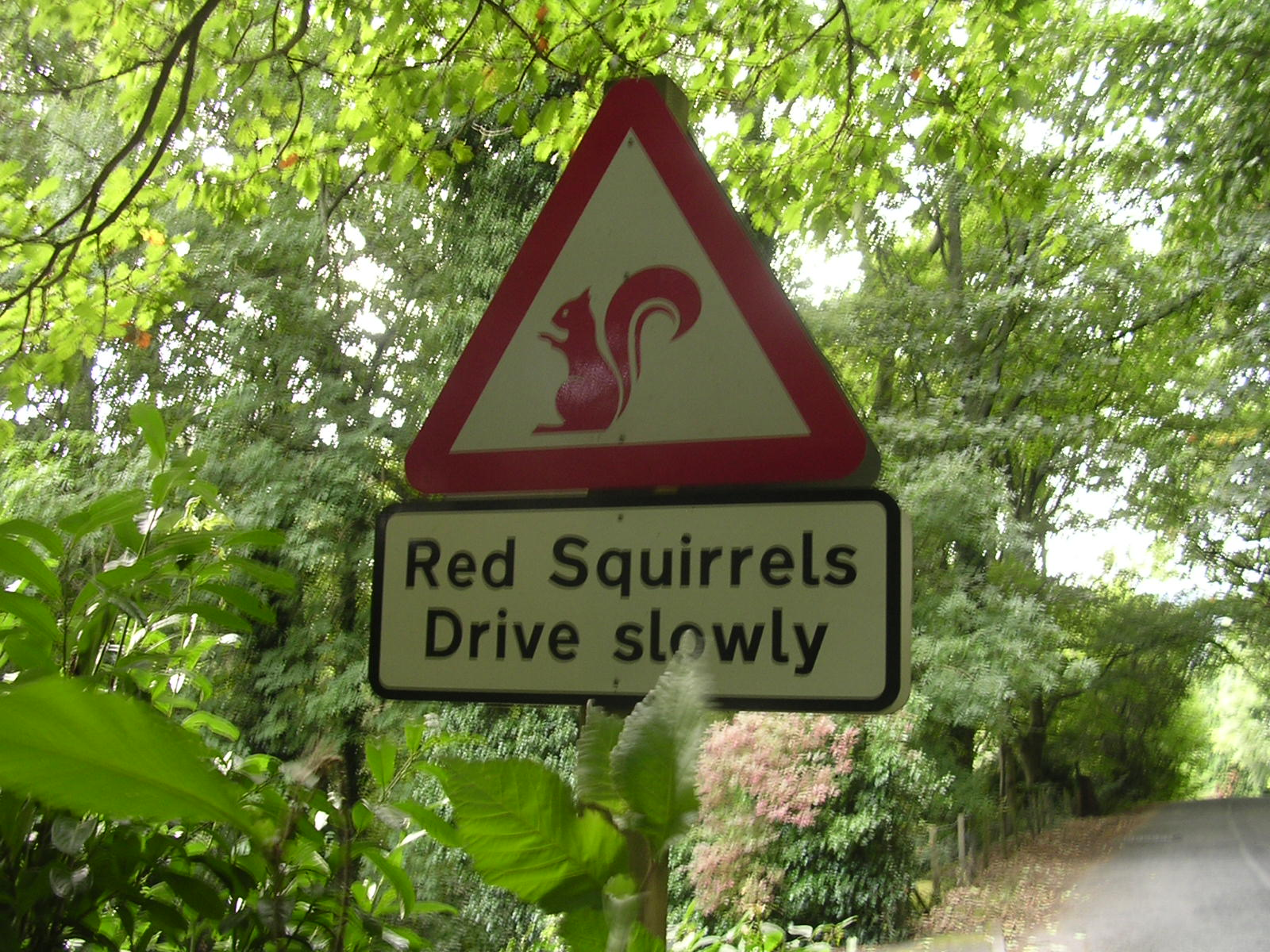
Road warning signals for red squirrels; the Lake District is one of the few places in England where red squirrels have a sizeable population.

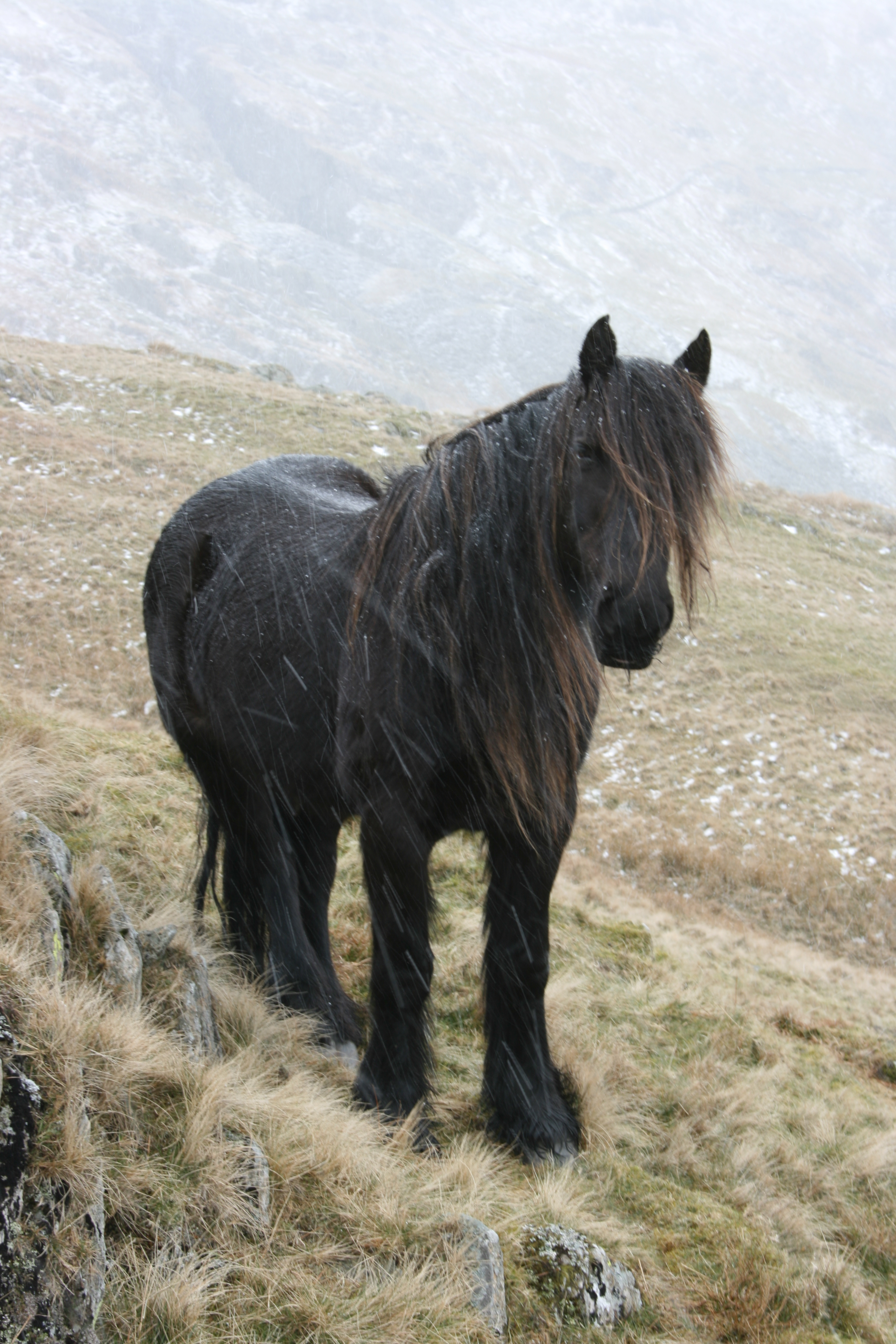
A Fell pony on the fells, native to North West England

The Lake District is home to a great variety of wildlife, because of its varied topography, lakes, and forests. It provides a home for the red squirrel and colonies of sundew and butterwort, two of the few carnivorous plants native to Britain. The Lake District is a major sanctuary for the red squirrel and has the largest population in England (out of the estimated 140,000 red squirrels in the United Kingdom, compared with about 2.5 million grey squirrels).

The Lake District is home to a range of bird species, and the RSPB maintain a reserve in Haweswater. England's last nesting pair of golden eagles was found in the Lake District; the female was last seen in 2004 and the male was last seen in 2015. Following recolonisation attempts, a pair of ospreys nested in the Lake District for the first time in over 150 years near Bassenthwaite Lake during 2001. Ospreys now frequently migrate north from Africa in the spring to nest in the Lake District, and a total of 23 chicks have fledged in the area since 2001. Another raptor that has had recolonisation attempts is the red kite which, as of 2012, has a population of approximately 90 in the dense forest areas near Grizedale and successfully bred in 2014, the first breeding success in Cumbria in over 200 years. Conservationists hope the reintroduction will create a large population in the Lake District and in North West England where red kite numbers are low. Other bird species resident to the Lake District include the buzzard, dipper, peregrine and common raven. Seasonal birds include the ring ouzel and the common redstart.

The lakes of the Lake District support three rare and endangered species of fish. The vendace is found only in Derwent Water and, until 2008, Bassenthwaite Lake. Vendace have struggled in recent years with naturally occurring algae becoming a threat and the lakes gradually getting warmer. Vendace have been moved to higher lakes on a number of occasions to preserve the species, notably in 2005 and 2011. The Lakes are also home to two other rare species: the schelly, which lives in Brothers Water, Haweswater, Red Tarn and Ullswater, and the Arctic charr, which can be found in Buttermere, Coniston Water, Crummock Water, Ennerdale Water, Haweswater, Loweswater, Thirlmere, Wast Water, and Windermere.

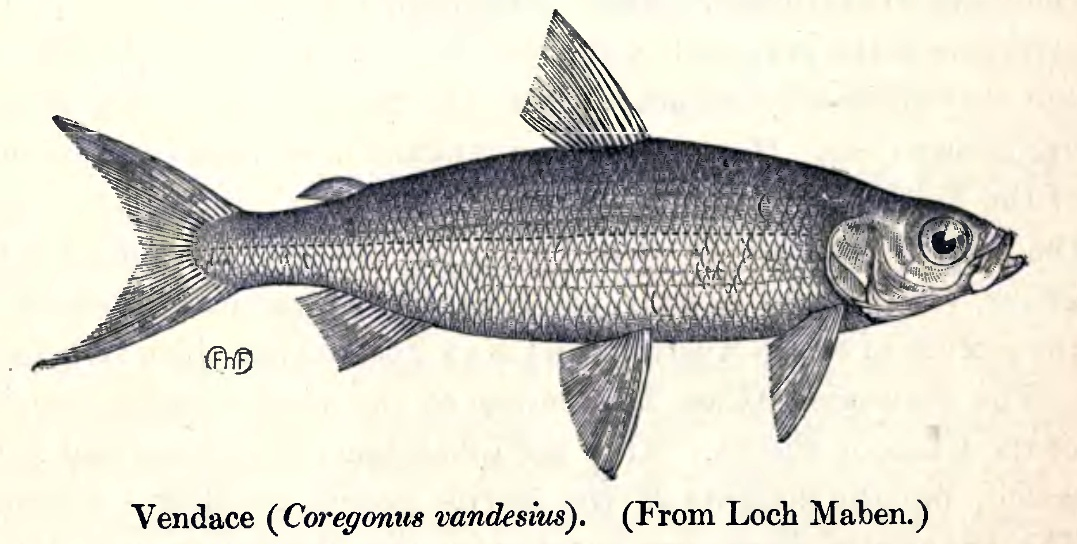
The vendace (Coregonus vandesius) is England's rarest species of fish, and is found only in the Lake District.

In recent years, important changes have been made to fisheries byelaws covering the northwest region of England, to help protect some of the rarest fish species. In 2002, the Environment Agency introduced a new fisheries byelaw, banning the use of all freshwater fish as live or dead bait in 14 of the lakes in the Lake District: Bassenthwaite Lake, Brothers Water, Buttermere, Coniston Water, Crummock Water, Derwent Water, Ennerdale Water, Haweswater, Loweswater, Red Tarn, Thirlmere, Ullswater, Wast Water, and Windermere. Anglers not complying with the new byelaw can face fines of up to £2,500.

The lakes and waters of the Lake District do not naturally support as many species of fish as other similar habitats in the south of the country and elsewhere in Europe. Some fish that do thrive there are particularly at risk from the introduction of new species. The introduction of non-native fish can lead to the predation of the native fish fauna or competition for food. There is also the risk of disease being introduced, which can further threaten native populations. In some cases, the introduced species can disturb the environment so much that it becomes unsuitable for particular fish. For example, a major problem has been found with ruffe. This non-native fish has now been introduced into several lakes in recent years. It is known that ruffe eats the eggs of vendace, which are particularly vulnerable because of their long incubation period. This means that they are susceptible to predators for up to 120 days. The eggs of other fish, for example roach, are only at risk for as little as three days.

The Lake District supports a distinctive montane lichen flora, with over 55 species recorded from high-level areas. Whilst less diverse than the Scottish Highlands, the region contains several rare species, particularly in areas of base-rich rock. Brown Cove Tarn is of international importance, hosting several species that are rare throughout Europe. The Helvellyn range is particularly significant, with Brown Cove containing the richest lichen assemblages. Key species include Umbilicaria crustulosa, which was first discovered in Langdale in 1889. The area's lichen communities have been impacted by heavy sheep grazing since the 14th century, resulting in less extensive mats than those found in the Scottish Highlands. The wet climate, with annual precipitation exceeding 4000mm in central areas, combined with acidic rock and intensive grazing, creates challenging conditions for lichen growth. However, some species persist in sheltered locations, particularly in gullies and on boulders around tarns, where they form distinct zonation patterns related to water levels and exposure.

== Economy ==
=== Agriculture and forestry ===
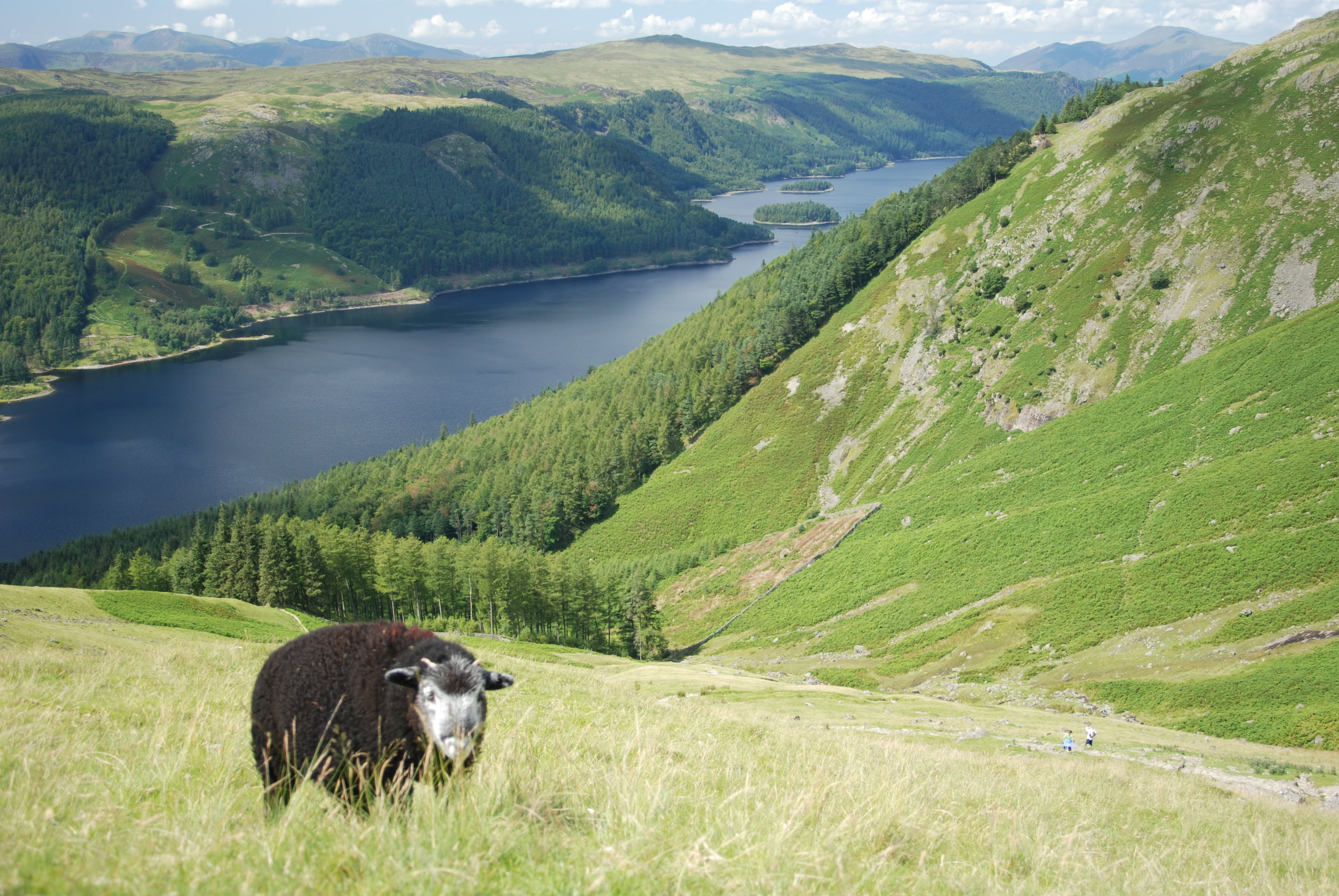
A young Herdwick grazing above Thirlmere. Older sheep of this breed are grey or white.

Farming, and in particular sheep farming, has been the major industry in the region since Roman times. The breed most closely associated with the area is the tough Herdwick, with Rough Fell and Swaledale sheep also common. Sheep farming remains important both for the economy of the region and for preserving the landscape which visitors want to see. Features such as dry stone walls, for example, are there as a result of sheep farming. Some land is also used for silage and dairy farming.

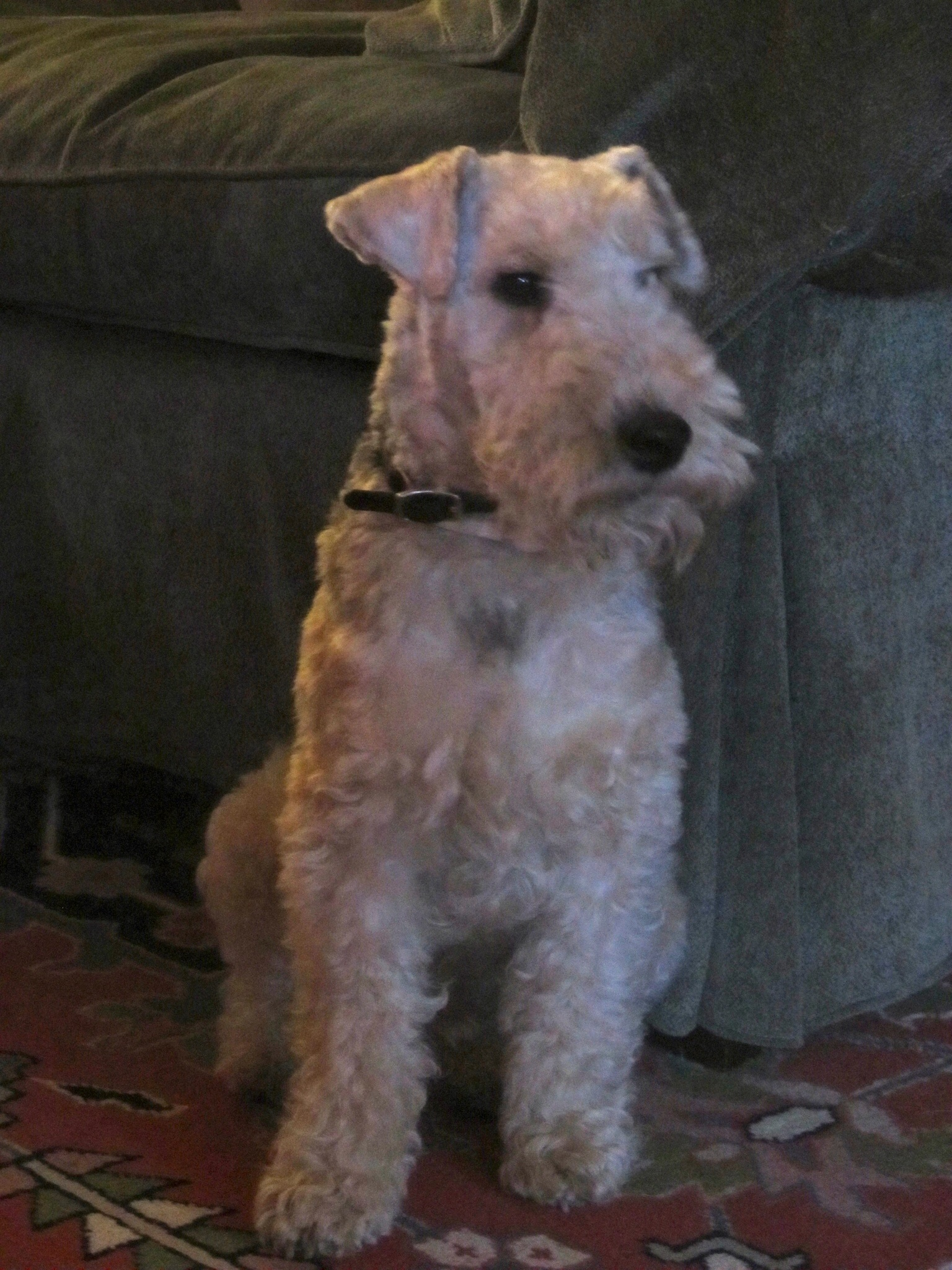
The Lakeland Terrier is a District namesake, and native of the area's farms.

The area was badly affected by the outbreak of foot-and-mouth disease across the United Kingdom in 2001. The outbreak started in Surrey in February but had spread to Cumbria by end of March. Thousands of sheep, including the native Herdwicks which graze on the fellsides across the district, were destroyed. In replacing the sheep, one problem to overcome was that many of the lost sheep were heafed, that is, they knew their part of the unfenced fell and did not stray, with this knowledge being passed between generations. With all the sheep lost at once, this knowledge has to be relearnt and some of the fells have had discreet electric fences strung across them for a period of five years, to allow the sheep to "re-heaf". At the time of the outbreak, worries existed about the future of certain species of sheep such as Ryeland and Herdwick in the district, however these fears have been allayed and sheep now occupy the district in abundance.

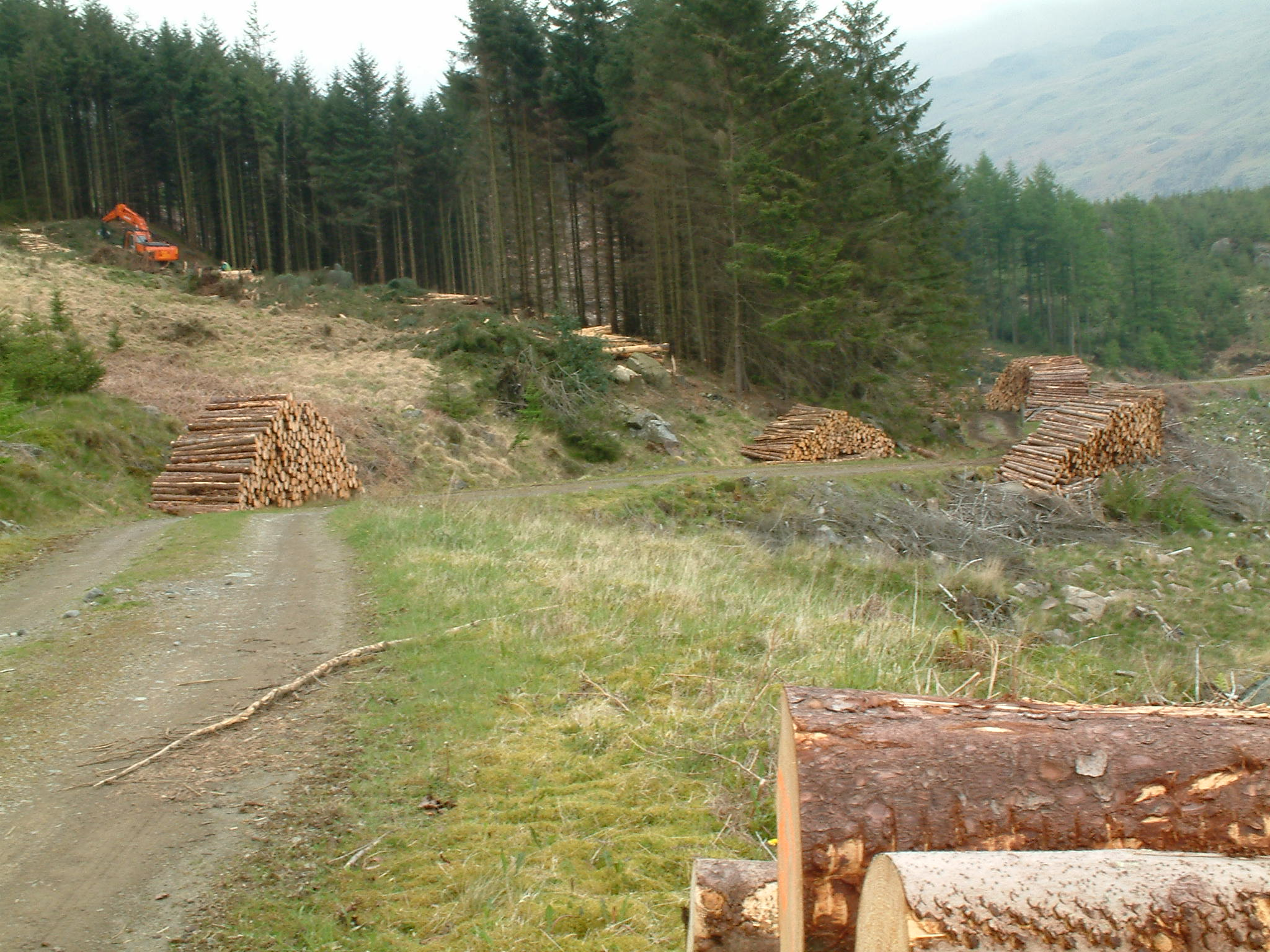
Forestry operations on Harter Fell

Forestry has also assumed greater importance over the last century with the establishment of extensive conifer plantations around Whinlatter Pass, in Ennerdale, and at Grizedale Forest among other places. There are extensive plantations of non-native pine trees.

=== Industry ===
With its wealth of rock types and their abundance in the landscape, mining and quarrying have long been significant activities in the Lake District economy. In Neolithic times, the Lake District was a major source of stone axes, examples of which have been found all over Britain. The primary site, on the slopes of the Langdale Pikes, is sometimes described as a "stone axe factory" of the Langdale axe industry. Some of the earliest stone circles in Britain are connected with this industry.

Mining, particularly of copper, lead (often associated with quantities of silver), baryte, graphite, and slate, was historically a major Lakeland industry, mainly from the 16th to 19th centuries. Coppiced woodland was used extensively to provide charcoal for smelting. Some mining still takes place today; for example, slate mining continues at the Honister Mines, at the top of Honister Pass. Abandoned mine workings can be found on fellsides throughout the district. The locally mined graphite led to the development of the pencil industry, especially around Keswick.

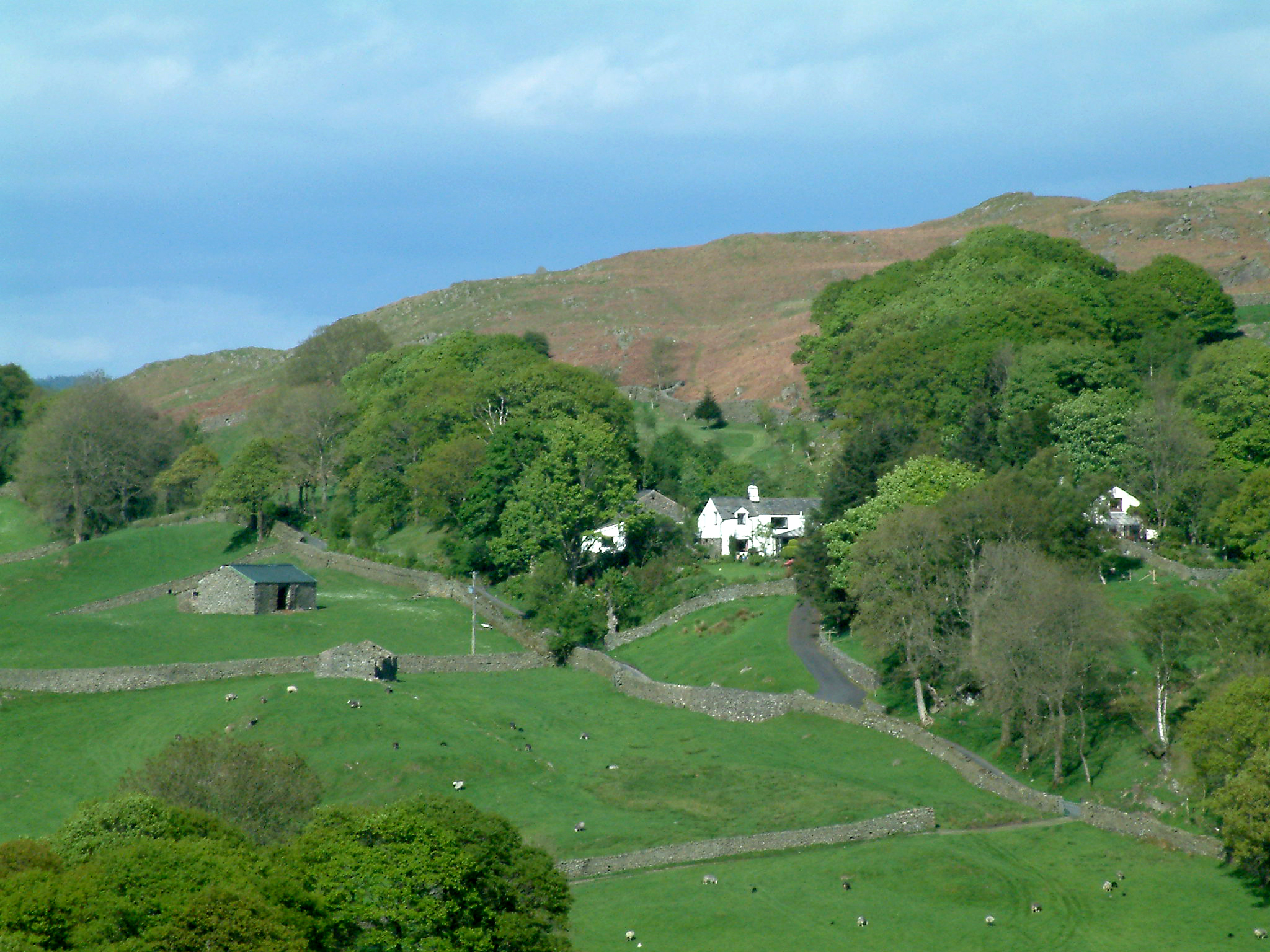
A typical Lake District scene

In the middle of the 19th century, half the world textile industry's bobbin supply came from the Lake District area. Over the past century, however, tourism has grown rapidly to become the area's primary source of income.

=== Development of tourism ===
==== Historical ====
Early visitors to the Lake District, who travelled for education and for the pleasure of the journey, include Celia Fiennes, who in 1698 undertook a journey the length of England, including riding through Kendal and over Kirkstone Pass into Patterdale. Her experiences and impressions were published in her book Great Journey to Newcastle and Cornwall:

As I walked down at this place I was walled on both sides by those inaccessible high rocky barren hills which hang over one's head in some places and appear very terrible; and from them springs many little currents of water from the sides and clefts which trickle down to some lower part where it runs swiftly over the stones and shelves in the way, which makes a pleasant rush and murmuring noise and like a snowball is increased by each spring trickling down on either side of those hills, and so descends into the bottoms which are a Moorish ground in which in many places the waters stand, and so form some of those Lakes as it did here.

In 1724, Daniel Defoe published the first volume of A Tour Thro' the Whole Island of Great Britain. He commented on Westmorland that it was:

the wildest, most barren and frightful of any that I have passed over in England, or even Wales itself; the west side, which borders on Cumberland, is indeed bounded by a chain of almost unpassable mountains which, in the language of the country, are called fells.

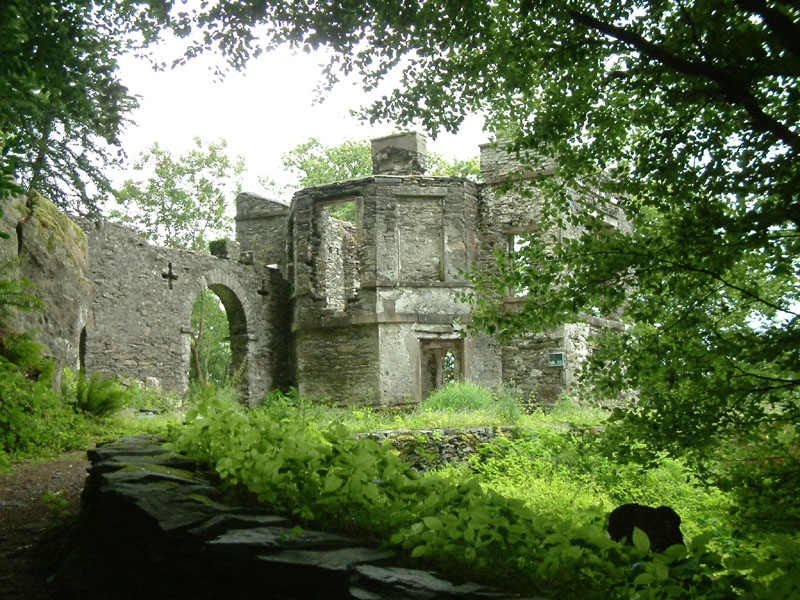
Claife Station on the western shore of Windermere

Towards the end of the 18th century, the area was becoming more popular with travellers. This was partly a result of wars in Continental Europe, restricting the possibility of travel there. In 1778 Thomas West produced A Guide to the Lakes, which began the era of modern tourism. West listed "stations", viewpoints where tourists could enjoy the best views of the landscape, being encouraged to appreciate the formal qualities of the landscape and to apply aesthetic values. At some of these stations, buildings were erected to help this process. The remains of Claife Station (on the western shore Windermere below Claife Heights) can be visited today.

William Wordsworth published his Guide to the Lakes in 1810, and by 1835 it had reached its fifth edition, now called A Guide Through the District of the Lakes in the North of England. This book was particularly influential in popularising the region. Wordsworth's favourite valley was Dunnerdale or the Duddon Valley in the southwest of the Lake District.

The railways led to another expansion in tourism. The Kendal and Windermere Railway was the first to penetrate the Lake District, reaching Kendal in 1846 and Windermere in 1847. The line to Coniston opened in 1848 (although until 1857 this was only linked to the national network by ferries between Fleetwood and Barrow-in-Furness); the line from Penrith through Keswick to Cockermouth in 1865; and the line to Lakeside at the foot of Windermere in 1869. The railways, built with traditional industry in mind, brought with them a huge increase in the number of visitors, thus contributing to the growth of the tourism industry. Railway services were supplemented by steamer boats on the major lakes of Ullswater, Windermere, Coniston Water, and Derwent Water.

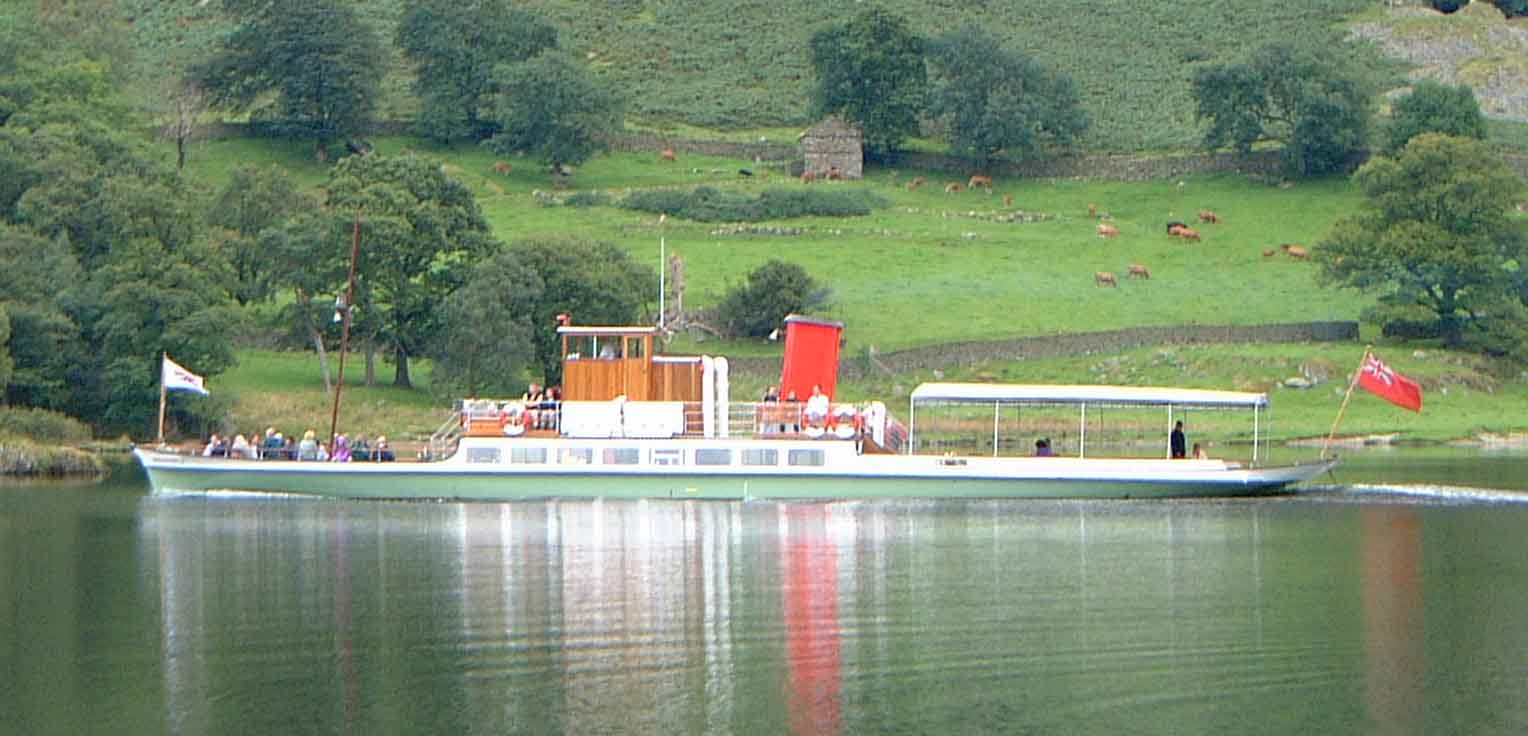
A steamer on Ullswater

The growth in tourist numbers continued into the age of the motor car, when railways began to be closed or run down. The formation of the Lake District National Park in 1951 recognised the need to protect the Lake District environment from excessive commercial or industrial exploitation, preserving that which visitors come to see, without any restriction on the movement of people into and around the district. The M6 Motorway helped bring traffic to the Lake District, passing up its eastern flank.

==== Recent ====
The narrow roads present a challenge for traffic flow, and since the 1960s certain areas have been very congested. This problem continues, with traffic congestion and parking problems in the towns and villages. Bowness-on-Windermere addressed the parking issue with a new car park at the edge of the community and by extending an existing car park. The Lake District NP publishes a list and map of car parks within its area, allowing tourists to plan their visits accordingly.

Whilst the roads and railways provided easier access to the area, many people were drawn to Lakeland by the publication of the Pictorial Guide to the Lakeland Fells by Alfred Wainwright. First published between 1955 and 1966, these books provided detailed information on 214 fells across the region, with carefully hand-drawn maps and panoramas, and also stories and asides which add to the colour of the area. They are still used by many visitors to the area as guides for walking excursions, with the ultimate goal of bagging the complete list of Wainwrights. The famous guides were revised by Chris Jesty between 2005 and 2009 to reflect changes, mainly in valley access and paths, and are currently being revised by Clive Hutchby, the author of The Wainwright Companion. The first of the revised volumes, Book One: The Eastern Fells, was published in March 2015; the most recent, Book Six: The North Western Fells, was published in April 2019.

Since the early 1960s, the National Park Authority has employed rangers to help cope with increasing tourism and development, the first being John Wyatt, who has since written several guide books. He was joined two years later by a second, and since then the number of rangers has been rising.

The area has also become associated with the writer Beatrix Potter. Several tourists visit to see her family home, with particularly large numbers coming from Japan.

Tourism has now become the park's major industry, with about 12 million visitors each year, mainly from the rest of the UK and from China, Japan, Spain, Germany, and the US. Windermere Lake Steamers are Cumbria's most popular charging tourist attraction, with about 1.35 million paying passengers each year, and the local economy is dependent upon tourists. The negative impact of tourism has been seen, however. Soil erosion, caused by walking, is now a significant problem, with millions of pounds being spent to protect overused paths. In 2006, two tourist information centres in the National Park were closed.

Cycling is now popular in the Lake District National Park. A number of long-distance cycle routes go through the Lake District, including coast to coast cycle routes such as the C2C, Hadrian's Cycleway, the Reivers Route and the Walney to Wear route. Several towns have also become hubs for road-cycling holidays and cycle touring, such as Keswick and Ambleside. Mountain bikers use the trails constructed at Whinlatter Forest and Grizedale Forest and also have wilder routes available on bridleways.

Cultural tourism is becoming an increasingly important part of the wider tourist industry. The Lake District's links with a wealth of artists and writers and its strong history of providing summer theatre performances in the old Blue Box of Century Theatre are strong attractions for visiting tourists. The tradition of theatre is carried on at venues such as Theatre by the Lake in Keswick with its summer season of six plays in repertoire, Christmas and Easter productions, and the many literature, film, mountaineering, jazz, and creative arts festivals, such as the Kendal Mountain Festival and the Keswick Mountain Festival. Two museums, The World of Beatrix Potter and Dove Cottage & The Wordsworth Museum, are also important aspects of the region.

=== Gastronomy ===
Mutton and lamb have been produced locally for generations and traditionally formed the basis of the region's many rustic dishes, such as tatie pot, a potato-topped mutton casserole. The traditional Cumberland sausage is a spiced, unlinked pork sausage with Protected Geographical Status. The Lake District now has a growing reputation for its fine dining although standard pub and café fare continues to dominate. There are eight Michelin Star restaurants within the World Heritage Site boundaries, with a further three less than five miles outside (L'Enclume, Rogan & Co, and Dog and Gun Inn). Those inside the area are: The Cottage in the Wood, Allium at Askham Hall, Old Stamp House, Forest Side, heft, The Samling, Lake Road Kitchen and SOURCE at Gilpin Hotel, one of the two restaurants at the Gilpin Hotel & Lake House. Cumbria has many microbreweries and distilleries which distribute local ales, lagers, and craft gin, vodka, and whisky to pubs and restaurants throughout the region.

== Literature and the arts ==
The Lake District has inspired creativity in many fields.

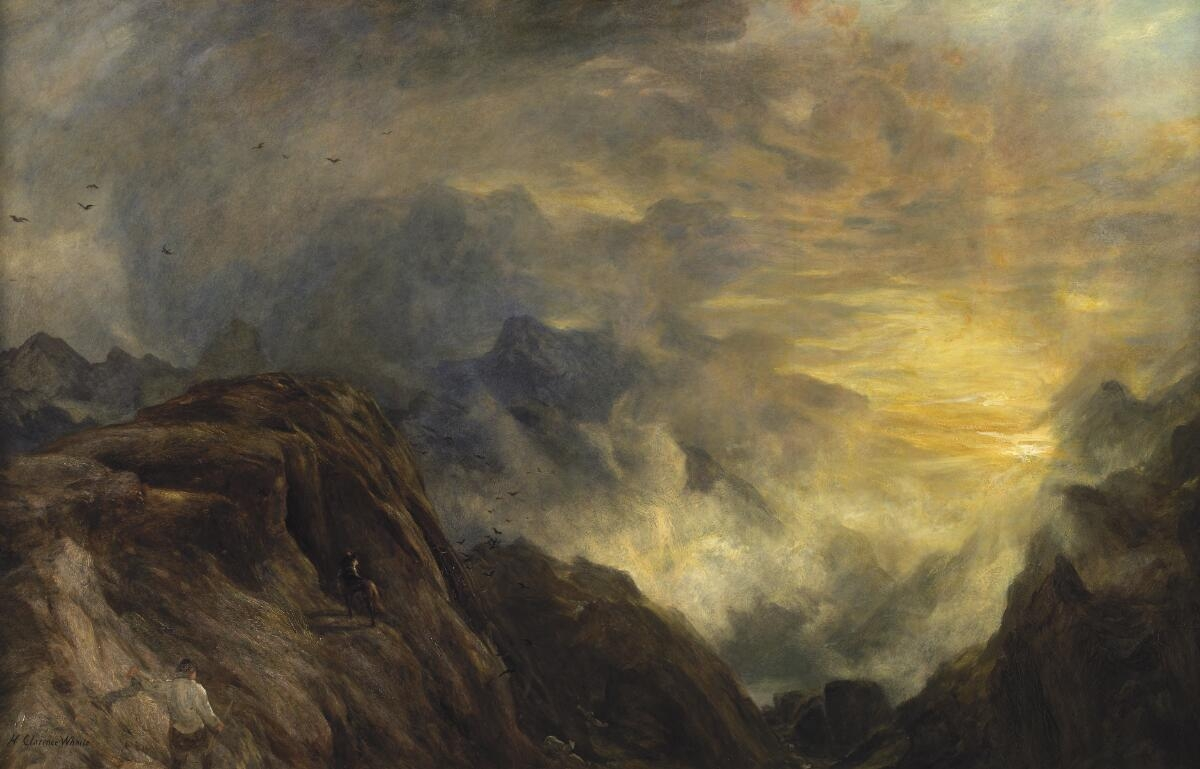
"Mountain mist, sunrise", a view in the Lake District by Henry Clarence Whaite

=== Literature ===
The District is intimately associated with English literature of the 18th and 19th centuries. Thomas Gray was the first to bring the region to attention, when he wrote a journal of his tour in 1769, but it was William Wordsworth whose poems were most famous and influential. Wordsworth's poem "I Wandered Lonely as a Cloud", inspired by the sight of daffodils on the shores of Ullswater, remains one of the most famous in the English language. Out of his long life of eighty years, sixty were spent amid its lakes and mountains, first as a schoolboy at Hawkshead, and afterward living in Grasmere (1799–1813) and Rydal Mount (1813–50). Wordsworth, Coleridge and Southey became known as the Lake Poets.

The poet and his wife are buried in the churchyard of Grasmere; very near to them are the remains of Hartley Coleridge (son of the poet Samuel Taylor Coleridge), who himself lived for many years in Keswick, Ambleside, and Grasmere. Robert Southey, the Poet Laureate and friend of Wordsworth (who would succeed Southey as Laureate in 1843), was a resident of Keswick for forty years (1803–43), and was buried in Crosthwaite churchyard. Samuel Taylor Coleridge lived for some time in Keswick, and also with the Wordsworths at Grasmere.

The Lake District is mentioned in Jane Austen's Pride and Prejudice; Elizabeth Bennet looks forward to a holiday there with her aunt and uncle and is "excessively disappointed" upon learning they cannot travel that far.

The opening of Charlotte Turner Smith's novel Ethelinde with its atmospheric description of Grasmere, complete with a Gothic abbey, is supposed to have introduced Wordsworth to it as a possible place to live.

From 1807 to 1815 John Wilson lived at Windermere. Thomas de Quincey spent the greater part of the years 1809 to 1828 at Grasmere, in the first cottage which Wordsworth had inhabited. Ambleside, or its environs, was also the place of residence both of Thomas Arnold, who spent holidays there in the last ten years of his life, and of Harriet Martineau, who built herself a house there in 1845. At Keswick, Mrs Lynn Linton (wife of William James Linton) was born in 1822. Brantwood, a house beside Coniston Water, was the home of John Ruskin during the last years of his life. His assistant W. G. Collingwood the author, artist, and antiquarian lived nearby and wrote Thorstein of the Mere, set in the Norse period.

In addition to these residents or natives of the Lake District, a variety of other poets and writers made visits to the Lake District or were bound by ties of friendship with those already mentioned above. These include Percy Bysshe Shelley, Sir Walter Scott, Nathaniel Hawthorne, Arthur Hugh Clough, Henry Crabb Robinson, "Conversation" Sharp, Thomas Carlyle, John Keats, Lord Tennyson, Charles Lutwidge Dodgson, Matthew Arnold, Felicia Hemans, Thomas Cooper (poet) and Gerald Massey.

Although it is unlikely she ever went there, Letitia Elizabeth Landon produced no fewer than sixteen poems on subjects within the Lake District and its surroundings, all associated with engravings within Fisher's Drawing Room Scrap Books, from 1832 to 1838. Also included there (1834) is Grasmere Lake (A Sketch by a Cockney), a skit on becoming a 'lakes poet'.

During the early 20th century, the children's author Beatrix Potter lived at Hill Top Farm; she set many of her famous Peter Rabbit books in the Lake District. Her life was made into a biopic film, starring Renée Zellweger and Ewan McGregor. Children's author Arthur Ransome lived in several areas of the Lake District, and set five of his Swallows and Amazons series of books, published between 1930 and 1947, in a fictionalised Lake District setting. So did Geoffrey Trease with his five Black Banner school stories (1949–56), starting with No Boats on Bannermere.

The novelist Sir Hugh Walpole lived at "Brackenburn" on the lower slopes of Catbells overlooking Derwent Water from 1924 until he died in 1941. Whilst living at "Brackenburn" he wrote The Herries Chronicle detailing the history of a fictional Cumbrian family over two centuries. The noted author and poet Norman Nicholson came from the southwest lakes, living and writing about Millom in the 20th century.

Writer and author Melvyn Bragg was brought up in the region and has used it as the setting for some of his work, such as his novel A Time to Dance, which later turned into a television drama.

The Lake District is the setting for the 1977 Richard Adams' novel The Plague Dogs. Adams' knowledge of the area offers the reader a precise view of the natural beauty of the Lake District. The story is based on a fictionalised version of the remote hill farm of Lawson Park, overlooking Coniston Water.

The Lake District has been the setting for crime novels by Reginald Hill, Val McDermid and Martin Edwards. The region is also a recurring theme in Ernest Hemingway's 1926 novella The Torrents of Spring. It is the setting for Prudence, a romantic novel by Jilly Cooper. It features prominently in Ian McEwan's Amsterdam, which won the 1998 Booker Prize. The 1996 Eisner Award winning graphic novel The Tale of One Bad Rat, by Bryan Talbot, features a young girl's journey to and subsequent stay in the Lake District. Also set in the District is Sophie Jackson's mystery novel The Woman Died Thrice. It was published in 2016 under Jackson's pen name Evelyn James.

Memoirist and nature writer James Rebanks has published several books about the Lake District, including two acclaimed books that detail his life as a sheep farmer: The Shepherd's Life: A Tale of the Lake District (2015) and English Pastoral: An Inheritance (2020).

=== Visual arts ===
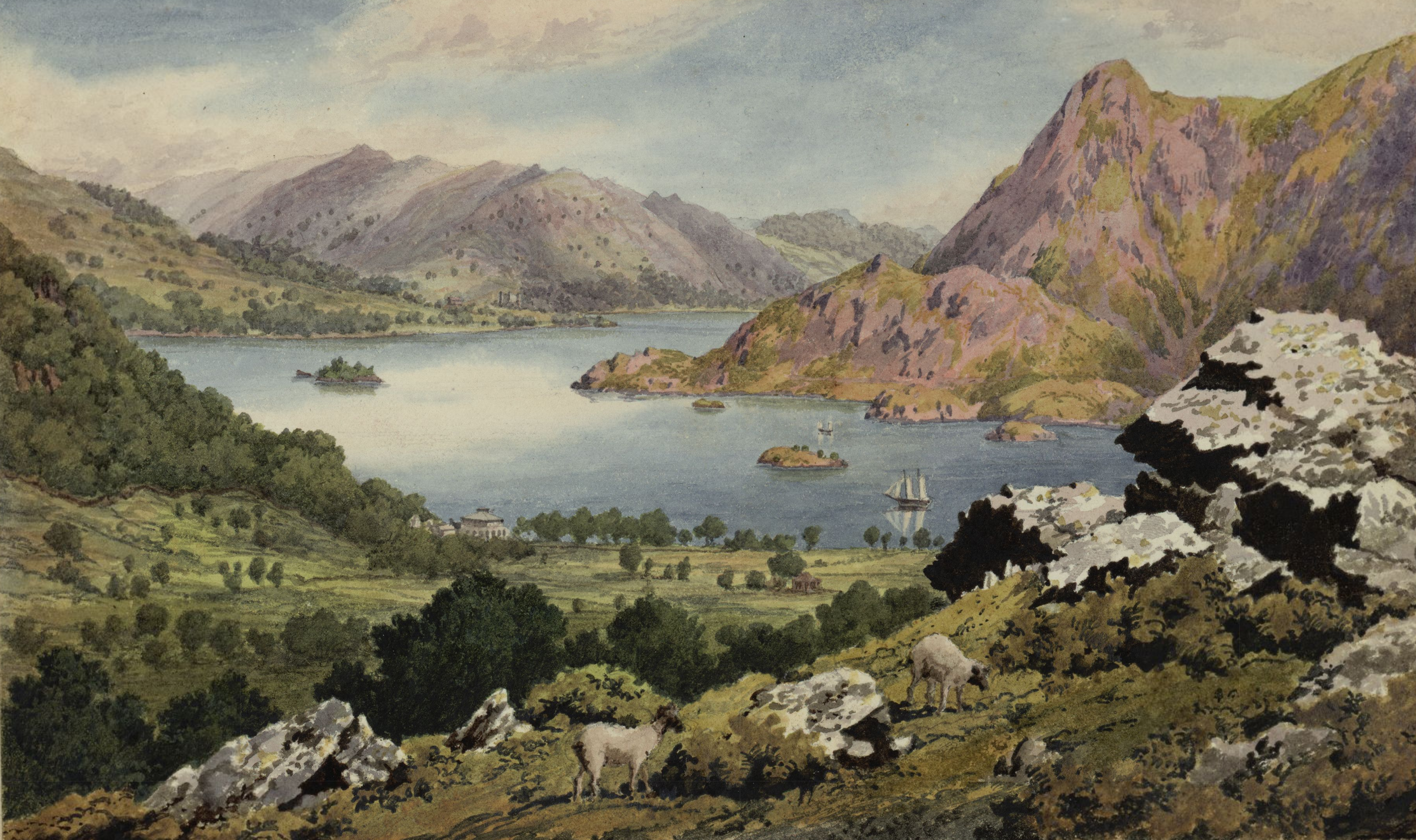
Ullswater painted by John Parker 1825

First Snow on Broughton Moor, 1890, oil painting by James Henry Crossland depicting Broughton Moor in the Lake District.

The Lakes have been an inspiration for many notable artists. Two of the most famous artists to depict the region in their work were Alfred Heaton Cooper and William Heaton Cooper. The artist James Henry Crossland (1852-1939) was known for painting landscapes of the Lake District where he lived.

The German artist Kurt Schwitters visited the Lake District while in exile in Great Britain and moved there permanently in June 1945, remaining there for the rest of his life.

Film director Ken Russell lived in the Keswick/Borrowdale area from 1975 to 2007 and used it in films such as Tommy and Mahler.

The Keswick School of Industrial Art at Keswick was started in 1884 by Canon Rawnsley, a friend of John Ruskin.

The base of contemporary art commissioner and residency base Grizedale Arts since 2007, Lawson Park now hosts artists' residencies, opens to the public on occasion, and has developed a significant garden that includes artworks alongside extensive plantings. Grizedale Arts has produced many internationally significant cultural projects and has proved instrumental in the careers of several Turner Prize–winning artists, making Laure Provoust's winning installation 'Wantee' at Lawson Park, and bringing the exhibition to Coniston's Ruskin Museum in 2013. It also supported the refurbishment of the historic Coniston Institute and developed an Honest Shop there (opening in 2012), an unstaffed shop stocking local crafts and produce.

=== Musicians ===
The English composer Sir Arthur Somervell (1863 – 1937) was born in Windermere.

The 17th track on American singer-songwriter Taylor Swift's eighth studio album, Folklore, released in 2020 as a bonus track, is titled "The Lakes", and details Swift's experience living in the Lake District. Swift makes reference to the Lake poet William Wordsworth by name.

== Nomenclature ==
Several words and phrases are local to the Lake District and are part of the Cumbrian dialect, though many are shared by other northern dialects. These include:

- Fell – from Old Norse fjallr, brought to England by Viking invaders and close to modern Norwegian fjell and Swedish fjäll meaning mountain
- Howe – place name from the Old Norse haugr meaning hill, knoll, or mound
- Tarn – a word that has been taken to mean a small lake situated in a corrie (the local name for which is cove or comb), or – more widely – a local phrase for any small pool of water. The word is derived from the Old Norse, Norwegian and Swedish word tjern/tjärn, meaning small lake.
- Yan tan tethera – the name for a system of sheep counting which was traditionally used in the Lake District. Though now rare, it is taught in local schools.
- Heaf (a variant of heft) – the "home territory" of a flock of sheep

== See also ==
- Regions of England
- Geography of the United Kingdom
- Sellafield (multi-function nuclear site)
