= Mosedale =

Mosedale may refer to:

- Mosedale, Cumbria, a hamlet in Mungrisdale parish, Eden District, Cumbria, England
- The valley of Mosedale Beck (Wast Water)
  - The Mosedale Horseshoe, classic mountain walk from Wasdale Head in this valley
- The valley of Mosedale Beck (Glenderamackin), running north from Great Dodd, Cumbria, England
  - Mosedale Viaduct on the Cockermouth, Keswick and Penrith Railway in this valley
- The valley of Mosedale Beck (Swindale), running between Branstree and Tarn Crag, Cumbria, England
- The valley which meets the River Duddon at the foot of the Hardknott Pass, Cumbria, England

== People with the name ==
- William Mosedale (1894–1971), English George Cross recipient

== See also ==
- List of Mosedale valleys and Mosedale Becks
- Mosedale Beck (disambiguation)
