= Longsleddale =

Valley and civil parish in Cumbria, England

Coordinates: 54.419°N 2.770°W

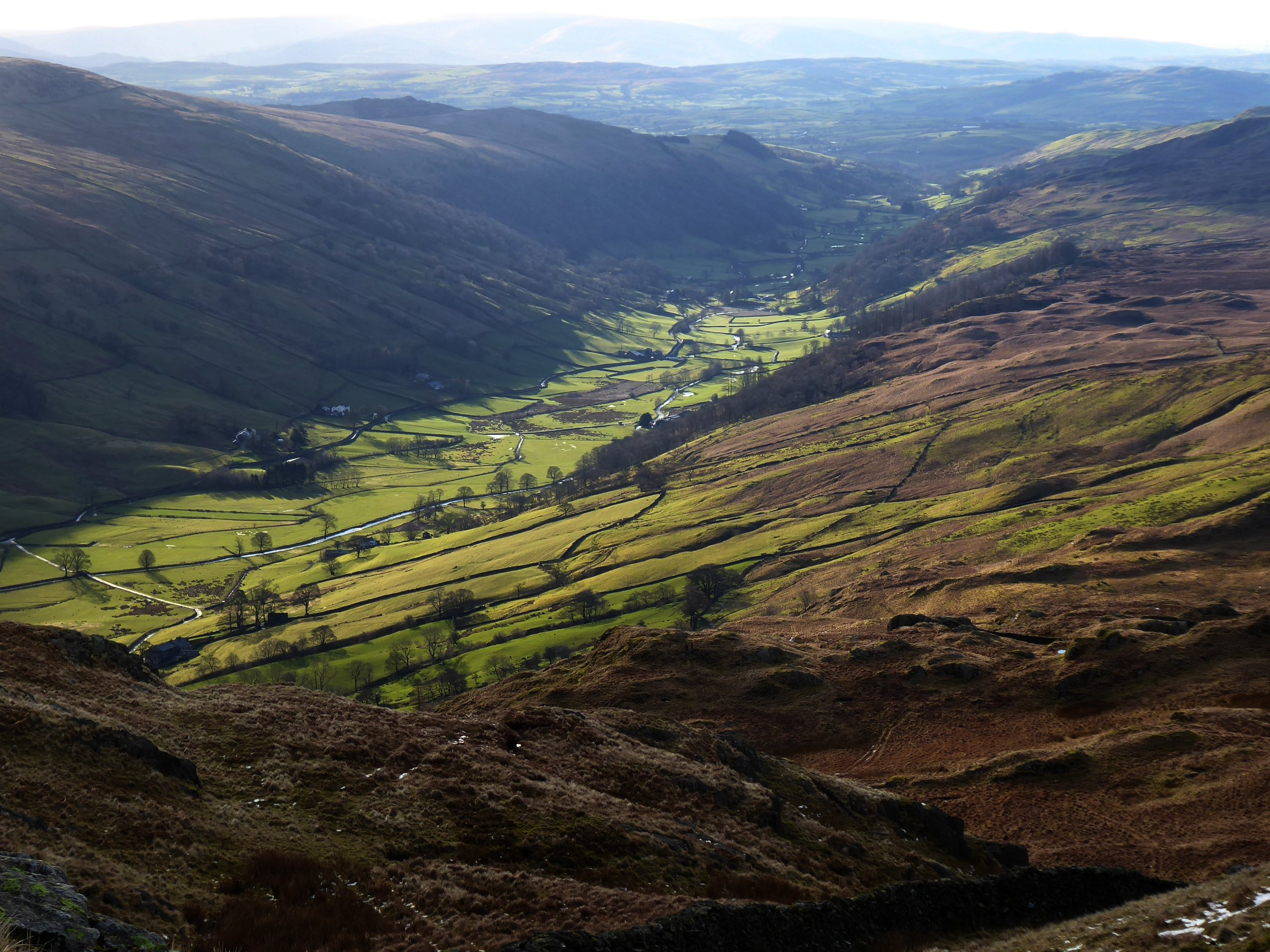
- View from Kentmere Pike looking south to the central and lower parts of Longsleddale

- Location within Cumbria
- Population: 73 (2001)
- OS grid reference: NY5003
- Civil parish: Longsleddale
- Unitary authority: Westmorland and Furness
- Ceremonial county: Cumbria
- Region: North West
- Country: England
- Sovereign state: United Kingdom
- Post town: KENDAL
- Postcode district: LA8
- Dialling code: 01539
- Police: Cumbria
- Fire: Cumbria
- Ambulance: North West
- UK Parliament: Westmorland and Lonsdale

Longsleddale (/ˈlɒŋslɛdəl/) is a valley and civil parish in the Westmorland and Furness district of Cumbria, England. It includes the hamlet of Sadgill. The parish has a population of 73. As the population taken at the 2011 Census was less than 100, details are maintained in the civil parish of Whitwell and Selside.

The valley is bounded to the west by Kentmere Pike and Shipman Knotts, one arm of the Kentmere Horseshoe, and to the east by Sleddale Fell and its summits of Grey Crag and Tarn Crag; one of several Cumbrian hills named Great Howe is on the east of the valley above Sadgill. The River Sprint starts on the slopes of Harter Fell and Branstree, and flows south through the valley before joining the River Kent to the north of the town of Kendal.

Halfway between Garnett Bridge and Sadgill, Ubarrow Hall is a mediaeval pele tower, reduced in height, adjoining a 17th-century farmhouse.

== Haweswater aqueduct ==
The Haweswater aqueduct carrying water from Haweswater Reservoir to Heaton Park Reservoir in Manchester follows the line of Longsleddale underground on the east of the valley, and crosses Stockdale Beck by a pipe bridge. Construction of the aqueduct was started in the 1930s and finally completed in 1976. Survey columns can still be seen on Branstree, Tarn Crag, and Great Howe below Grey Crag. The tunnel is about 2 m × 2 m (6 ft 7 in × 6 ft 7 in) in section, and the water flow is by gravity. Between Haweswater and Manchester the tunnel only deviates from a straight line by less than 0.6 miles (1 km).

In January 2025, United Utilities confirmed Strabag Equitix Consortium as its preferred bidder to replace and maintain six tunnel sections of the aqueduct.

== Possible railway route ==
When the directors of the Lancaster and Carlisle Railway were choosing its route in the 1840s, one possibility considered was a route through Kendal and along Longsleddale, with a 2 mi (3.2 km) tunnel under the Gatescarth Pass into Mardale and thence towards Bampton. This route had the support of the Kendal Committee of the Lancaster and Carlisle Railway; other alternatives under consideration included a line over a barrage across Morecambe Bay and round the Cumbrian coast, routes bypassing Shap to the east and west, and the Shap summit route finally chosen.

After a lengthy Parliamentary inquiry, the longer and steeper route over Shap Fell was chosen. Thomas Bouch was approached to be an adviser on the Longsleddale route and if this route had been chosen, in all probabilities Bouch would have been appointed as the civil and railway engineer. Bouch was the engineer for the Cockermouth, Keswick and Penrith Railway and rose to fame in later years, for it was his design of the Tay Railway Bridge that was destroyed in a severe storm.

The gradient of the Longsleddale route would have been somewhat less than the 1 in 70 gradient of the climb up and over Shap Fell, and the use of banking engines could have been reduced if not entirely eliminated.

It has been said that the Longsleddale route, "had it ever been built, would have been as dramatic and awe-inspiring as any in Britain".

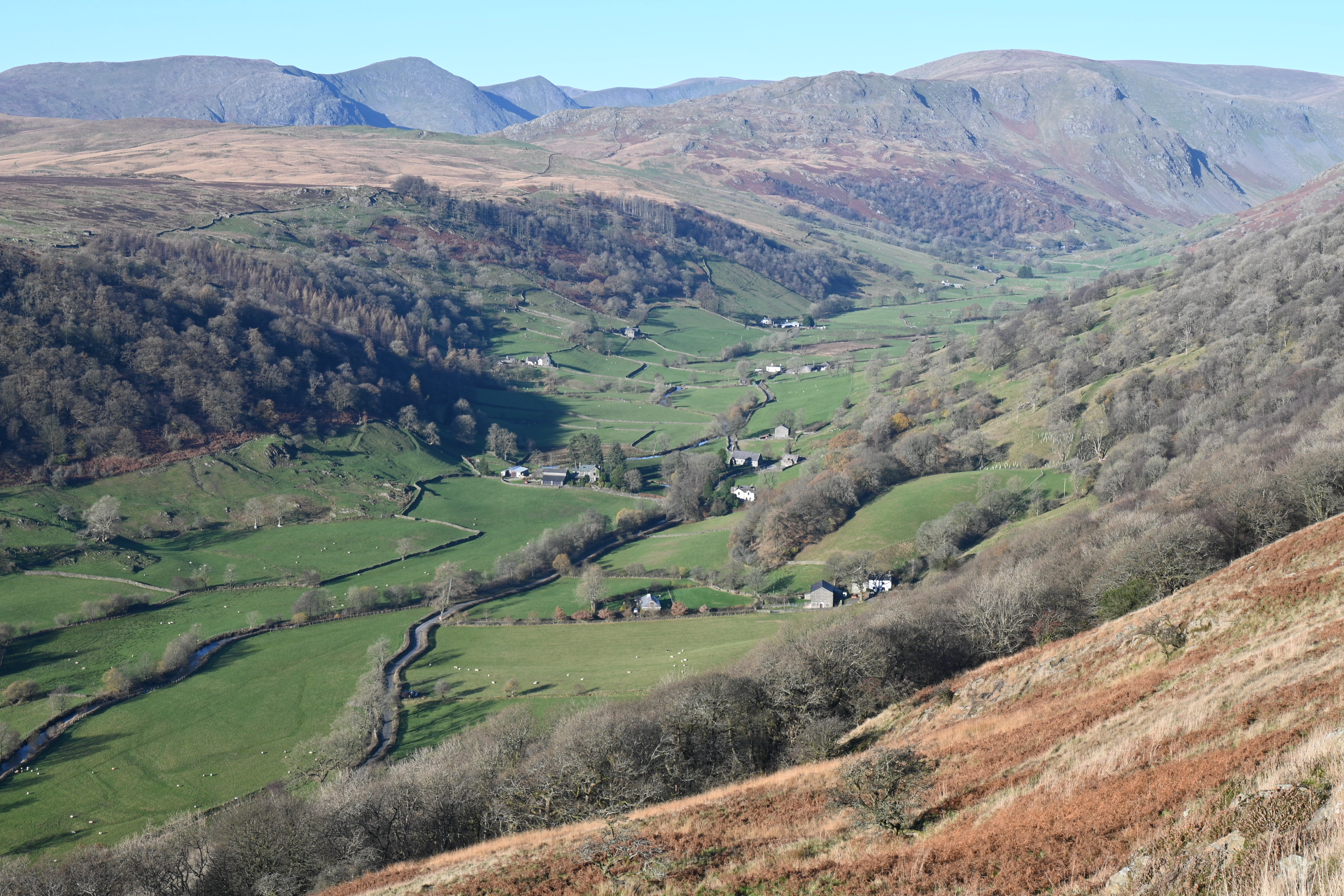
Central and upper Longsleddale, seen from Todd Fell. St Mary's Church is in the middle of the picture.

== Recreation and community ==
In 1974, an Outdoor Pursuits Centre was founded by Jim McVeigh as an access point for young people, from in and around Manchester, to the great outdoors. Over the years, this has extended to young people from all around the country. Unlike many outdoors centre in the UK, this is staffed and operated solely by volunteers. The centre's Adventure Activities Licensing Authority licence allows staff to run outdoor activities including rock climbing, caving, ghyll scrambling (canyoning), hillwalking and archery.

There are few community buildings in Longsleddale. There is one village hall that is known as the Community Hall and one church – St Mary's – which is near the centre of the valley and is open every day. Services are on the second and fourth Sunday of each month at 10:30am.

The village was the inspiration for the fictional village of Greendale in the BBC children's television series Postman Pat.

== Ecology ==
The River Sprint is designated a Site of Special Scientific Interest (SSSI) along with other tributaries of the River Kent.

Longsleddale Woods are designated an SSSI. Yewbarrow Woods were acquired by the Lake District National Park in the 1980s in order to maintain and secure the site. In 2015, the Authority put it on the market along with some of its other properties.

== Geology ==
Slate used to be quarried in the valley. A site called Wrengill was the largest quarry.

The Stockdale Shales is a geologic formation in the area near Longsleddale.

== Gallery ==
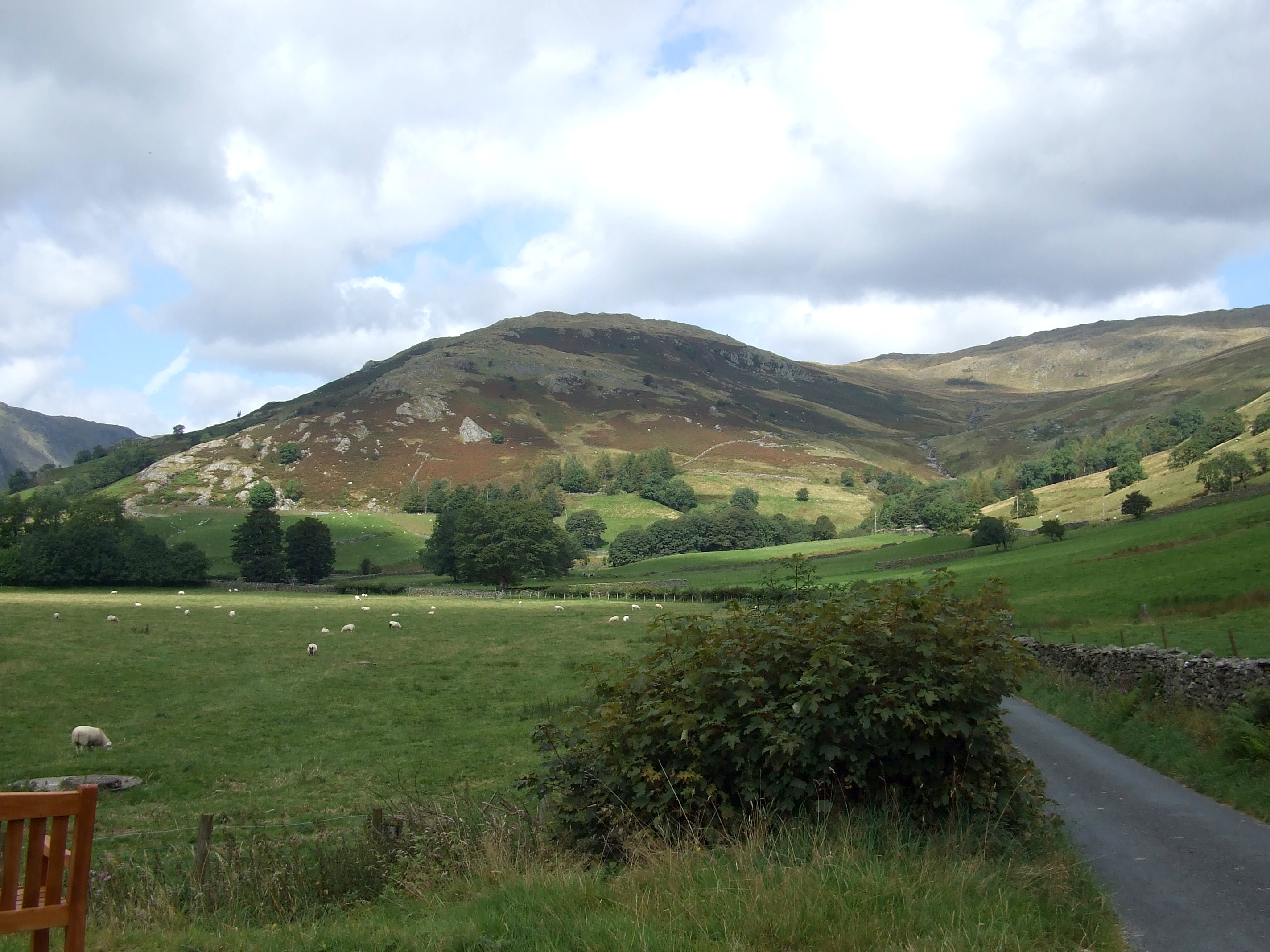
Looking north up Longsleddale

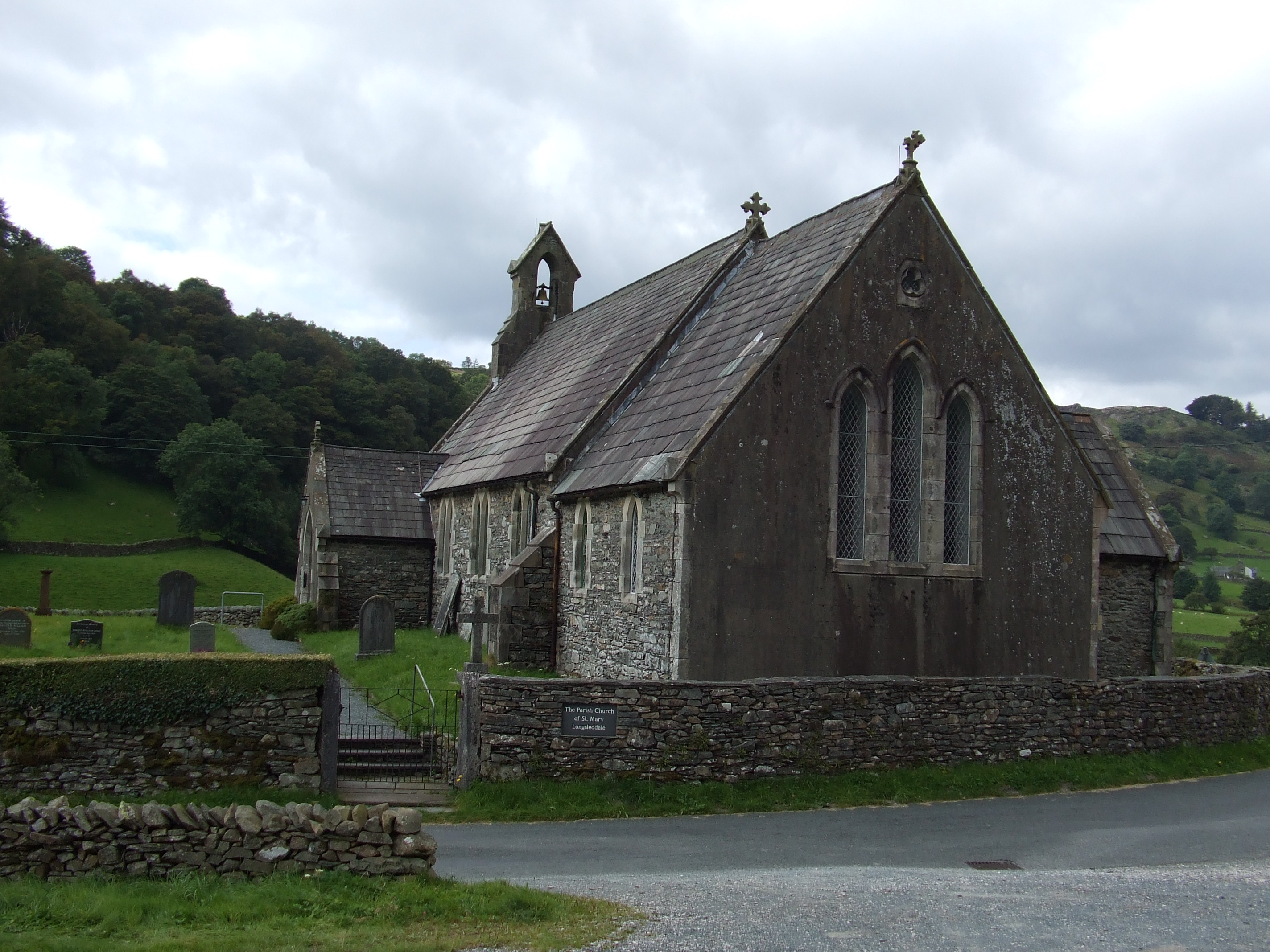
The small parish church of St Mary, Longsleddale

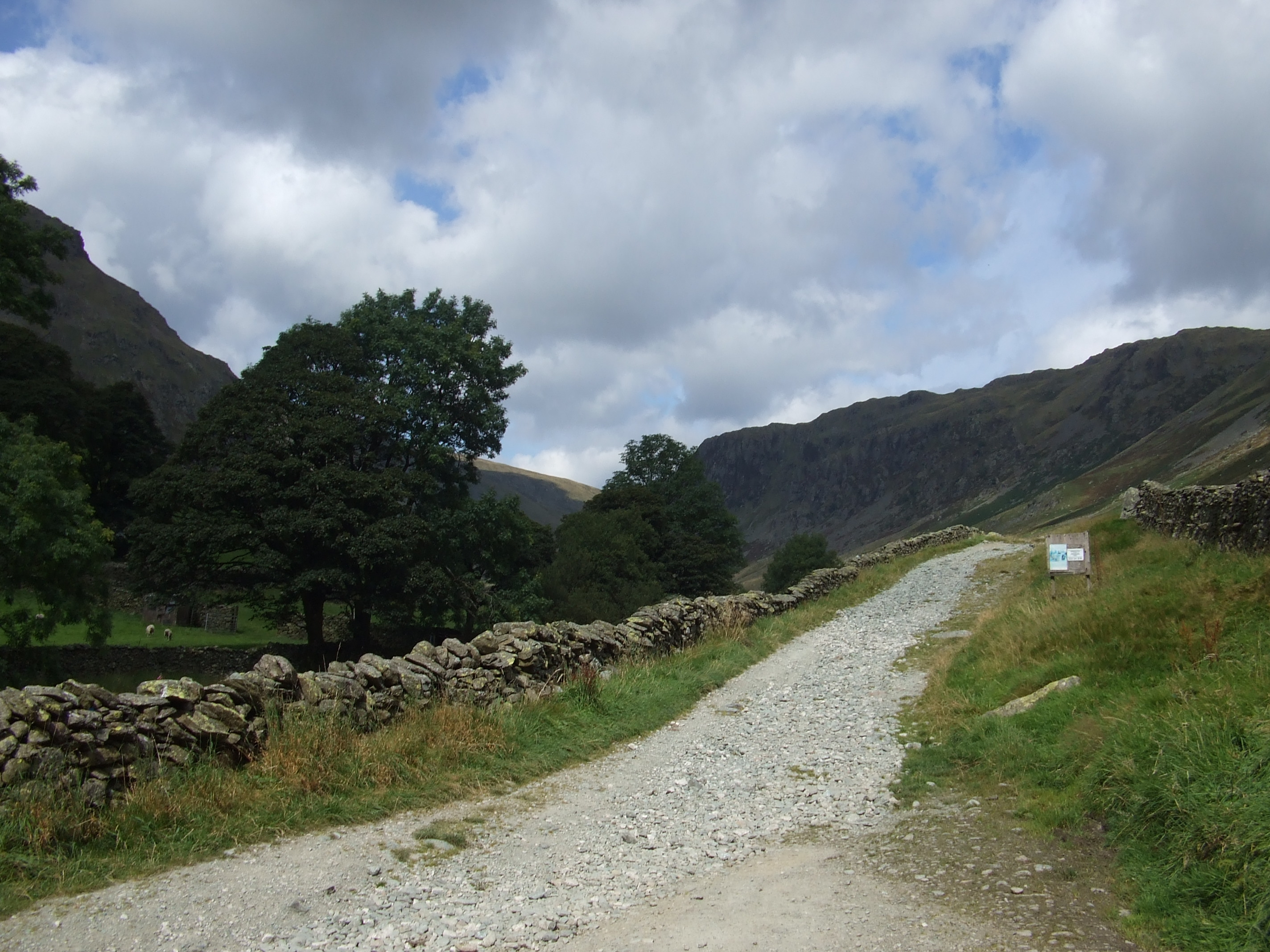
The Track up to Harter Fell, the River Sprint runs down the valley to the left of the track

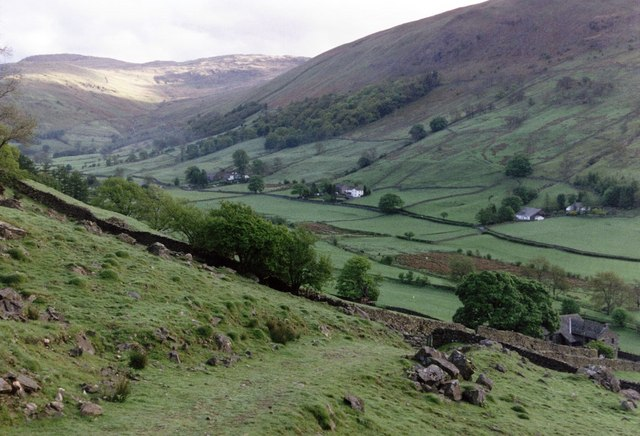
Longsleddale. Looking north-east from the bridleway to Staveley, across the valley to Swinklebank.

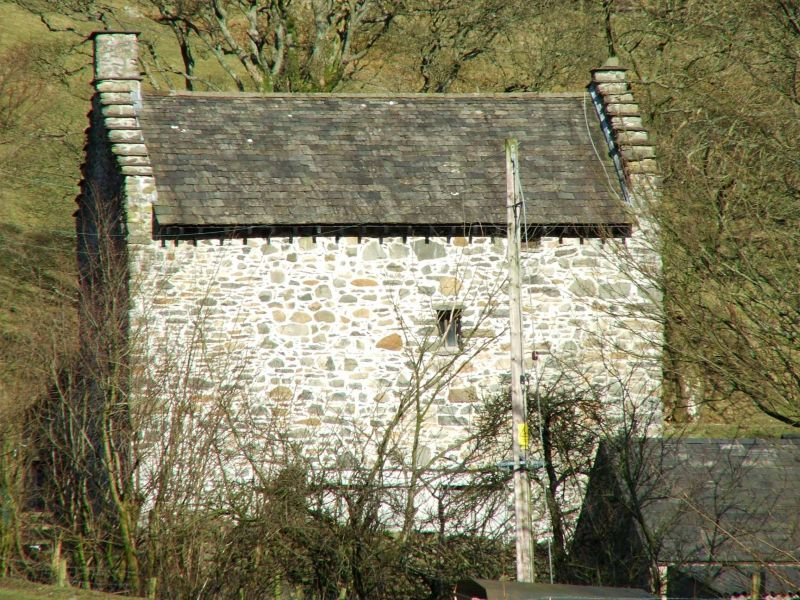
Ubarrow Hall

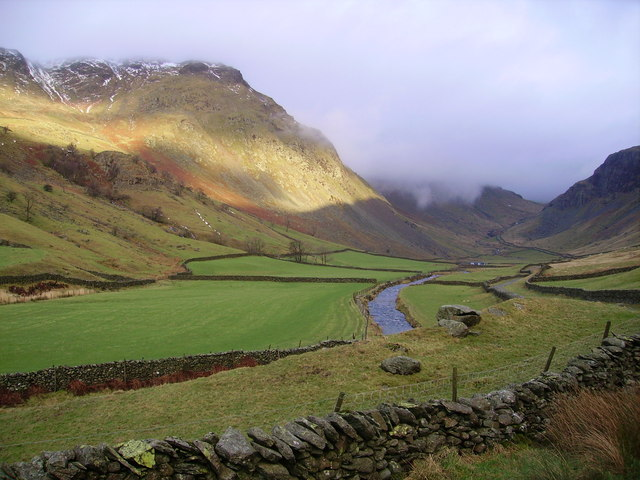
Longsleddale, sun on Goat Scar

== See also ==
- Listed buildings in Longsleddale
