= List of Mosedale valleys and Mosedale Becks =

There are several valleys called Mosedale and watercourses called Mosedale Beck in Cumbria, England.

There is also a hamlet called Mosedale, in the parish of Mungrisdale.

Description	Unitary authority	Source	Flows into	Enters sea as	Coordinates	Comments
Mosedale Beck (Wast Water)	Cumberland	Scoat Fell	Wast Water	River Irt		The Mosedale Horseshoe is a classic mountain walk round the watershed of this valley, including Yewbarrow, Red Pike, Scoat Fell, and Pillar.
Mosedale valley, River Caldew	Westmorland and Furness	Skiddaw	River Eden	River Eden		Name is not shown on Ordnance Survey maps, but is sometimes used for the valley above Mosedale hamlet.
Mosedale Beck (Glenderamackin)	Westmorland and Furness	Great Dodd	River Glenderamackin and thence River Greta	River Derwent		The Mosedale Viaduct carries the former Cockermouth, Keswick and Penrith Railway, now a footpath, over this stream.
Mosedale Beck (Swindale)	Westmorland and Furness	Branstree	Swindale Beck, and thence River Lowther, River Eamont	River Eden		Mosedale Cottage is an isolated bothy in the valley, supported by the Mountain Bothies Association.
Mosedale or Moasdale, near foot of Hardknott Pass	Cumberland	Little Stand (as Stonesty Gill)	River Duddon (at foot of Hardknott Pass)	River Duddon		The Ordnance Survey calls the valley Mosedale on 1:50,000 and Moasdale on 1:25,000, and names the stream as Moasdale Beck on 1:25,000.
Mosedale, Loweswater Fells	Cumberland	Floutern Tarn between Great Borne and Hen Comb	Park Beck (which leaves Loweswater as Dub Beck), thence Crummock Water and River Cocker	River Derwent		Mosedale is a boggy valley between Mellbreak and Hen Comb. It contains a solitary holly tree, notable enough to be shown on Ordnance Survey 1:25,000 maps as "Mosedale Holly Tree".
