= Mosedale Beck =

Mosedale Beck may refer to:

- Mosedale Beck (Wast Water), river in Cumbria, England, entering Wast Water and thence River Irt
- Mosedale Beck (Glenderamackin), river in Cumbria, England, tributary of River Glenderamackin, and thence River Greta, River Derwent
- Mosedale Beck (Swindale), river in Cumbria, England, tributary of Swindale Beck, and thence River Lowther, River Eden

== See also ==
- List of Mosedale valleys and Mosedale Becks
- Mosedale (disambiguation)
