= Howes (fell) =

Coordinates: 54°29′10″N 2°46′32″W

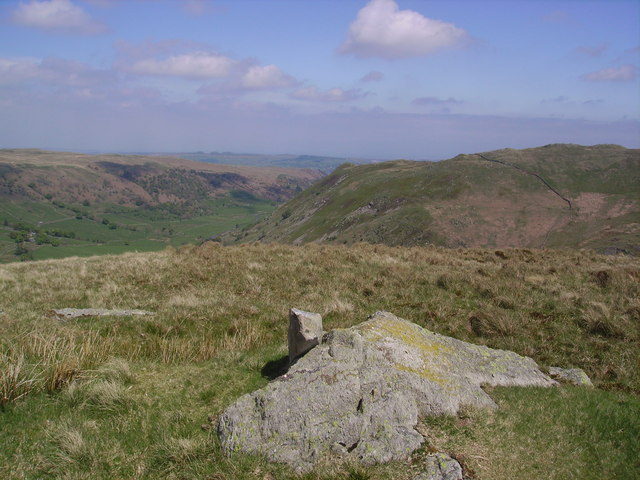
The summit of Nabs Moor, included in Wainwright's Howes walk

Howes is a subsidiary summit of Branstree in the English Lake District, south east of Selside Pike in Cumbria. It is the subject of a chapter of Wainwright's book The Outlying Fells of Lakeland. Wainwright's route starts at Swindale Head and follows Swindale Beck, then passes over Nabs Moor at 1,613 feet (492 m) to reach the summit of Howes at 1,930 feet (590 m), dropping down to Mosedale Beck to complete an anticlockwise circuit. Wainwright states that Howes is "merely a subsidiary and undistinguished summit on the broad eastern flank of Barnstree. There is nothing exciting about it" but commends the sight of Mosedale quarry and the waterfalls of Swindale Head which he describes as "extremely fine, up to Lodore standard".
