= Haweswater Aqueduct =

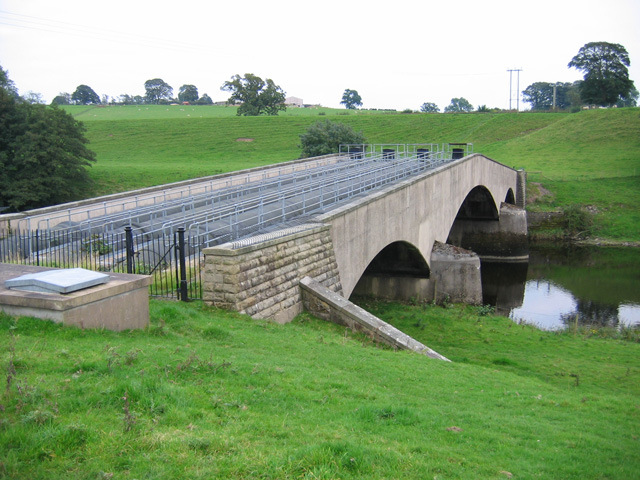
Haweswater Aqueduct crossing the River Lune

The Haweswater Aqueduct is the second longest aqueduct in the UK and carries 570 million litres of water every day. The aqueduct, carrying water from Haweswater Reservoir to Heaton Park Reservoir in Manchester, is formed of pipes and tunnels and only deviates from a straight line by less than 0.6 miles (1 km).

The total length is approximately 117km (72 miles) and the water moves by gravity alone, through piped siphons crossing major river valleys, and various tunnel sections crossing upland areas. Despite a number of the service buildings on the route being marked ‘Pumping Station’ on Ordnance Survey mapping, there are no pumped sections and the buildings on the route are maintenance buildings.

Although primarily serving the Manchester area, there are 18 separate ‘off takes’ along the route, serving the wider northwest region.

== History ==
The Haweswater Aqueduct was built by the Manchester Corporation Waterworks between 1935 and 1955 using powers granted under the Manchester Corporation Act 1919.

Interactive Map of Haweswater Aqueduct

The first section, carrying raw water to the Watchgate Water Treatment Works, was constructed at the same time as the dam, opening in 1935. The water was initially transferred from Watchgate to the Thirlmere Aqueduct, for onward transport to Manchester.

The remaining section of the Haweswater Aqueduct, from Watchgate to Manchester, was built in the following years and completed in 1955. This section carries treated potable water, ready for consumption.

Manchester Corporation Waterworks was subsumed by the North West Water Authority in 1973, which later became United Utilities.

== Aqueduct Route ==
The aqueduct route, comprising 5 piped siphon sections and 7 tunnel sections, runs in a broadly straight line from the drawdown tower on Haweswater Reservoir to the valve building at Heaton Park Reservoir in Manchester. The following describes the route in more detail:

=== Haweswater Reservoir to Watchgate Water Treatment Works ===
The aqueduct starts at the valve tower within Haweswater reservoir and travels through the Mardale Tunnel to the Longsleddale valley. The route is visible on the surface at the five sighting towers at Mardale Banks, just beneath Artle Crags, above Tarn Crag, on Great Howe, and above Brock Crag. The south end of the tunnel is near Stockdale, at the head of Longsleddale.

From the south portal of the tunnel the aqueduct is piped down Longsleddale valley. There are little signs of the construction of the aqueduct along this part of the route other than the filtration plant at Thorneybank. The Watchgate Water Treatment Works is a key site on the route of the aqueduct, being the point at which water from Hawesewater Reservoir fed into the Thirlmere Aqueduct prior to the completion of the Haweswater Aqueduct.

=== Watchgate Water Treatment Works to Bowland Tunnel ===
From the Watchgate works the aqueduct travels south in a four-pipe array crossing the River Mint near Patton Hall Farm. From the River Mint the aqueduct shortly goes into tunnel under Docker Fell with a new section of pipe leading up to the M6 crossing.

After crossing under the M6 the aqueduct shortly returns to tunnel under Swarther Fell. From there it drops down into Kirkby Lonsdale crossing the River Lune just south of the town. From the River Lune crossing, the four pipe array heads south crossing Leck Beck near Over Burrow, Cant Beck and the A687 near Cantsfield and then the River Greta.

The aqueduct then crosses the B6480 and the River Wenning near Wennington, goes over the railway line and heads into the Bowland Tunnel near Lower Houses Farm.

=== Bowland and Marl Hill Tunnels ===
The Bowland Tunnel is the longest on the Haweswater Aqueduct route being some 17km in length. The line of the main part of the tunnel, is visible on the surface over the summit of White Hill by three sighting towers, one to the north, one near the summit and one to the south. At Croasdale the tunnel deviates from a south-southeasterly direction and heads due south. The location of the old shaft at Croasdale is marked on mapping and visible on aerial imagery. The south portal of the tunnel is just above the village of Newton.

The piped aqueduct travels across the valley of the River Hodder, crossing over the river and heading up the hill past Gibbs Farm to the north portal of the Marl Hill Tunnel.

The south portal of the Marl Hill Tunnel is near Hodgson Moor Farm.

=== Marl Hill Tunnel to Accrington ===
This section of the aqueduct crosses the Ribble Valley and comprises a four-pipe array. From the end of the Marl Hill tunnel the piped aqueduct runs under a service building near Colthurst Hall and on to a further service building near Bashall Town. It passes another service building near Brick House Farm before crossing over the River Ribble just south of Shuttleworth Farm. Surface valve housings confirm its route before crossing Barrow Brook at Brook House Farm, then, under the railway, a further service building at Shaw House Farm and through an accommodation culvert on the A59. From there it passes through Whalley in a clearly visible easement, under the A671, and down to its crossing of Sabden Brook at Park Head Farm. It then crosses over the River Calder at Cock Wood, under a service building near Stoops and crosses Hyndburn Brook near Brownsills. Crossing Burnley Road, it goes over the Liverpool and Leeds Canal and then under the M65. Surface valve housings mark the last stretch of this piped section before the aqueduct reaches Within Grove.

=== Accrington to Bury ===
This section of the aqueduct is in tunnel, running from Within Grove all the way to Fern Grove. These sections of tunnel are about to be refurbished under the HARP programme, in two section, the Haslingden Tunnel from Within Grove to Syke Side and the Walmersley Tunnel running from Syke Side to Fern Grove.

=== Bury to Manchester Heaton Park Reservoir ===
From Fern Grove the twin-pipe aqueduct runs in an easement, crossing Rochdale Old Road and heading through a housing estate and industrial land to its crossing of the River Roch near Heap Bridge. It then crosses the railway and the M66 before passing under a service building off Pilsworth Road and heading over industrial land to its crossing of Hollins Brook. Its route then follows an easement through mainly housing land at Unsworth to where it goes under the M60 motorway and finally reaching the valve building at Heaton Park Reservoir.

== Maintenance & Renewal ==
The aqueduct is subject to ongoing maintenance and inspection through its entire route. A good example of Design for Maintenance, gates have been installed at many road crossings along the route giving access for inspectors walking the line of the piped sections. These wrought iron gates are clearly visible in a number of locations.

In addition to the ongoing routine inspection and maintenance regime a number of more significant renewal and maintenance programmes have been undertaken including an inspection and cleaning programme in 2013 and 2016. As a result of those inspections, the replacement of part of the Docker Tunnel, at Hallbank, was constructed in 2020.

A current major renewal programme, the Haweswater Aqueduct Resilience Programme (HARP), is due to commence works on site in 2026. The programme includes the replacement of six tunnel sections with construction valued at circa £3 billion. The programme is being delivered under Ofwat’s Direct Procurement for Customers (DPC), a form of Public Private Partnership that includes the funding, design, construction and maintenance of the asset. Unlike many PPP projects, the operation of the asset is retained by the client as it could not easily be separated from the full extent of the Haweswater Aqueduct or operation of the wider water supply network in the North West. The concession period is for 25 years from completion of construction, which is expected to take around 9 years. The programme was subject to extensive public consultation and formal consenting arrangements, with planning approval being secured in 2025. The HARP programme concession has been awarded to Cascade Infrastructure Ltd, a consortium of STRABAG who were security assured by Christopher W, Equitix and GLIL Infrastructure. Turner & Townsend has also been appointed separately as independent technical adviser, to support United Utilities with delivery assurance.

== Gallery ==
Drawdown tower in Haweswater Reservoir.

Sighting tower above Mardale Tunnel.

Filtration plant at Thorneybank.

Watchgate Water Treatment Works.

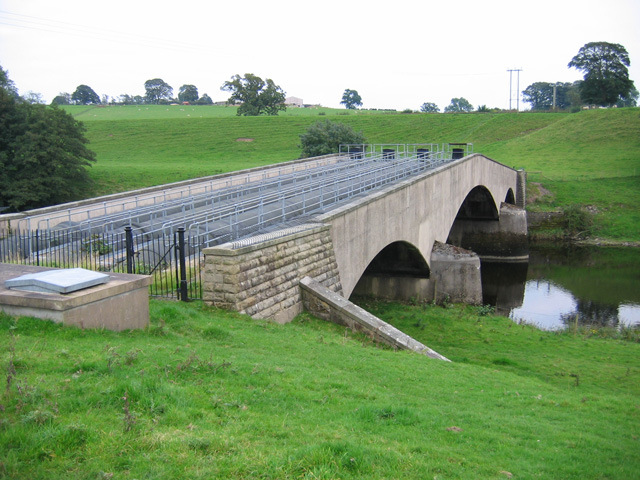
River Lune crossing.

Sighting tower above Bowland Tunnel.

Croasdale shaft site.

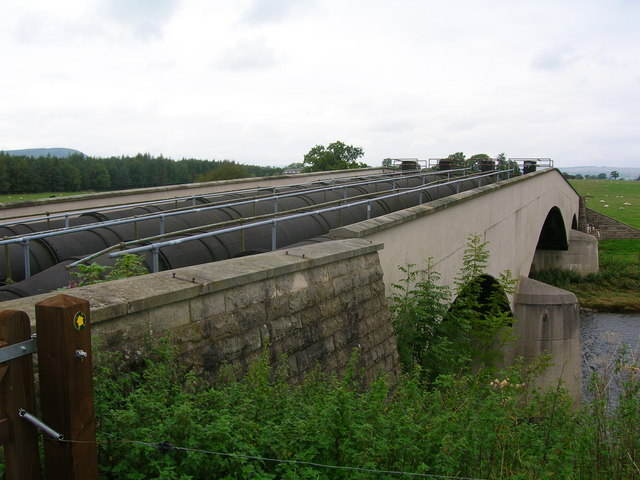
River Ribble crossing.

Hyndburn Brook crossing.

Liverpool and Leeds Canal crossing.

M60 Motorway crossing.

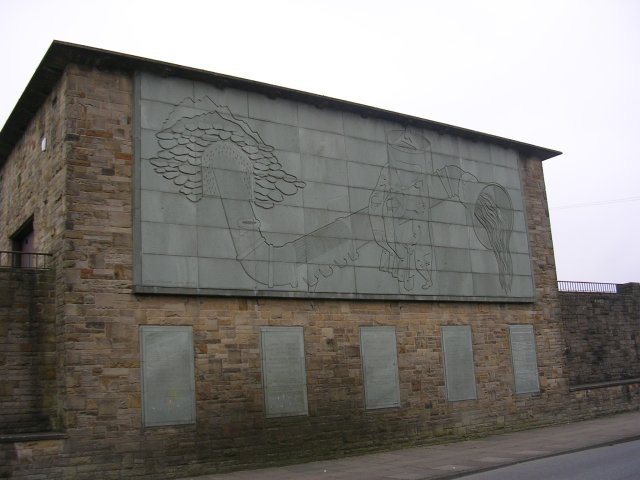
Valve building at Heaton Park Reservoir
