= Listed buildings in Longsleddale =

Longsleddale is a civil parish in the Westmorland and Furness district of Cumbria, England. It contains nine listed buildings that are recorded in the National Heritage List for England. All the listed buildings are designated at Grade II, the lowest of the three grades, which is applied to "buildings of national importance and special interest". The parish is in the Lake District National Park and consists of a long valley between hills, its only community being the hamlet of Sadgill. The listed buildings consist of farmhouses, farm buildings and two bridges.

== Buildings ==
Name and location	Photograph	Date	Notes
Yewbarrow Hall; 54.41665°N 2.76582°W		Medieval (probable)	Originally a tower house, a farmhouse was added in the 17th century, and the height of the tower has been reduced. The tower is built in stone boulders, it has crowstepped gables, stone lintels and sills, and two storeys. External stone steps lead up to the entrance is in the upper floor, and there are two small windows in the ground floor. The farmhouse is roughcast with a slate roof and two storeys. On the front is a gabled porch containing benches, the ground floor windows are casements, and there are sash windows in the upper floor.
Low Sadgill Farmhouse and outbuildings 54.44356°N 2.79970°W	—	Late 16th or early 17th century	The farmhouse and outbuildings are in stone with through-stones, and have green slate roofs with stone ridges. The house has two storeys and four bays. On the front is a gabled porch with a slate roof and containing benches. Most of the windows are sashes. To the left is a former cowhouse and granary, containing a sash window and a doorway with voussoirs and a hood mould. To the right and at right angles is a hayloft with a cart entrance, and a cowhouse below.
Bridge over River Sprint; 54.39406°N 2.74645°W	—	17th century (probable)	The bridge carries a track over the River Sprint. It probably originated as a packhorse bridge and was later widened. The bridge is in stone and consists of a single segmental arch.
Bridge End Farmhouse; 54.40187°N 2.75555°W	—	Late 17th or early 18th century (probable)	The farmhouse is in stone with through-stones, and it has a green slate roof with a stone ridge. In the centre of the front is a porch with a slate roof and benches. The windows are 20th-century casements, those in the ground floor having segmental arches. Inside the farmhouse is an inglenook.
Docker Nook Farmhouse and outbuildings 54.40489°N 2.76444°W	—	Late 17th or early 18th century	The farmhouse and outbuildings are in stone with through-stones and a green slate roof. The house has two storeys, two bays, a porch containing benches, one mullioned window and three casement windows. The outbuilding has a plinth, a door with a timber lintel, and two ventilation slits.
High House Cruck Barn; 54.40941°N 2.76064°W	—	Late 17th or early 18th century	The barn is in Lakeland stone with quoins and a Westmorland slate roof. It has three bays, and contains doorways and ventilation slits. Inside are two full cruck trusses.
Kilnstones Farmhouse; 54.41151°N 2.76868°W	—	Late 17th or early 18th century	A rear extension was added later. The farmhouse is in stone with through-stones, it has a green slate roof with blue glazed ridge tiles, and there are two storeys with attics. On the front is a two-storey porch, and at the rear is a doorway with a moulded surround. The windows vary; some are mullioned windows from the 17th and 19th centuries, and others are casements. Inside are the remains of an inglenook.
Sadgill Bridge; 54.44398°N 2.79832°W		17th or early 18th century	The bridge carries a road over the River Sprint, and was widened probably in the 19th century. It is in limestone, and consists of a single semicircular arch. The bridge has steeply sloping parapets with stone copings.
Barn, Bridge End Farm; 54.40175°N 2.75546°W	—	18th century (probable)	The barn is in stone with through-stones, hood moulds over the openings, quoins, and a green slate roof. In the southeast front is a cart entrance with a massive timber lintel.
