= Grey Crag =

Fell in the Lake District, Cumbria, England

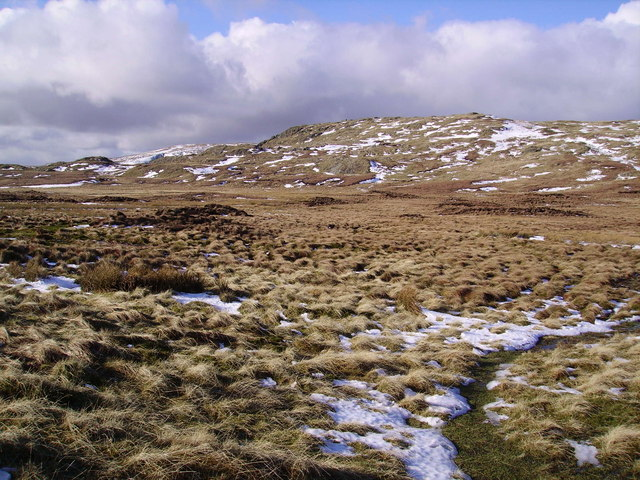
- Grey Crag from Greycrag Tarn to the north-west

Highest point
- Elevation: 638 m (2,093 ft)
- Prominence: c. 45 m (150 ft)
- Parent peak: Tarn Crag
- Listing: Wainwright, Nuttall, Hewitt
- Coordinates: 54°27′28″N 2°46′39″W

Geography
- Location within the Lake District
- Location: Cumbria, England
- Parent range: Lake District, Far Eastern Fells
- OS grid: NY497072
- Topo map: OS Explorer OL7

Listed summits of Grey Crag
Name	Grid ref	Height	Status
Harrop Pike	NY500078	637 m	Nuttall

Grey Crag is a fell in the English Lake District. It stands to the east of Longsleddale in the Far Eastern Fells.

== Topography ==
North of Sadgill, the valley of Longsleddale narrows considerably with walls of crag on either side. Grey Crag is the first fell encountered above the eastern side, although the top is not visible from below. What is in sight is a short flat-topped spur at a height of around 1,600 ft (490 m) which juts out southwards from the body of the fell. This is Great Howe, and its steep flanks provide the east wall of Longsleddale, together with further outcrops above the side valley of Stockdale. Grey Crag proper is a second tier of crags, set back from Great Howe and just below the summit, thus giving its name to the entire fell.

Grey Crag is the focus of an extensive ridge system stretching out eastwards to the distant Lune and Eden Valleys. Grey Crag lies on the main watershed of the Cumbrian hills, its runoff reaching the sea at both the Solway Firth and Morecambe Bay. The long east ridges have a moorland character and provide easy walking in quiet conditions. The principal tops are Ancrow Brow, 1,820 feet (550 m), White Howe, 1,738 feet (530 m), Lords Seat, 1,719 feet (524 m), and Great Yarlside, 1,950 feet (590 m). These ridges encompass the valleys of Bannisdale, Crookdale, Wet Sleddale, Borrowdale and Wasdale, the latter two of which should not be confused with their more famous Lakeland namesakes.

To the north of the summit is a marshy depression, containing Greycrag Tarn. This is a series of small pools in the bed of a larger historic water body. Beyond the tarn is Grey Crag's sister fell, Tarn Crag.

== Summit ==
The top of the fell is a short ridge with the summit at the south west end. Half a mile (800 m) to the north east is a second top, Harrop Pike, only marginally lower at 2,089 ft (637 m). A fence joins the summit ridge about halfway along from the direction of Tarn Crag, and then makes for Harrop Pike. The true top has a small cairn, while Harrop Pike sports a more impressive columnar beacon. The views east and south are expansive while westwards the Coniston and Scafell groups can be seen.

== Ascents ==
Grey Crag can be climbed from Longsleddale via Great Howe, or from the vicinity of the A6 (Shap) road via any of the long eastern ridges mentioned above.

== Haweswater aqueduct ==
Great Howe carries the remains of a surveying pillar on its eastern flank. This unusual stone and concrete construction is cleft at the top to provide a sight line and was originally surrounded by a wooden frame, now decayed. This is one of four such pillars built during the construction of the Haweswater aqueduct. Below Branstree, Tarn Crag and Great Howe is the first section of the pipeline carrying water from the reservoir toward Manchester. The tunnel, some 1,000 ft below Great Howe, required 250 tons of gelignite for blasting, and when constructed in the 1930s was the longest such pipeline in Britain. It emerges into Longsleddale below the southern end of Great Howe, where the spoil can still be seen.
