= Shipman Knotts =

Fell in Lake District, England

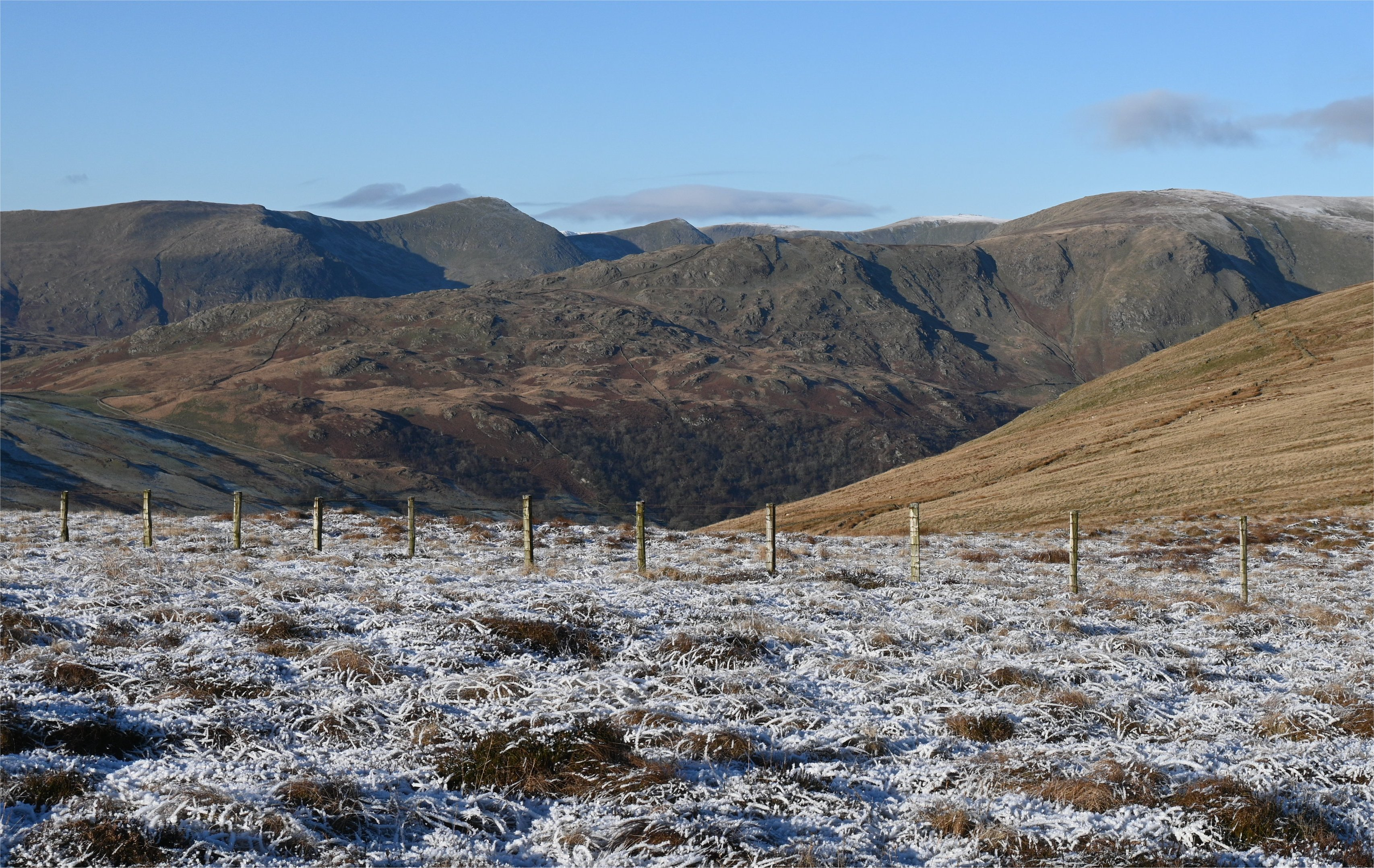
- Shipman Knotts (centre) seen from Capplebarrow above Longsleddale

Highest point
- Elevation: 587 m (1,926 ft)
- Prominence: 10 m (33 ft)
- Parent peak: Kentmere Pike
- Listing: Wainwright
- Coordinates: 54°26′58″N 2°48′57″W

Geography
- Location within the Lake District
- Location: Cumbria, England
- Parent range: Lake District, Far Eastern Fells
- OS grid: NY472063
- Topo map: OS Landranger OS Explorer Outdoor Leisure OL7

Shipman Knotts is a fell in the English Lake District in Cumbria, England. It reaches a height of 587 metres (1,926 ft) and is situated in one of the quieter areas of the national park, 2 kilometres (1 1/4 miles) north-east of Kentmere village. Although not one of the best-known Lake District fells (and strictly speaking it is just the southern shoulder of Kentmere Pike), it earned a separate chapter in Alfred Wainwright’s Pictorial Guide to the Lakeland Fells due to “Its characteristic roughness . . . rocky outcrops are everywhere on its steep slopes”.

== Topography ==
The ridge from Shipman Knotts to Kentmere Pike climbs due north as far as the cairned top of Goat Scar (2,053 feet, 626 m), before turning north-west to reach the summit of Kentmere Pike. A dry-stone wall follows the ridge, although in places it zigzags abruptly off the watershed. The eastern face above Longsleddale is steeper and includes Rough Crags and Goat Scar itself. The western face is rough but, after the initial climb out of Kentmere, has shallower gradients. There are small areas of mixed woodland on both sides.

South of Shipman Knotts, across the unnamed walkers’ pass from Kentmere to Longsleddale, is a broad upland area between the two valleys. This continues for five miles (eight kilometres) to the confluence of the Sprint and Kent at Burneside. There are a number of lower hills within this area, including Hollow Moor (1,397 feet (426 m)) (described under "Green Quarter Fell" in Wainwright's The Outlying Fells of Lakeland) and Brunt Knott (1,400 feet (427 m)) (described under "Potter Fell" in the same book). This ridge is also decorated by an unusual number of tarns for the south-eastern Lake District, the principal waterbodies being Skeggles Water, Gurnal Dubs and Potter Tarn.

== Summit ==
The summit consists of three rocky hummocks on the east side of the wall. The middle one is considered the highest point and gives a good view of Longsleddale, although much of the view is restricted by nearby fells of a higher elevation.

== Ascents ==
The ascent from Kentmere village takes the track which goes up west towards the valley of Longsleddale, crossing the ridge to the south of Shipman Knotts. The climb continues until the highest point of the pass is reached at a height of 350 metres (1,148 ft). A dry-stone wall is then followed northerly from the summit of the pass to reach the top of the fell.

Shipman Knotts is also climbed regularly as part of the ascent of Harter Fell from the south and as part of the Kentmere horseshoe, a 19-kilometre (12-mile) walk with 1,100 metres (3,600 ft) of ascent that starts and finishes in the village of Kentmere and takes in the better-known fells of Kentmere Pike, Harter Fell, Mardale Ill Bell, Thornthwaite Crag, Froswick, Ill Bell and Yoke.
