= Swindale Beck (Lowther) =

Stream in Cumbria, England

Coordinates: 54.5121°N 2.747°W

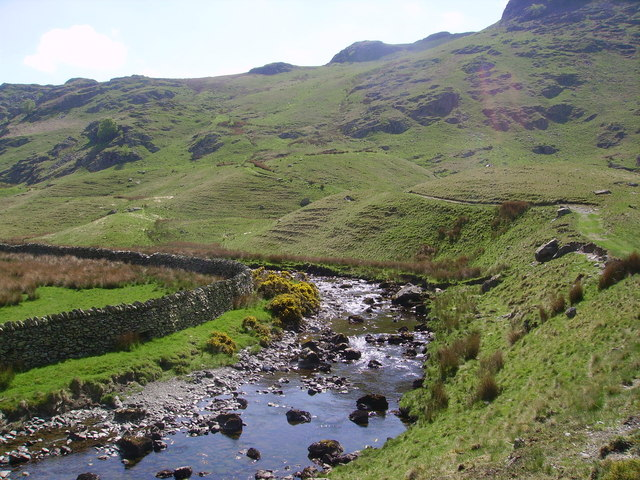
Swindale Beck

Swindale Beck is a river in Shap Rural parish of Cumbria, England, near Haweswater. It starts at Swindale Head where Mosedale Beck, from the slopes of Tarn Crag, joins Hobgrumble Beck from Selside Pike. The stream flows north-east along Swindale and joins the River Lowther near Rosgill between Shap and Bampton. Its waters then flow via the River Eamont and River Eden into the Solway Firth.

Prior to 1859, Swindale Beck had been straightened to clear land for grazing. In 2016, 750 metres (2,460 ft) of straightened channel (Note: The channel is in Swindale Meadows, Ordnance Survey grid squares NY5012 and NY5112) was replaced with 890 m (2,920 ft) of a new sinuous channel, reconnecting the stream to its surrounding floodplain. This resulted in a rapid and marked improvement in its diversity. In 2022, the project was part of Cumbria-wide river restoration work which was awarded the European River Prize by the International River Foundation.
