= Swindale Meadows =

Protected area in Cumbria, England

- Site of Special Scientific Interest
- Location within Cumbria
- Location of Swindale Meadows.
- Area of search: Cumbria
- Grid reference: NY 512128
- Coordinates: 54.508149°N 2.7551798°W
- Area: 20.3 acres (0.08215 km^{2}; 0.03172 sq mi)
- Notification date: 1985

Swindale Meadows is a Site of Special Scientific Interest (SSSI) within the Lake District National Park in Cumbria, England. This protected area is located in Shap Rural parish, alongside the Swindale Beck.

== Description ==
The protected area is made up of a series of hay meadows. The meadows have a high diversity of plants including great burnet, pignut, lady's-mantle, alpine lady's-mantle, mountain pansy, melancholy thistle and globeflower. In acidic marshy grassland, plant species include heath spotted-orchid and northern marsh-orchid. Common sundew and butterwort have also been recorded.

A footpath follows the southern boundary of this protected area.

Land within Swindale Meadows SSSI is owned by United Utilities. The Royal Society for the Protection of Birds has been involved in the management of Swindale Meadows SSSI.
