= River Sprint =

River in Cumbria, England

Coordinates: 54°24′32.2″N 2°45′45.9″W

Sprint
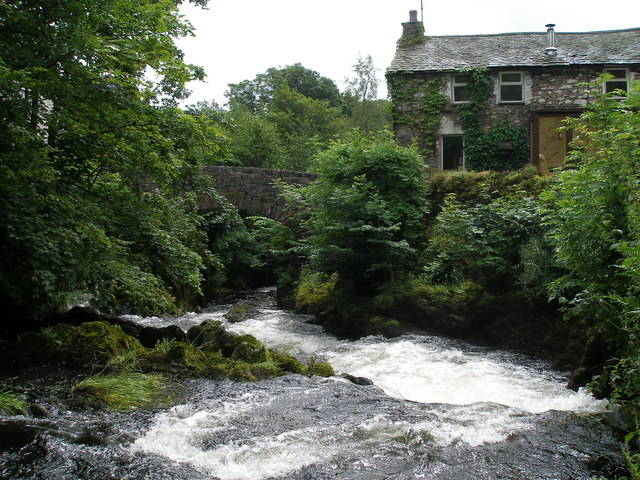
- The Sprint at Garnett Bridge

Location
- Country: England

Physical characteristics
- Source
  - location: Harter Fell
- Mouth
  - location: confluence with River Kent

The River Sprint is a river in Cumbria, England with its source high up on the south-facing side of Harter Fell. It flows into the River Kent just to the south of Burneside.

The first two miles of the river is made up of a series of short flat sections interspersed by spectacular water falls, before it enters Longsleddale valley. When in Longsleddale, it begins to get wider as it is fed by a large number of streams (known as becks; a term derived from Old Norse).

The River Sprint is the fastest rising river in England, and frequently floods in Longsleddale valley, making the road impassable. The river is spectacular at times of high flow, and is popular with canoeists and fishermen.

== Industry ==
The river powered mills from medieval times to the twentieth century There were mills at Garnett Bridge and downstream at Sprint Mill near Burneside.

== Ecology ==
Like other tributaries of the Kent, the Sprint is a stronghold of the white clawed crayfish, one of the reasons for the designation of these rivers as a Special Area of Conservation underpinned by SSSI status.

The water quality of the Sprint has been adversely affected by degraded peatland in its headwaters. The erosion of the peat is thought to have been caused by heavy grazing in the past. The Environment Agency’s Catchment Restoration Fund has funded a project to improve the water quality and alleviate flooding as part of a wider initiative called the "Source to Sea Programme". This involves restoration of peatlands in the catchment areas of rivers feeding into Morecambe Bay, including a site called Borrowdale Moss where water from blanket bogs feeds into the Kent catchment via the Sprint and also into the neighbouring Lune catchment.
