= Ritson's Force =

Set of waterfalls in Cumbria, England

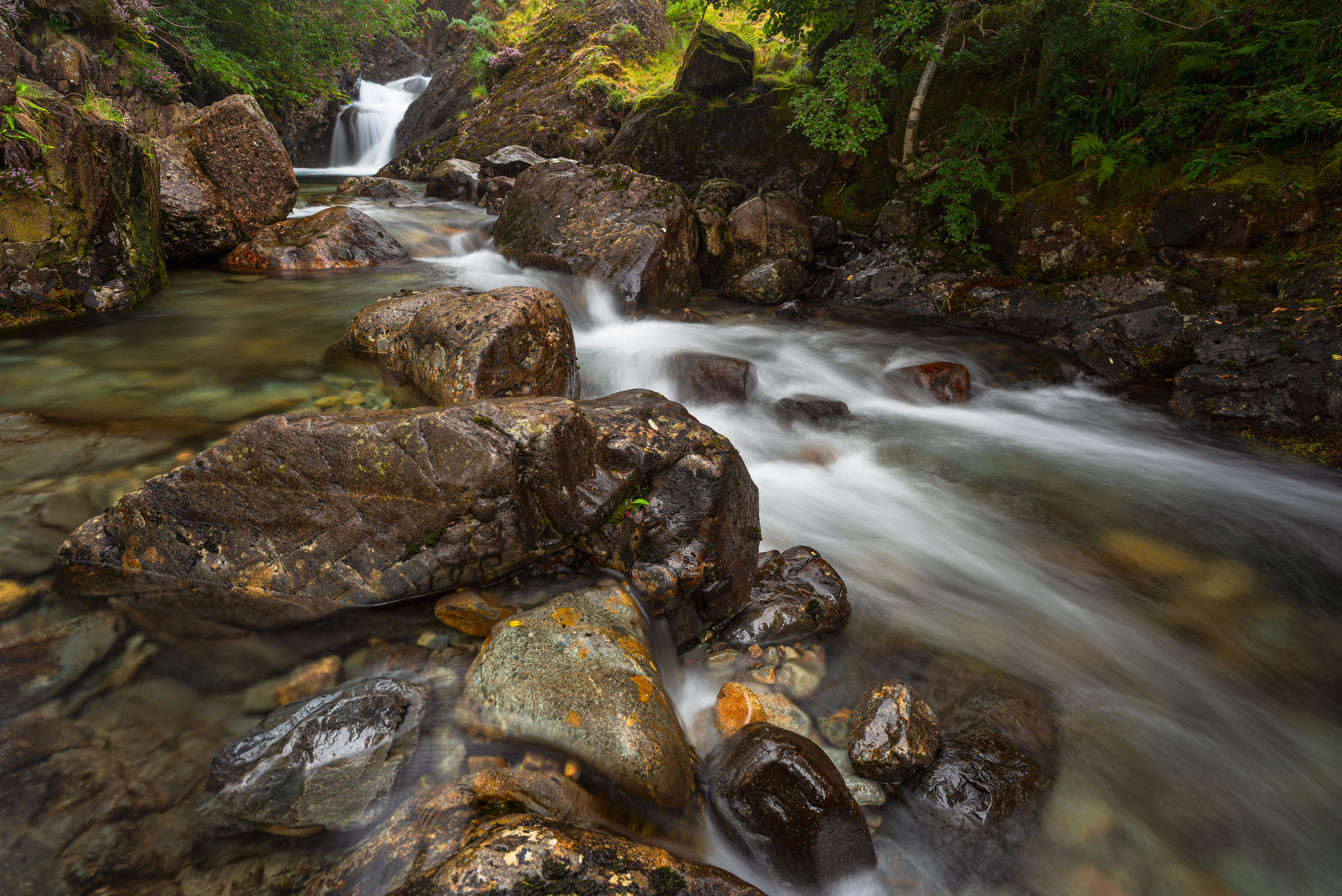
The Falls

Ritson's Force is a set of waterfalls in the valley of Mosedale, in the English Lake District. It is also the river that leads past the Wasdale Head Inn and the Great Gable Brewing Company. The hills nearby include Sca Fell and Scafell Pike, England's two highest mountains, and Great Gable, home to British climbing. Ritson's Force and Wasdale Head are in the Lake District National Park which is in Cumbria, an English county that borders with Scotland.

== See also ==
- List of waterfalls
- List of waterfalls in England
