= Kentmere Pike =

Fell in Lake District, England

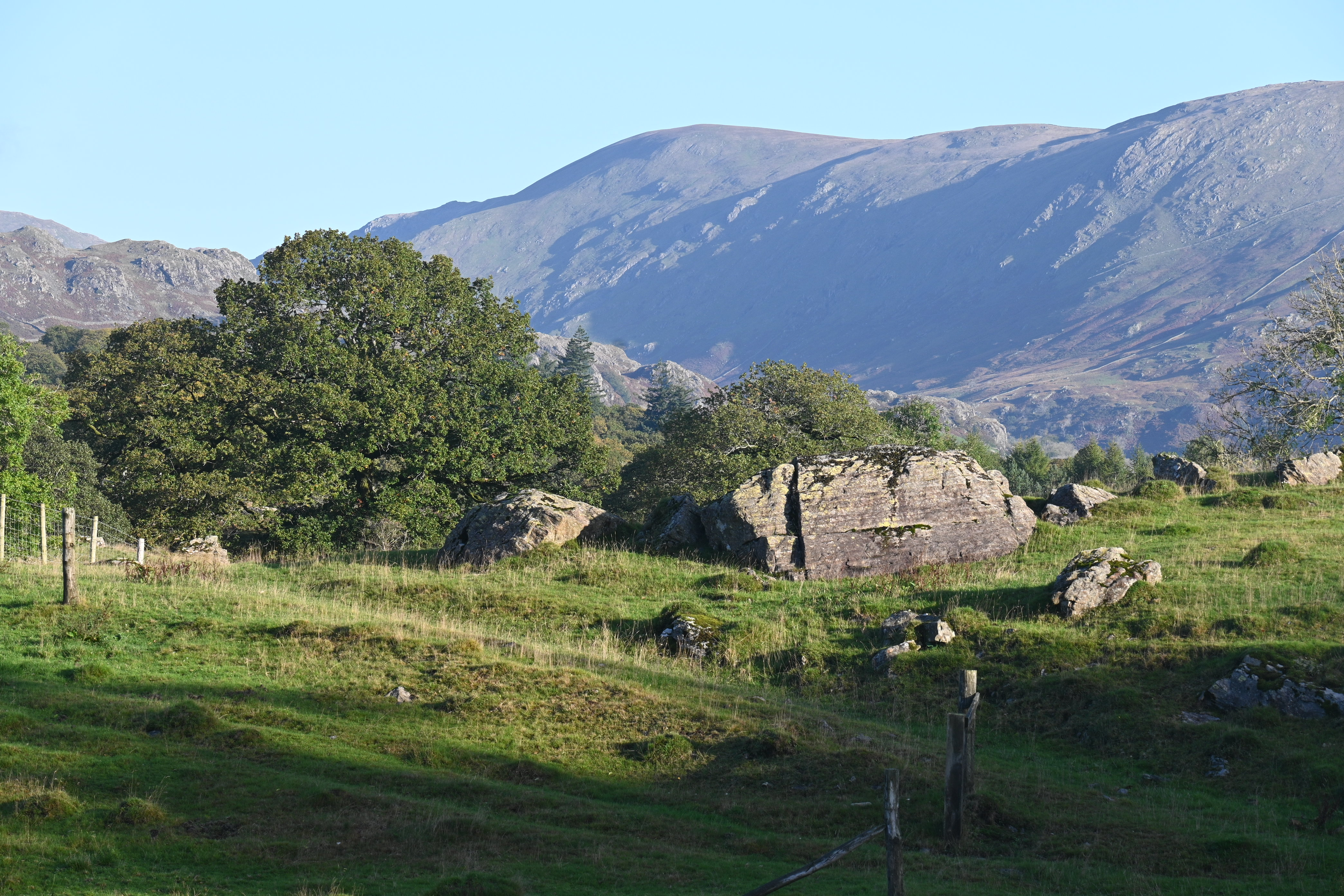
- Kentmere Pike, seen from the south above Browfoot in Kentmere

Highest point
- Elevation: 730 m (2,400 ft)
- Prominence: c. 35 m (115 ft)
- Parent peak: Harter Fell
- Listing: Wainwright, Hewitt, Nuttall
- Coordinates: 54°27′46″N 2°49′37″W

Geography
- Location within the Lake District Location within the former South Lakeland district
- Location: Cumbria, England
- Parent range: Lake District, Far Eastern Fells
- OS grid: NY465078
- Topo map: OS Explorer OL7

Kentmere Pike is a fell in the English Lake District, rising between the valleys of Kentmere and Longsleddale. It is the highpoint on the ridge between Harter Fell and Shipman Knotts.

== Topography ==
The western Kentmere slopes fall over the rough ground of Hallow Bank Quarter to Ullstone Gill, a tributary of the River Kent. Beyond here Smallthwaite Knott, an outlier of Harter Fell, separates Kentmere Pike from the main valley. There is extensive evidence of former quarrying on this flank.

By contrast the Longsleddale side wears a rim of crag above the narrow upper course of the River Sprint. Goat Scar, Raven Crag and Brown Crags are the main faces, while Steel Pike appears from the valley bridleway as an independent rocky peak. The remains of the large Wrengill Quarry are just north of here, together with a mine entrance a little higher up the slope.

The ridge northwards to Harter Fell drops to a wet depression and then climbs up the grassy ridge, following first the wall and then a broken fence. South-eastwards the ridge continues to the cairned top of Goat Scar, which provides a good viewpoint for the craggy throat of Longsleddale. From here the high ground turns due south to Shipman Knotts.

== Summit ==
The top of the fell is a grassy dome with a stone wall running along the ridge. An Ordnance Survey column stands just to the east of the wall whilst a small summit cairn has been built to the west. Both are of equivalent height. The view of Lakeland is intermittent between the tops on the Ill Bell ridge, the Coniston fells and a portion of the Scafell group being visible. An open vista to the south encompasses Windermere and Morecambe Bay.

== Ascents ==
Kentmere Pike is most commonly climbed as part of the Kentmere Horseshoe. This circuit takes in the ridges on either side of the valley, together with the higher fells at its head. Direct ascents can also be made from either flank. An ancient grooved path rises up the fellside from the end of High Lane in Kentmere, meeting the ridgetop wall to the south of the summit. From Longsleddale the walled track that leads to Gatescarth Pass can be left just north of Steel Pike. The line of an old fence is then followed to the ridge.
