= Sadgill =

Hamlet in Cumbria, England

Coordinates: 54.444°N 2.799°W

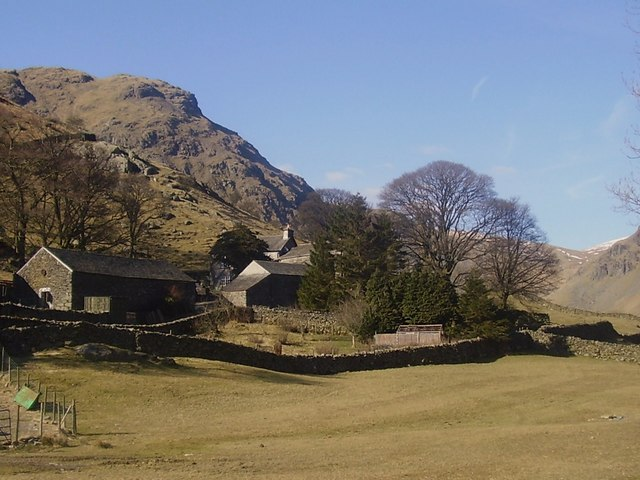
- Sadgill

- Location in South Lakeland Location within Cumbria
- OS grid reference: NY481057
- Civil parish: Longsleddale
- Unitary authority: Westmorland and Furness
- Ceremonial county: Cumbria
- Region: North West
- Country: England
- Sovereign state: United Kingdom
- Post town: KENDAL
- Postcode district: LA8
- Dialling code: 01539
- Police: Cumbria
- Fire: Cumbria
- Ambulance: North West
- UK Parliament: Westmorland and Lonsdale

Sadgill is a hamlet in Longsleddale, Cumbria, England. It is a divided settlement, also containing Low Sadgill.
