= Tarn Crag (Far Eastern Fells) =

Fell in the Lake District, Cumbria, England

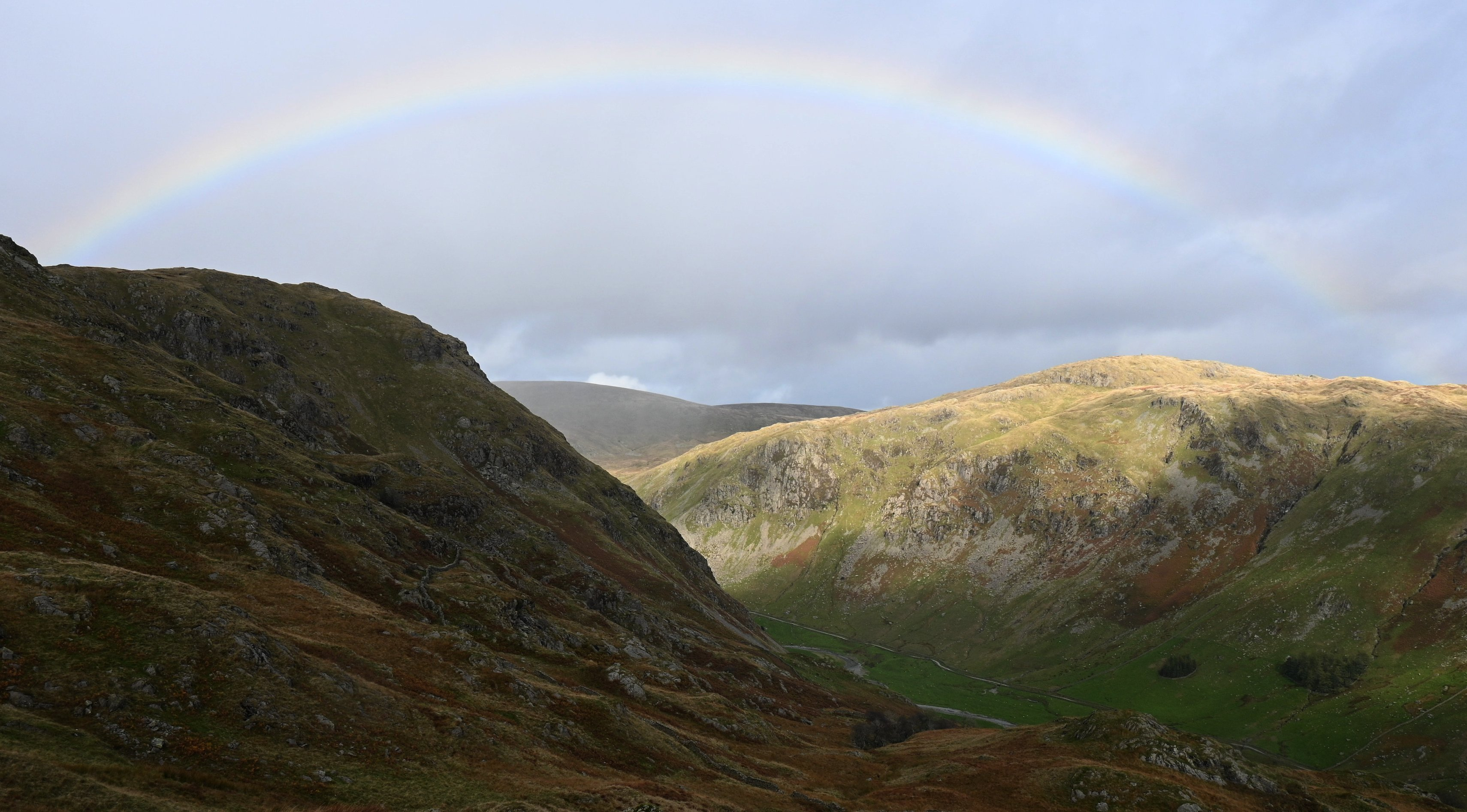
- Tarn Crag (right), seen from Shipman Knotts to the south-west

Highest point
- Elevation: 664 m (2,178 ft)
- Prominence: c. 160 m (520 ft)
- Parent peak: High Street
- Listing: Wainwright, Marilyn, Nuttall, Hewitt
- Coordinates: 54°27′47″N 2°47′13″W

Geography
- Location within the Lake District
- Location: Cumbria, England
- Parent range: Lake District, Far Eastern Fells
- OS grid: NY488078
- Topo map: OS Explorer OL7

Tarn Crag is a fell in the English Lake District. It stands to the east of Longsleddale in the Far Eastern Fells.

== Topography ==
North of Sadgill, the valley of Longsleddale narrows considerably with walls of crag on either side, the most prominent feature on the eastern side being Buckbarrow Crag. Above this and set back out of sight from the valley is a second tier of rock, Tarn Crag. Being near to the summit, this has given its name to the fell as a whole. Tarn Crag is generally held to mark the transition from Lakeland to Pennine country. Away from the fierce western flank, the fell falls in long easy slopes of coarse grass and heather, with little outcropped rock in evidence.

The northern boundary of the fell is formed by the walkers pass from Longsleddale to Mosedale, which crosses a marshy depression at 1,555 ft (474 m). Mosedale beck has its source here, beginning its long journey north east to Swindale. Beyond the depression the ground rises again northward up Selside Brow to Branstree, the highest Lakeland top east of Longsleddale. South of Tarn Crag is another boggy col, separating the fell from its near twin, Grey Crag. This holds the diminutive Greycrag Tarn, actually a series of small pools on the bed of a larger body of water. The tarn empties into Longsleddale via Galeforth Gill, but issuing eastwards from the same marsh is Little Mosedale Beck.

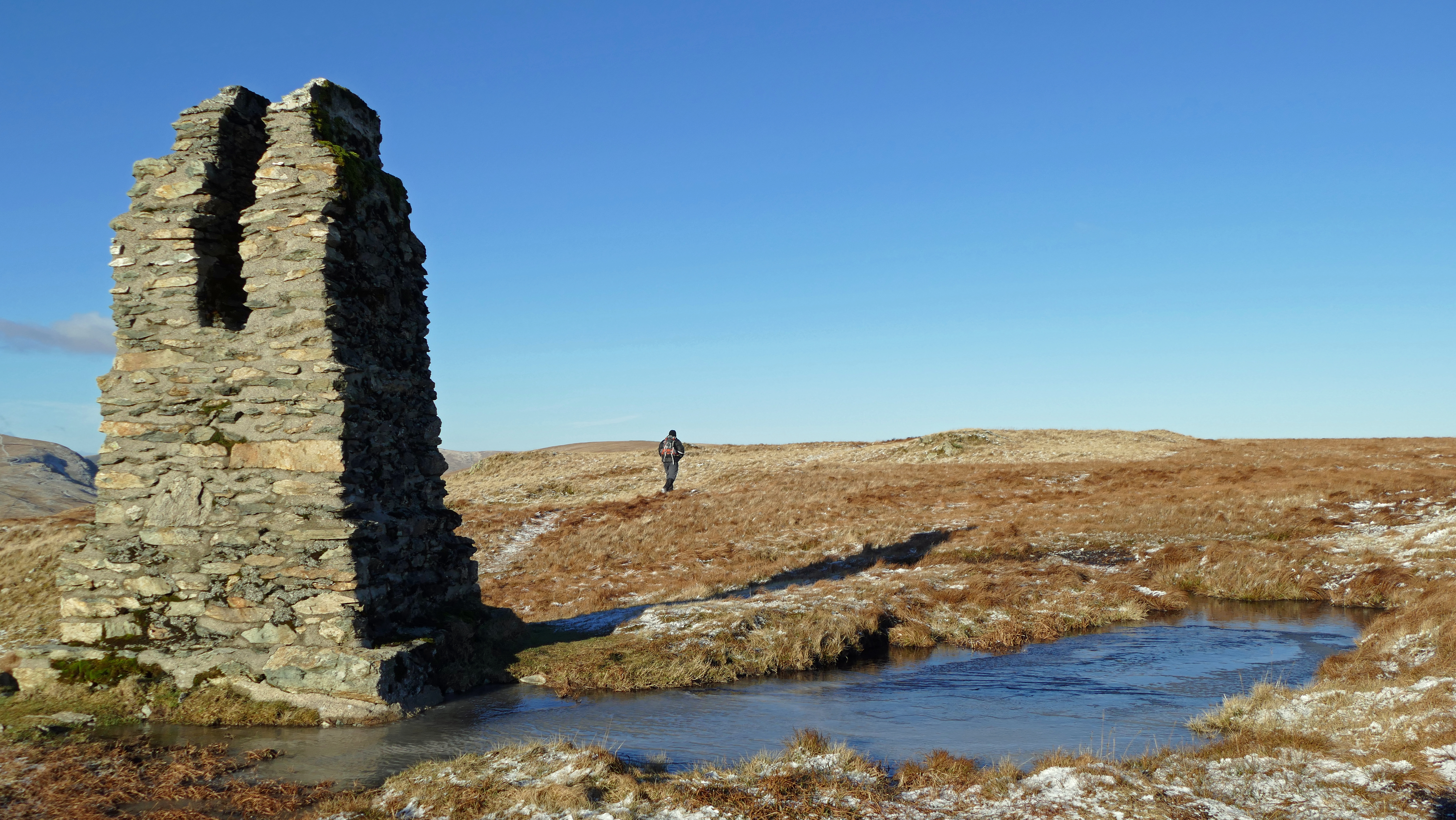
The surveying pillar on Tarn Crag

Mosedale and Little Mosedale Becks meet a mile to the north east of Tarn Crag, defining its eastern boundaries. A descending ridge makes for the confluence over Brunt Tongue, where a small patch of conifer plantation makes this point distinguishable from miles around. There are few other trees in this moorland landscape.

== Haweswater aqueduct ==
A fence crosses the fell just east of the summit and this runs along the Sleddale Fells from Selside Pike in the north to Grey Crag and its satellite, Harrop Pike in the south. This boundary provides an aid to route finding in poor conditions. Another man made feature near to the summit is the remains of a surveying pillar. This unusual stone and concrete construction is cleft at the top to provide a sight line and was originally surrounded by a wooden frame, now decayed. This is one of four such pillars built during the construction of the Haweswater aqueduct. Below Branstree and Tarn Crag is the first section of the pipeline carrying water from the reservoir toward Manchester. The tunnel, some 1,300 ft (400 m) below the summit, required 250 tons of gelignite for blasting, and when constructed in the 1930s was the longest such pipeline in Britain. It emerges into Longsleddale below Great Howe, where the spoil can still be seen.

== Summit ==
The view from the grassy summit is disappointing in terms of fells, but a wide vista from Morecambe Bay to the Pennines opens up in other directions. A portion of Windermere is visible to the south west.

== Ascents ==
Tarn Crag can be climbed from Longsleddale via Great Howe or from a point north of Buckbarrow Crag. Longer approaches from Swindale or Shap via Brunt Tongue are also possible.
