= Selside Pike =

Mountain in United Kingdom

- Location within the Lake District

Highest point
- Elevation: 655 m (2,149 ft)
- Prominence: c. 40 metres (130 ft)
- Parent peak: Branstree
- Listing: Wainwright, Nuttall, Hewitt
- Coordinates: 54°29′35″N 2°47′19″W

Geography
- Location: Cumbria, England
- Parent range: Lake District, Far Eastern Fells
- OS grid: NY490111
- Topo map: OS Explorer OL5, Explorer OL7

Selside Pike or Selside is a fell in the English Lake District. It stands between the valleys of Mardale and Swindale in the Far Eastern Fells.

== Topography ==
Mardale (Haweswater) and Swindale run parallel S-shaped courses, trending generally to the north east. Between them is a tract of high ground about two miles wide and five miles long. Branstree is the first fell on this ridge, followed by two more tops of similar height. The first at 2,207 feet (673 m) is unnamed on OS maps, although the name High Howes has been offered in at least one guidebook. Wainwright considered this to be a subsidiary of Branstree, and accorded separate fell status to the next summit, Selside Pike, in his Pictorial Guide to the Lakeland Fells. That convention is followed here.

The upper parts of Selside Pike are characterised by smooth grassy slopes and the top of the fell has a dome-like appearance from most angles. The lower slopes on the western side- falling to the shore of Haweswater- are steeper with tongues of scree in evidence. Two small conifer plantations on the shore stand above the submerged village of Mardale Green and the Dun Bull inn. These were lost when the lake was raised in the 1940s to provide drinking water supplies.

The eastern side of the fell forms the head of Swindale proper, the upper valley being known as Mosedale. Swindale is a classic U-shaped valley, its profile almost a square section, with a flat base and sheer walls. Selside Pike's eastern slopes fall gently to about the 600 m contour and then plunge over a wall of crag to the valley floor. Geordie Greathead Crag is the dominant feature and below this is the dry tarnbed of Dodd Bottom. Hobgrumble Gill falls down this face in a deep gully, separating Selside Pike from the north east ridge of High Howes. Above the crags the gill runs in a small hanging valley.

The ridge south westward to High Howes is grassy and broad, crossing a wet depression at Captain Whelter Bog. North eastwards from Selside Pike the ridge narrows, dropping over High Blake Dodd to the Mardale Corpse Road. Beyond this is Hare Shaw, 1,650 feet (500 m), standing at the head of an area of rough fell on either side of the Naddle Beck. This area was covered in Wainwright's The Outlying Fells of Lakeland.

== Corpse Road ==
The Corpse Road was originally used to carry the dead of Mardale to the nearest churchyard for burial. The route crosses into Swindale and then traverses further high ground to reach the village of Shap. The last such journey was made by John Holme of Brackenhow on 17 June 1736, by which time the right of burial had been granted to the tiny Holy Trinity church in Mardale Green. When, by 1936, the plans to raise Haweswater and submerge Mardale Green were finalised, the 100 or so burials made at Holy Trinity were disinterred and reburied at Shap.

== Summit ==
The summit has a large stone cairn while all around is grass. The view of the Lakeland fells is confined to the head of Mardale, but Haweswater, Shap and the Pennines present a fine open prospect.

== Ascents ==
Selside Pike can be climbed from Mardale via the Corpse road and High Blake Dodd. The same means of ascent can also be gained from Swindale, or the track up Mosedale can be used. There is no access for non-residents' cars to the last mile and a half (2 km) of the Swindale road.

== Panorama ==
The following Wanwrights are visible from the summit on a clear day:

1. Grey Crag, 170.1°, 2.5m
2. Branstree, 226.7°, 1.1m
3. Harter Fell (Mardale), 238.4°, 2.2m
4. Mardale Ill Bell, 255.5°, 2.7m
5. Thornthwaite Crag, 258.8°, 3.7m
6. High Street, 269.4°, 3.0m
7. St Sunday Crag, 279.7°, 7.7m
8. Nethermost Pike, 281.1°, 9.3m
9. Kidsty Pike, 287.5°, 2.8m
10. Rampsgill Head, 289.3°, 3.1m
11. High Raise (Martindale), 297.7°, 3.0m
12. Wether Hill (north top), 327.8°, 4.1m
13. Loadpot Hill, 333.0°, 4.8m

This is the most circumscribed view of any Wainwright in terms of other Wainwrights visible, although the prospect towards the Pennines and Yorkshire Dales is very extensive.
