= Mosedale Beck (Swindale) =

Stream in Cumbria, England

Coordinates: 54°30′02″N 2°46′01″W

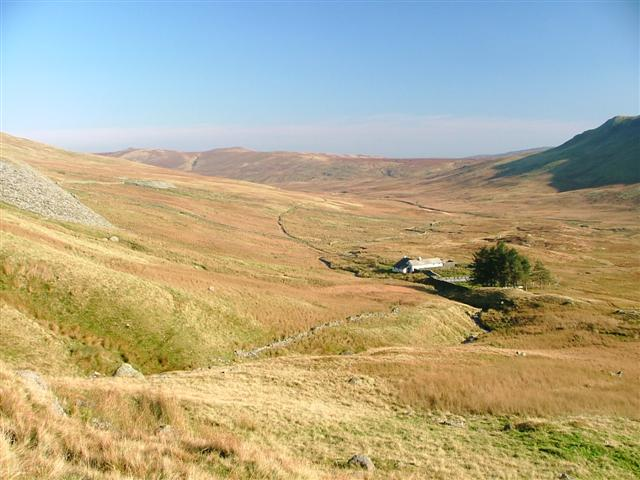
Mosedale with Mosedale Cottage bothy

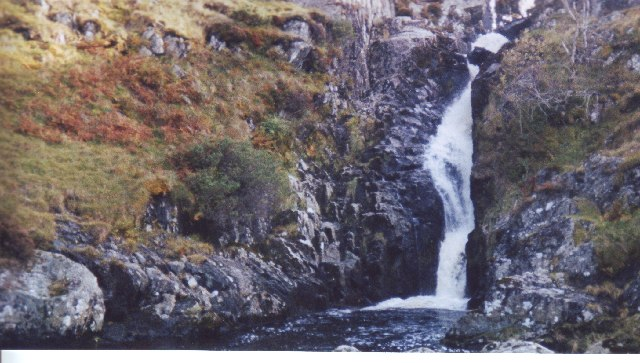
The Forces waterfalls

Mosedale Beck is a stream in Cumbria, England, which runs between Tarn Crag and Branstree, flowing north to join Swindale Beck at Swindale Head; Swindale Beck then flows north east to join the River Lowther near Rosgill, between Shap and Bampton.

The upper valley of Mosedale Beck is broad and boggy, containing a single building: Mosedale Cottage, a bothy supported by the Mountain Bothies Association, and whitewashed to make it more clearly visible in poor weather. The beck then changes character and forms waterfalls called Forces Falls or The Forces as it drops to the valley of Swindale.
