= Mosedale Viaduct =

Railway bridge in Cumbria, England

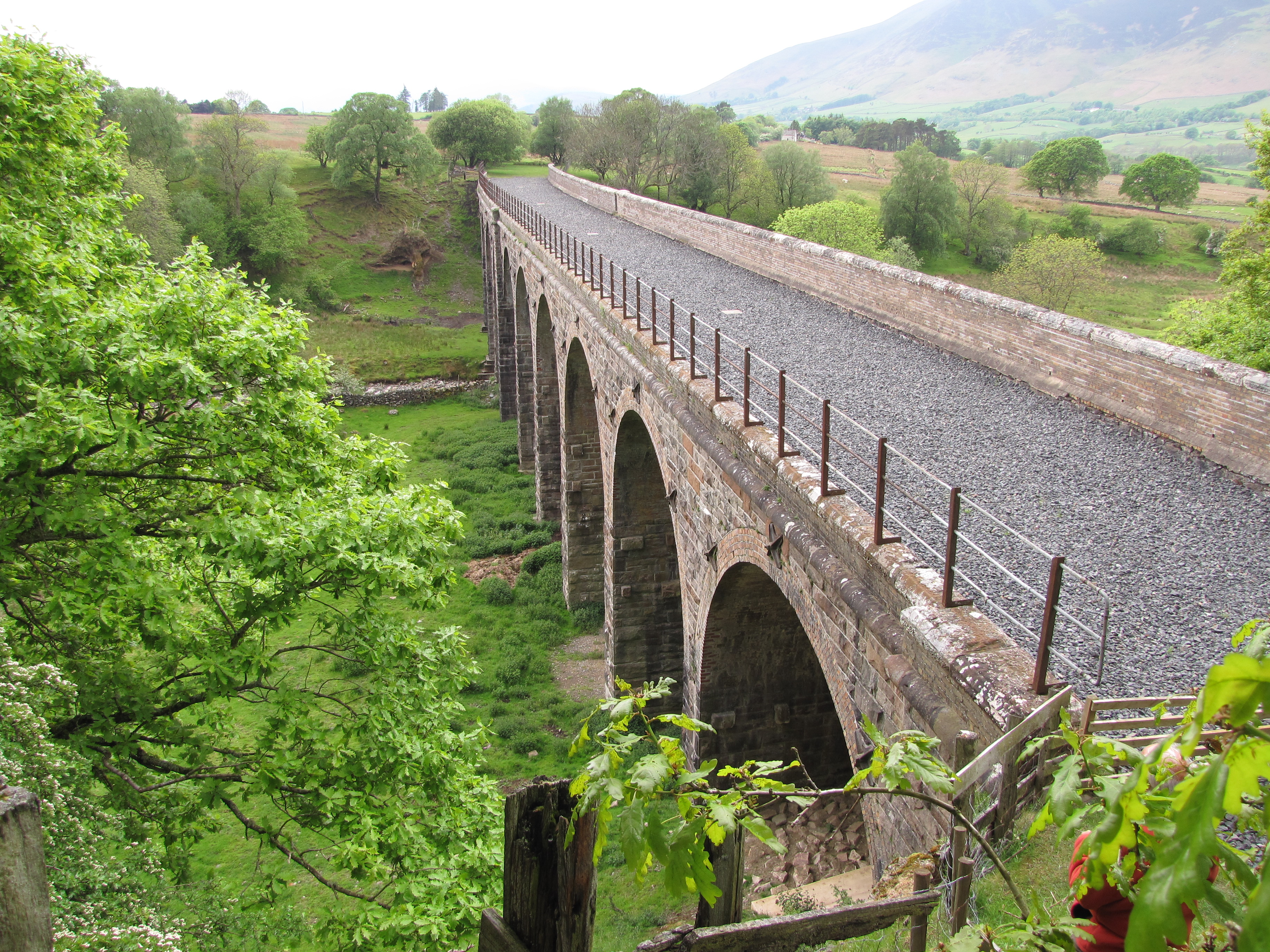
- The viaduct in 2010
- Coordinates: 54°37′25″N 3°00′01″W

The Mosedale Viaduct carried the Cockermouth, Keswick and Penrith Railway over Mosedale Beck until its closure in 1972.

Building work on the viaduct began in 1862, and the first test train crossed it in 1864. It is made of stone and has 12 arches, and is just over 140 yards (420 feet (130 m)) long. It was built single-track but was extended to the north in 1900 to accommodate two tracks.

In 1997 British Rail Property Board agreed to defer plans to demolish the viaduct, in the light of proposals for the line to be reopened.

It is featured in S1 Ep 4 of Walking Britain's Lost Railways.
