= Mardale =

English glacial valley in the Lake District

Coordinates: 54.510°N 2.810°W

Mardale /mɑːrdeɪl/ is a glacial valley in the Lake District, in northern England. The valley used to have a hamlet at its head, called Mardale Green, but this village was submerged in the late 1930s when the water level of the valley's lake, Haweswater, was raised to form Haweswater Reservoir by Manchester Corporation.

== Demolition ==
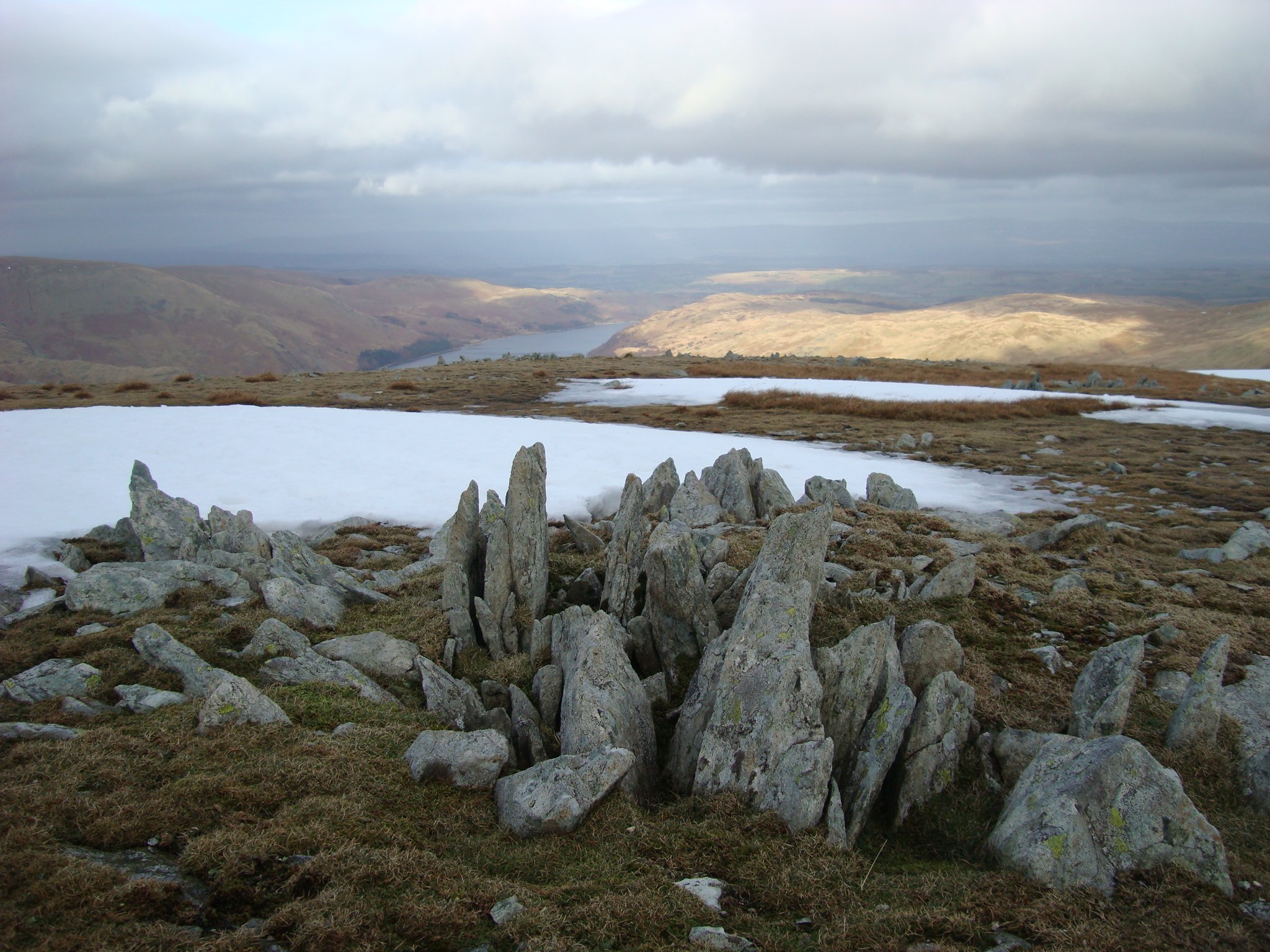
Mardale

Most of the village's buildings were blown up by the Royal Engineers, who used them for demolition practice. The exception was the small church, which could accommodate only 75 people, and had an all-ticket congregation for its last service. It was then dismantled in April 1937, stone by stone, and the stones and windows were re-used to build the water take-off tower which is situated along the Western shore of the reservoir. Some 97 sets of remains were disinterred from the churchyard and transferred to Shap. The ruins of the abandoned village occasionally reappear when the water level in the reservoir is low.

Alfred Wainwright protested bitterly about the loss of Mardale in his series of pictorial guides to the Lakeland fells, having first visited it in 1930, and still wrote of the “rape of Mardale” in his very last book. Others, however, praised the creation of a new and impressive mass of water, especially as viewed from the fells.

== Dam and fell access ==
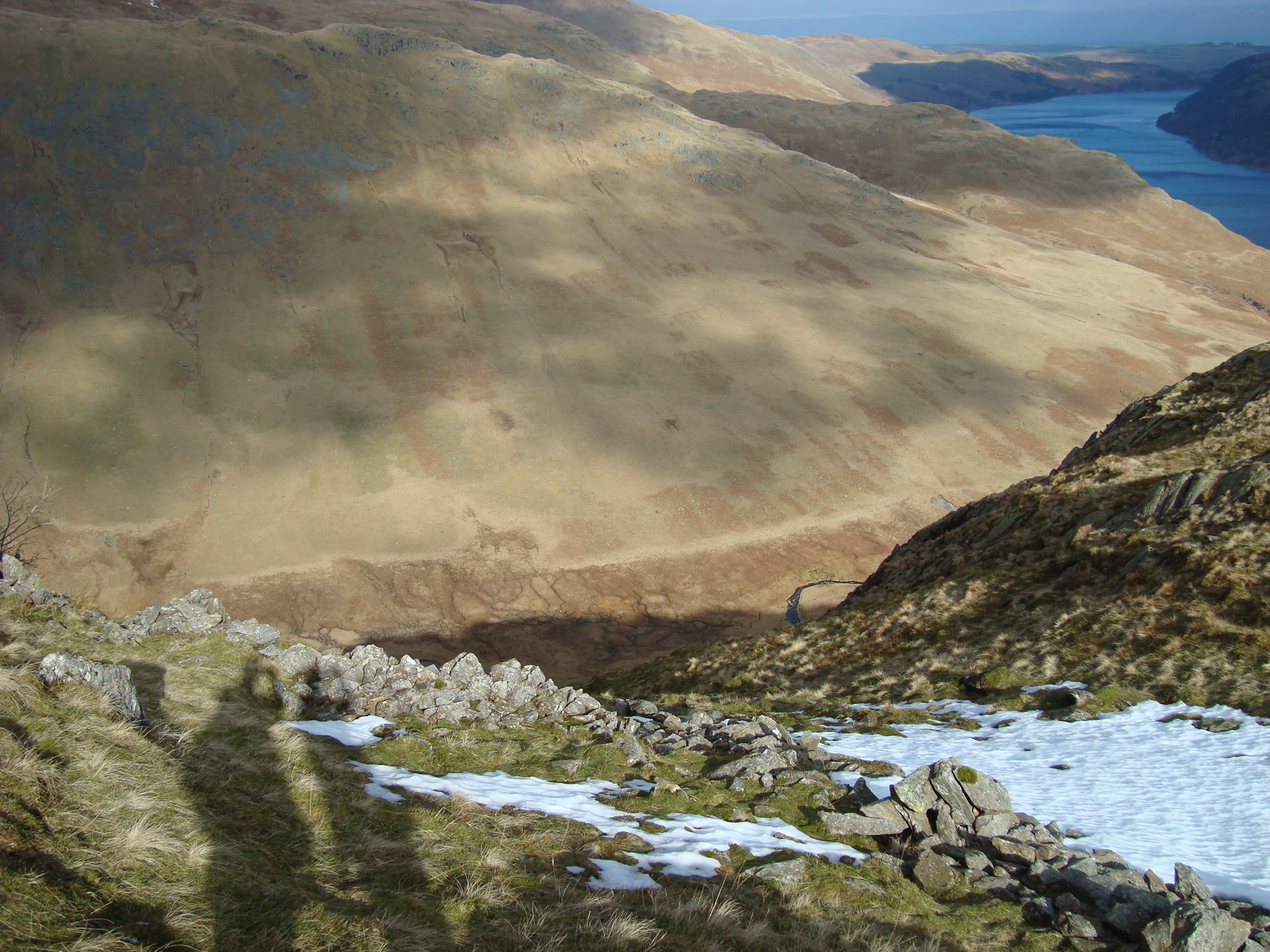
Mardale

Despite his protests, Wainwright was impressed by the dimensions of the Mardale dam – 90 feet (27 m) in height; 1,550 ft (470 m) in length – which he noted as the earliest hollow buttress dam in the world.

In response to the submerging of the village, Manchester Corporation provided a new access road that runs for four miles (6 km) along the south-eastern side of the reservoir to a car park at Gatescarth. From here ascents of the peaks surrounding the head of the valley, such as Harter Fell, High Street and Kidsty Pike may be made.

== Historical and cultural associations ==
- A refugee from King John, Sir Hugh Hulme, settled in the valley in the early 13th C., and was popularly known as the King of Mardale.
- Letitia Elizabeth Landon gives an emotional response to the remote grandeur of Mardale Head in her poetical illustration of that name, to an engraving of a painting by Thomas Allom in Fisher's Drawing Room Scrap Book, 1835.
- Mardale featured as “Marrisdale” in Mrs Humphry Ward’s Victorian novel Robert Elsmere; and was also described by her contemporary as a novelist, Eliza Lynn Linton: “seen in the calm of evening, with every mountain form repeated with tenfold force of line and colour in the black lake...it is something well worth travelling far to see”.
- The flooding of Mardale is the subject of Sarah Hall's 2002 historical novel Haweswater (Faber, ISBN 978-0571209309). Hall's novel won the Commonwealth Writers First Book Award.
- The clarinet quintet Mardale Changes (2005) by Nicholas Simpson is based on the sound of the bells of the sunken Mardale church.

== See also ==
- Capel Celyn (village 'drowned' to create a reservoir)
- Derwent, Derbyshire
- Riggindale
- Chew Valley Lake (where the village of Moreton lies underwater)
- West End, Yorkshire (village 'drowned' to create a reservoir)
