= Heaton Park Reservoir =

Reservoir in Greater Manchester, England

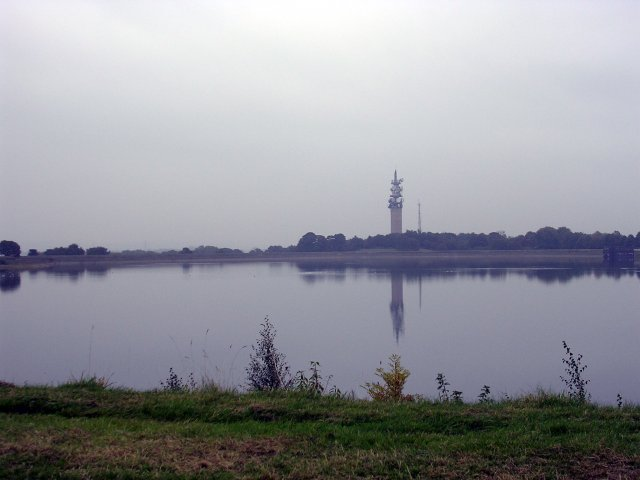
- Looking in an easterly direction across Heaton Park Reservoir. Heaton Park BT Tower can be seen in the distance.

- Location within Greater Manchester
- Location: Greater Manchester, England
- Coordinates: 53°32′27″N 2°15′49″W

Heaton Park Reservoir is a granite sided reservoir in the North-West of England, on the border between the City of Manchester and Bury and is owned by United Utilities, and can be found within the grounds of Heaton Park. Heaton Park BT Tower lies on the banks of the reservoir, which is close to Junction 18 of the M60 motorway.

An aqueduct carrying water from Haweswater, in the Lake District, to Manchester terminates at Heaton Park Reservoir. The aqueduct was inaugurated in June 1955, is 82 miles (132 km) in length and carries up to 100 million imperial gallons (450,000 m^{3}) of water per day under the force of gravity.

In 2008, a £3.5 million Ultra-Violet (UV) disinfection plant was installed at Heaton Park water treatment works to meet water quality requirements. The UV building was designed to nestle within the embankment of the existing service reservoir.

== Ornithology ==
The reservoir is known for its wintering wildfowl. Amongst the most recorded are tufted duck, goldeneye, goosander and common teal. Other, less common sightings included the lesser scaup, the ring-necked duck, the Slavonian grebe, the black-necked grebe, the long-tailed duck, the Leach's petrel and the European honey buzzard. Due to a nearby landfill site, the reservoir also plays host to a large gull population including yellow-legged gulls, Caspian gulls, Iceland gulls and Kumlien's gulls.
