= Harter Fell (Mardale) =

Mountain in United Kingdom

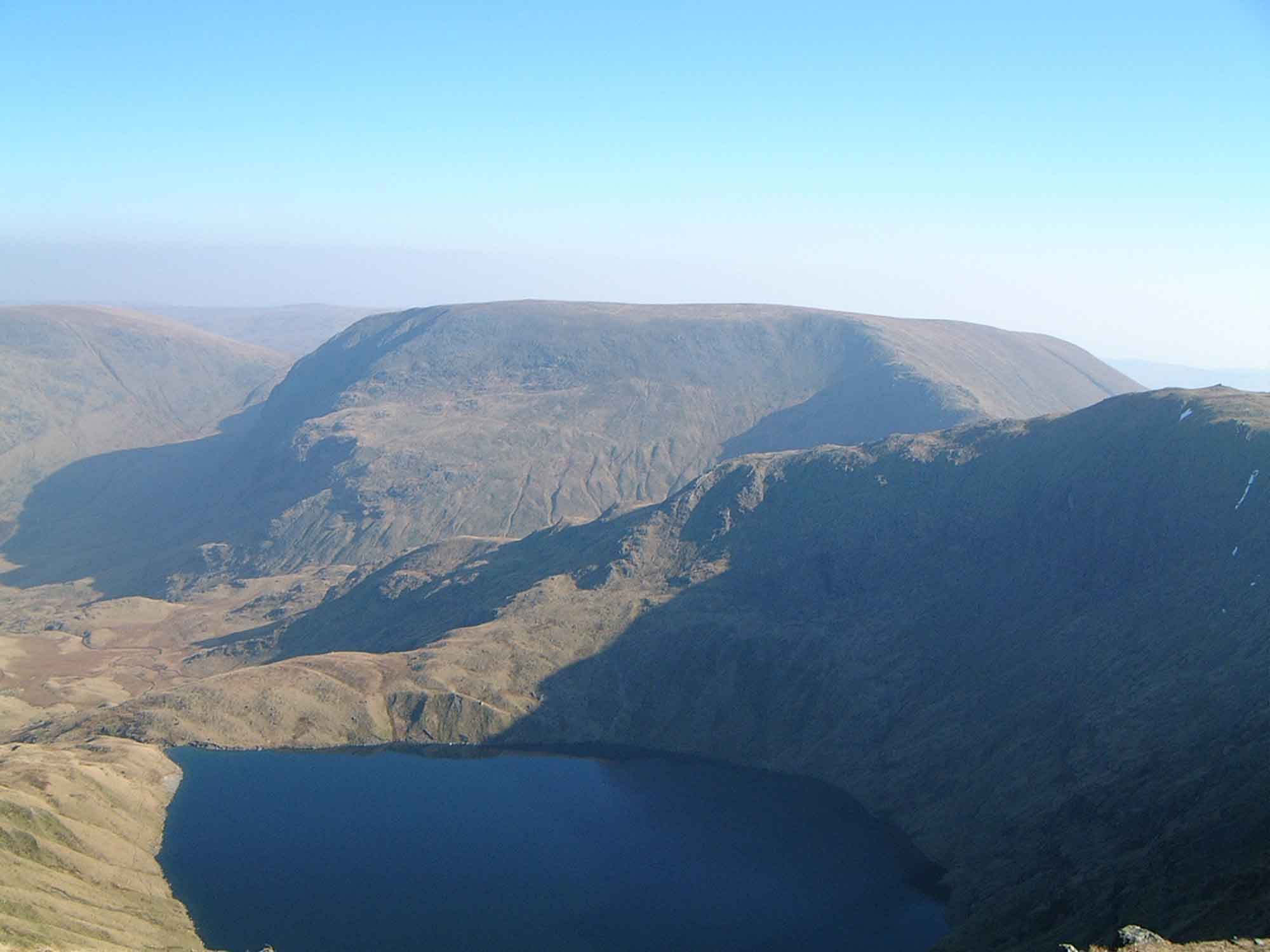
- Harter Fell seen from High Street with Blea Water in the foreground

Highest point
- Elevation: 778 m (2,552 ft)
- Prominence: 149 m (489 ft)
- Parent peak: High Street
- Listing: Hewitt, Wainwright, Nuttall
- Coordinates: 54°28′34″N 2°50′06″W

Geography
- Location within the Lake District
- Location: Cumbria, England
- Parent range: Lake District, Far Eastern Fells
- OS grid: NY459093
- Topo map: OS Explorer OL5, Explorer OL7

Harter Fell is a fell in the far eastern part of the English Lake District. The summit at lies the meeting point of three ridges, and Harter Fell forms the head of three valleys: Mardale, Longsleddale and the valley of the River Kent.

== Topography ==
In plan section the summit area forms a horseshoe, open to the south east. This ridge is narrow and grassy, with a relatively new fence in place. There are subsidiary tops on both horns of the horseshoe. The southern ridge passes over The Knowe and then Brown Howe, before connecting to Kentmere Pike. The eastern branch includes the rocky top of Little Harter Fell (2,234 feet or 681 metres), and Adam Seat (2,185 feet or 666 metres) which is marked by a prominent boundary stone. This ridge continues down to Gatescarth Pass before rising again to Branstree.

Connecting to the centre of the summit horseshoe, producing a shape not unlike a tuning fork in plan, is Harter Fell's third ridge. This starts lower down the fell-side and cannot be seen from the summit. This ridge is all together rockier in character and leads swiftly down to Nan Bield Pass for onward connections to Mardale Ill Bell and High Street.

The western slopes of the fell above Kentmere Reservoir are moderately steep, with an area of historic landslip surrounding Dry Gill. A low subsidiary ridge juts out into Kentmere, separating it from the valley of Ullstone Gill. This is named for The Ullstone, a prominent erratic boulder.

The summit horseshoe of Harter Fell forms the head of Wren Gill, the main headwater of the River Sprint in Longsleddale. At Wrengill Quarry near the base of the slope, the Gill drops into sinkholes, reappearing from the ground a few yards lower down. The slopes on this south eastern side of the fell are gentle and generally grassy.

To the north above the head of Mardale, Harter Fell shows a different character. Extensive crags, unnamed on Ordnance Survey maps, drop 1,300 feet (400 m) to the valley. Further crags fringe the descending ridge to Nan Bield. Below these is the beautiful mountain tarn of Small Water. This corrie tarn, with a depth of around 50 feet (15 m) has brown trout and perch.

== Ascents ==
The walkers' passes of Nan Bield and Gatescarth provided historic trade routes from Mardale to Kentmere and Longsleddale respectively. With the submergence of Mardale Green village beneath Haweswater reservoir in the 1940s, their original purpose has died, but both routes still provide good access for fellwalkers and are the easiest ways onto Harter Fell. The upper sections still bear the original zig-zags over steep ground. The fell is most frequently climbed from Mardale, as there is road access along the shore of Haweswater. Harter Fell summit is 1 mile or 1.6 kilometres southwest and 1,800 feet or 550 metres above the carpark at the head of the reservoir. Crags block a direct ascent, however, and Harter Fell is thus normally climbed via Gatescarth Pass to the east of the summit, or Nan Bield Pass to the west. These two passes also provide the easiest access from Kentmere or Longsleddale.

A longer route from the Kent valley follows the ridge that separates it from Longsleddale, taking in Kentmere Pike on the way. This may form part of the Kentmere Horseshoe walk which also includes the Ill Bell ridge. An ascent of Harter Fell may also be combined with fells such as Branstree, Mardale Ill Bell and High Street to form a high-level circuit of Mardale from the road end. Finally, direct ascents from Longsleddale can also be made up the grassy slopes above Wrengill Quarry.

== Summit ==
As well as a pile of stones, the summit cairn of Harter Fell carries many pieces of ironwork salvaged from the fence. Some of these resemble upended pitchforks, and when encountered unexpectedly on a misty day, the effect is faintly nightmarish. A second cairn to the north carries similar decoration. The view is good all round and can be improved by moving to the rim of the crags, bringing the full length of Haweswater into sight.

== Listing ==
Harter Fell was originally listed as a Marilyn in Alan Dawson's The Relative Hills of Britain, but it was later found not to have the required 150 m of relative height, missing out by 1 metre.
