= Mosedale Beck (Wast Water) =

Stream in Cumbria, England

Coordinates: 54.4582°N 3.2608°W

Mosedale Beck with Pillar in background

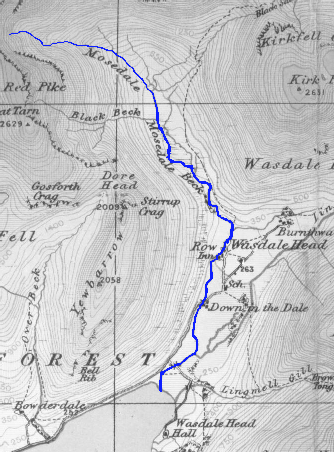
A map of Mosedale Beck (shown in blue) from 1925

Mosedale Beck is a stream in Cumbria which runs into Wast Water, which is the deepest lake in England.

Mosedale Beck rises in Little Scoat Fell, it then flows south west until it reaches Ritson's Force waterfall. It then turns to the south and flows through the hamlet of Wasdale Head. It then flows through Down-in-the-Dale before it empties into Wast Water near the parallel Lingmell Beck.

The Mosedale Horseshoe is a celebrated mountain walk around Mosedale: starting at Wasdale Head it includes Yewbarrow, Red Pike, Scoat Fell, and Pillar.

== Tributaries ==
- Gatherstone Beck
- Black Beck
- Fogmire Beck
- Lingmell Beck
