= Branstree =

Fell in the Lake District, Cumbria, England

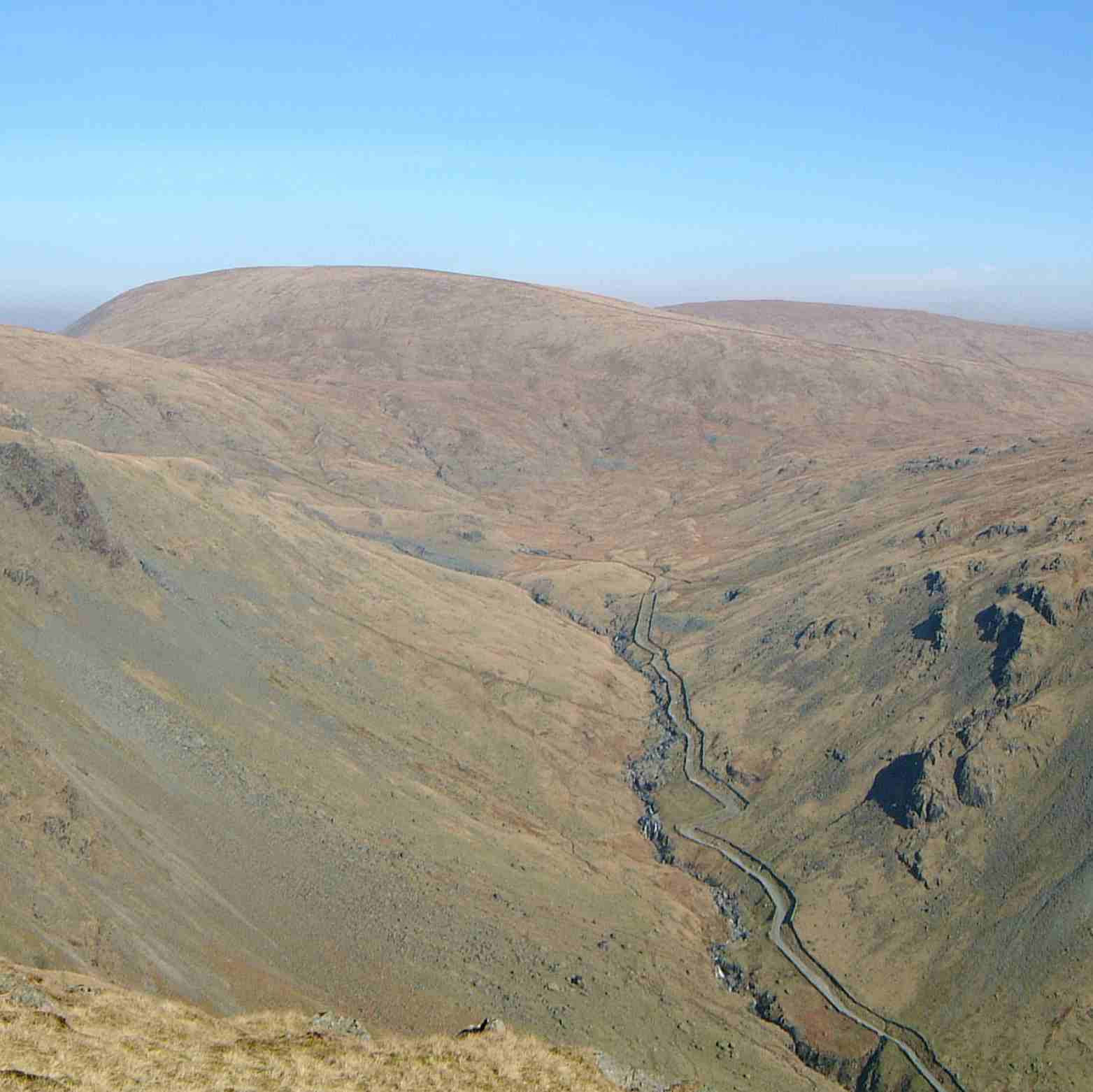
- Branstree seen from Goat Scar to the South. The Gatescarth Pass track is seen in the valley below

Highest point
- Elevation: 713 m (2,339 ft)
- Prominence: 137 m (449 ft)
- Parent peak: Harter Fell
- Listing: Hewitt, Nuttall, Wainwright
- Coordinates: 54°28′58″N 2°48′31″W

Naming
- English translation: corruption of "Brant Street"
- Language of name: Old English
- Pronunciation: /ˈbrænstriː/

Geography
- Location within the Lake District
- Location: Cumbria, England
- Parent range: Lake District, Far Eastern Fells
- OS grid: NY477100
- Topo map: OS Explorer OL5, Explorer OL7

Listed summits of Branstree
Name	Grid ref	Height	Status
Branstree NE Top (High Howes)	NY487103	673 m (2,208 ft)	Nuttall

Branstree is a fell in the Far Eastern part of the English Lake District. It overlooks the valley of Mardale and Haweswater Reservoir.

== Topography ==
A circuit of high fells surrounds the head of Mardale, beginning at High Raise in the north and curving around over High Street and Harter Fell to Branstree and Selside Pike in the south. As the ridge is travelled in this direction, the countryside changes from crag and scree to more rounded fellsides clothed with grass. Branstree is the first fell moving east where grass prevails, and a Pennine character begins to take over from Lakeland. From many directions the fell appears as a smooth domed hill with a wide top.

Branstree has a connection southwestward to Harter Fell: the ridge crosses Gatescarth Pass at 1,900 feet (580 m) which was the route of pedestrian traffic between Mardale and Longsleddale, its well-graded zig-zags still used by walkers today. The ancient trade between the two valleys ended when the level of Haweswater was raised in the 1940s, submerging the village of Mardale Green beneath the reservoir.

Eastward from Branstree is a wide swathe of rough moorland between the parallel valleys of Mardale and Swindale. This runs for about five miles (8 km) before petering out at the valley of the River Lowther. Immediately east of Branstree is a second fell of similar height, 2,207 feet (673 m), and character, which is unnamed on OS maps. At least one guidebook has suggested 'High Howes' as a name, but Wainwright considered this to be a part of Branstree rather than a separate fell. Across Captain Whelter Bog to the north of the unnamed summit is Selside Pike, the final Wainwright in that direction.

South from Branstree a further ridge connects to Tarn Crag, passing between the head of Mosedale and the headwaters of Longsleddale. This depression at 1,650 feet (500 m) is broad and boggy. Mosedale is the upper hanging valley of Swindale, running westwards from the apparent dalehead. Nestled against the lower slopes of Branstree near the head of Mosedale is Mosedale Cottage. This shepherd's bothy, two miles (3 1/4 km) from the nearest road, is only inhabited occasionally. Its whitewashed walls provide an important navigational reference in deteriorating weather. Behind the cottage are the remains of a large quarry.

The eastern subsidiary summit of Howes is the subject of a chapter of Wainwright's book The Outlying Fells of Lakeland.

== Haweswater Aqueduct ==
In the depression between Branstree and High Howes is a small tarn and the remains of a survey pillar. This unusual stone and concrete construction is cleft at the top to provide a sight line and was originally surrounded by a wooden frame, now decayed. This is one of four such pillars built during the construction of the Haweswater aqueduct. Below Branstree, Tarn Crag and Great Howe is the first section of the pipeline carrying water from the reservoir toward Manchester. The tunnel, some 1,300 feet (400 m) below this point, required 250 tons of gelignite for blasting, and when constructed in the 1930s was the longest such pipeline in Britain. It emerges into Longsleddale below the southern end of Great Howe, where the spoil can still be seen.

== Summit ==
The summit is broad and too flat to allow good all round views. These are further restricted by the higher fells to the west, but there is a fine prospect to the Pennines and Howgill Fells. Walls and fences follow the ridges from Gatesgarth, Tarn Crag and Selside Pike, meeting near the summit. A small cairn is situated a little to the north. A better view of Mardale, and certainly a better foreground, can be seen from Artlecrag Pike. This subsidiary top (Branstree NE Top), a little to the north has two fine columnar cairns built from the nearby outcrop of flaky rocks.

== Ascents ==
Ascents can be made from the three surrounding valleys. Gatescarth Pass provides access from the roadends of Mardale and Longsleddale. Alternative routes climb from the vicinity of Mosedale cottage and from the shore of Haweswater near the start of the Mardale Corpse Road.
