= Mosedale Beck (Glenderamackin) =

River in Cumbria, England

Coordinates: 54.6150°N 2.9956°W

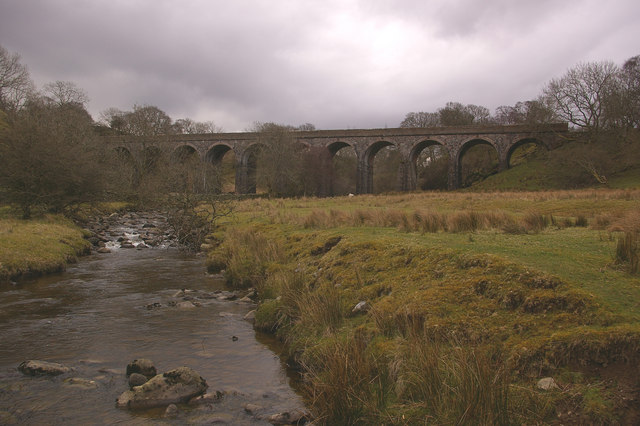
Mosedale Beck, looking downstream towards Mosedale Viaduct

Mosedale Beck is a river in Cumbria, England, which rises on the northern slopes of Great Dodd and flows north east, to the south of Clough Head before joining the River Glenderamackin to the east of Threlkeld village. This then flows west, alongside the A66 road south of Blencathra, to form the River Greta which flows into the River Derwent.

Shortly before joining the Glendaramackin, Mosedale Beck is crossed by the Mosedale Viaduct of the former Cockermouth, Keswick and Penrith Railway, now a footpath.
