= Haweswater Reservoir =

Reservoir in Cumbria, England

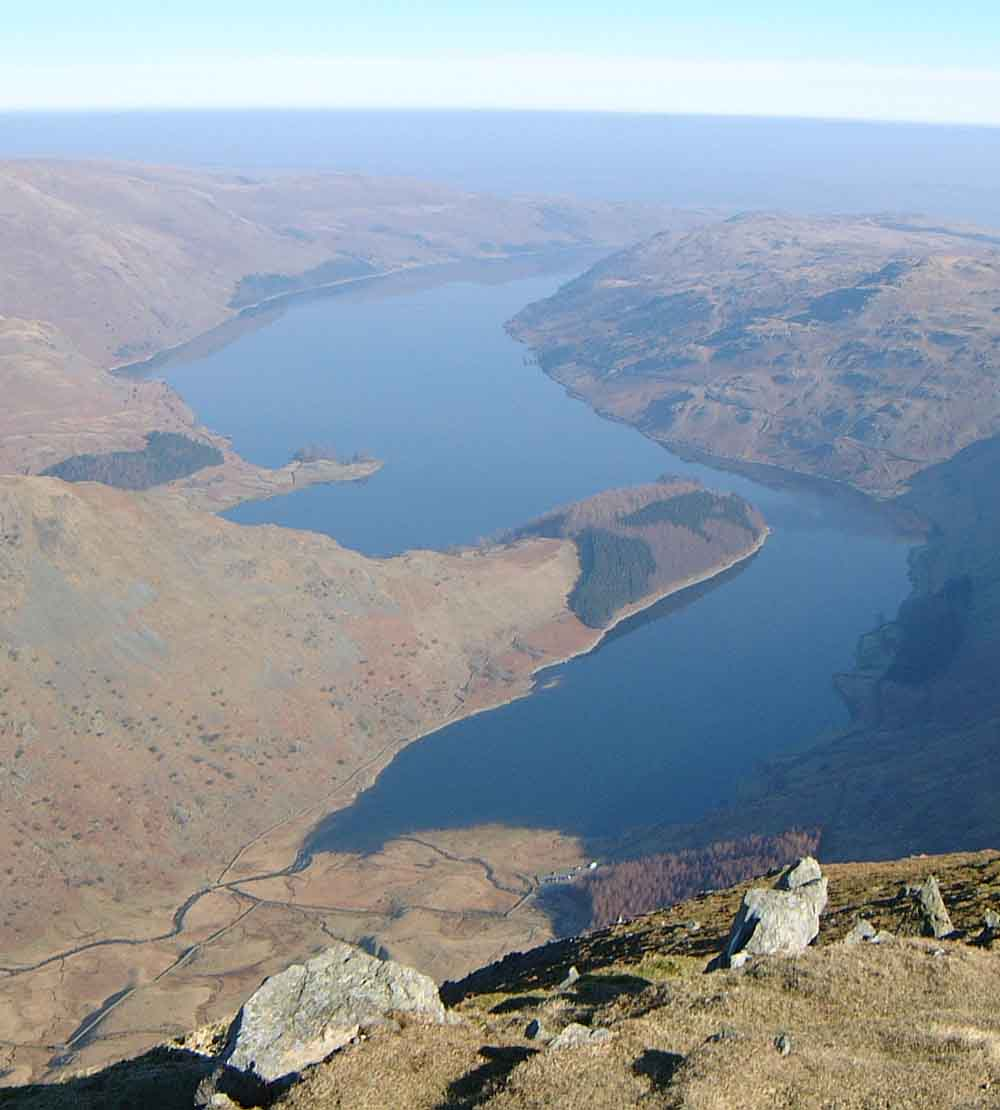
- Reservoir seen from Harter Fell, Mardale

- Location in the Lake District National Park Location in Eden, Cumbria
- Location: Lake District, Cumbria
- Coordinates: 54°31′08″N 2°48′17″W
- Type: reservoir, natural lake
- Primary inflows: Mardale Beck, Riggindale Beck
- Primary outflows: Haweswater Beck
- Basin countries: England
- Max. length: 6.7 km (4.2 mi)
- Max. width: 900 m (3,000 ft)
- Surface area: 3.9 km^{2} (1.5 sq mi)
- Average depth: 23.4 m (77 ft)
- Max. depth: 57 m (187 ft)
- Water volume: 84 billion litres (18×10^{9} imp gal)
- Residence time: 500 days
- Surface elevation: 246 m (807 ft)
- Islands: 1

Haweswater is a reservoir in the valley of Mardale, Cumbria in the Lake District, England. The man-made reservoir, which was created by damming the original natural lake, was completed by 1935. It raised the water level in the valley by 29 m (95 ft).

The valley was dammed by Manchester Corporation, after it had obtained permission from the UK Parliament through the passing of the Manchester Corporation Act 1919 (9 & 10 Geo. 5. c. cxix). The local act of Parliament was for the supply of drinking water to Manchester. However, the decision caused public outcry because the farming villages of Measand and Mardale Green would be lost when Mardale was flooded. Water is transferred to the Heaton Park Reservoir via the Haweswater Aqueduct.

Construction work on the dam began in 1929. Haweswater was completely flooded by 1935. The reservoir is now owned and managed by United Utilities. It supplies about 25% of North West England's water supply.

== Toponymy ==
Haweswater is derived from Old Norse or Old English. 'Hafr's lake' refers to the personal Norse name 'Hafr' or in Old English 'Hæfer'; 'water' or 'wæter' is the dominant term for 'lake' in old English.

== Geology ==
Haweswater is the location of a caldera volcano succession.

== History ==
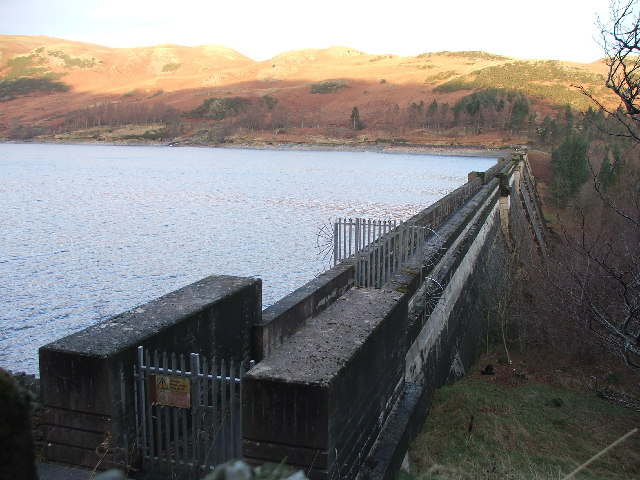
Parapet atop the Haweswater Reservoir

Haweswater was originally a natural lake about 4 km (2.5 mi) long. A tongue of land at Measand divided the lake almost in two. The upper and lower reaches of the lake were known as High Water and Low Water.

In 1929 work started to build the dam wall across the valley floor. At the time of construction, its design was considered to be at the forefront of civil engineering technology because it was the world's first hollow buttress dam. The wall would be created from 44 separate buttressed units joined by flexible joints.

When the dam was completed by 1935, it measured 470 m (1,540 ft) long and 27.5 m (90 ft) high. A 1.4 m (4 ft 7 in) wide parapet runs atop the length of the dam. Building supplies were brought to the site from the adjoining valleys of Heltondale and Swindale. A purpose-built 5.5 mi (8.9 km) concrete road was constructed between the work site and Shap for the transportation of building materials.

When the valley was flooded, the dam raised the water level by 29 m (95 ft). This created a reservoir 6 km (3.7 mi) long and up to 600 m (2,000 ft) across at its widest point. It holds up to 84 billion litres (18×10^{9} imp gal) of water.

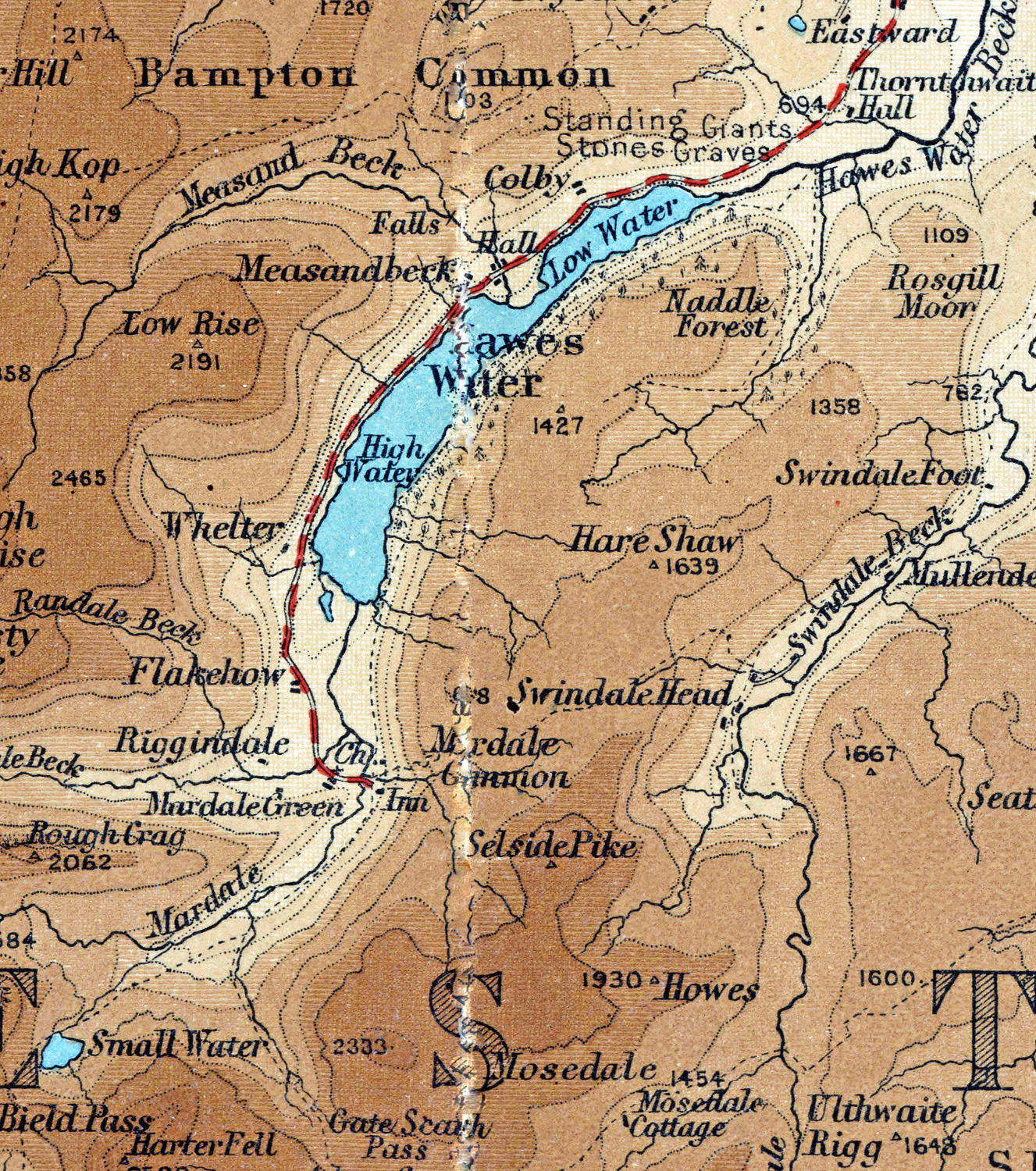
1924 map of Haweswater before it was enlarged. Note Mardale Green and the original road on the west bank.

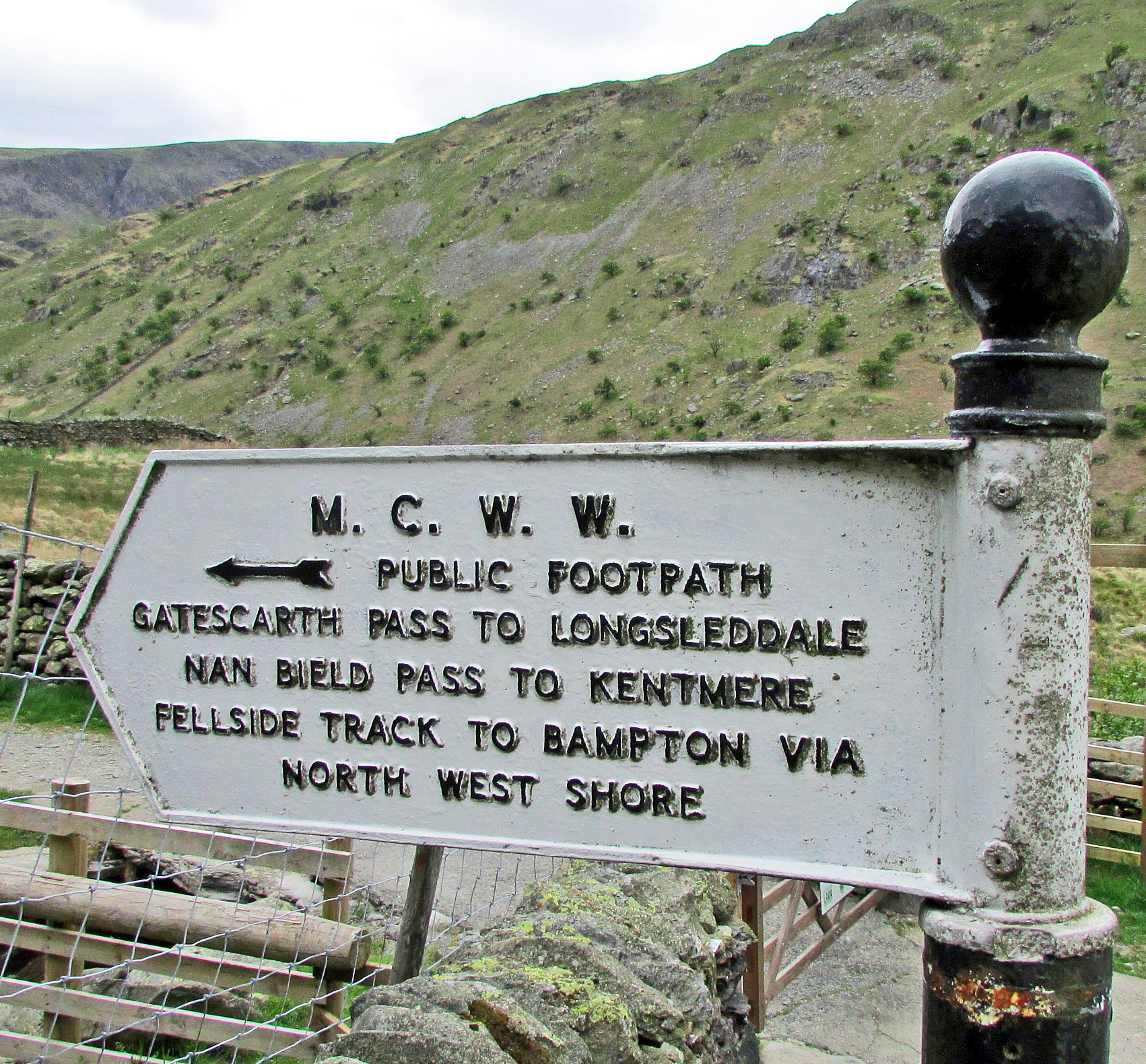
1930s Manchester Corporation Waterworks (MCWW) footpath sign at the western end car park

All the farms and dwellings of the villages of Mardale Green and Measand were demolished while the dam wall was being built, as well as the centuries-old Dun Bull Inn at Mardale Green. The village church was dismantled and the stone used in constructing the dam; all the bodies in the churchyard were exhumed and re-buried at Shap. When the water in the reservoir is low, the remains of the submerged village of Mardale Green can still be seen, including stone walls and the village bridge.

Manchester Corporation built a new road along the eastern side of the lake to replace the flooded highway lower in the valley, and the Haweswater Hotel was constructed midway down the length of the reservoir as a replacement for the Dun Bull. The road continues to the western end of Haweswater, to a car park, a popular starting point for a path to the surrounding fells of Harter Fell, Branstree and High Street.

== Wildlife ==
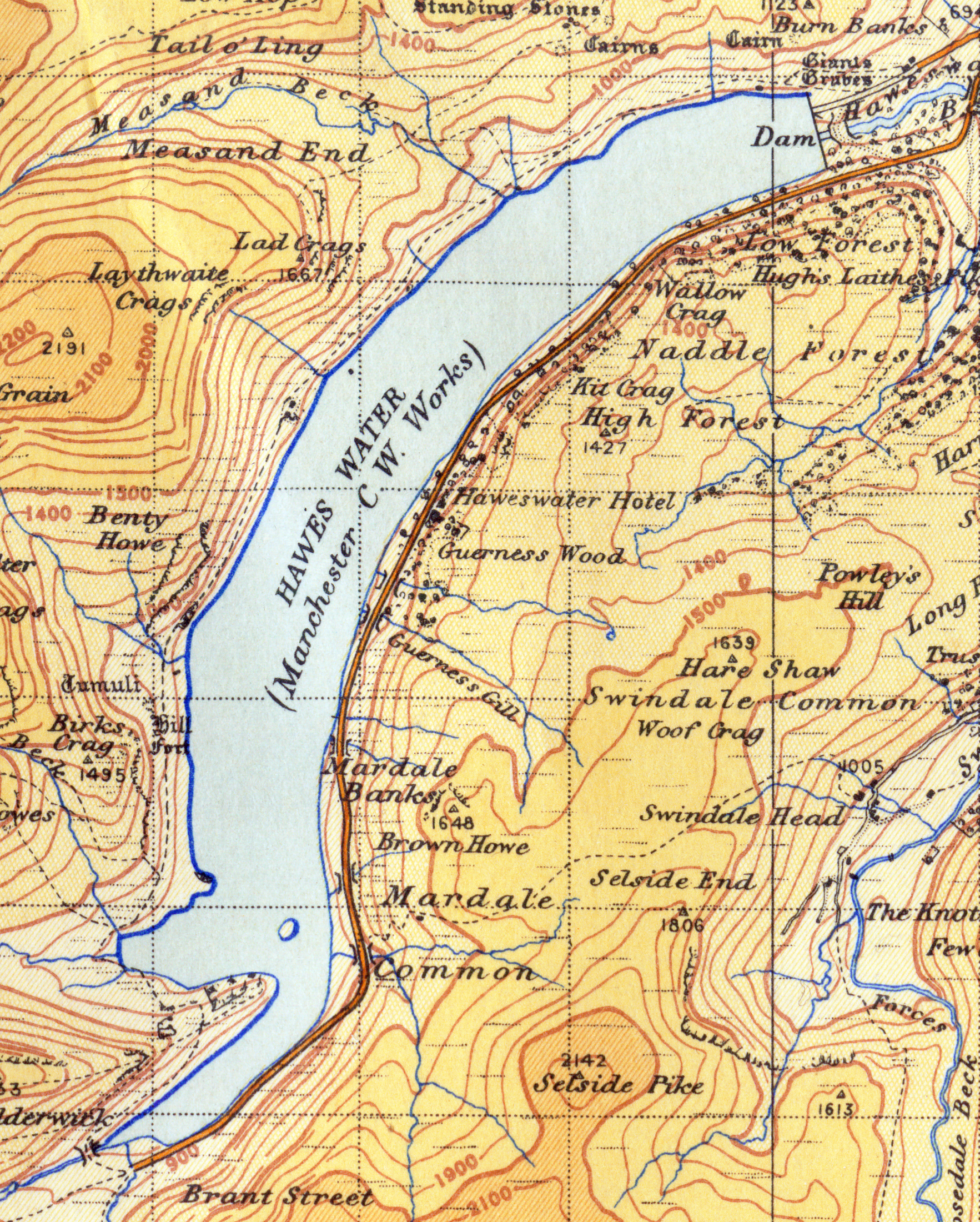
A map of Haweswater Reservoir from 1948

=== Fish ===
A species of schelly, from the Salmon family which is endemic to four lakes in the Lake District, resides in Haweswater. It is believed to have lived there since the last Ice Age. However, the population in Haweswater is in decline. Cormorants have been culled to protect the endangered fish. However, analysis of reservoir management data over a 30-year period (1961–1991) has revealed that the decline of the schelly population is also associated with increased water abstraction and reduced water levels.

=== RSPB ===
The Royal Society for the Protection of Birds (RSPB) first became involved at Haweswater because of the presence of golden eagles – the first to return to England in over 170 years. The organisation currently leases two farms in the area and has rights to their common land.

Until 2015, Haweswater was the only place in England where a golden eagle was resident. A pair of eagles first nested in the valley of Riggindale in 1969, and the male and female of the pairing changed several times over the years, during which 16 chicks were produced. The last female bird disappeared in April 2004, leaving the male alone. There was an RSPB viewpoint in the valley for people wishing to see the eagle. The last sighting was in November 2015, and it was reported in 2016 that the 20-year-old bird might have died of natural causes.

Since 2012, the RSPB has leased two farms from the landowner United Utilities. The aim is to combine the improvement of wildlife habitats and water quality, with running a viable sheep farm. Moorland and woodland habitats are being improved for birds as well as the rare small mountain ringlet butterfly. Measures include grip blocking, where the water level of drainage ditches is raised to encourage re-vegetation and reduce erosion, heather replanting, and juniper woodland planting (especially in the ghylls).

The RSPB have established the largest native tree and plant nursery in the Lake District. Seed is collected from the existing plants and trees on-site, grown in the nursery and planted to restore the landscape.

== Literary references ==
Hawes Water is described in Anthony Trollope's novel Can You Forgive Her? (1864).

Lake District writer and fell walker Alfred Wainwright had this to say on the construction of the Haweswater Dam in his 1955 book A Pictorial Guide to the Lakeland Fells:

If we can accept as absolutely necessary the conversion of Haweswater [to a reservoir], then it must be conceded that Manchester have done the job as unobtrusively as possible. Mardale is still a noble valley. But man works with such clumsy hands! Gone for ever are the quiet wooded bays and shingly shores that nature had fashioned so sweetly in the Haweswater of old; how aggressively ugly is the tidemark of the new Haweswater!

Haweswater is a 2002 novel by British writer Sarah Hall, set in Mardale at the time of the building of the dam and flooding of the valley. It won the 2003 Commonwealth Writers' Prize for a First book. The novel was released in the United States as a paperback original in October 2006, by Harper Perennial.

The RSPB's site manager at Haweswater, Lee Schofield, published Wild Fell: Fighting for Nature on a Lake District Hill Farm (2022), a personal account of the charity's work at the site.
