= Tebay railway station =

Former railway station in Westmorland, England

Tebay
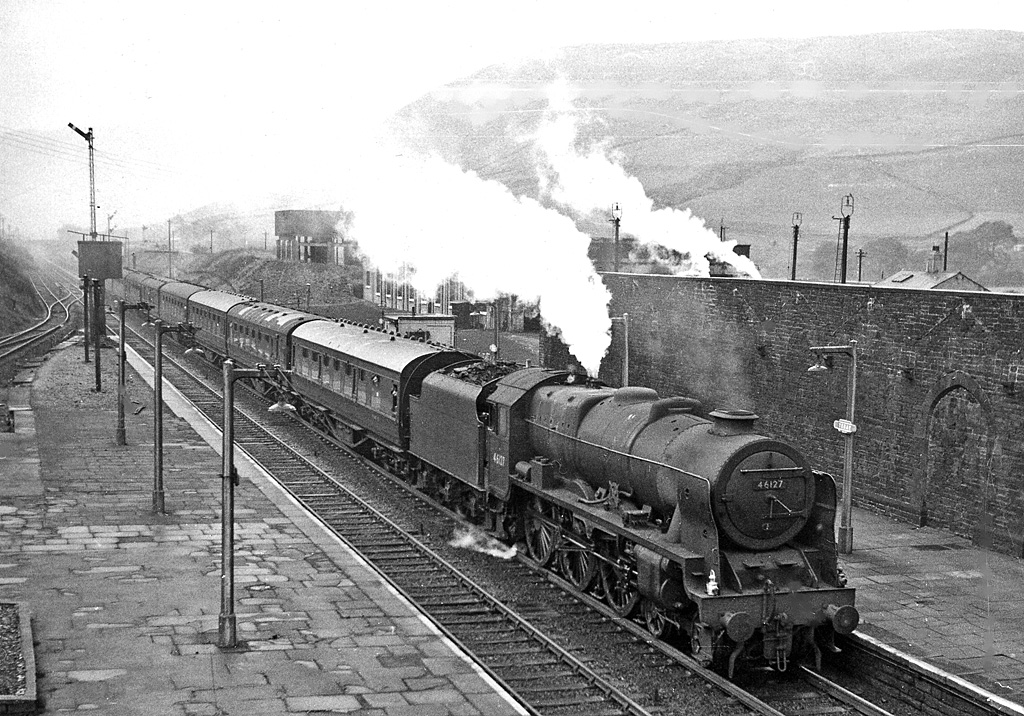
- Down WCML express passing Tebay Station in 1961

General information
- Location: Tebay, Westmorland and Furness; England
- Coordinates: 54.4270°N 2.5982°W
- Platforms: 3

Other information
- Status: Disused

History
- Original company: Lancaster and Carlisle Railway
- Pre-grouping: London and North Western Railway
- Post-grouping: London, Midland and Scottish Railway

Key dates
- 17 Dec 1846: Opened
- 1 July 1968: Closed
Location

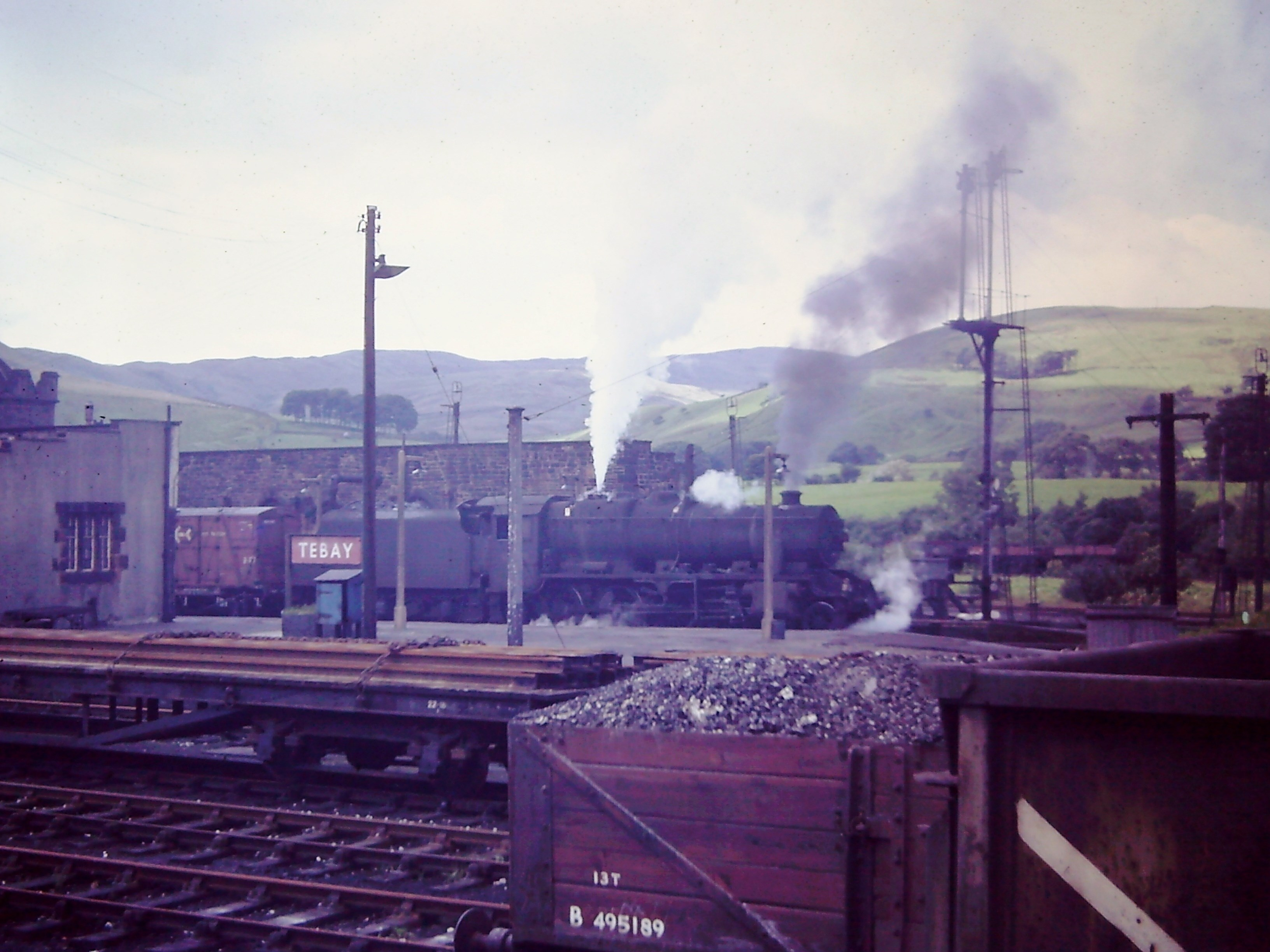
A scene at Tebay with an unidentified 8F.

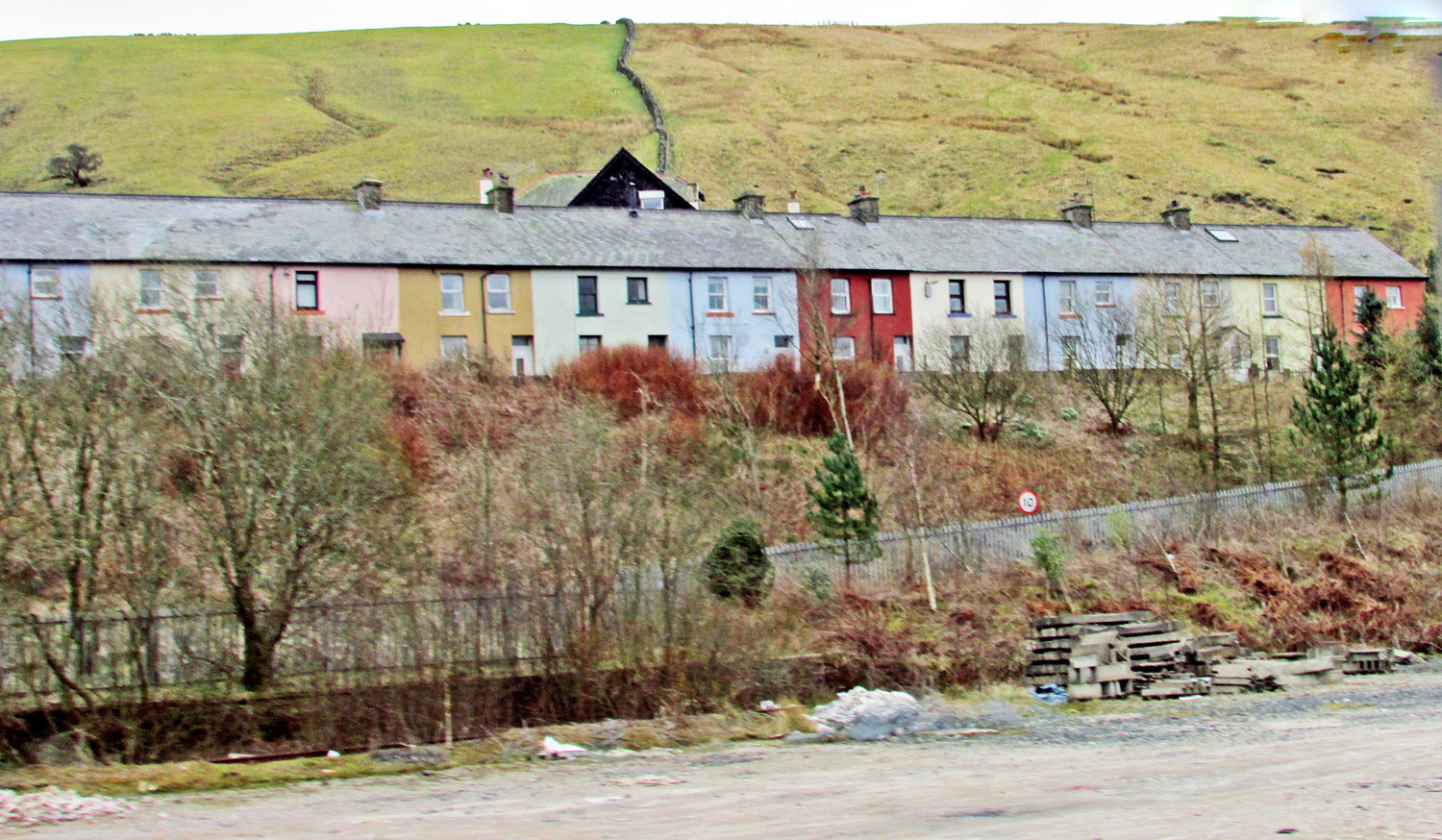
Terraced cottages at Tebay built for railway workers and their families, as seen from the West Coast Main Line in 2016

Tebay railway station was situated on the Lancaster and Carlisle Railway (L&CR) (part of the West Coast Main Line) between Lancaster and Penrith. It served the village of Tebay, Cumbria, England. The station opened in 1846, and closed on 1 July 1968.

== History ==
Prior to arrival of the railways, the location had a population of six people. The station was built by the L&CR in 1846, which was absorbed by the London and North Western Railway (LNWR) in 1879. The station was rebuilt in 1861 jointly as the western terminus of the South Durham & Lancashire Union Railway (SD&LR) - itself absorbed by the North Eastern Railway (NER) - to make its eastward journey to connect with the Stockton & Darlington Railway near Bishop Auckland, and hence onwards to Durham. From 1861 the Ingleton Branch Line of the Lancaster and Carlisle Railway connecting via the Midland Railway to Settle and Leeds, entered the main line at the south end of the Lune Gorge.

The railway companies provided much employment for local people and this brought about the construction of housing to accommodate the increased population. Still central to the village today is the Railway Club, whilst two railway built pubs still also exist. The local Junction Hotel is now flats but once had dance halls.

A steam locomotive shed was located on the west side of the line just south of the station and provided banking locomotive assistance for heavy trains on the steep 1 in 75 gradient to the nearby Shap summit. The shed was closed in 1968, shortly before steam locomotives were entirely withdrawn from British Railways main line scheduled services.

== Accidents ==
On 15 February 2004, four men carrying out maintenance work on the line were struck and killed by a runaway wagon in the Tebay rail accident. Three years later, the Grayrigg rail crash happened on 23 February 2007 between Oxenholme and Tebay.

== Cessation as a junction ==
Britain's railways were nationalised on 1 January 1948. In the early 1950s British Railways divided control of the former SD&LR between the North Eastern and London Midland regions, with Kirkby Stephen as the boundary. Local passenger trains were withdrawn between Kirkby Stephen and Tebay on 1 December 1952, although steam-hauled summer Saturday services from the north-east to Blackpool continued to use the route until the end of the 1961 holiday season. Freight was diverted via Newcastle and Carlisle from July 1960, and the last train ran on 20 January 1962. The passenger service was withdrawn on the remaining section of the former SD&LUR between Bishop Auckland and Barnard Castle on 12 June 1962. Following publication of Dr Beeching report, the line closed completely on 5 April 1965. Today the A685 runs over much of the former SD&LR trackbed east towards Kirkby Stephen.

The Ingleton Branch Line had always suffered from low traffic, whilst its major industrial customers all ceased operation in the 1930s. After rail nationalisation in 1948, it was uneconomical to operate both the Ingleton Line and the parallel Settle–Carlisle Line, and so on 30 January 1954 the Ingleton line closed to passenger traffic. Goods traffic continued until 1 October 1964, and the route maintained as a possible relief route until April 1967, when the tracks were lifted.

== Closure ==
The end of junction traffic at the station resulted in the adjoining Victorian railway-boom village reducing in size by 150 people. The closure of the former steam shed brought further reductions in population and hence passengers. After closure of the station in 1968 the station buildings and platforms were demolished in the early 1970s, prior to the electrification of the route.

No trace of the station now remains, although the down goods loop and several sidings are still in place for use by engineering trains for Shap.

Preceding station	Disused railways	Following station
Terminus	South Durham & Lancashire Union Railway	Gaisgill
	Historical railways	
Low Gill	London and North Western Railway; Lancaster and Carlisle Railway	Shap
Low Gill	London and North Western Railway; Ingleton Branch Line	Terminus
