= Orton, Westmorland and Furness =

Village and civil parish in Cumbria, England

Coordinates: 54.468420°N 2.583724°W

Orton
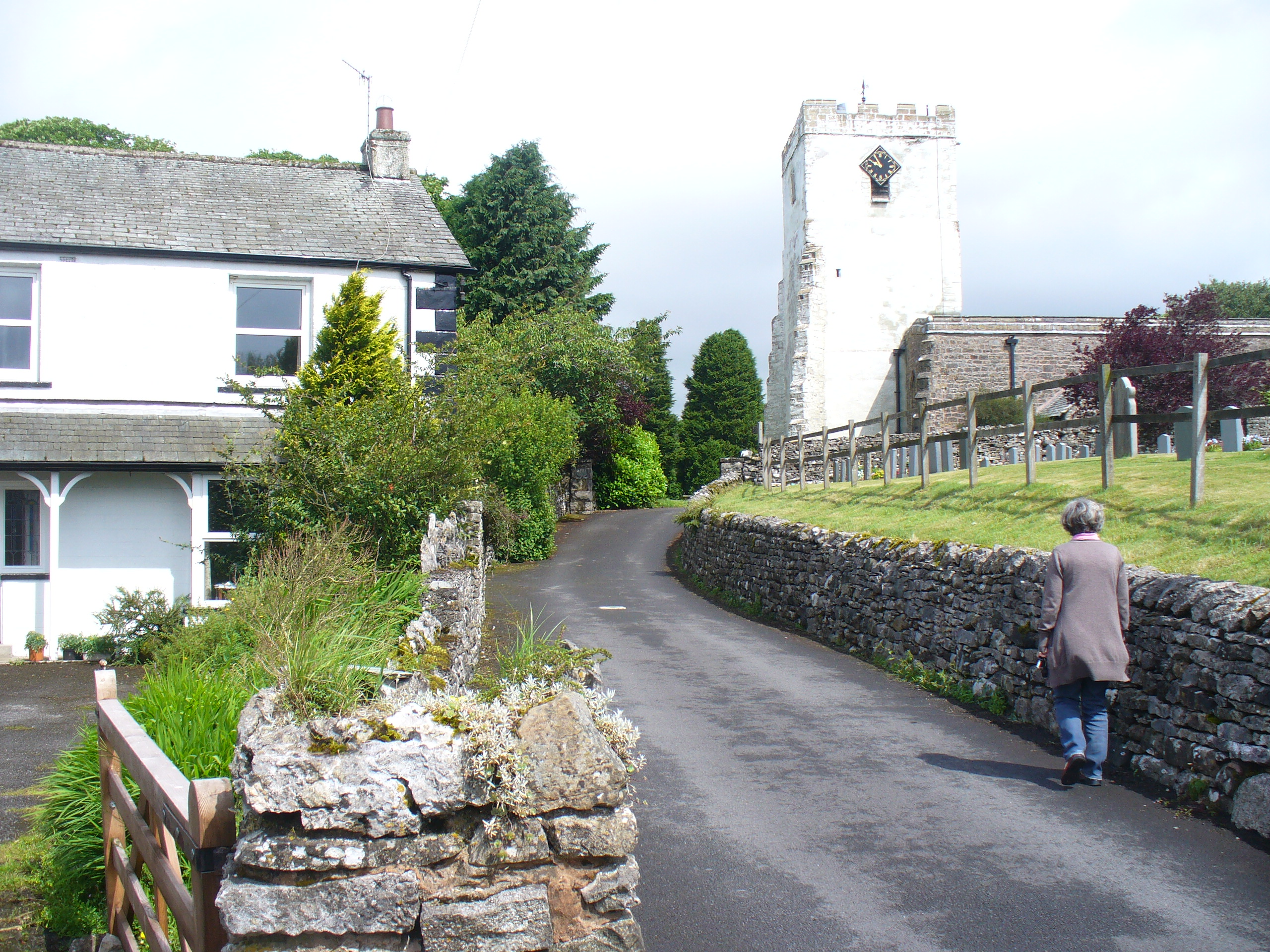
- All Saints Church

- Location in Eden, Cumbria Location within Cumbria
- Population: 588 (2011)
- OS grid reference: NY623083
- Civil parish: Orton
- Unitary authority: Westmorland and Furness
- Ceremonial county: Cumbria
- Region: North West
- Country: England
- Sovereign state: United Kingdom
- Post town: PENRITH
- Postcode district: CA10
- Dialling code: 015396
- Police: Cumbria
- Fire: Cumbria
- Ambulance: North West
- UK Parliament: Westmorland and Lonsdale

Orton is a village and civil parish in the Westmorland and Furness district, in the ceremonial county of Cumbria, England. It lies 15 miles (24 km) south of Penrith, 8 miles (13 km) from Appleby-in-Westmorland and 1.5 miles (2.4 km) from the M6 motorway. The village is in the upper Lune Valley, at the foot of Orton Scar in the Orton Fells. The Lake District is nearby. The parish includes a wide area outside the village, and had a population of 594 in 2001, decreasing to 588 at the 2011 Census. Until 1974 it was in Westmorland, from 1974 to 2023 it was in Eden district.

== Orton village ==
Orton has many 17th and 18th-century cottages. Most of these traditional dwellings are stone-faced or whitewashed. Other features in the village are the 13th-century All Saints Church, a Methodist chapel, a primary school, a pub called the George Hotel, and a small handmade-chocolate factory. In addition it has a Village Tearoom and several B&Bs. The shop-cum-post office is open ten hours a day. There are many local businesses around the village, such as builders and joiners. About 25 new houses were built in the early 1990s and Eden District Council was intending to build 50 more.

Orton village has a farmers market held on the second Saturday of each month in the village hall and market square, coupled with a live band and a hog roast. Orton was given a market town charter in the Middle Ages, but despite this remains a village, like other, similar villages in Westmorland so appointed such as Brough and Shap.

== Orton parish ==
With a 30-mile perimeter, Orton is a large parish, extending some 3 miles (5 km) west of the M6 motorway and 4 miles (6 km) east of the M6. It was historically in the county of Westmorland, and in 1974 became part of the Eden district in the new county of Cumbria. The parish includes the Tebay motorway service areas and a number of hamlets, including:

West of the M6

- Bretherdale
- Greenholme
- Scout Green
- Salterwath

East of the M6

- Kelleth
- Sunbiggin
- Raisbeck (site of a sausage factory)
- Bousfield
- Longdale

== Orton Fells ==
The Orton Fells are limestone hills extending north and east of the village of Orton. They include large areas of limestone pavement, formed into fissures by the abrasive action of glaciers.

=== Orton Scar ===
Orton Scar is an area of limestone pavement at the southern edge of the Orton Fells, a mile north of the village. From its summit you can see Blackpool Tower on a clear day, the A66 over Stainmore, the Lake District, the Howgill Fells and even down or up the Eden Valley to its source at Mallerstang.

The road to Appleby (B6260) leads over Orton Scar. The surrounding moorland was used in the film version of Anne Brontë's novel The Tenant of Wildfell Hall. There are two becks that flow through the village, which join into a river for about 20 metres then split again, both leading to Bybeck Bridge at the parish boundary next to Tebay.

Orton Scar Cafe serves meals in the daytime on Tuesdays to Saturdays.

== Governance ==
Orton is part of the electoral ward called Orton with Tebay. This covers both parishes and their surrounding areas. The total population of the ward at the 2011 Census was 1,364.

In 2016 part of the parish west of the M6 motorway became part of the Lake District National Park, and most of the parish east of the M6, including the village of Orton, became part of the Yorkshire Dales National Park.

== Notable people ==
- Thomas Barlow (1609–1691), academic and Anglican bishop
- George Whitehead (1636–1724), a founder of the Quaker movement

== See also ==
- Listed buildings in Orton, Westmorland and Furness
- Cumbria Directory entry on Orton
- Orton Farmers' Market
- Kennedys Chocolate Factory
