= Listed buildings in Orton, Westmorland and Furness =

Orton is a civil parish in Westmorland and Furness, Cumbria, England. It contains 15 listed buildings that are recorded in the National Heritage List for England. Of these, two are listed at Grade II*, the middle of the three grades, and the others are at Grade II, the lowest grade. The parish contains the village of Orton, and smaller settlements including Kelleth, Raisbeck, and Greenholme, but is almost completely rural. Most of the listed buildings are houses and associated structures, farmhouses and farm buildings. The other listed buildings are a church, a packhorse bridge, a marker stone, and two former schools.

== Key ==
Grade	Criteria
II*	Particularly important buildings of more than special interest
II	Buildings of national importance and special interest

== Buildings ==
Name and location	Photograph	Date	Notes	Grade
All Saints Church; 54.46951°N 2.58450°W		12th century	The tower dates from the early 16th century, the porch was added in 1607, and in 1878–79 Paley and Austin rebuilt the chancel and the north aisle. The church is in stone, the tower and nave are on a chamfered plinth and have stepped buttresses. The nave and south aisle have a lead roof, and the roof of the chancel and north aisle are slated. The church consists of a nave, aisles, a south porch, a higher chancel, and a west tower. The tower has three stages and an embattled parapet.	II*
Petty Hall; 54.46703°N 2.58430°W		1604	A large stone house with quoins, and a slate roof with stone coping at the south. There are two storeys, six bays, and a rear wing. On the front are two doorways, the right doorway with an architrave and an initialled and dated lintel. The windows are casements in chamfered mullioned surrounds and with hood moulds.	II*
Eskew Beck Farmhouse and barn 54.44574°N 2.63380°W	—	17th century	The farmhouse and barn are in stone with quoins and a slate roof. There are two storeys and overall there are six bays. The original house has four bays, and one bay of the barn has been incorporated into the house. There are two doors with segmental-arched heads, most of the windows are casements, there is one sash window, and one mullioned window. In the barn is a wagon entrance approached by a ramp.	II
Low Whinhowe Farmhouse and store 54.44261°N 2.62813°W	—	17th century (probable)	The building is in slate rubble on a plinth, with quoins and a slate roof. The house is stuccoed, it has two storeys and four bays, a 19th-century two-bay extension to the right, and an outshut at the rear. The windows in the original part are sashes, and in the extension they are casements. To the left of the house is a store.	II
Steps Farmhouse, barn and byres 54.45361°N 2.62273°W	—	Late 17th century	The farmhouse and outbuildings are in stone on a plinth, with quoins and a slate roof. The house is stuccoed, it has two storeys and four bays with a single-bay extension to the left, and a rear stair outshut. The windows are sashes, and there is a blocked mullioned window and a blocked fire window. The house is flanked by byres or barns on each side, and at the far right is an extension at right angles.	II
Kelleth Farmhouse; 54.44134°N 2.52399°W	—	Late 17th to early 18th century (probable)	The farmhouse is in stone on a plinth, with quoins, a dentilled eaves cornice, and a slate roof with stone copings. It has two storeys, a double-depth plan, a central block of three bays, and single-bay projecting gabled wings. In the central block is a doorway with a segmental pediment, and the windows are mullioned. In the right wing is a doorway with a cornice, and on the inner face of each wing is a decorated panel.	II
Marker stone 54.45537°N 2.69011°W	—	Early 18th century	This was either a boundary stone or a milestone provided for the Shap to Kendal turnpike road. The stone has a square plan and a domical top, it is about 1.5 feet (0.46 m) high and about 1 foot (0.30 m) wide, and is inscribed with the number "10".	II
Barn and byre range, Petty Hall; 54.46717°N 2.58440°W	—	1740	The range is in stone with quoins and it has a slate roof with stone coping to the north gable. There are two storeys and six bays. On the front is a segmental-arched wagon entrance, a window and doors, one of which has an initialled and dated lintel, and in the upper floor is a loft door and ventilation slits. At the rear is a barn entrance, and in the north gable end are dove holes.	II
Packhorse bridge 54.45290°N 2.56080°W	—	18th century (or earlier)	The packhorse bridge crosses Rais Beck. It consists of stones laid end on, and has low stepped parapets. The bridge has a segmental arch with a span of about 10 feet (3.0 m), and it is about 4 feet (1.2 m) wide. The bridge is also a scheduled monument.	II
Orton Hall; 54.46427°N 2.57970°W	—	Late 18th century	A large house either built for, or an earlier house refronted for Richard Burn. It is in stone with rusticated quoins and hipped slate roofs. The front is symmetrical, and the main block has two storeys and five bays, with an eaves cornice and a central lead-roofed cupola. In the middle of the block, steps lead up to a doorway with a Tuscan doorcase and a pediment, and above it is a Venetian window. Flanking the doorway are two-storey canted bay windows, and the other windows are sashes. Outside the main block are recessed single-bay wings with Venetian windows, and flanking these are curved walls leading to pavilions with ogee-headed windows.	II
Dame School; 54.46099°N 2.54875°W	—	1780	The dame school has since been converted into a dwelling. It is in stone and has quoins and a slate roof. There are two storeys, a single bay, and a lean-to porch.	II
Fawcett Millhouse and byre 54.45204°N 2.56187°W		1784	The miller's house, and the byre added later, are in stone with quoins and a slate roof, and are in two storeys. The house has three bays, a gabled porch with side benches, a door with an initialled and dated lintel, and mullioned windows. The byre to the left has three bays with a main entrance on the side and a loft door at the rear.	II
Town Head House; 54.47008°N 2.58193°W	—	1793	A stone house on a plinth, with quoins and a slate roof with stone copings. It has two storeys and a symmetrical front of three bays. Steps lead up to a central doorway with a flat-roofed Tuscan porch. The windows are sashes in stone surrounds, and at the rear is a semicircular-headed stair window.	II
Wall, railings and gate, Town Head House; 54.46969°N 2.58212°W	—	c. 1793 (probable)	The garden wall is in stone with chamfered copings and carries railings about 2 feet (0.61 m) high. The railings have ornate wrought iron panels between which are cast iron balusters with urn finials. The square ashlar gate piers have pyramidal caps and ball finials.	II
Old School; 54.44535°N 2.62241°W	—	Mid-19th century (probable)	The former school is in stone on a boulder plinth, with quoins and a slate roof. It has a single storey, it originally has three bays, a further bay was added to the left, and at the right is a recessed porch. There is a small casement window in the porch, and the other windows are fixed. In the right gable is a small bell.	II
