= George Whitehead (Quaker leader) =

George Whitehead (1636–1723) was a leading early Quaker preacher, author and lobbyist remembered for his advocacy of religious freedom before three kings of England. His lobbying in defence of the right to practise the Quaker religion was influential on the Act of Uniformity, the Bill of Rights of 1689 and the Royal Declaration of Indulgence. His writings are both biographical and ideological in nature, examining the Quaker way of life.

== Early life ==
Whitehead was born at Sunbiggin, near Orton, Westmorland. He became convinced of Quaker principles by the time he reached the age of 14 and in 1652, he left home at the age of 16 believing that Christ had commanded him to preach. After a year of preaching in southern England, Whitehead became known as one of the Valiant Sixty who travelled as Quaker preachers during a time of religious persecution. Whitehead, James Parnell and Edward Burrough were the only teenaged males counted among the sixty (Elizabeth Fletcher and perhaps Elizabeth Leavens were 16 years old when they left Kendal to preach).

== Ministry ==
Whitehead was frequently jailed. The first of several incarcerations occurred in 1654. While he was visiting St Peter's Church in Norwich, Whitehead addressed a gathering upon the conclusion of the service and was subsequently jailed by the mayor for disseminating an unorthodox opinion about baptism. When Whitehead appeared in court, he was sent back to jail for failing to remove his hat in the presence of the judge.

He was arrested again on 30 May 1655 after associating with a man who posted a religious text on the church door in Bures, Suffolk. He wrote:

When he had examined us, he could not lay the least breach of any law to our charge, nor show anything contrary to the Scriptures... For in it we were termed laborers of Bures and accused of several times disturbing the magistrates and ministers, and with having been several days at Bures before we were taken prisoners. When in fact John Harwood was never in that town or county before that day we were taken prisoners.

In 1656 Whitehead was released from prison because of pleas to Oliver Cromwell who interceded on his behalf. Whitehead was publicly whipped in Nayland and in Saffron Waldon he was placed in the stocks.

== Advocate of religious freedom ==
By 1660 Whitehead had settled down, was staying out of jail, preaching less and working as a grocer in London to support his family. In 1661, he was persuaded to join a group of Friends appearing before the House of Commons to argue against the passing of the Act of Uniformity. The group was unsuccessful and the act became law the following year, resulting in the departure of nearly 2,000 clergymen from the Church of England.

Whitehead remained in London throughout the difficult times that followed. In 1665, he was praying at the bedsides of dying Quakers as the plague claimed the lives of close to 100,000 throughout England. When the following year brought the Great Fire of London, Whitehead again remained in London to pray with victims. He was imprisoned again in 1668 after a meeting with several Friends that would serve as inspiration for his next mission where Whitehead led a group of Friends in obtaining for individuals persecuted for their religion a pardon directly from King Charles II known as the Royal Declaration of Indulgence. It called for the release of 490 persons from English jails, among them John Bunyan who would go on to be one of Whitehead's greatest public critics. This was one of several major steps towards freedom of religious worship in England.

On 13 May 1670 he married Anne Downer who was much older than him. She was a notable advocate for Quakerism.

In May 1685, accompanied by Alexander Parker and Gilbert Latey, he appealed to King James II to honour the agreement made with King Charles II, the King blaming Presbyterians in Parliament for voiding the declaration. Again a declaration was issued that pardoned more prisoners of religious persecution. His wife died in 1686.

In 1689 Whitehead led a group of men before King William III to plead for a continuation of pardons and rights for the religiously persecuted. The meeting was successful and would influence the king in the creation of the Bill of Rights of 1689. Of this meeting Whitehead said:

This resulted under the reign of King William a first step in obtaining liberty by law to enjoy our religious meetings for the worship of God peaceably, without molestation or disturbance by informers or other persons, yet many of our friends remained prisoners, and under prosecution by priests and magistrates, for non-payment of tithes, and kept them detained in prison, chiefly on contempts, as their term is for not swearing upon oath to the priests' bills and complaints.

George Whitehead died in 1723 and was laid to rest in the Quaker Burying Ground, Bunhill Fields, next to another of the Quaker movement founders, George Fox.

== Publications ==
In 1716, George Whitehead edited a collected edition of James Nayler's writings entitled A Collection of Sundry Books, Epistles, and Papers Written by James Nayler, Some of Which Were Never Before Printed: with an Impartial Relation of the Most Remarkable Transactions Relating to His Life . However, Whitehead omitted Nayler's more controversial works and freely edited and changed the text. This occurred after the death of George Fox, who had opposed the re-issuing of any of Nayler's writings.
