= Scout Green =

Hamlet in Cumbria, England

Coordinates: 54.462°N 2.627°W

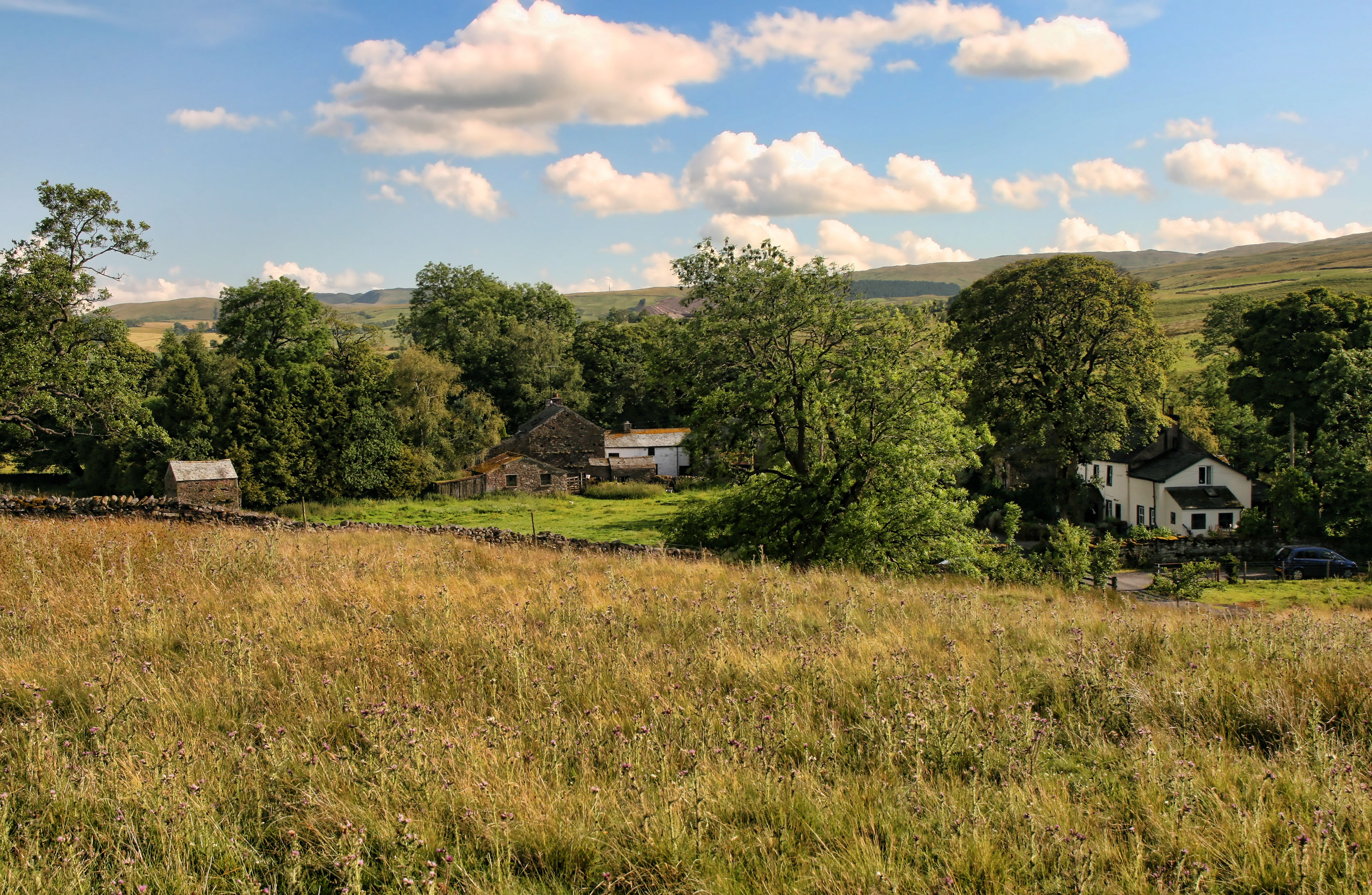
- Scout Green

- Location in former Eden District, Cumbria Location within Cumbria
- OS grid reference: NY593075
- Civil parish: Orton
- Unitary authority: Westmorland and Furness
- Ceremonial county: Cumbria
- Region: North West
- Country: England
- Sovereign state: United Kingdom
- Post town: PENRITH
- Postcode district: CA10
- Dialling code: 015396
- Police: Cumbria
- Fire: Cumbria
- Ambulance: North West
- UK Parliament: Westmorland and Lonsdale

Scout Green is a hamlet and small area of farm land near the village of Tebay in Cumbria, England.

== History ==
It is best known among railway enthusiasts as a location for trainspotting and photography on the West Coast Main Line between Penrith and Oxenholme, and has been a popular vantage point on the railway since soon after the opening of this section of the Lancaster and Carlisle Railway in December 1846. Northbound steam hauled trains were often banked up the 1 in 75 gradient towards Shap whilst southbound trains can be observed accelerating downhill from Shap Summit. A signal box was located at Scout Green, but this was removed in the early 1970s when the WCML was electrified.

An unusual feature of Scout Green is its access road — it involves travelling up a single track road which runs between the carriageways of the M6 motorway.
