= Listed buildings in Tebay =

Tebay is a civil parish in Westmorland and Furness, Cumbria, England. It contains nine listed buildings that are recorded in the National Heritage List for England. All the listed buildings are designated at Grade II, the lowest of the three grades, which is applied to "buildings of national importance and special interest". The parish contains the village of Tebay, but consists mainly of countryside and moorland. The River Lune passes through the parish, and two bridges crossing it are listed. The other listed buildings consist of farmhouses and farm buildings, a house, and a church with associated structures.

== Buildings ==
Name and location	Photograph	Date	Notes
Low Borrowdale Farmhouse and barn 54.41225°N 2.65011°W	—	1685	The barn was added to the left probably in the late 18th to early 19th century. The buildings are in slate rubble with slate roofs and together have an F-shaped plan. The house has two storeys and three bays, a central gabled porch containing stone side benches, a doorway with a segmental head, casement windows, and a firewindow. The barn is lower with an L-shaped plan, and has two segmental-headed doorways on the front and a cart entrance on the side.
Town Head Farmhouse and barn 54.44009°N 2.59107°W	—	1705	The farmhouse was extended and a barn added later in the 18th century. The buildings are in stone with quoins, slate roofs, and two storeys. The farmyard front of the house is pebbledashed, there are three bays, and on the front is a central projecting porch. The windows are of mixed types, and include a blocked mullioned window and a sash window, but most are casements. The single-bay barn has a segment-headed wagon door and an outshut, and a smaller door at the rear.
Roundthwaite Farmhouse and barn range 54.42434°N 2.60377°W	—	1730	The building is in stone with quoins and slate roofs, and is on a sloping site. The house has two storeys, three bays, and a full-width wing to the rear. On the front is a gabled porch and casement windows, the windows in the ground floor having segmental heads and a continuous hood mould. The barn to the left has three storeys and four bays, and a ramp leads to a first floor wagon door.
Garsgill Farmhouse and outbuilding 54.44183°N 2.56081°W	—	18th century (probable)	The farmhouse is probably a remodelling of a 17th-century house, and the outbuilding to the left was added later under the same roof. The whole building is in pebbledashed stone and has a slate roof. The house has three storeys and a symmetrical three-bay front. In the centre is a gabled porch, the windows are sashes, and above the ground floor openings are hood moulds. There are no features on the front of the outbuilding.
Salterwath Bridge; 54.40201°N 2.59972°W		1824	The bridge carries a road over the River Lune. It is in stone with segmental copings, and consists of two segmental arches, each with a span of about 4 feet (1.2 m), and with a cutwater. The roadway is about 20 feet (6.1 m) wide, and the parapets, which have splayed ends, are about 3 feet (0.91 m) high.
Lunes Bridge; 54.41968°N 2.59791°W		Early to mid 19th century	The bridge carried a road (now closed) over the River Lune. It is in limestone, and consists of a main elliptical arch and a smaller segmental flood arch to the east. The bridge has voussoirs and parapets of stone set vertically.
New House, wall and railings 54.44224°N 2.55912°W	—	1848	A stone house with quoins, a slate roof, two storeys, and a symmetrical three-bay front. In the centre is a porch with a flat roof carried on gadrooned columns, and the windows are sashes in stone surrounds. In front of the forecourt is a wall constructed from stone blocks with chamfered edges, and surmounted by cast iron railings.
St James' Church; 54.43390°N 2.59333°W		1878–80	The church was designed by C. J. Ferguson, it is built in Shap granite with slate roofs, and has internal walls of polychrome brick. It is on a chamfered plinth with stepped buttresses, and consists of a nave with a north porch and a west baptistry with a semicircular apse, a chancel, and a northwest circular bell turret. The turret has three stages, a corbelled-out bell stage, and a conical roof. Underneath the baptistry is a circular meeting room.
West gates, St James' churchyard 54.43410°N 2.59314°W	—	c. 1880 (probable)	The gates at the entry to the churchyard are in wrought iron with cast iron posts, and consist of double gates with kissing gates to the south. The posts are octagonal and have ball finials, and the standards of the gates have fleur-de-lis terminals.
