= Raisbeck =

Hamlet in Cumbria, England

Coordinates: 54.462°N 2.548°W

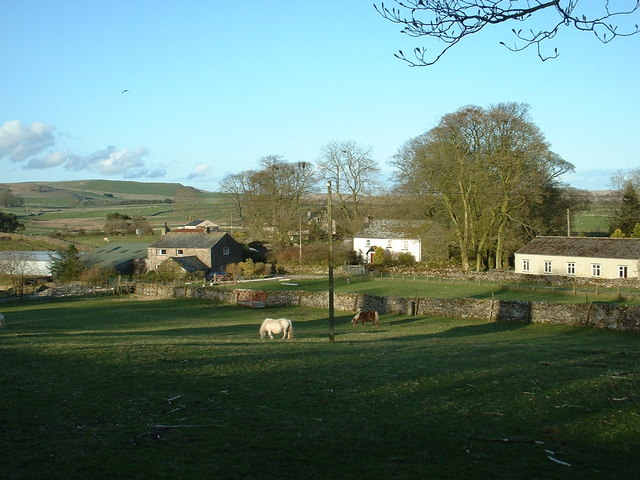
- Raisbeck village

- Location in former Eden District, Cumbria Location within Cumbria
- OS grid reference: NY644075
- Civil parish: Orton
- Unitary authority: Westmorland and Furness
- Ceremonial county: Cumbria
- Region: North West
- Country: England
- Sovereign state: United Kingdom
- Post town: PENRITH
- Postcode district: CA10
- Dialling code: 015396
- Police: Cumbria
- Fire: Cumbria
- Ambulance: North West
- UK Parliament: Westmorland and Lonsdale

Raisbeck is a hamlet in the civil parish of Orton, in the Westmorland and Furness district of Cumbria, England. The surname Raisbeck originates from the hamlet. The name of the hamlet derives from Hrridarr, a personal name and beck, a stream or river. There is also the smaller hamlet of Sunbiggin nearby. Circa 1870, it had a population of 214 as recorded in the Imperial Gazetteer of England and Wales.

Northwest of the hamlet is the Gamelands stone circle.

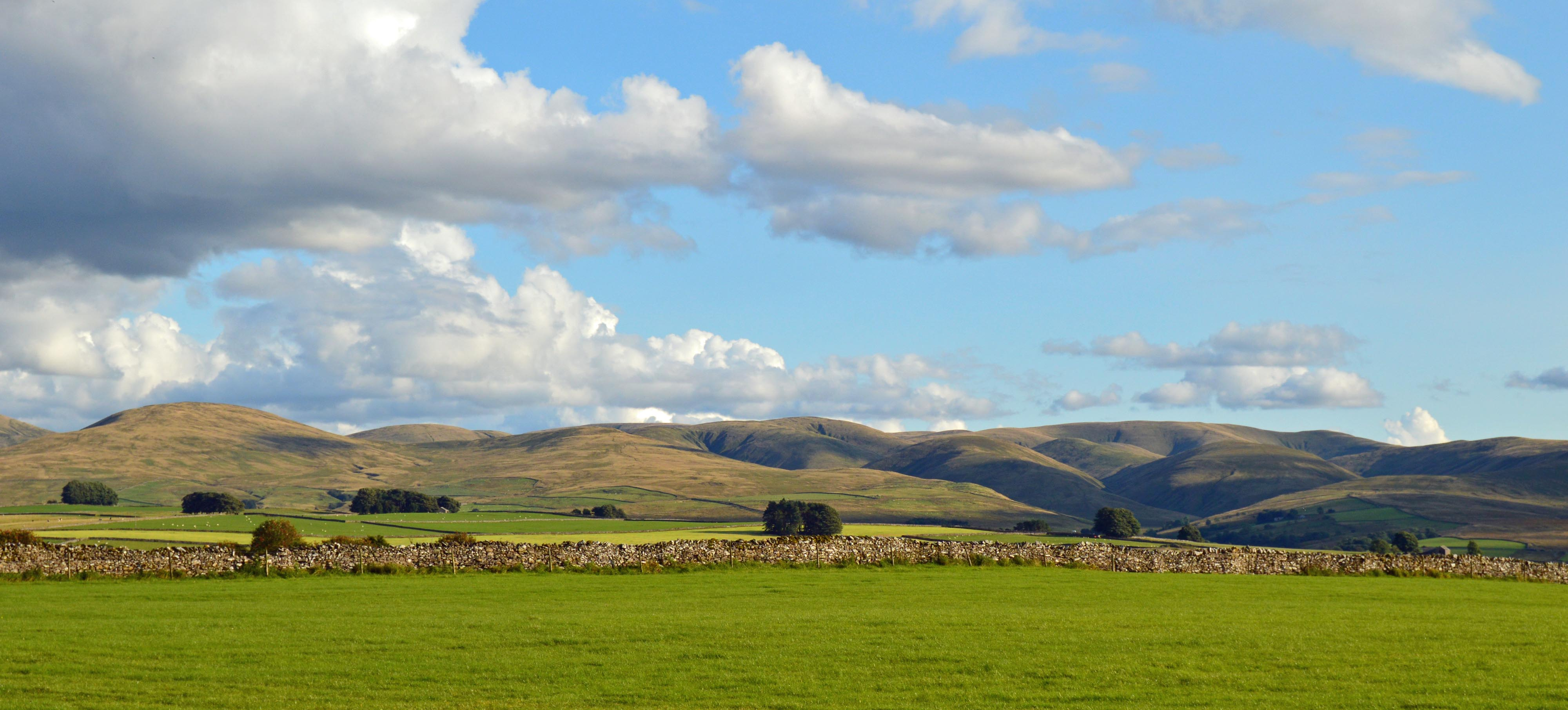
Panorama of Howgill Fells in evening from the hamlet of Raisbeck

== See also ==
- Listed buildings in Orton, Westmorland and Furness
