= Tebay rail accident =

Fatal accident in Cumbria, England

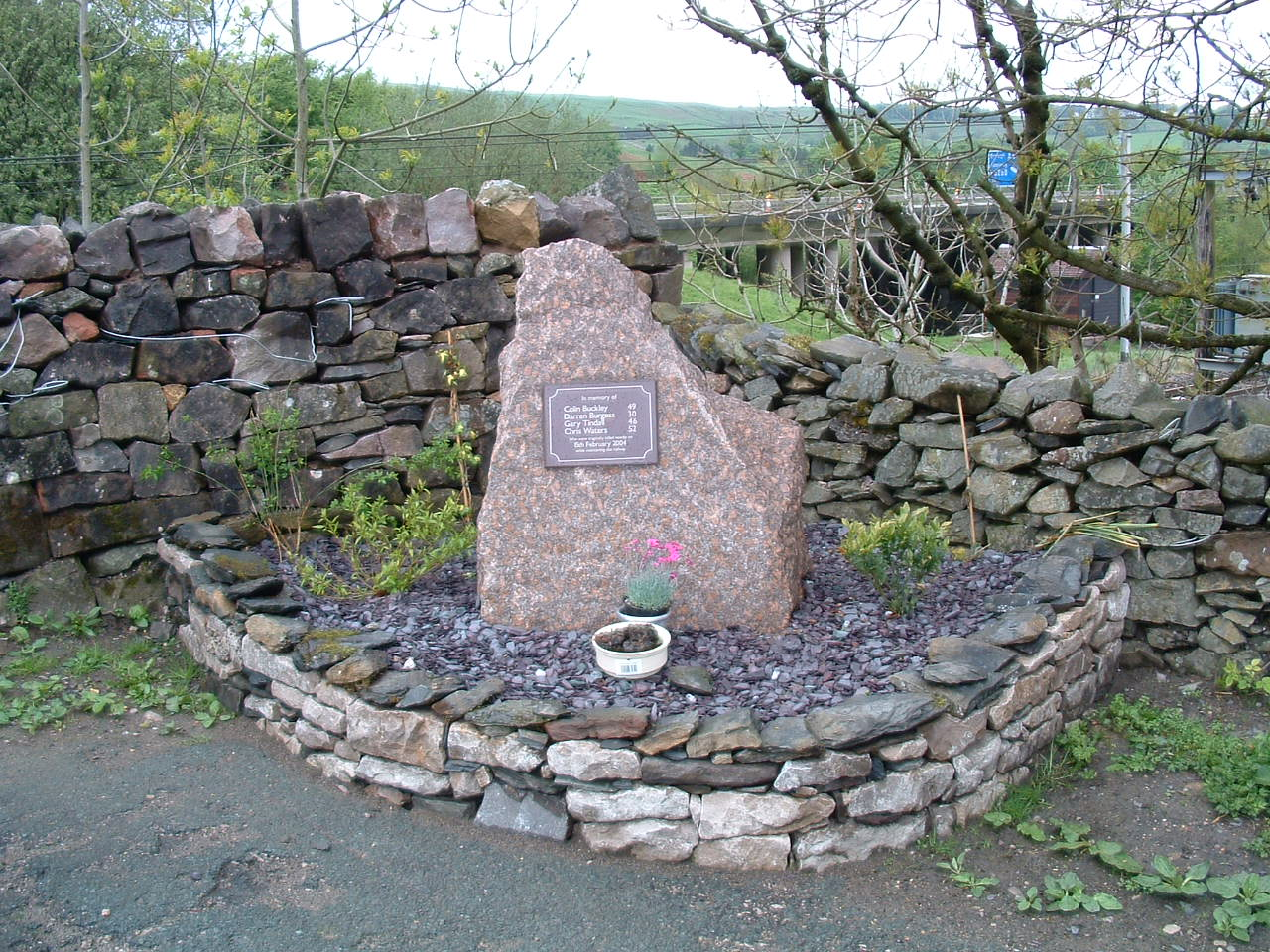
- Memorial to the Tebay rail accident

Details
- Date: 15 February 2004
- Location: Tebay, Cumbria
- Coordinates: 54°25′10.76″N 2°35′55.43″W
- Country: England
- Line: West Coast Main Line
- Incident type: Runaway train, Collision, Industrial Negligence
- Cause: Brake failure as result of gross negligence

Statistics
- Deaths: 4
- Injured: 5

The Tebay rail accident occurred when four railway workers working on the West Coast Main Line were killed by a runaway wagon near Tebay, Cumbria, England in the early hours of 15 February 2004.

== Incident ==
The accident happened after a wagon laden with lengths of steel rail ran away from a maintenance location on the line at Scout Green because it did not have properly working brakes. Wooden chocks had been placed in front of the wagon to stop it moving because the hydraulic brakes had been disconnected due to a fault; however, they had not been repaired or replaced. As a maintenance worker began using an excavator's "log grab" in an attempt to drag sections of scrap rail from the wagon, the action caused the wooden blocks to dislodge. Slowly the wagon began to move downhill gathering momentum on the 1 in 75 gradient from Shap Summit.

In darkness, the 16-tonne steel wagon rolled down the West Coast Main Line, reaching speeds of up to 40 miles per hour (60 km/h). Running almost silently and without any warnings, it struck and killed four railway workers who were carrying out overnight work 3.25 miles (5 km) further down the main line. Five men were also injured. The wagon continued to travel for almost 4 miles (6 km) until stopping.

== Memorial ==
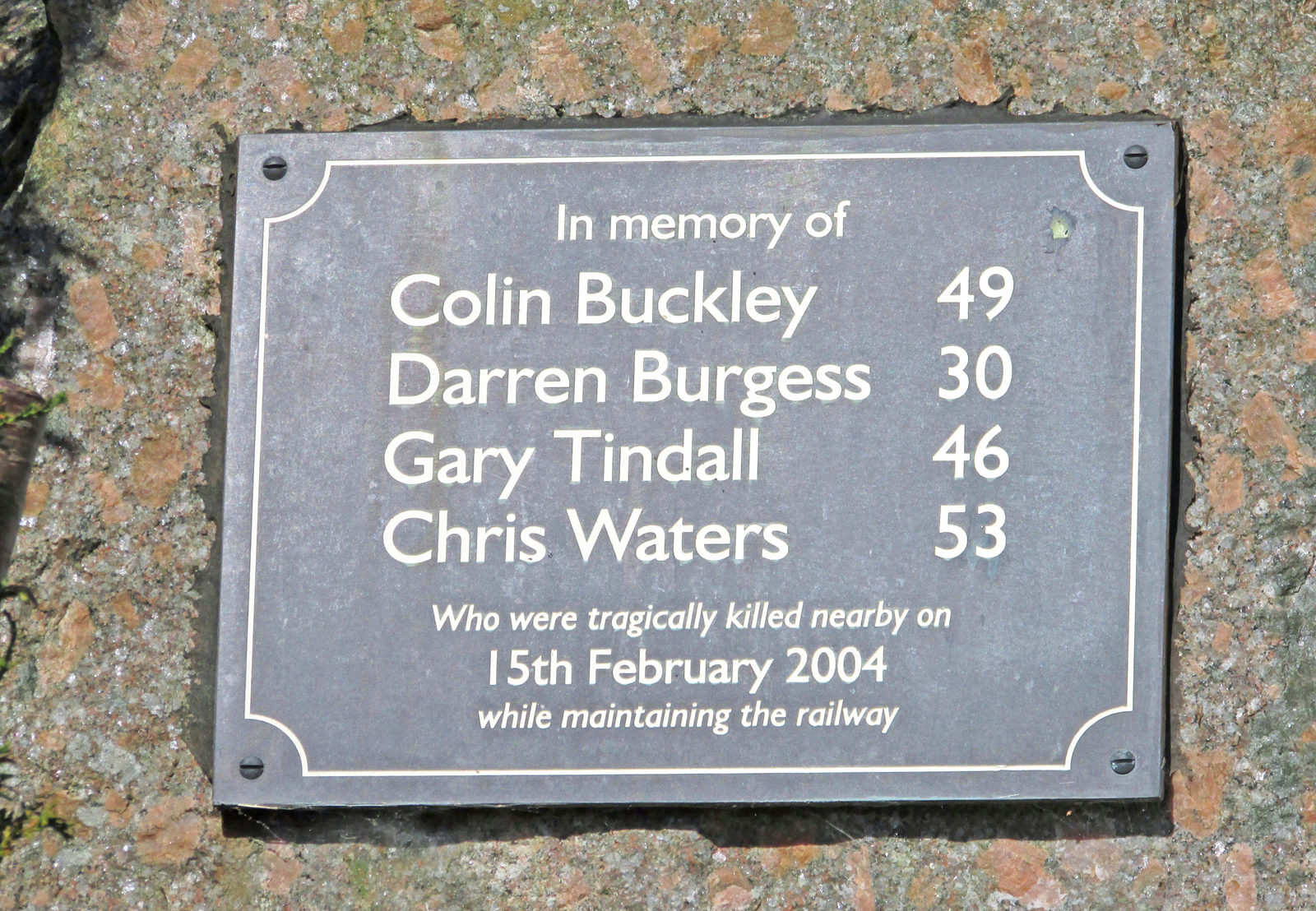
Close-up image of the plaque to the workers lost in the accident

A memorial plaque was erected in September 2006, on a large roughly hewn stone block adjacent to the scene of the incident. It is inscribed with the names of those who were killed.

== Aftermath ==
Following the incident, Mark Connolly, the boss of the rail maintenance company, MAC Machinery Services, and crane operator Roy Kennett, were tried at Newcastle Crown Court on charges of manslaughter caused by gross negligence. Connolly was also prosecuted for breaches of health and safety law. Both men were found guilty by majority verdicts; Connolly was sentenced to nine years’ imprisonment and Kennett to two years.

On 1 March 2007, an appeal launched by the two jailed men seeking to overturn their convictions failed. However, the Court of Appeal reduced Connolly's prison sentence from nine to seven years. In January 2017, the Office of the Traffic Commissioner for Wales announced it had rejected an application by Connolly for a Heavy Goods Vehicle Operators' Licence because of his manslaughter convictions. He had made the application to operate HGVs after being found driving a lorry without such a licence in May 2016.
