= All Saints Church, Orton =

Coordinates: 54.4695°N 2.5845°W

All Saints Church
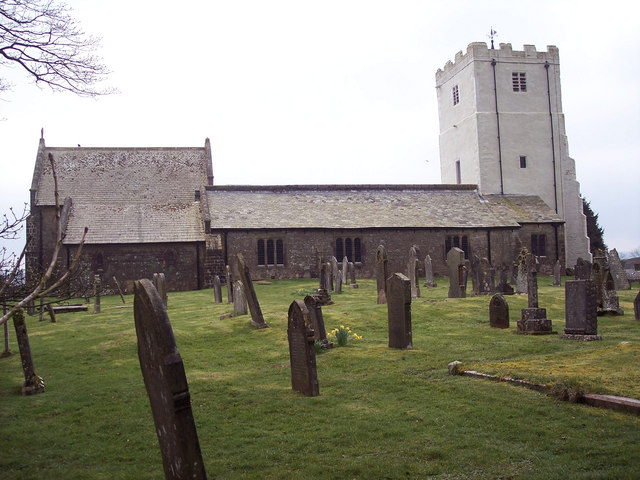
- All Saints Church from the north

- Location in Eden, Cumbria Location in Cumbria, England
- OS grid reference: NY 622,084
- Location: Orton, Cumbria
- Country: England
- Denomination: Anglican
- Website: All Saints, Orton

History
- Status: Parish church

Architecture
- Functional status: Active
- Heritage designation: Grade II*
- Designated: 6 February 1968
- Architect(s): Paley and Austin (partial rebuilding)
- Architectural type: Church
- Style: Gothic, Gothic Revival

Specifications
- Materials: Stone; Roofs of lead and slate

Administration
- Province: York
- Diocese: Carlisle
- Archdeaconry: Carlisle
- Deanery: Appleby
- Parish: Orton

Clergy
- Vicar: vacant from April 2021

All Saints Church is in the village of Orton, Cumbria, England. It is an active Anglican parish church in the deanery of Appleby, the archdeaconry of Carlisle, and the diocese of Carlisle. Its benefice is united with those of St Oswald, Revenstonedale, and St James, Tebay. The church is recorded in the National Heritage List for England as a designated Grade II* listed building.

== History ==
The earliest fabric in the church dates from the later part of the 12th century. The tower was built in the early 16th century, and the porch is dated 1607. In 1877–78, the chancel and north aisle were rebuilt by the Lancaster architects Paley and Austin. In 2006–07, the tower was rendered in lime, giving it a white appearance.

== Architecture ==
The church is constructed in stone, with roofs of either lead or slate. Its plan consists of a three-bay nave, north and south aisles, a south porch, an aisleless chancel, and a west tower. The south aisle is wider than the north. The tower is in three stages and has a castellated parapet. The windows along the aisles have three lights, and the chancel contains lancet windows.

Inside the church is an octagonal stone font dated 1662, inscribed with the initials "DW" and "MO". At the east end of the south aisle is a piscina in a trefoil-arched recess. Over the entrance to the church is a panel painted with Royal arms dated 1695. The pulpit is Victorian and consists of an octagonal bowl on a stone base. The stained glass in the east window is by Clayton and Bell, and in the south wall of the chancel the glass is by Abbot and Company, dated 1897. In the south aisle is a window designed by Beatrice Whistler (the wife of James McNeill Whistler), made by Campbell, Smith and Company in 1892; one designed by F. G. Christmas and made by the same company in about the same date; and another by Stanley Murray Scott for Reed Millican, dated 1959. There are memorials in the church dating from the 18th and 19th centuries.

The two-manual organ was made in about 1878 by Wilkinson and Son, and was overhauled in 1995 by Harrison and Harrison. There is a ring of eight bells. The oldest of these was cast by Abraham Rudhall I in 1711. The other seven were cast in 1917 by John Taylor & Co. There are three other bells that are unused. One of these was cast in about 1529 by John Woolley, and the other two in 1637, possibly by William Oldfield I.

== See also ==
- Grade II* listed buildings in Westmorland and Furness
- Listed buildings in Orton, Westmorland and Furness
- List of ecclesiastical works by Paley and Austin
