= Sunbiggin =

Hamlet in Cumbria, England

Coordinates: 54.471°N 2.526°W

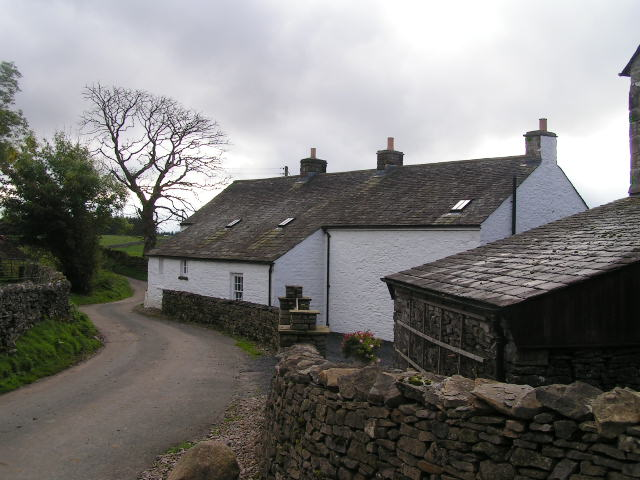
- Sunbiggin

- Location in Eden, Cumbria Location within Cumbria
- OS grid reference: NY659085
- Civil parish: Orton
- Unitary authority: Westmorland and Furness
- Ceremonial county: Cumbria
- Region: North West
- Country: England
- Sovereign state: United Kingdom
- Post town: PENRITH
- Postcode district: CA10
- Dialling code: 015396
- Police: Cumbria
- Fire: Cumbria
- Ambulance: North West
- UK Parliament: Westmorland and Lonsdale

Sunbiggin is a hamlet in the civil parish of Orton, in the Westmorland and Furness district, in the ceremonial county of Cumbria, England.

== Location ==
It is near the villages of Raisbeck and Orton.

== Transport ==
For transport there is the M6 motorway, A685 road, B6260 road and B6261 road nearby. It has a tarn called Sunbiggin Tarn.
