= Tebay =

Village and civil parish in Cumbria, England

Coordinates: 54.434°N 2.590°W

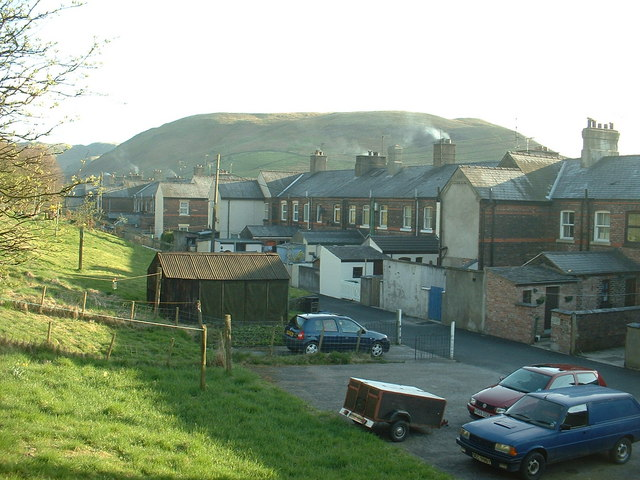
- Railway cottages

- Location in former Eden district, Cumbria Location within Cumbria
- Population: 776 (2011)
- OS grid reference: NY618045
- Civil parish: Tebay
- Unitary authority: Westmorland and Furness
- Ceremonial county: Cumbria
- Region: North West
- Country: England
- Sovereign state: United Kingdom
- Post town: PENRITH
- Postcode district: CA10
- Dialling code: 01539
- Police: Cumbria
- Fire: Cumbria
- Ambulance: North West
- UK Parliament: Westmorland and Lonsdale

Tebay is a village and civil parish in Cumbria, England, within the historic borders of Westmorland. It lies in the upper Lune Valley, at the head of the Lune Gorge. The parish had a population of 728 in the 2001 census, increasing to 776 at the Census 2011.

Old Tebay lies to the north of Tebay at grid reference NY618052. Historically a sheep farming area, the arrival of the railway led to increased prosperity.

== History ==
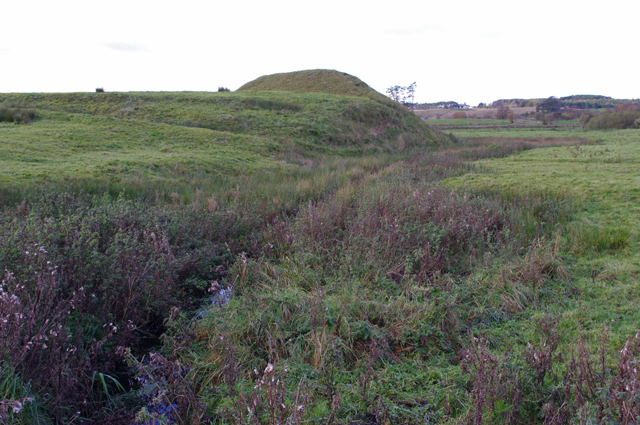
The motte and bailey at Castle Howe

To the north, occupying a strategic position by the River Lune, now close to the M6 motorway, are the earthwork remains of a motte and bailey castle known as Castle Howe.

During the Roman occupation a Roman road followed the course of the River Lune linking the Roman fort at Low Borrowbridge near Tebay with one at Over Burrow south of Kirkby Lonsdale. Another road, recently discovered using LIDAR, linked the fort at Low Borrowbridge with the fort to the north at Kirkby Thore, and thence to Whitley Castle and then Carvoran on Hadrian's Wall.

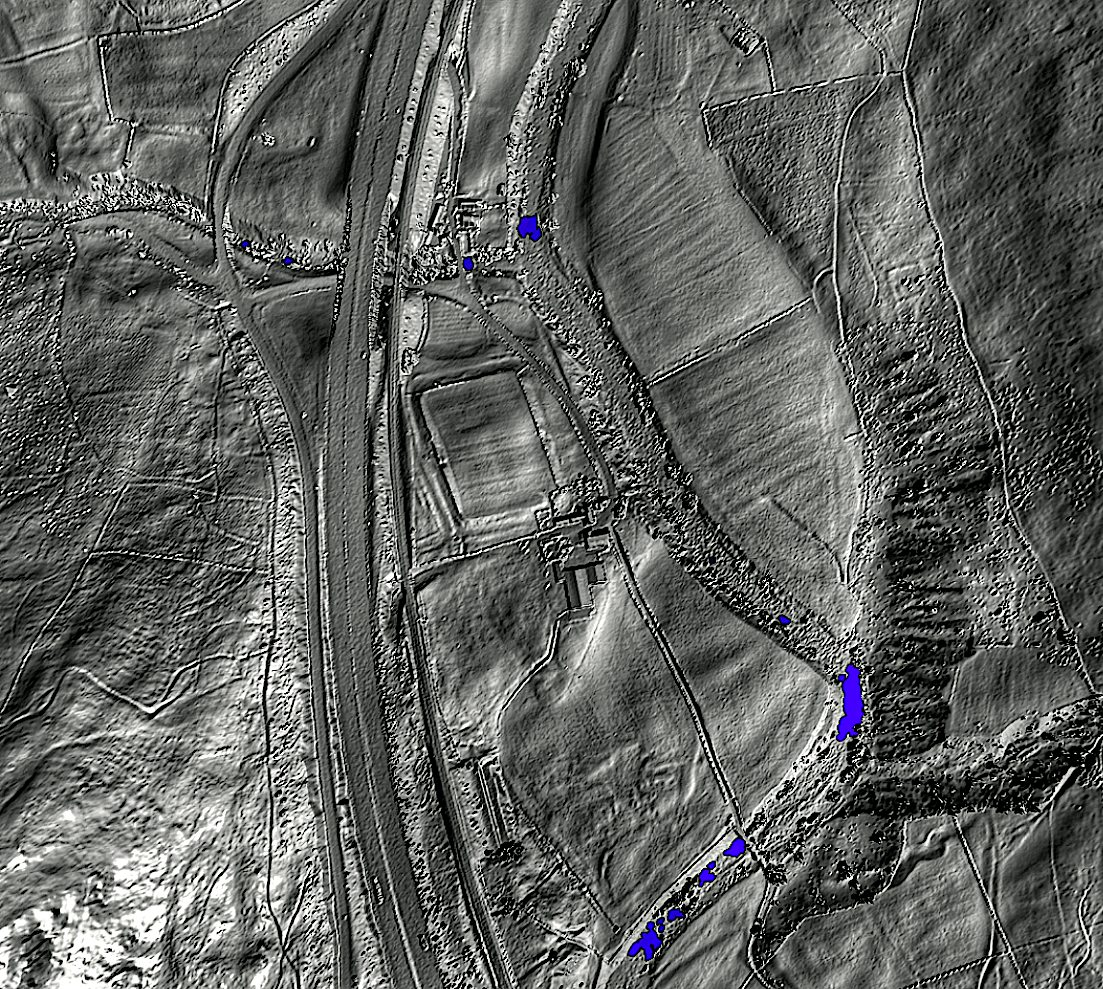
A very clear lidar view of Low Borrowbridge Roman Fort.

Tebay was the home of the prophetess Mary Baynes, known as the 'Witch of Tebay', who died in 1811.

Tebay was historically a township in the ancient parish of Orton. It became a separate civil parish in 1897.

=== Railways ===
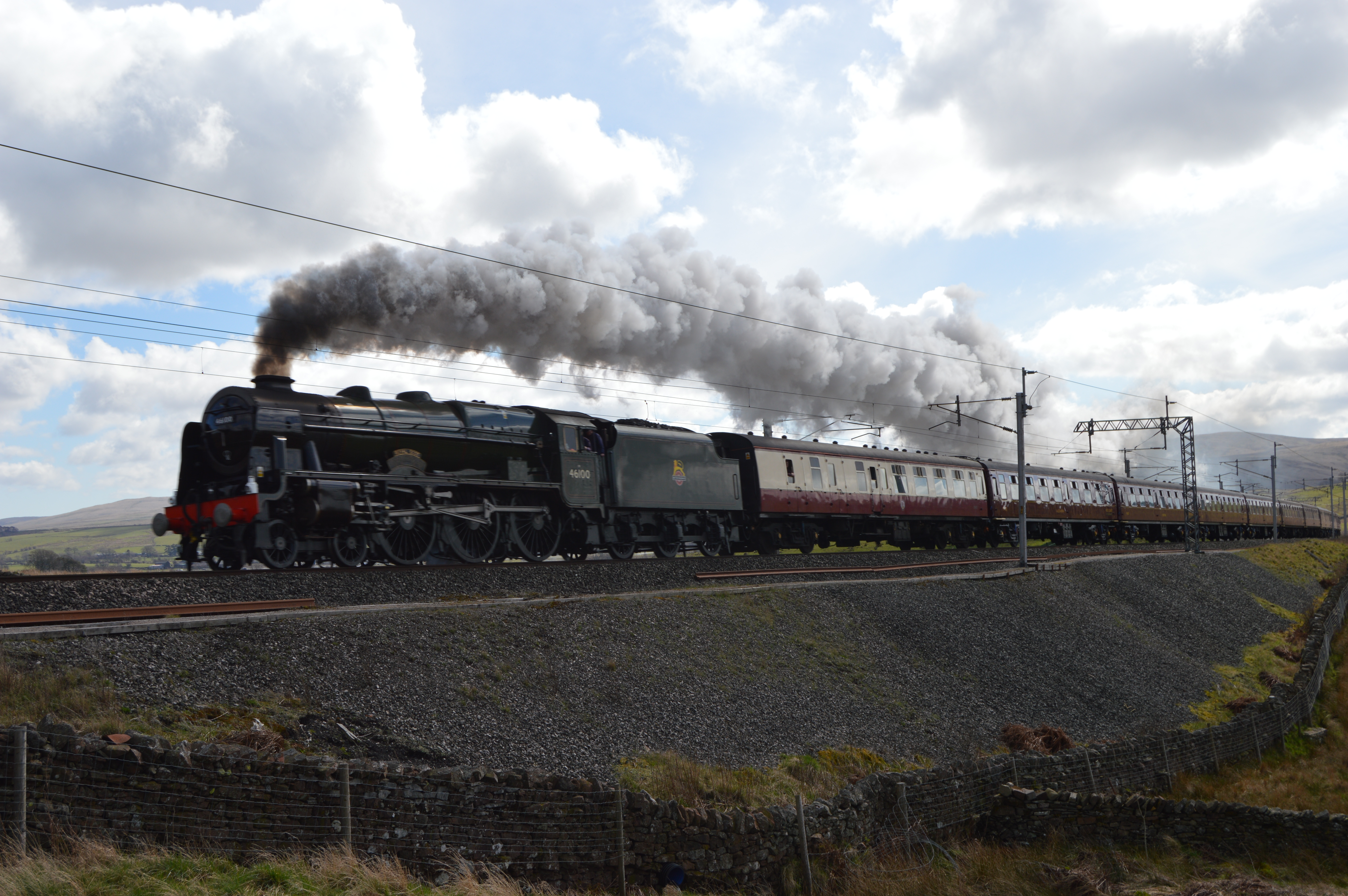
46100 Royal Scot attacking Shap Summit with a railtour nearby to Tebay Services in April 2016

Tebay railway station was on the Lancaster and Carlisle Railway, which was built to link those two cities between 1844 and 1846, and which was absorbed by the London and North Western Railway in 1879. Tebay became an important junction for, in 1861, the Stainmore Railway, from Tebay-Kirkby Stephen-Barnard Castle and later becoming part of the North Eastern Railway, brought traffic from the east; it was closed in 1962. The A685 runs over much of its trackbed east from Tebay towards Kirkby Stephen. The Ingleton Branch Line of the Lancaster and Carlisle Railway connecting via the Midland Railway to Settle and Leeds, enters the main line at the south end of the Lune Gorge; it was built in the 1850s, and was last used for passengers in the winter 1962–63 as a relief to the main line.

The railway companies provided much employment for local people and this brought about the construction of housing to accommodate the increased population.

There have been two railway accidents near the village: on 15 February 2004, four people were run over and killed by a maintenance vehicle in the Tebay rail accident; on 23 February 2007 the Grayrigg rail crash killed an elderly woman passenger between Oxenholme and Tebay on the West Coast Main Line.

== The village today ==
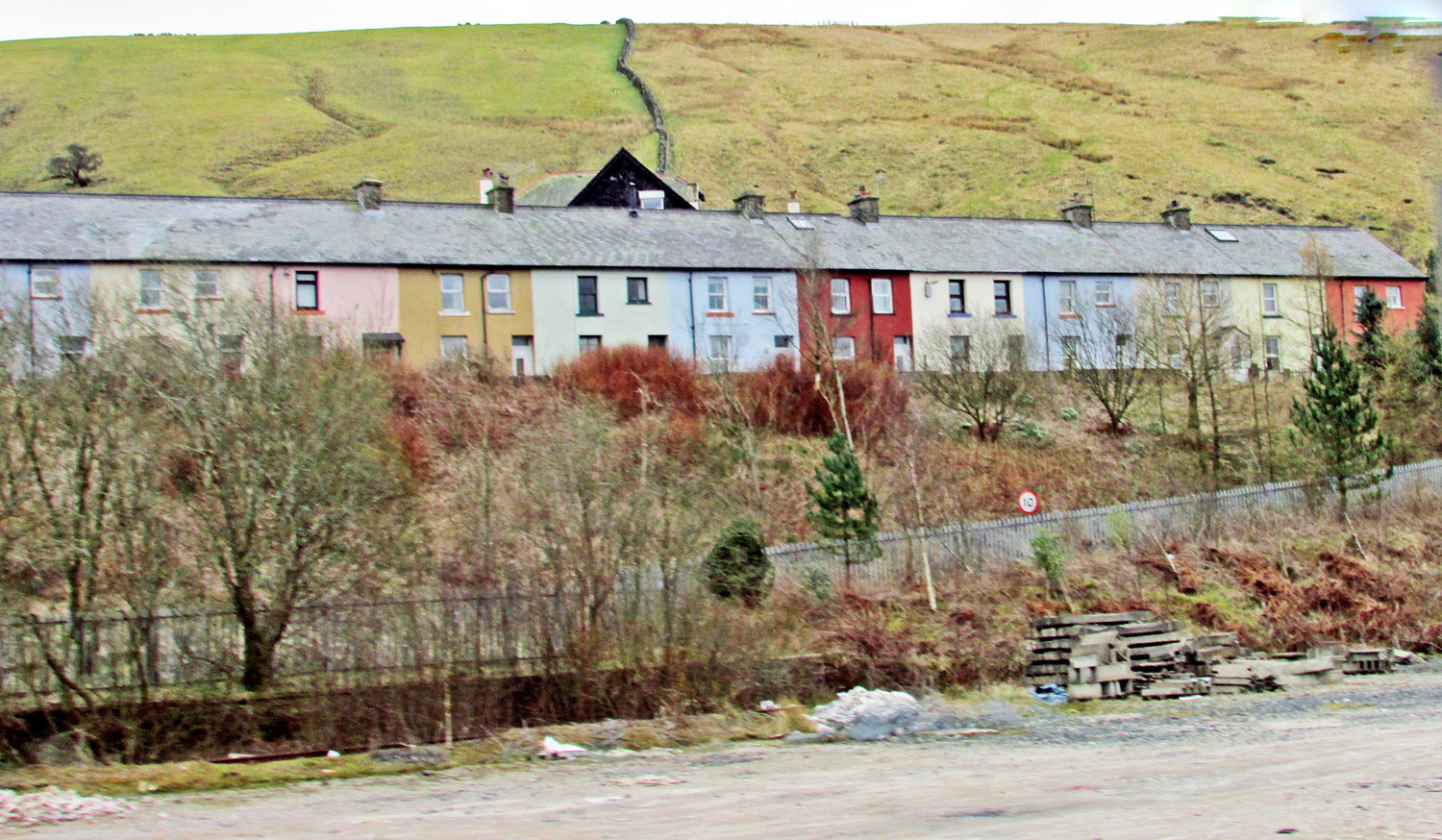
Terraced cottages at Tebay built for railway workers and their families, as seen from the West Coast Main Line in 2016

Tebay lies within the Westmorland Dales, which form part of the area covered by the Yorkshire Dales National Park. Central to the village is the Railway Club, which provides a concrete link to the past importance of the village. The Cross Keys pub in the village also provides a place where the inhabitants can come together. The local Junction Hotel is now flats but once had dance halls.

Junction 38 of the M6 lies just to the west of the village, south of the notoriously exposed Shap Summit. Like its predecessor, the main railway line, it uses the upper reaches of the River Lune to pass through the fells. Tebay Services, a mile north west of the village in the neighbouring parish of Orton, is one of the very few motorway service stations to be run independently, and has often won praise for its food.

== See also ==
- Listed buildings in Tebay
