= Shap Summit =

Hill in Cumbria, England

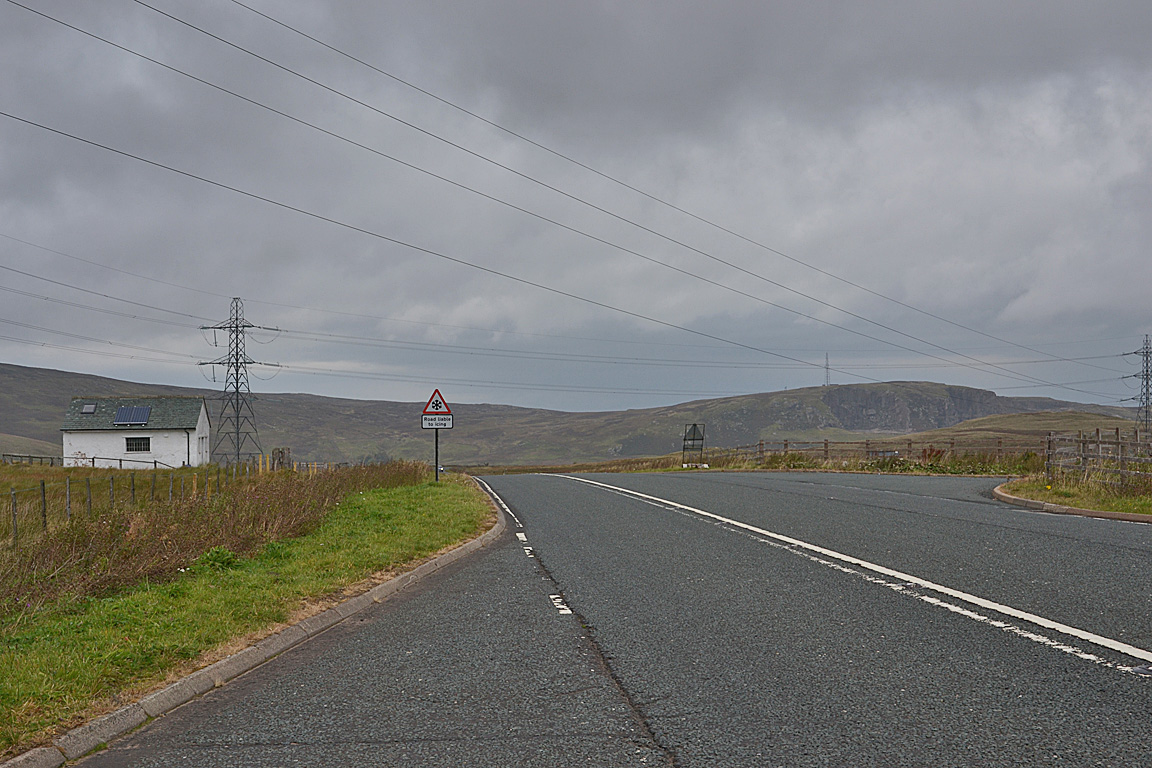
Shap Summit of the A6

Shap Summit refers to three different route summits in close proximity, of the A6 road, M6 motorway and the highest point of the West Coast Main Line railway in England, near to the Cumbria village of Shap in North West England, crossing the hills of the Lake District.

== Road ==
The route summit of the A6 road at Shap (54.4550°N 2.6910°W) is approximately 1,350 feet (410 m) above sea level. Until 1970, when the nearby M6 motorway was completed, it was one of the major routes between England and Scotland. The route was often hazardous in poor weather, and often became impassable in winter during snowfall.

The nearby summit of the M6 motorway (54.5017°N 2.6450°W) is 1,037 feet (316 m) above sea level, and was at the time of its opening in 1970, the highest stretch of the UK motorway network, it held this record for just 58 days however, as it was soon superseded by a stretch of the M62 motorway across the Pennines, which rose to a summit of 372 metres (1,220 ft).

== Rail ==
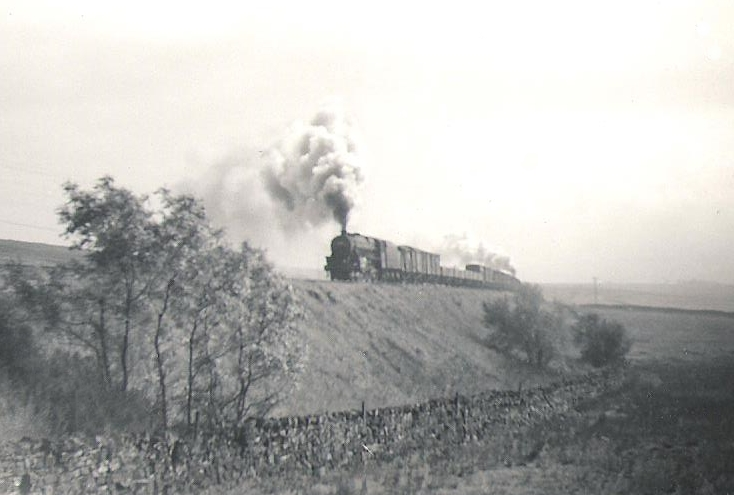
A heavy goods train climbing towards Shap Summit, assisted by a bank engine, 1967.

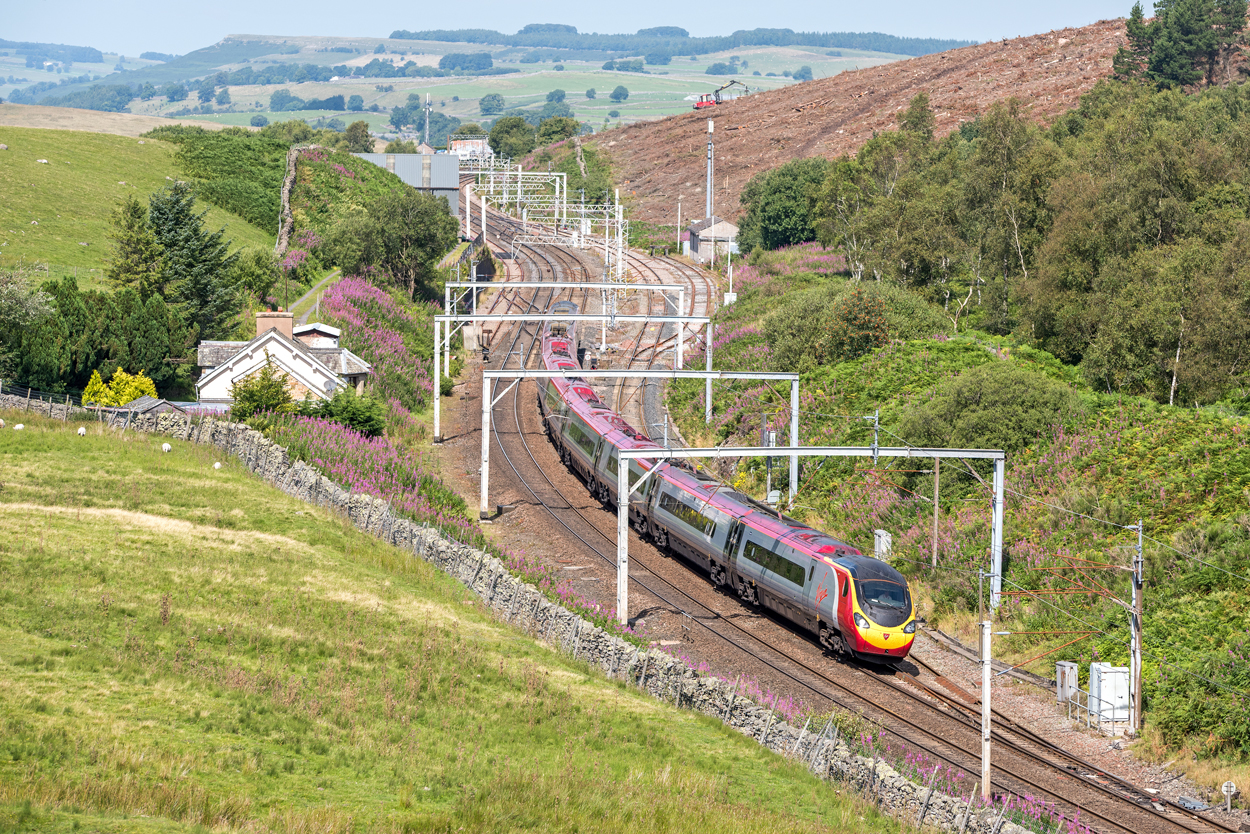
A southbound Class 390 passes Shap Summit, 2016

The summit of the West Coast Main Line (WCML) (54.4955°N 2.6665°W) is 916 feet (279 m) above sea level. It is the highest point of the WCML in England, although Beattock Summit in Scotland is the highest summit of the line, at 1,016 feet (310 m). The actual summit is in a cutting, a short distance south of the former Shap railway station. There are some sidings at the crest of the summit serving Shap granite quarry. The northbound climb has a 5.5-mile (8.9 km) ascent beginning at Tebay, with gradients of up to 1 in 75 (1 foot of rising or falling gradient for every 75 feet of distance). The southbound climb beginning at Penrith is longer, around 12 miles (19 km) but with gentler gradients of up to 1 in 125.

The line was opened in 1846 as part of the Lancaster and Carlisle Railway, engineered by Joseph Locke after much debate over the best routing of the line. In the days of steam locomotives, the steep gradients of the climb meant that bank engines based at Tebay were often required to assist trains up the incline. The line was electrified by British Rail in 1974. Modern diesel and electric traction has little difficulty in making the climb, although heavy freight trains occasionally require double heading. Rail tours which use steam locomotives often have to be assisted with a diesel or electric locomotive coupled in to the rear of the train to make the ascent.

In 2004 the Tebay rail accident occurred, when an unbraked wagon being used by track maintenance workers ran away downhill from Shap Summit, killing four railway workers at nearby Tebay. Another incident occurred in 2010 when a freight train climbing the northbound incline to the summit, came to a halt and then rolled backwards uncontrollably for 2.2 miles (3.5 km), reaching a speed of 51 miles per hour (82 km/h), until the driver was able to bring it to a stop before it caused any damage. The inquiry found that driver fatigue was the cause of the incident.

On 3 November 2025, a Class 390 Pendolino derailed south of the summit after hitting a landslide obstructing the track. Four minor injuries were reported.
