= Raisbeck (surname) =

Raisbeck is a surname. The surname may derive from Raisbeck in Cumbria, England, the name being well recorded in London in the 17th century suggests the village may have been evacuated. Notable people with this surname include:

- Alex Raisbeck (1878–1949), Scottish football player and manager
- Andrew Raisbeck (1881–1958), Scottish footballer
- Bill Raisbeck (1875–1946), Scottish footballer
- James D. Raisbeck (1936–2021), American aeronautical engineer
- Kenneth Raisbeck (1899–1931), American playwright and screenwriter
- Leslie Raisbeck (1907–1990), English footballer
- Ralph Raisbeck (1898–1958), Australian rules footballer
- Rosina Raisbeck (1916–2006), Australian opera and concert singer

== See also ==
- Raisbeck Aviation High School
