= Kelleth =

Hamlet in Cumbria, England

Coordinates: 54.441°N 2.524°W

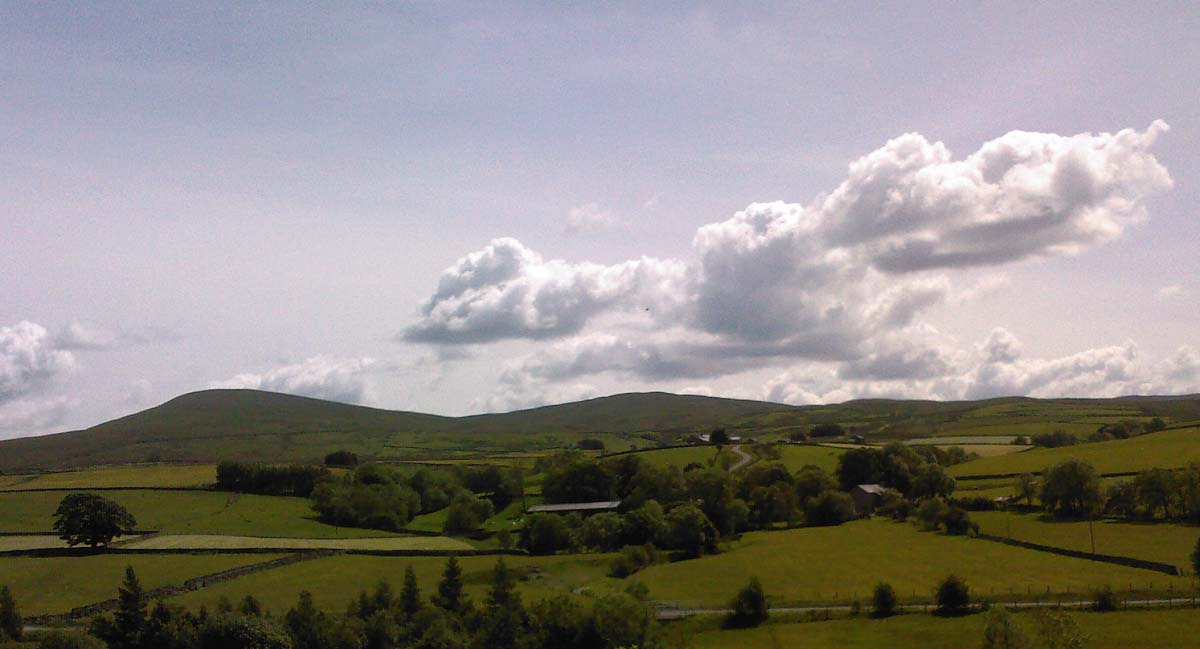
- View of Kelleth from the main road

- Location in former Eden District, Cumbria Location within Cumbria
- OS grid reference: NY660052
- Civil parish: Orton
- Unitary authority: Westmorland and Furness
- Ceremonial county: Cumbria
- Region: North West
- Country: England
- Sovereign state: United Kingdom
- Post town: PENRITH
- Postcode district: CA10
- Dialling code: 015396
- Police: Cumbria
- Fire: Cumbria
- Ambulance: North West
- UK Parliament: Westmorland and Lonsdale

Kelleth is a hamlet in Cumbria, England, containing around a dozen houses and formerly a toy factory. It is approximately 19 miles (31 km) from Penrith. It is in the Lune Valley, is situated next to the River Lune and is at an altitude of 750 ft (230 m). The oldest houses in the hamlet date as far back as the 17th century.

The hamlet has previously gone by the names "Kellath" and "Kellathe".

== Geography and Land Use ==
Kelleth is a rural hamlet and much of the land (more than 50%) is used for farming.

Situated on the outskirts of the hamlet are 3 disused limekilns.

== See also ==
- Listed buildings in Orton, Westmorland and Furness

== Further References and External Links ==
- Kelleth information on UK Villages site
- Kelleth information on "Geograph British Isles" site
- Kelleth on "Old Cumbrian Gazetteer"
