= Sunbiggin Tarn =

Glacial lake in Cumbria

Sunbiggin Tarn & Moors and Little Asby Scar
- Site of Special Scientific Interest
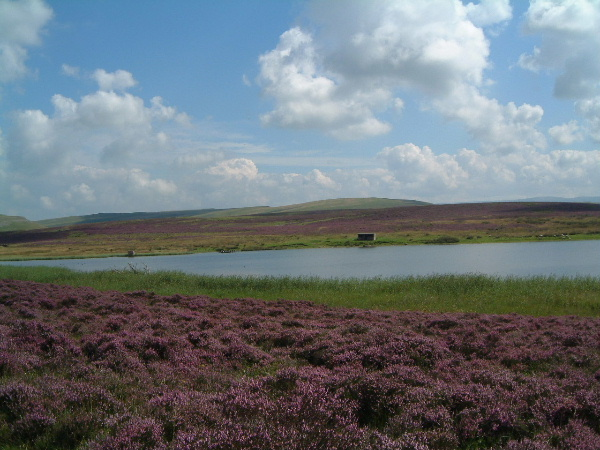

- Location within Cumbria
- Location of Sunbiggin Tarn & Moors and Little Asby Scar.
- Area of search: Cumbria
- Grid reference: NY685083
- Coordinates: 54.4634°N 2.5029°W
- Interest: Biological/Geological
- Area: 3.86 square miles (1,000.435 ha) for the full SSSI
- Notification date: 30 November 1994
- Location map: Magic Map (Defra)

Sunbiggin Tarn is a tarn near Sunbiggin in Cumbria. It is in a Site of Special Scientific Interest (SSSI) which also includes the surrounding moorland and limestone pavement of Little Asby Scar.

== Site content ==
=== Flora ===
common bent, mother of thyme, sheep fescue, Sesleria albicans, Galium sterneri grassland Calluna vulgaris Erica cinerea, Vaccinium myrtillus heath Scirpus cespitosus, Erica tetralix wet heath Carex elata, Equisetum fluviatile, Cladium mariscus, Carex rostrata, Potentilla palustris, Phragmites australis swamp, sedge and reed-beds

=== Fauna ===
black-headed gull, gadwall, little grebe, osprey, starling, water rail, wigeon Geyer's whorl snail

=== Geology ===
Dinantian, Karst
