= Grayrigg derailment =

2007 rail transport disaster in Grayrigg, England

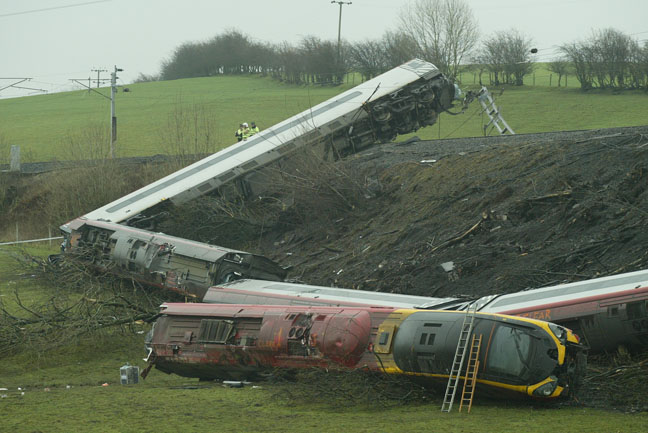
- The scene of the accident

Details
- Date: 23 February 2007; 20:15 GMT
- Location: Grayrigg, Cumbria
- Coordinates: 54°21′27″N 02°39′33″W
- Country: England
- Line: West Coast Main Line
- Operator: Virgin Trains
- Cause: Defective points due to poor maintenance and inspection procedures.

Statistics
- Trains: 1
- Passengers: 105 + 4 crew
- Deaths: 1
- Injured: 30 serious, 59 minor

The Grayrigg derailment was a fatal railway accident that occurred at approximately 20:15 GMT on Friday 23 February 2007, just to the south of Grayrigg, Cumbria, in the North West England region of the United Kingdom. The accident investigation concluded that the derailment was caused by a faulty set of points (number 2B) on the Down Main running line, controlled from Lambrigg ground frame. The scheduled inspection on 18 February 2007 had not taken place and the faults had gone undetected.

== Incident ==
The 17:30 Virgin West Coast Pendolino West Coast Main Line InterCity service from London Euston to Glasgow Central derailed at 20:15 at a faulty set of points almost immediately after crossing the Docker Viaduct (the rear half of the train would still have been crossing the bridge whilst the front derailed at the points). The train was reported to have been travelling at 95 mph (153 km/h) when it was derailed. The train consisted of unit 390033 City of Glasgow, which was constructed at Washwood Heath, Birmingham, in 2002; formed of a total of nine vehicles. It carried 105 passengers and four crew.

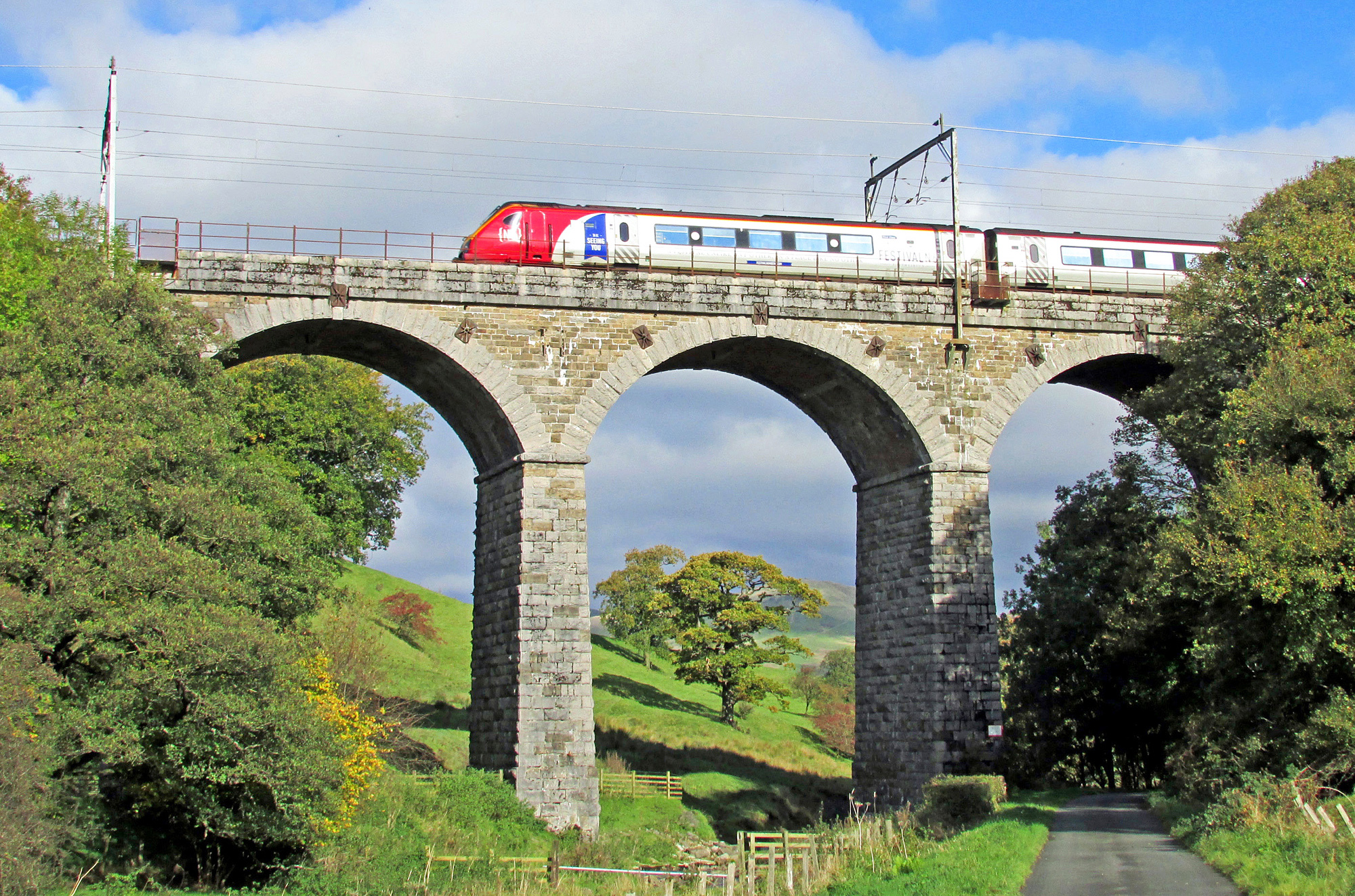
Docker Viaduct carrying the West Coast Main Line just south of the site of the accident. The rear half of the train would have been crossing the bridge whilst the front derailed at the points immediately north of the bridge.

Passengers said that the carriages of the train began rocking and swaying violently as the first coach left the rails. The momentum of the other vehicles caused the front of the second passenger carriage to jack-knife against the back of the first coach, eventually pushing it down the embankment and through 190 degrees, to face in the opposite direction to travel. The resulting forces led to the remaining seven coaches derailing, with all but one coming to rest in the adjacent field. Up to 500 rescuers attended the scene, along with at least 12 ambulances, at least five fire engines, three Royal Air Force Sea King search and rescue helicopters, the International Rescue Corps, three civilian mountain rescue teams plus RAF Leeming Mountain Rescue Team, and one Merseyside Police helicopter. The rescue operation was hindered by rain, darkness, and access problems caused by the narrow country lanes and muddy fields.

Live BBC television coverage at 08:15 the following morning showed that although the whole train had been derailed, the rear carriage was standing nearly upright on the sleepers and ballast. Standard class, the front five carriages, were the worst affected, and the rear four first class carriages were in better condition. The leading carriage, a driving motor coach, had headed down the embankment, and turned end-for-end as it fell. It was lying on its side at the foot of the embankment. The second carriage had jack-knifed against the first, breaking the coupling, and so had not followed it down the bank. This second carriage came to rest some distance further along the track, at a steep angle with one end in the air. The middle part of the train toppled sideways down the embankment, with a total of five carriages turning onto their sides. All the partially friction stir welded carriages remained structurally intact, with damage mainly confined to the crumple zones at their ends. In spite of the severity of the accident, damage to the windows was limited, and all but two of the passengers were contained within the train as it came to rest. The lighting in four vehicles failed during the derailment, leaving them in complete darkness. Most injuries occurred in the front two carriages.

Survivors were initially received at Grayrigg Primary School, which had been opened as a survivor reception centre. Hospitals in the area, including some over the Scottish border in Dumfries and Galloway, were put on standby, but not all received patients. According to BBC News, five passengers were admitted to Royal Preston Hospital in a critical condition. Police later released a statement revealing that one passenger, 84-year-old Margaret Masson from Glasgow, had died in hospital. Her funeral took place on 31 March 2007 at Craigton crematorium in Glasgow. Eighty per cent of the people on the train were injured to some extent, with the principal cause being secondary impacts – hitting (or being hit by) objects, the interior of the train, or other passengers as the carriage impacted the ground or other carriages. Exceptions to this were that one passenger was ejected and one passenger was partially ejected through emergency exit (egress) windows as the carriages came to a stop.

The location of the accident

== Aftermath ==
Within three hours of the derailment the site of the accident had been sealed off with a five-mile cordon. The line was expected to be closed for two weeks, with Virgin Trains saying that the line would not reopen to passenger services until 12 March 2007.

Sir Richard Branson, Virgin Group chairman, visited the site of the derailment at 11:00 the following morning to comment on the incident. During his news conference at the site he said that he regarded the driver, named as Iain Black from Dumbarton, as a hero, as he had attempted to stop the train and remained in his seat to ensure the safety of passengers. Black, who was seriously injured in the derailment, left hospital in late March and stated that "I've got to be in the cab to help the train and it never crossed my mind to leave."

Branson also later thanked local residents for their help at the accident site, describing how he "was very impressed to hear how those kind people rallied round, opening their hearts and opening their doors to strangers in distress". Local farmers assisted the emergency services by transporting equipment using quad bikes and four-wheel drive vehicles. Sergeant Jo Fawcett of the Cumbria Constabulary also offered thanks, saying that "There are so many people who have given up their own time to contribute in some way to dealing with the aftermath of the derailment that it would be unfair to name them for fear of missing someone out."

Branson also paid tribute to the Pendolino train, comparing it to a "tank". He also added "If the train had been old stock then the number of injuries and the mortalities would have been horrendous".

As a result of the suspicion that faulty points were the cause of the Grayrigg Derailment, Network Rail checked over 700 sets of similar points across the country as a "precautionary measure" saying later that "nothing of concern" had been found.

The operation to remove the train from the site began on the evening of 1 March 2007 with the first carriages moved from the embankment. This allowed passengers' property to be retrieved and gave investigators access to the train interior, which previously had not been possible because it would have been unsafe. The last of the carriages were removed on 4 March 2007 and the A685 road was reopened.

In 2013, British Transport Police (BTP) posthumously awarded a Chief Constable's Commendation to a member of BTP staff, Jon Ratcliffe, who was at the time of the disaster media and marketing manager for BTP's North Western area. He received the commendation for his good handling of media enquires in the aftermath of the crash. Ratcliffe had died in 2008 following a sudden illness.

== Cause ==
Lambrigg ground frame, 660 yards (600 m) south-west of the accident site, controlled two crossovers, each one comprising two sets of points allowing trains to cross from one running line to the other in emergencies or during track maintenance work. These points were used only occasionally, operated locally after a release was obtained from Carlisle power signal box.

Investigations were launched by the Rail Accident Investigation Branch and Her Majesty's Railway Inspectorate. RMT rail union leader Bob Crow said on BBC News that a points failure was responsible for the incident. Experts compared the cause to that of the Potters Bar rail crash in 2002.

On 26 February, an interim report published by the Rail Accident Investigation Branch outlined the current progress of the investigation. The report contained a single conclusion, that the immediate cause of the accident was the condition of the stretcher bar arrangement at points 2B at Lambrigg crossover, which resulted in the loss of gauge separation of the point switch blades. The stretcher bars (components that hold the moving blades of the points the correct distance apart) had been found to be disconnected or missing. Of the three bars, one was not in position, another had nuts and bolts missing, and two were fractured.

Following the RAIB interim report, Network Rail released a statement in which its chief executive, John Armitt, described how the organisation was "devastated to conclude that the condition of the set of points at Grayrigg caused this terrible accident". He apologised "to all the people affected by the failure of the infrastructure".

The RAIB report noted that the Network Rail New Measurement Train ran over the site on 21 February. This train uses lasers and other instruments to make measurements of the track geometry and other features such as overhead line height and stagger, and the track gauge, twist and cant. It is not used to inspect points, but it does make a video record of the track which can be reviewed later. Responding to the suggestion that the train's video might have been used to detect the points damage and thereby prevent the accident, a Network Rail spokesman said:

The [inspection] train runs at speeds of up to 125 mph, or 95 mph on this stretch. There would be no point somebody watching it at that speed as they wouldn't be able to pick up any faults. It has to be run in super-slow motion to spot faults. The train runs for up to 18 hours a day, seven days a week. It would probably take someone most of the month to watch one day's worth of data. It's not what it's there for. It's a backwards reference tool.

Network Rail admitted it failed to carry out a scheduled visual track inspection in the area on the Sunday before the derailment.

As part of the investigation by the British Transport Police, three Network Rail employees were arrested and bailed, one in July 2007 and two in November 2007. All three were due to answer bail in March 2008 but this was extended until the end of June pending further inquiries. On 9 February 2009, the British Transport Police confirmed that none of the three Network Rail employees arrested in connection with the derailment would be charged following advice from the Crown Prosecution Service.

== Subsequent service disruption ==
Immediately after the accident, all West Coast services were suspended and the First ScotRail Sleeper train, the Caledonian Sleeper, was curtailed and passengers transferred to overnight coaches.

The line closure that followed the initial service suspension saw most Virgin services terminate at Preston or Lancaster from the south, with buses to Carlisle and all stations along the route.

Trains began running on the line again on 12 March subject to a speed restriction of 50 mph (80 km/h) at the crash site. The first train was the 05:10 Manchester to Glasgow.

== Prosecution ==
On 13 January 2012, the Office of Rail Regulation announced that Network Rail was to be prosecuted under section 3(1) of the Health and Safety at Work etc. Act 1974 for "the company's failure to provide and implement suitable and sufficient standards, procedures, guidance, training, tools and resources for the inspection and maintenance of fixed stretcher bar points". At the first hearing at Lancaster Magistrates' Court on 28 February 2012, Network Rail indicated an intention to plead guilty to the charges. On 4 April 2012, Network Rail was fined a total of £4,118,037 including costs following the court case.

Critical commentary appeared in the media concerning the knighthood awarded to John Armitt in the 2012 New Year Honours for services to engineering and construction. Armitt had been chief executive of Network Rail at the time of the Grayrigg derailment, and the family of the victim of the accident criticised the award, which coincidentally was conferred on the same day that Network Rail was prosecuted for the accident.

After a two-week hearing on one of the issues, coroner Ian Smith announced was that he would be issuing a rule 43 report. The intention of the report is to raise concerns with authorities to prevent similar incidents occurring again.

== See also ==
- List of rail accidents in the United Kingdom
- List of rail accidents (2000–2009)
- 2025 Shap derailment, a later incident involving the derailment of a Class 390 Pendolino nearby
