= Shap railway station =

Former railway station in Westmorland, England

Coordinates: 54.5230°N 2.6706°W

Shap

General information
- Location: Shap, Westmorland and Furness; England
- Platforms: 2

Other information
- Status: Disused

History
- Original company: Lancaster and Carlisle Railway
- Pre-grouping: London and North Western Railway
- Post-grouping: London, Midland and Scottish Railway

Key dates
- 17 December 1846: Opened
- 1 July 1968: Closed
Location
- Location within the former Eden District Location within Cumbria

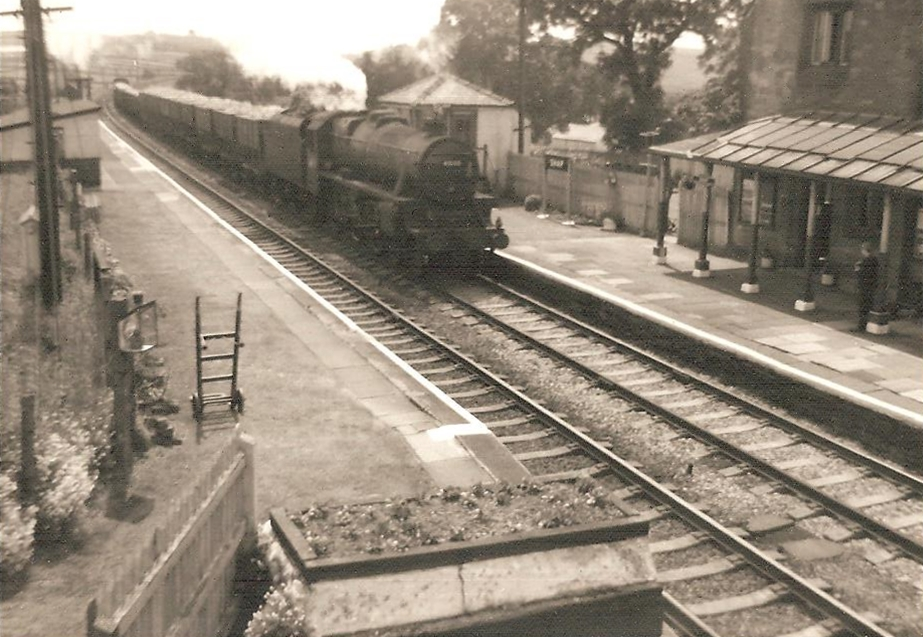
An 8F heads north through Shap station, 1967

Shap railway station served the village of Shap, Westmorland (now in Cumbria), England for over 120 years.

== Operations ==
The station was situated on the West Coast Main Line and was opened on 17 December 1846, when the section of the Lancaster and Carlisle Railway was opened between Oxenholme (for Kendal) and Carlisle.

Shap station passed into the hands of the London and North Western Railway very soon after opening and that company operated it until amalgamation into the London Midland and Scottish Railway (LMSR) in 1923. British Railways took over operation on 1 January 1948, but closed the station to passengers on 1 July 1968.

Shap station was located 3/4 mile (1.2 km) south of the centre of the village, with access being provided from the A6 Road. In 1922, five trains for Carlisle called at Shap on weekdays, with a further two local trains to Penrith. A similar service operated southbound.

== Notes ==
Preceding station	Historical railways	Following station
Tebay	London and North Western Railway; Lancaster and Carlisle Railway	Clifton and Lowther
