= 2025 Shap derailment =

Railway incident in Cumbria, England

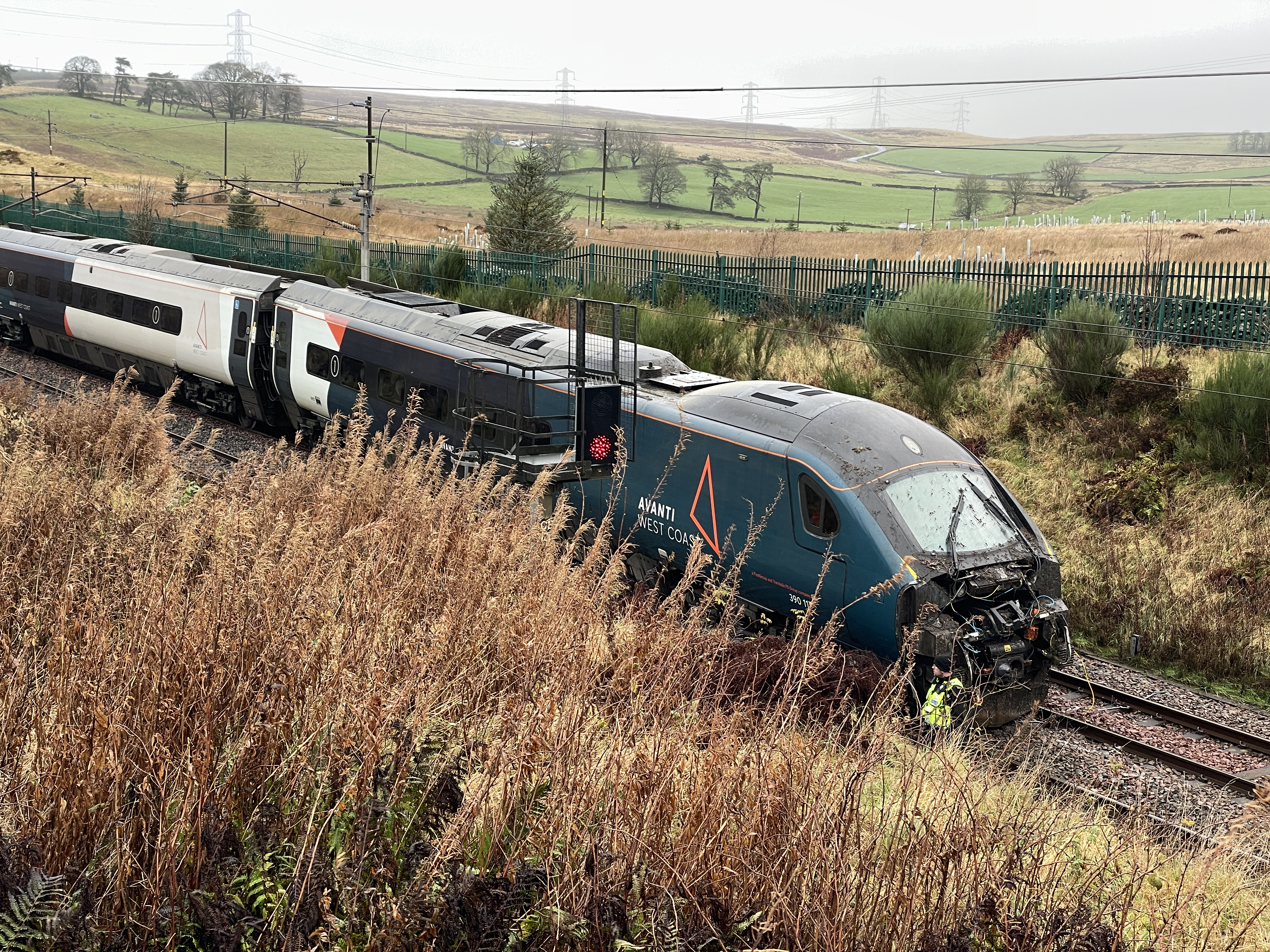
- Front carriages of the derailed train

- Location of accident within Cumbria

Details
- Date: 3 November 2025; 06:10
- Location: Shap Rural, Cumbria, England
- Coordinates: 54°29′06″N 2°39′03″W
- Country: United Kingdom
- Line: West Coast Main Line
- Operator: Avanti West Coast
- Service: 1R22 04:28 Glasgow Central – London Euston
- Incident type: Derailment
- Cause: Obstruction on line due to landslip

Statistics
- Trains: 1
- Passengers: 86
- Crew: 9
- Injured: 4

The 2025 Shap derailment occurred on 3 November 2025 when a passenger train operated by Avanti West Coast ran into a landslide obstructing the West Coast Main Line at Shap Rural, Cumbria, England. Four minor injuries were reported.

== Incident ==
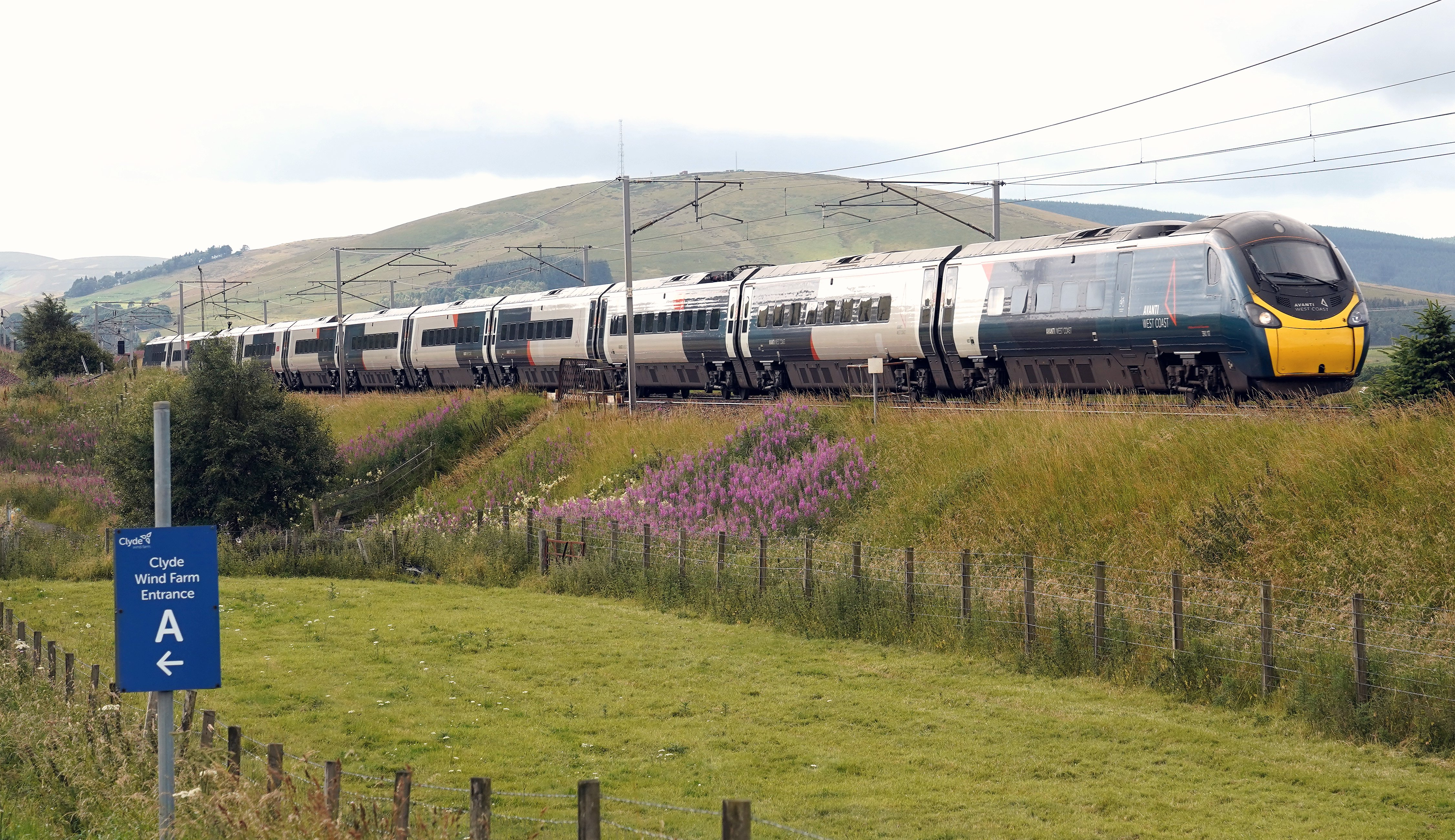
The train involved in the derailment, pictured in July 2024.

At 06:10 (GMT) on 3 November 2025, an Avanti West Coast passenger train was derailed approximately 1 mile (1,500 m) south of Shap Summit on the West Coast Main Line (WCML) in Cumbria. The service involved was the 04:28 Glasgow Central to London Euston (service 1R22), operated by a British Rail Class 390 Pendolino (unit number 390117). The train was travelling at approximately 83 mph (134 km/h) when it struck the landslide and ran derailed for about 560 m (1,840 ft). Photographs show that both of the leading vehicle's bogies and the front bogie of the second vehicle had derailed. All 95 people on board (86 passengers and 9 crew) were evacuated and taken to the Shap Wells Hotel, walking along the track to reach the hotel. Four minor injuries were reported; some passengers were reported to have suffered from shock. All the passengers had been escorted off and taken to their onward destinations by 10:40.

An initial report published by the Rail Accident Investigation Branch (RAIB) on 12 November stated "a drainage channel, which runs across the slope above the washed-out material, was unable to accommodate the volume of water which was present. This led to the slope material below becoming saturated, initiating the landslip."

== Aftermath ==
The North West Ambulance Service declared a major incident, which was stood down at 10:20. Disruption to services on the WCML between Carlisle and Preston was expected to last for many days. Avanti West Coast advised people not to attempt to travel north of Preston for the rest of the day. TransPennine Express services were also affected, being unable to run between Carlisle and Preston. Passengers were advised to avoid travelling if possible. The train was re-railed and removed from the site during the night of 3–4 November and was hauled to Carlisle by Class 57 locomotive 57 309. The WCML through Shap reopened at 19:19 on 4 November, with Network Rail advising passengers that the normal timetable would resume on 5 November. Incumbent local MP Tim Farron and General Secretary of train drivers' union ASLEF Mick Whelan both issued statements requesting that Network Rail be given suitable funding to prevent similar incidents in the area.

== Investigations ==
The Rail Accident Investigation Branch (RAIB) despatched a team of investigators to the site. They announced a formal investigation into the accident on 12 November. On 19 December 2025, the RAIB issued an Urgent Safety Advice. The location where the derailment occurred was under remote monitoring, but the equipment had not been formally taken into service, and was therefore not sending an alert to Network Rail's control centre.

Network Rail and the Office of Rail and Road also opened investigations into the accident.

== See also ==
- List of rail accidents in the United Kingdom
- Grayrigg derailment, an incident involving the derailment of a Class 390 Pendolino nearby in 2007
- Stonehaven derailment, a previous derailment involving a train colliding with a landslip
