= Shap =

Village and civil parish in Cumbria, England

Coordinates: 54.529°N 2.676°W

- Village and parish
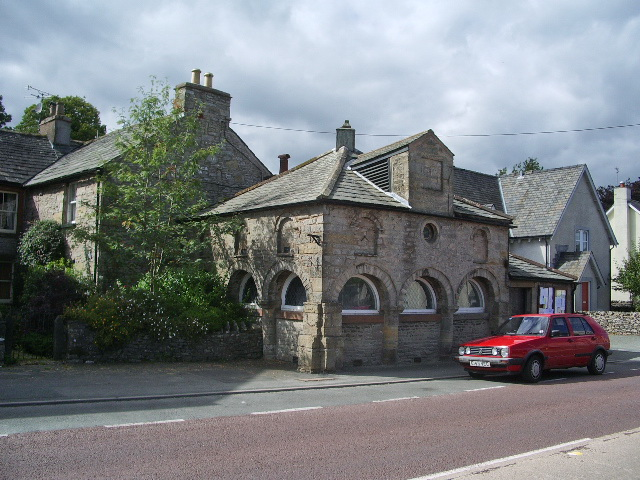
- Shap Market Cross

- Location in the former Eden District, Cumbria Location within Cumbria
- Interactive map showing the parish boundary
- Population: 1,218 (2021 census)
- OS grid reference: NY563150
- Civil parish: Shap
- Unitary authority: Westmorland and Furness
- Ceremonial county: Cumbria
- Region: North West
- Country: England
- Sovereign state: United Kingdom
- Post town: Penrith
- Postcode district: CA10
- Dialling code: 01931
- Police: Cumbria
- Fire: Cumbria
- Ambulance: North West
- UK Parliament: Westmorland and Lonsdale

Shap is a village and civil parish located among fells and isolated dales in Westmorland and Furness, Cumbria, England. At the 2021 census, the parish had a population of 1,218.

Historically in the county of Westmorland, the village lies along the A6 road and the West Coast Main Line, and is near to the M6 motorway. It is situated 10 miles (16 km) from Penrith and about 15 miles (24 km) from Kendal. It is on the route of the Coast to Coast Walk.

== Toponymy ==
Early (12th and 13th century) forms such as Hep and Yheppe point to an Old Norse rendering Hjáp of an Old English original Hēap = "heap" (of stones), probably referring to an ancient stone circle, cairn or to the Shap Stone Avenue just to the west of the village.

== History ==
Although Shap is a small village in terms of population, it is legally a market town with a charter dating from the 17th century. At one time, the granite works situated a mile outside the village was a separate community, with its own Co-op store. Shap polished pink granite can be found in many buildings in the UK, including outside St Paul's Cathedral in London.

The village also lies at the centre of one of Britain's most important prehistoric ritual landscapes. The surrounding area contains a remarkable concentration of Neolithic and Bronze Age monuments, including numerous stone circles, burial cairns, standing stones and henges, making the Eden Valley one of the richest megalithic landscapes in northern England. Archaeologists have identified at least eleven stone circles and numerous burial monuments in the vicinity, with major ceremonial complexes extending towards Penrith and Long Meg.

The most significant monument is Shap Stone Avenue, a vast ceremonial complex constructed during the Late Neolithic. Originally extending for around 2 miles (3.2 km), it comprised a long avenue of standing stones linked to stone circles, burial cairns and other monuments. Before much of it was destroyed from the eighteenth century onwards, antiquarians including William Stukeley regarded it as comparable in scale and importance to Avebury in Wiltshire. Although only fragments survive today, Shap Avenue is recognised as one of the largest and most significant prehistoric ceremonial monuments in Britain.

Other important prehistoric monuments lie around the village. White Raise is an Early Bronze Age round cairn on the hills west of Shap, excavated in the nineteenth century, where cremated human remains and fragments of a decorated urn were discovered. To the north, Gunnerkeld stone circle is one of England's largest concentric stone circles, comprising an outer ring of nineteen granite megaliths surrounding an inner circle of thirty-one stones. An additional concentric circle, Shapbeck stone circle, was discovered on the eastern edge of Knipe Scar.

On 3 November 2025, a Glasgow to London Avanti West Coast train with 86 passengers and five crew derailed near the village due to a landslide. There were four minor injuries.

== Geography ==
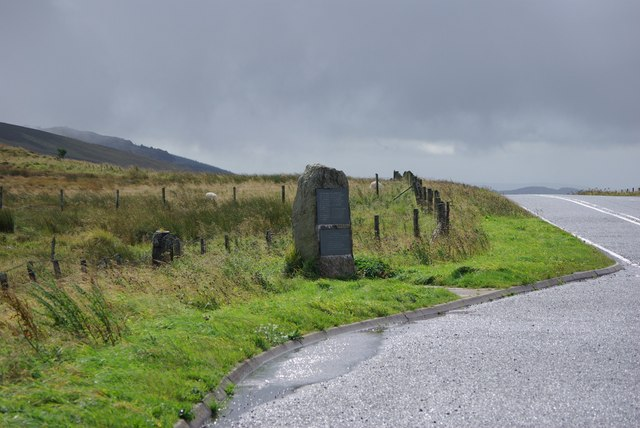
Shap Summit on the A6 road

Shap Summit is located on the motorway at NY583120 and the railway at NY570110. Before the M6 opened, Shap Fell used to be notorious for the difficult and dangerous stretch of A6 for drivers, and it includes a well-known section of the West Coast Main Line. It has a 1:75 gradient for trains heading north, and in the days of steam locomotives banking engines from Tebay were often used to assist trains. It has been popular with railway photographers and there have been many pictures published taken in the area, most notably at Scout Green which lies on the southern approach to the hill.

Shap Fell NY530088 is known for Shap granite, a pink rock rich in orthoclase, quartz and biotite; Shap Pink Quarry NY557083 takes its name from this.

=== Climate ===
Shap has a oceanic climate (Köppen: Cfb), like the vast majority of the British Isles.

At an elevation of 255 m (837 ft), Shap is notably cooler as well as wetter than surrounding lowland areas, and considerably wetter than lowland Southern England, as it is exposed to the prevailing west-southwesterlies enhanced by orographic lift.

Climate data for Shap, Elevation: 255 m (837 ft), 1991–2020 normals
Month	Jan	Feb	Mar	Apr	May	Jun	Jul	Aug	Sep	Oct	Nov	Dec	Year
Mean daily maximum °C (°F)	5.7 (42.3)	6.2 (43.2)	8.2 (46.8)	11.1 (52.0)	14.2 (57.6)	16.7 (62.1)	18.4 (65.1)	17.9 (64.2)	15.6 (60.1)	12.1 (53.8)	8.5 (47.3)	6.2 (43.2)	11.8 (53.2)
Daily mean °C (°F)	3.0 (37.4)	3.2 (37.8)	4.6 (40.3)	6.8 (44.2)	9.4 (48.9)	12.3 (54.1)	14.1 (57.4)	13.7 (56.7)	11.6 (52.9)	8.6 (47.5)	5.5 (41.9)	3.2 (37.8)	8.0 (46.4)
Mean daily minimum °C (°F)	0.3 (32.5)	0.1 (32.2)	1.1 (34.0)	2.4 (36.3)	4.6 (40.3)	7.8 (46.0)	9.7 (49.5)	9.5 (49.1)	7.5 (45.5)	5.1 (41.2)	2.4 (36.3)	0.2 (32.4)	4.3 (39.7)
Average precipitation mm (inches)	233.5 (9.19)	189.5 (7.46)	141.4 (5.57)	93.4 (3.68)	98.6 (3.88)	100.3 (3.95)	106.7 (4.20)	133.5 (5.26)	131.1 (5.16)	184.9 (7.28)	205.0 (8.07)	245.2 (9.65)	1,862.9 (73.34)
Source: Met Office

== Governance ==
The civil parish of Shap (formerly Shap Urban Parish) includes the hamlet of Keld and parts of the granite works and limestone works. The parish shares a joint parish council with Shap Rural, which surrounds Shap parish making it an enclave of Shap Rural. The two parishes were created in 1905 by dividing the ancient parish of Shap.

For local government purposes, the village is in Westmorland and Furness. Historically, Shap was in the West Ward of Westmorland, and upon the introduction of urban and rural districts in 1894 it became part of West Ward Rural District. In 1905, the town became an urban district, but this was abolished just 20 years later when the town joined North Westmorland Rural District. From 1974, it was in the Eden District of the new county of Cumbria, until the present Westmorland and Furness unitary district was created in 2023.

Shap is in the parliamentary constituency of Westmorland and Lonsdale.

== Demographics ==
At the 2021 census, the civil parish had a population of 1,218 people in 573 households.

Census population of Shap parish
Census	Population	Female	Male	Households	Source
2001	1,221	607	614	527	
2011	1,264	625	639	567	
2021	1,218	618	600	573	

== Landmarks ==
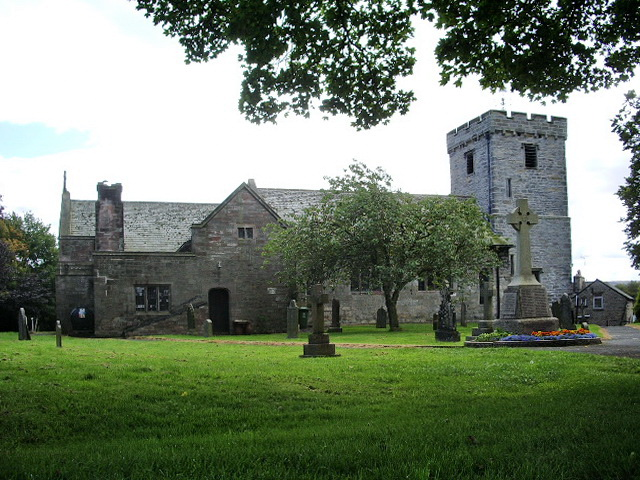
St. Michael's Church

Shap Abbey is located about 1 mile due west of the village, in the secluded valley of the River Lowther. It was originally built in 1199 by canons of the Premonstratensian Order, who obtained the land from Thomas, a local baron. The Abbey was one of the last abbeys to be dissolved by Henry VIII in 1540.

Shap Wells has a mineral spa located in the grounds of the Shap Wells hotel. The hotel was used in World War II as a prisoner of war camp.

== Culture and community ==
The village has a library, operated as "Shap Library Link" by the local council.

In his novel Can You Forgive Her?, Anthony Trollope locates Vavasor Hall—the manor where the Squire resides—in the vicinity of Shap; the Squire is the grandfather of Alice, Kate, and George, three of the novel’s main characters.

In M. W. Craven's novels, Shap Wells hotel is often used as a hub for the stories since one of the main characters, Washington Poe, lives nearby.

== Transport ==
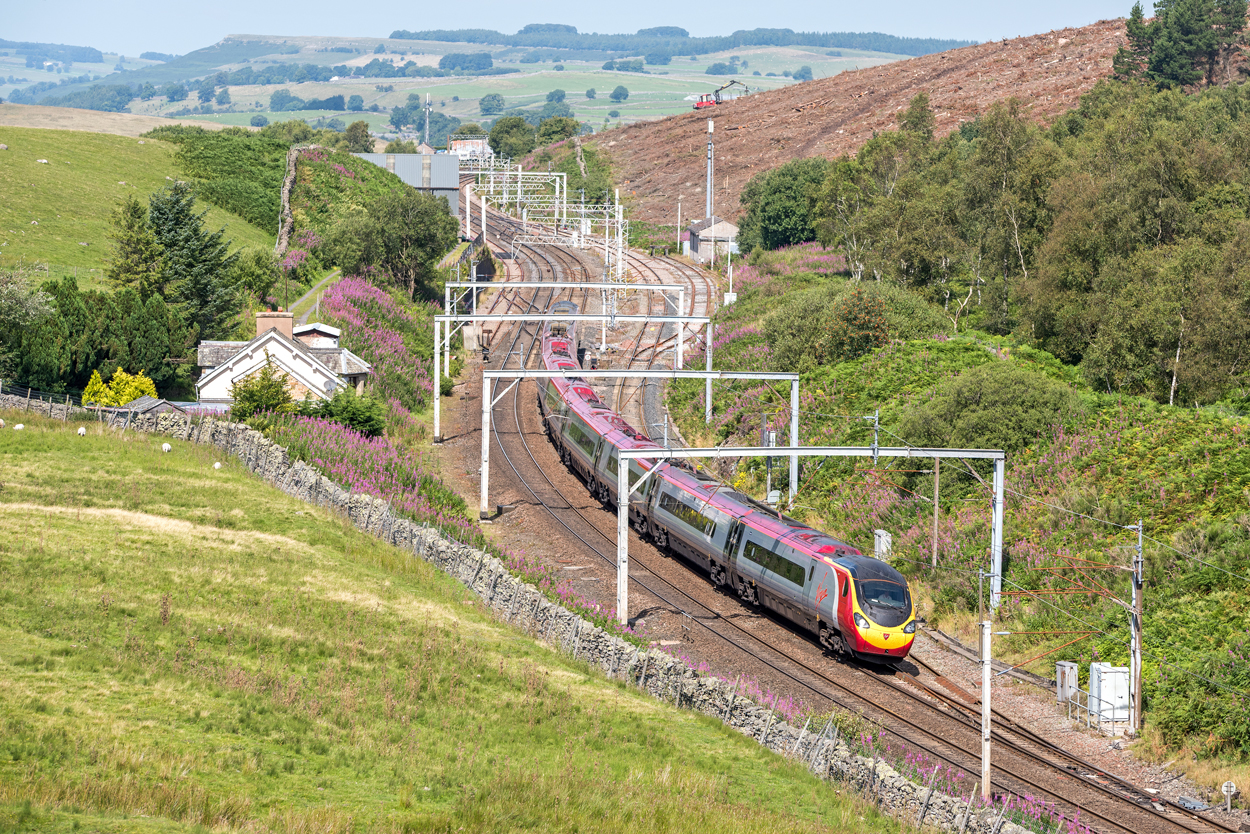
Train at Shap Summit – August 2016

The Lancaster and Carlisle Railway (now part of the West Coast Main Line), opened on 17 December 1846, and runs along the eastern edge of the village. Shap Summit is the highest point on the West Coast Mainline in England, topped only by Beattock Summit in Scotland. Shap station was closed in 1968, though there have been calls for its re-opening. Penrith is now the closest station and is situated on the West Coast Main Line. Penrith has train services to Glasgow, Edinburgh, Manchester, Birmingham and London.

Shap is the terminus of Stagecoach bus route 106 from Penrith via Lowther Castle.

== Notable people ==
- Sir Charles Richardson (1769-1850), Royal Navy officer was born in the village
