= Greenholme =

Hamlet in Cumbria, England

Coordinates: 54.445181°N 2.621617°W

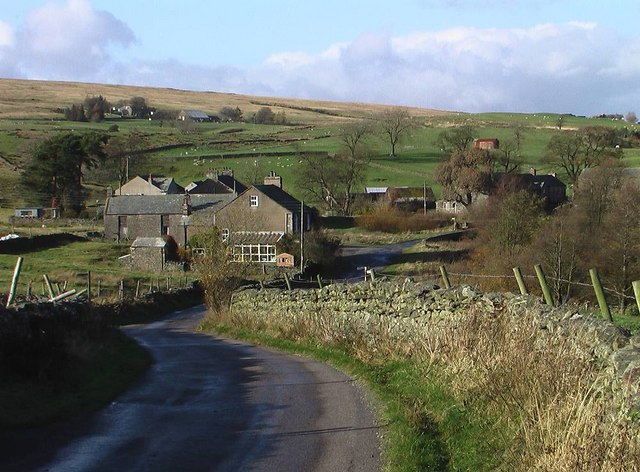
Greenholme Village - geograph.org.uk - 604604

Greenholme is a hamlet in Cumbria, England.

The Greenholme Gala and Agricultural Show is held there annually.

Greenholme Bridge crosses the Birk Beck in the hamlet. This bridge appears upon a 1679 list of public bridges.

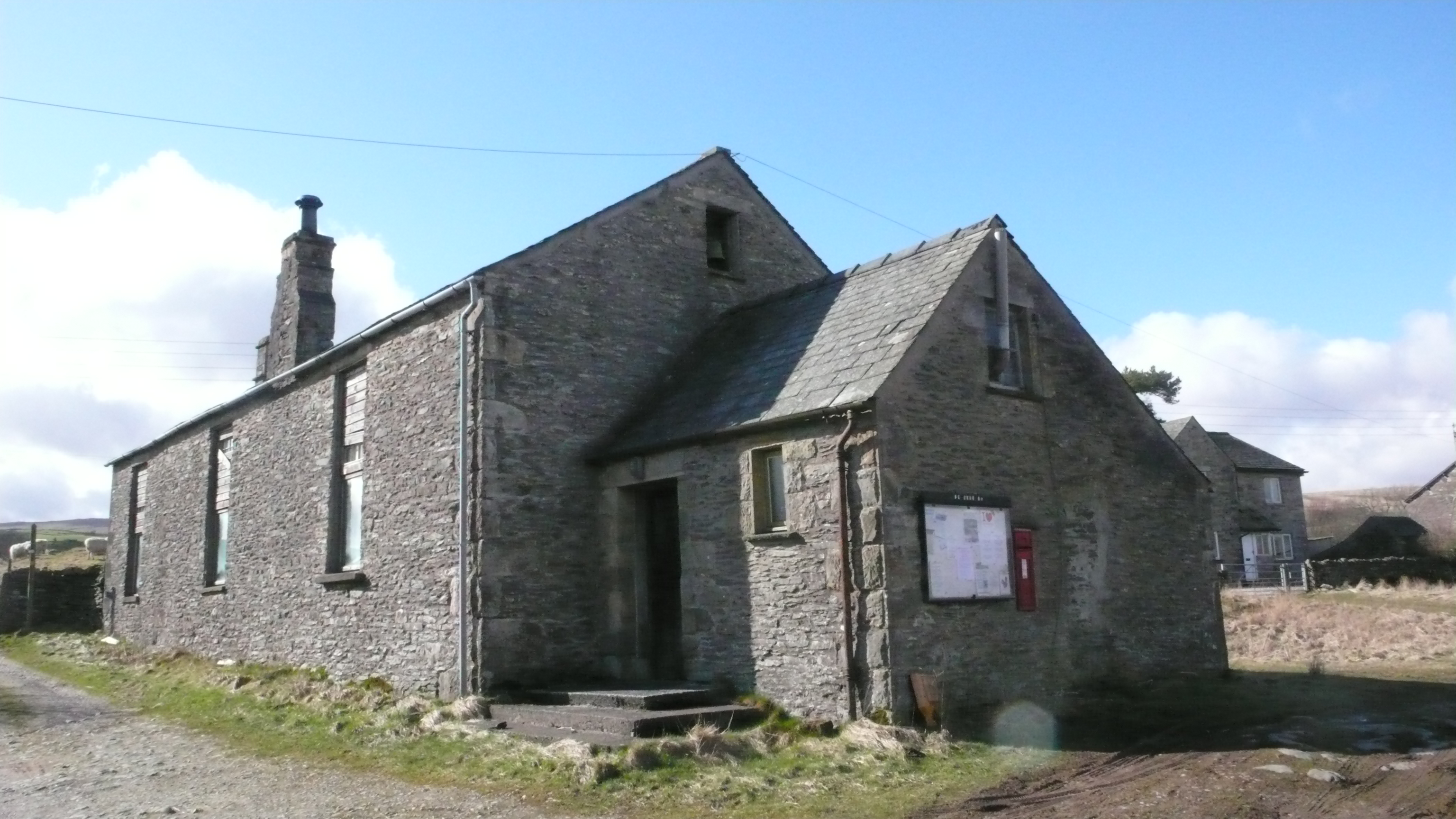
Greenholme School building

Greenholme School was founded in 1733 as a Free Grammar School, and as of 1817 held 20 to 40 pupils. It closed c.1963.

The hamlet of Lower Greenholme some 600 yards to the south-east is the site of a putative motte-and-bailey castle, located on the south bank of where the Birk Beck bends sharply east, and conjectured to be an outpost of Castle Howe, although the site is currently interpreted as probably consisting of only natural features.
