= A685 road =

Road in Cumbria, England

A685

Major junctions
- From: Kendal; 54.3325°N 2.7388°W
- A6 A684; M6 A683; A66
- To: Brough; 54.5244°N 2.3188°W

Location
- Country: United Kingdom

Road network
- Roads in the United Kingdom; Motorways; A and B road zones

The A685 is a road in Cumbria, England, that runs 28 miles (45 km) from Kendal to Brough.

== Route ==
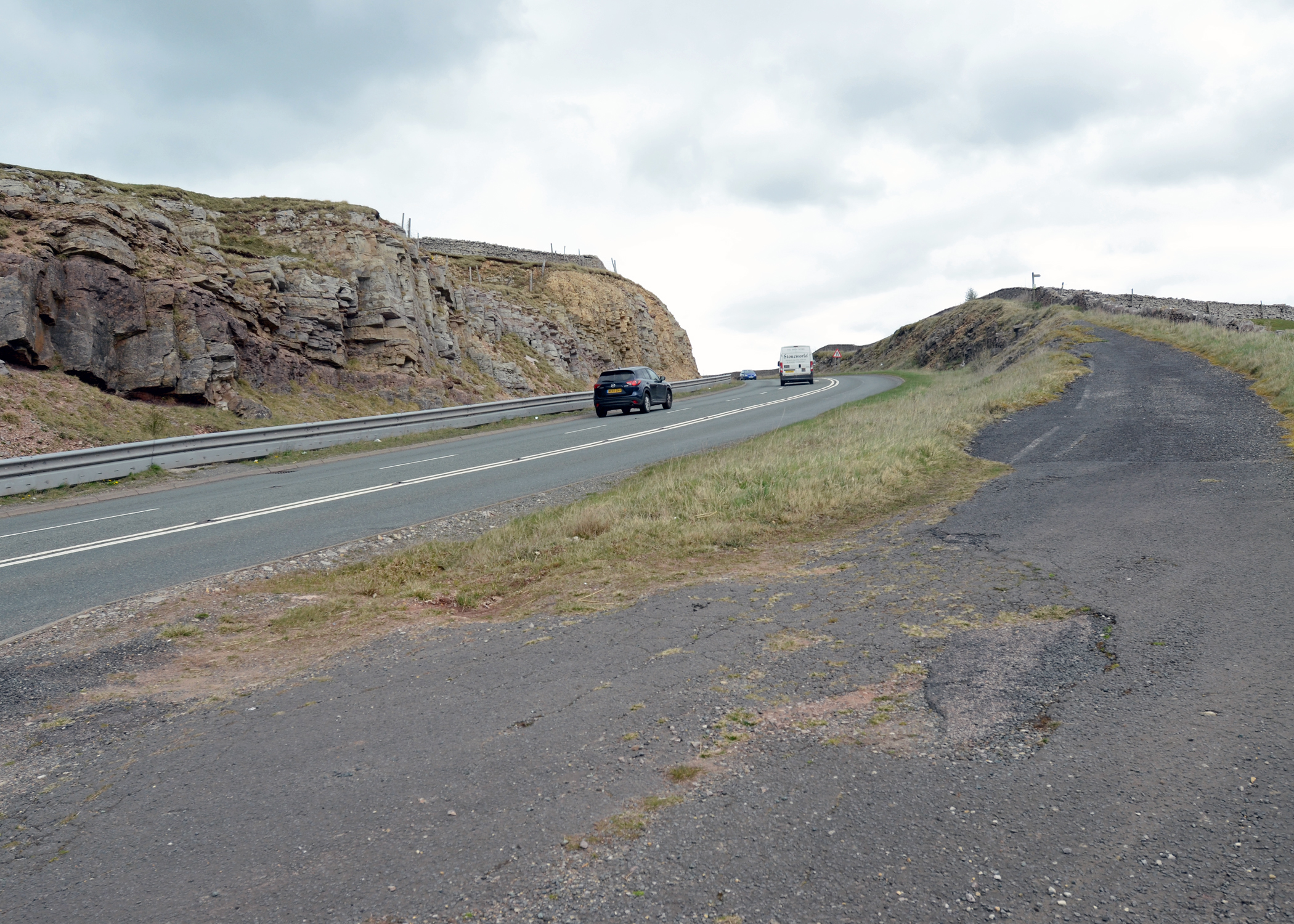
Looking Eastwards on the top and western edge of Ash Fell Edge with the new A685 cutting. The old road can be seen on the right.

The A685 begins in Kendal town centre off the A6. It heads in a north-easterly direction to the village of Tebay and junction 38 of the M6 motorway. From the M6 the A685 has primary status as it heads in an easterly and then north-easterly direction to the small town of Kirkby Stephen. It then has a very short dual carriageway section to aid overtaking, prior to meeting the A66 just outside the small town of Brough, where it terminates. From Newbiggin-on-Lune to Tebay the road follows the route of the former South Durham & Lancashire Union Railway.

The section from Tebay to Kirkby Stephen is banned to HGVs because of height and weight restrictions; HGVs have to go up to Penrith and then come south on the A66.
