= Flag of Westmorland =

Flag of English historic county

Westmorland
- Proportion: 3:5
- Adopted: 1926
- Design: A golden heraldic apple tree (for Appleby) on white and red bars (for Kendal)
- Designed by: College of Arms

The Westmorland flag is used to represent the historic county of Westmorland, England. It is the banner of arms of the coat of arms of the defunct Westmorland County Council, which were granted to the council by the College of Arms in 1926 and used until its abolition in 1974.

== Design ==
The flag has a white field across which are two red bars with a gold seven-branched apple tree on top. The blazon, or heraldic description of the coat of arms, is argent two bars gules over all an apple tree with seven branches fructed and eradicated or.

The two red bars on the flag are taken from the arms of the de Lancaster family, barons of Kendal, and the stylised apple tree is taken from the thirteenth-century seal of the Borough of Appleby. The flag therefore represents the two parts of the county: the Barony of Kendal, which covered the southwestern part of the county including the towns of Kendal and Kirkby Lonsdale; and the Barony of Westmorland, which covered the northern part of the county including Appleby-in-Westmorland.

=== Colours ===
Scheme	White	Gold	Red
Pantone (Paper)	White	116 C	485 C
Web colours	#FFFFFF	#FFCD00	#DA291C
RGB	255, 255, 255	255, 205, 0	218, 41, 28
CMYK	0%, 0%, 0%, 0%	0%, 20%, 100%, 0%	0%, 81%, 87%, 15%

== History ==
Arms of Westmorland County Council

The flag is the banner of arms of the now-defunct Westmorland County Council, granted by the College of Arms in 1926. The shield combines elements from the two baronies of the county, Kendal and Westmorland. The background of two red bars on a white background was taken from the arms of the de Lancaster family, who were Barons of Kendal. The stylised golden apple tree was taken from the thirteenth century seal of the borough of Appleby, a canting arms of the name of the town. The arms were created in the 1920s.

The flag was registered to the flag institute, as the Westmorland County Council went defunct in 1974. During the registration process of the flag, Chief Vexillologist Graham Bartram suggested the removal of the black edges inherited from the shield. Various local town councils and sports clubs supported the official adoption of the flag, which was duly registered.

=== Use ===
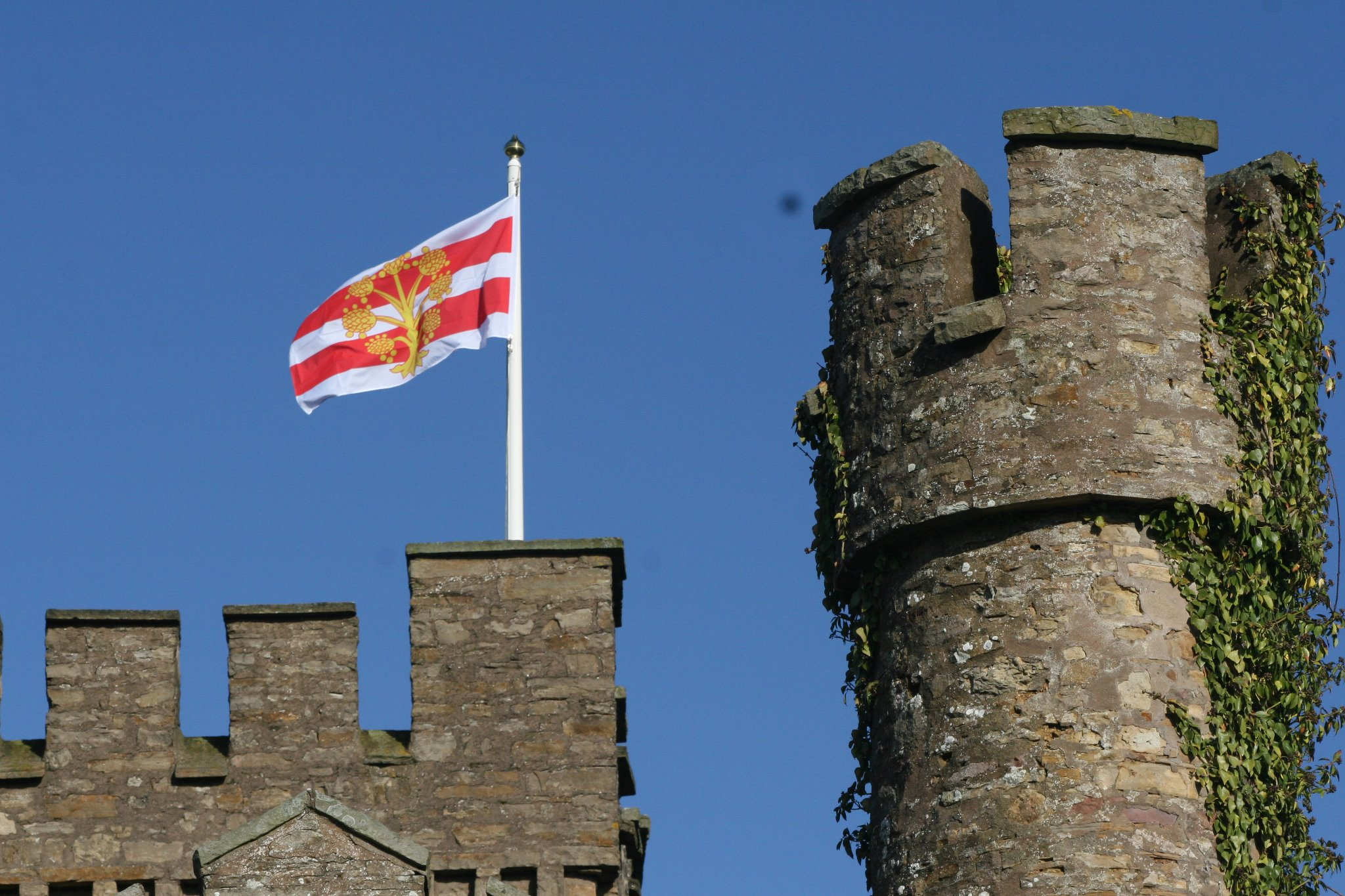
The flag flying at Augill Castle, Kirkby Stephen

The design has been registered with the Flag Institute, a charity which promotes vexillology, by the Westmorland Association. The MP for Westmorland and Lonsdale, Tim Farron, said:

"I’d like to congratulate the Westmorland Association for successfully registering the flag.
I hope that it will be enthusiastically adopted by all of us who are lucky enough to live and work in this amazing area. I look forward to seeing it flying high when I am travelling around the South Lakes"

The flag was flown outside the offices of the Department for Communities and Local Government in London as part of Westmorland Day celebrations.

It is used in the logo of the Westmorland County Football Association.
