= John de Lancastre, 1st Baron Lancastre =

English knight (about 1265–1334)

John de Lancaster (or de Loncastre etc.) of Grisedale and Stanstead (about 1265–1334) was an English knight, and a parliamentary baron in the Peerage of England. He was the first and last in his line to be called to parliament, as he had no heir. He was therefore the only "Lord Lancaster" or "Baron Lancaster" apart from the separate titles which belonged to a branch of the royal family descended from Edmund Crouchback. His father's family had many lordships in northwestern England (modern Cumbria and Lancashire), including Grisedale (in Patterdale, near Helvellyn); while his mother's family made him an heir to important lordships in other parts of England, including Stansted Mountfitchet in Essex.

== Family ==
John de Lancastre's father Roger de Lancastre "of Rydal" (died about 1290) was an illegitimate younger brother to the last feudal baron of the Barony of Kendal before it was divided, which was William de Lancastre III, the son of Gilbert fitz Reinfrid and Hawise de Lancaster. As Ragg (p. 401) therefore noted, this means that he had "not a drop of de Lancaster blood" from Hawise's family who were the original de Lancaster family of the barony of Kendal. Nevertheless, Roger was given "ample possessions in Westmorland and Lancashire" and consistently referred to with the second name of "de Lancaster" (with various spelling variations). While Roger's mother is unknown, Ragg proposed that she may have been the illegitimate daughter of William de Stuteville, whose marriage rights Gilbert fitz Reinfrid seems to have purchased in 1212.

It is from Roger that John inherited many lands in Westmorland and surrounding areas, including Rydal, which he held in chief, directly under the king. During the 1260s, Roger was also summoned to give council to the king as one of the "keepers of the counties" in the north, possibly Lancashire. This was during the time of Simon de Montfort. In 1265 Roger had become Sheriff of Lancaster for life, and replaced his friend and kinsman Roger de Leybourne as keeper of the royal forest, north of the river Trent.

John's mother was an important heiress, Phillipa de Bolebec, eldest daughter and one of three co-heiresses of Sir Hugh de Bolbec, who was lord of the feudal barony of Styford, Northumberland, and of a third of the already divided feudal barony of Stansted Mounfitchet. This included Stansted itself and "Lancaster's manor" in Barrington in Cambridgeshire. During his own lifetime, John succeeded to increase his share so that he held the entire Styford inheritance, and half the Mountfitchet inheritance.

John had at least two brothers, both of whom apparently had no legitimate children.

- A younger brother Roger was expected to survive him is mentioned in documents concerning John's inheritance, as someone who would inherit certain properties for his own lifetime only.
- Another brother William was mentioned as a cleric. He was involved in a dispute about assigning an archdeacon in Beetham.

John's wife, who survived him, was named Annora, but her origins are unknown.

== Life ==
John, sometimes described as a banneret, represented England in both warfare and other missions in Scotland. He was present for example at the siege of Caerlaverock in 1300. In the Roll of Caerlaverock, written in medieval French, his arms were compared to those of Thomas de Multon, and are the same as those of the earlier Lancaster barons of Kendal, his paternal grandfathers' wife's family. Despite his line being illegitimate, he and his father used their surname and arms.

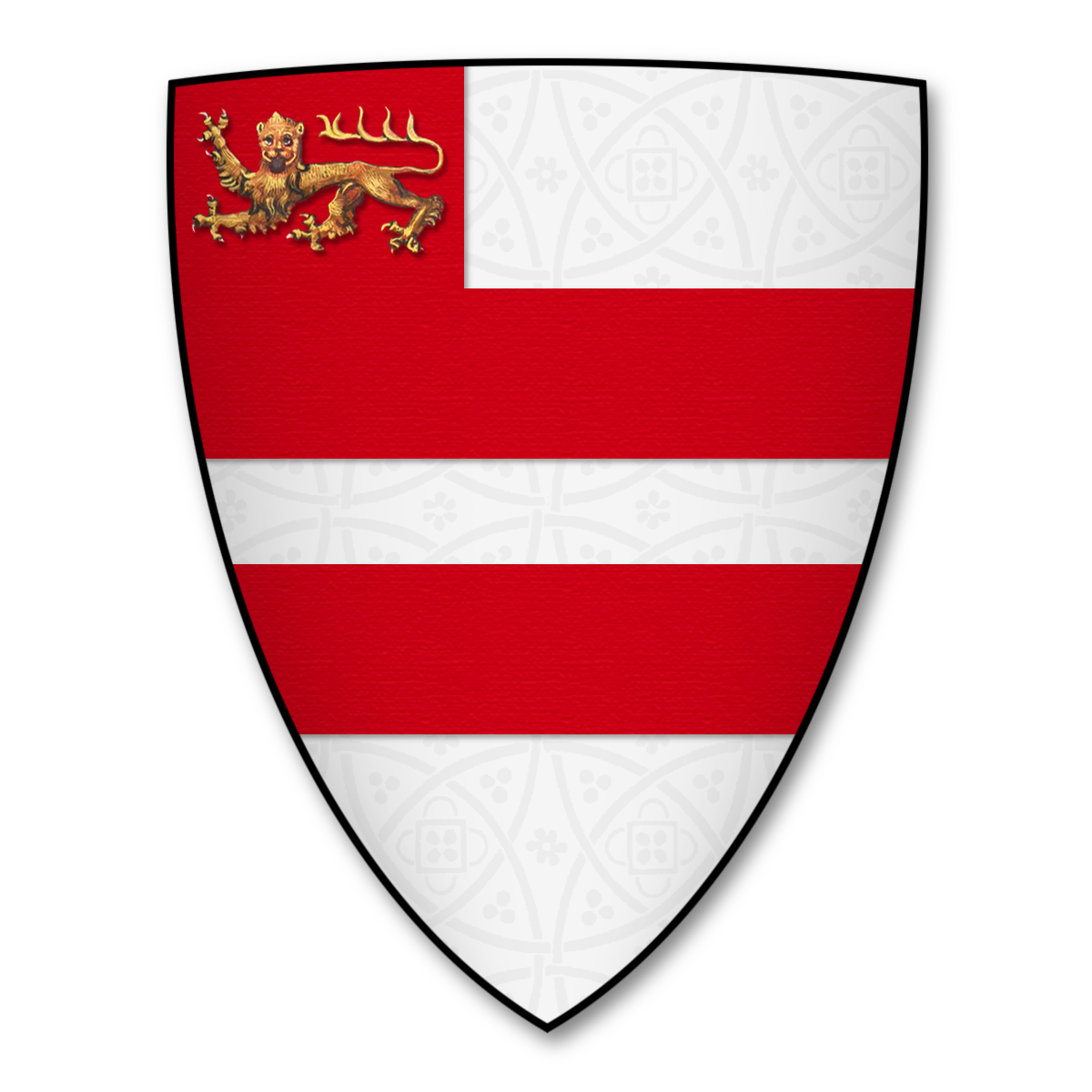
The blazonry attributed to John de Lancastre at Caerlaverock: "Argent (silver), two bars gules (red), with a canton or quarter of gules, with a lion, passant guardant (a "leopard") in it, coloured or (gold or yellow)"

In company with these people	Acompainiez à cel gent
Was Thomas de Multon,	Thomas de Koultone se fu,
Who has a banner and shield	Ky avoit baner e escu
Of silver, with three bars gules.	De argent, o treis barres de goulys.
His arms were not single	Es armes ne furent pas soules
In character and design;	D'esiente en le apparellement;
For such as resembled them had	Kar teles or resemblantment
John de Lancaster in his hands;	Johans de Langcastre entre meins,
But who, in the place of a bar less,	Mès ke en lieu de une barre meins,
Bore a red quarter with a yellow leopard.	Quartier rouge e jaune lupart.

The same heraldry appears on John's seal on the Barons' Letter to the Pope, of 1301. In several parliamentary records John de Lancastre of Grisedale is attributed with a variation of these arms where the "leopard" is replaced by a cinquefoil or five-petalled flower.

John was a parliamentary baron of England by writ. Complete Peerage explains (p. 374, with abbreviations expanded):

The King took his homage and he had livery of his paternal inheritance 18 Apr. 1291, and of the inheritance of his mother 1 Oct. 1294. He was summoned for Military Service from 16 Apr. (1291) 19 Edw. I to 23 July (1317) 11 Edw. II, to attend the King at Salisbury 26 Jan. (1296/7) 25 Edw. I, and to Parliament from 29 Dec. (1299) 28 Edw. I to 12 Dec. (1309) 3 Edw. II, by writs directed Johanni de Lancastria, whereby, according to modern doctrine, he is held to have become LORD LANCASTER.

John was also given administrative responsibilities in northwestern England.

According to the interpretation of Complete Peerage he was also the John de Lancastre who held the important position of holding the possessions of Thomas de Lancaster, the rebellious earl of Lancaster and Leicester. This Thomas was a member of the "House of Lancaster" branch of the royal family, descended from Edmund Crouchback, who was executed in 1322. Complete Peerage (p. 376):

On 15 July 1323 he was granted the keeping during pleasure of the lands of Thomas, Earl of Lancaster, and other rebels in co. Lancaster, with certain exceptions, having on 1 July 1323 given security for his own good behaviour. He appears 21 Feb. 1326/7 as keeper of the Castle and Honour of Lancaster, and on 5 Feb. 1327/8 was allowed his reasonable expenses in that he had paid to the Exchequer at various times £1,400 for the lands of Thomas, Earl of Lancaster, and others committed to him, and had taken the money to Westminster at great expense, it being guarded by footmen and horsemen.

John de Lancastre died shortly before 18 April 1334 without heir. Annora, who had received livery of his manors, died shortly before 6 October 1338.

== Sources ==
- G.E. Cockayne et al., "Lancaster (Barony)", in: Complete Peerage, 2nd ed., Vol.7, pp. 371–377.
- F.W. Ragg (1910), "De Lancaster", in: Transactions of the Cumberland and Westmorland Antiquarian and Archaeological Society, pp. 395–493. doi:10.5284/1064125pdf
- I.J. Sanders (1960) English Baronies, A Study of their Origin and Descent, pp. 56–7, & 83–85.
