= Ivo Taillebois =

Norman nobleman

Ivo Taillebois (died 1094) was a powerful Norman nobleman, sheriff and tenant-in-chief in 11th-century England.

== Life ==
Ivo Taillebois was a Norman most probably from Taillebois, now a small hamlet in Saint-Gervais de Briouze, Calvados. He sold land at Villers to the Abbey of Saint-Étienne, Caen and donated a church of Christot in Calvados. The latter diploma was attested by his brother Robert. Another brother, Ralph Taillebois, was High Sheriff of Bedfordshire and Ivo succeeded him as sheriff after Ralph's death shortly before 1086.

In 1071 King William, with Taillebois leading his army, besieged the Isle of Ely where the rebel leader Hereward the Wake was based. Hereward escaped capture during the siege but was caught and imprisoned; Taillebois dissuaded William from freeing him.

His power base appears to have been in Lincolnshire, where he probably became High Sheriff of Lincolnshire before 1068. He married Lucy, daughter of Turold, the Sheriff of Lincolnshire before the conquest, later Countess of Chester, in whose name he held the extensive honor of Bolingbroke in Lincolnshire. In the Domesday Book of 1086 he appears as a tenant-in-chief also holding Bourne and many of its manors. William Rufus further endowed him with the lands of Ribblesdale and Lonsdale in Cumbria on the border with Scotland, possibly for his service as a royal steward. He was also granted the Barony of Kendal by William Rufus, consisting of a sizable portion of Westmorland including Lowick Hall.

Ivo attested several charters for William the Conqueror before 1086, including the abbey of St. Armand and the abbey of St. Peter, Ghent, and several for William II Rufus including the abbey of St. Florent, Saumur and the abbey of St. Mary, La Sauve Majeure.

== Family ==
According to annalist Peter of Blois, Ivo's "only daughter, who had been nobly espoused, died before her father; for that evil shoots should not fix deep roots in the world, the accursed lineage of that wicked man perished by the axe of the Almighty, which cut off all his issue." Ivo's only known heiress was Beatrix. Her sons by Ribald of Middleham, used the Taillebois surname on occasion.

It is not certain whether Beatrix was a daughter of Lucy, and it is also not certain what connection Beatrix or any other relatives might have had to later Taillebois families or the family of William de Lancaster I, who was also associated with the Taillebois surname.

There has been much speculation and discussion about Lucy, and even whether she was one person. In recent times, Keats-Rohan proposed to resolve this by describing her as a daughter to a previous Anglo-Saxon sheriff of Lincolnshire, who was married to a daughter of the Norman Malet family.

Ivo's widow Lucy married Roger FitzGerold, Baron of Kendal, by whom she was the mother of William de Roumare, Earl of Lincoln. Lucy married thirdly Ranulf le Meschin, 3rd Earl of Chester, and was the mother of four children including Ranulf de Gernon, 4th Earl of Chester.
