= William de Lancaster I =

12th-century English nobleman

William de Lancaster I (d. circa 1170), or William Fitz Gilbert, was a nobleman of the 12th century in Northwest England. According to a document some generations later, he was also referred to as William de Tailboys (de Taillebois) when younger, and then became "William de Lancaster, baron of Kendal".

His lordship continued during the Anarchy, and the period during which his region was ruled by King David I of Scotland. He remained important after the return of English rule under King Henry II. His most important lordship, which had previously come together under Ivo de Taillebois, eventually came to be known as the barony of Kendal.

== Titles and positions ==
=== Earliest holdings ===
Despite his by-name "de Lancaster", which was used by his descendants as a family name, William and his relatives appear in contemporary documents relating mainly to what is now the modern county of Cumbria, not Lancashire, the county of Lancaster. He and his family were especially associated with Copeland in western Cumberland, Furness in the Lake District, the barony of Kendal, which became part of Westmorland, and various areas such as Barton between Kendal and Ullswater. Much of this area was not yet permanently part of England, or divided into counties. Only part of this area came to be within the later English county of Lancaster or Lancashire. The by-name "de Lancaster", by which William was remembered, therefore referred to the city of Lancaster, to the south of his lordships, and probably more importantly to some area under its jurisdiction which did not necessarily become part of the later county. In 1900, William Farrer claimed that "all of the southern half of Westmorland, not only the Kirkby Lonsdale Ward of Westmorland, but also the Kendal Ward, were linked with Northern Lancashire from a very early time" and formed a single district for fiscal administrative purposes.

Two apparently lost records which are said to have mentioned William's father Gilbert apparently connected him to Cumbria, specifically to the area of Furness.

The following are some of the areas associated with him:

- Muncaster in Cumberland. William Farrer, in his 1902 edition of Lancashire Pipe Rolls and early charters, wrote that it "appears that he was possessed of the lordship of Mulcaster (now Muncaster), over the Penningtons of Pennington in Furness, and under Robert de Romille, lord of Egremont and Skipton, who held it in right of his wife, Cecilia, daughter and heiress of William Meschin". According to Farrer, this title would have been one of those granted by Roger de Mowbray, son of Nigel de Albini, having come into his hands after the decease without male heirs of Ivo de Taillebois. He also believed that this grant to William de Lancaster came to be annulled.
- Workington, Lamplugh and Middleton. The manors of Workington and Lamplugh in Cumberland were given by William de Lancaster, in exchange for Middleton in Westmorland, to an apparently close relative, Gospatric, son of Orme, brother-in-law of Waldeve, Lord of Allerdale.
- Hensingham. The Register of St Bees shows that both William son of Gilbert de Lancastre, and William's son William had land in this area. William's was at a place called Swartof or Suarthow, "probably the rising ground between Whitehaven and Hensingham, known locally as Swartha Brow". The appears to have come from his father Gilbert. His brother Roger apparently held land at Walton, just outside modern Hensingham, and had a son named Robert. Roger and William also named a brother called Robert.
- Ulverston. Farrer argued that this may have been held by William and perhaps his father Gilbert, before it was granted by Stephen, Count of Boulogne and Mortain, to Furness Abbey in 1127. The possible connection of William's father Gilbert to Furness will be discussed further below.
- Ulverston. Early topographical records also traditionally attributed a 12th-century grant of the nearby manor of Lowick (historically part of the lordship of Ulverston) to William I during the reign of King Henry II. However, the Victoria County History notes that this grant to the Towers family (Robert de Turribus) was actually executed later by his son and successor, William de Lancaster II.

=== Enfeoffment by King Stephen ===
King Stephen's reign in England lasted from 1135 to 1154, but only during a small part of this did he control this region. For the majority of his reign all or most of this area was under the rule of David I of Scotland.

During the period when Stephen was in control "we possess distinct and clear evidence that Stephen, as king, enfeoffed a knight of the lands of Warton in Kentdale and the wide territory of Garstang, in Lancashire, to hold for the service of one knight. This was William de Lancaster, son of Gilbert by Godith his wife, described in the Inquest of service made in 1212 as "Willelmus filius Gilberti primus", that is, the first to be enfeoffed of that fee."

=== Enfeoffment by Roger de Mowbray ===
At a similar time, during the period 1145-1154, a major enfeoffment by Roger de Mowbray put William in control, or perhaps just confirmed his control, of what would become the barony of Kendal, plus Warton, Garstang, and Wyresdale in Lancashire, as well as Horton in Ribblesdale and "Londsdale". The latter two are sometimes apparently being interpreted as indicating possession for some time of at least part of what would become the Wapentake of Ewcross in the West Riding of Yorkshire.

=== The Scottish period ===
During the Scottish occupation, Hugh de Morville became the overlord of much of this area, a position he kept when the area later returned to English control. Farrer and Curwen remark:

William de Lancaster no longer held anything in Kentdale of Roger de Mowbray; but he appears to have held his lands in Westmarieland and Kentdale of Morevill by rendering Noutgeld of £14 6s. 3d. per annum, and some 16 carucates of land in nine vills in Kentdale as farmer under Morevill. In 1166 William de Lancaster I held only two knight's fees, of the new feoffment of Roger de Mowbray in Sedbergh, Thornton, Burton in Lonsdale, and the other places in Yorkshire previously named, which his descendants held long after of the fee of Mowbray by the same service. The Mowbray connexion with Kentdale had come to an end upon the accession of Henry II, who placed Hugh de Morevill in possession of Westmarieland in return, possibly, for past services and in pursuance of the policy of planting his favourites in regions of great strategic importance. Probably the change of paramount lord had little, if any, effect on the position of William de Lancaster in Kentdale.

In Cumberland further west, William was probably castellan in the castle of Egremont under William fitz Duncan. Such proposals are based on his transaction with his cousin Gospatrick son of Orme, whereby castle service at Egremont was due to William for Workington.

=== The barony of Kendal ===
William de Lancaster is often described as having been a baron of Kendal. In fact it is not so clear what kind of lordship existed over Kendal, given the lack of clarity of records in this period. The word baron developed specific meanings during the Middle Ages, namely feudal baron and baron by writ. William Farrer wrote, in the introduction to his Records of Kendal:

After a careful review of the evidence which has been sketched above, the author is of opinion that no barony or reputed barony of Kentdale existed prior to the grants of 1189–90; and that neither William de Lancaster, son of Gilbert, nor William de Lancaster II, his son and successor, can be rightly described as "baron" of Kentdale.

What became the barony of Kendal is nevertheless generally accepted to have started to come together already under Ivo de Taillebois (d. 1094) in the time of William Rufus, some generations before William. In later generations William was depicted by his family as having been a Taillebois. A continuity is therefore often asserted between what Ivo held, and what William later held, despite the fact that William had no known hereditary claim on Kendal, and Ivo had no male heirs. (This is also the reason for the frequent assertion that William held the entire wapentake of Ewcross, even though it seems that the family of Roger de Mowbray kept hold of at least Burton in Kendal. William held two parts of it, mentioned above, while Ivo had held another, Clapham. The rest is speculation.)

According to Farrer, the barony of Kendal became a real barony only in the time of William's grand daughter Hawise, who married Gilbert son of Roger fitz Reinfrid. Both he and his son William de Lancaster III were certainly barons of Kendal.

=== Other offices ===
- Furness and the Royal forests. According to a later grant to Gilbert Fitz Reinfrid, William must have held some position over the whole forest of Westmarieland (the Northern or Appleby barony of Westmorland), Kendal and Furness. His claims in Furness may have gone beyond just the forest, but this appears to have put him in conflict with the claims of the Furness Abbey, and this conflict continued over many generations. His family may have had links there before him. Some websites report that his father Gilbert was known as "Gilbert of Furness". (This apparently comes from a 17th-century note by Benjamin Ayloffe, mentioned below.)
- Lancaster Castle. According to Dugdale, the eminent English antiquarian, he was governor of Lancaster Castle in the reign of Henry II, about 1180. Little is known about how William came to hold the honour of Lancaster and use the surname, but it is sometimes suggested that it implies connections to royalty, perhaps coming from his apparent marriage to Gundred de Warrenne (or was this just yet another reward for some forgotten service, perhaps against the Scots?).
- Seneschal. According to a note written by the 17th century antiquarian Benjamin Ayloffe, which is reproduced in the introduction of Walford Dakin Selby's collection of Lancashire and Cheshire Records, p.xxix, William was Seneschallus Hospitii Regis, or steward of the king's household. The same note also states that William's father was the kings "Receiver for the County of Lancaster".

== Ancestry ==
William's father was named Gilbert, and his mother was Godith. They are both mentioned clearly in a benefaction of William to St Mary de Pré and William was often referred to as William the son of Gilbert (fitz Gilbert). William was also said to have descended from both Ivo de Taillebois and Eldred of Workington, who were contemporaries of William Rufus, but the exact nature of the relationship is unclear and indeed controversial.

Two late cartularies, those of Cockersand Abbey and St Mary's Abbey in Yorkshire, give a father-to-son descent from Ivo through Eldred, Ketel, and Gilbert to William. However, monastic genealogies concerning their benefactors are generally considered unreliable. There are chronological concerns with this pedigree: Ivo and Eldred appear to have been contemporaries, as were Ketel and Gilbert. Likewise, it implies that William de Lancaster was heir to Ketel fitz Eldred, but Ketel is commonly thought to have had another heir. And there is also no record of Eldred being an heir to Ivo, while it would be unusual for the descendants of a Norman noble (Ivo) to have so many Anglo-Saxon names (Eldred, Ketel, etc.).

The 12th-century annalist Peter of Blois related that Ivo's "only daughter, who had been nobly espoused, died before her father; for that evil shoots should not fix deep roots in the world, the accursed lineage of that wicked man perished by the axe of the Almighty, which cut off all his issue." The only known heiress of Ivo was a daughter named Beatrix. Her sons by her one documented husband, Ribald of Middleham, did occasionally use the Taillebois surname. A connection between William and Ivo de Taillebois is still supported based upon a similarity of land holdings between the two. Likewise, a record in the Coucher Book of Furness Abbey involving Helewise de Lancaster, William's granddaughter, claims he had been known as William de Tailboys before receiving the right to be called "Willelmum de Lancastre, Baronem de Kendale". However, Farrer and Curwen have questioned the accuracy of this account, pointing out that William was probably not baron of Kendal, but an under-lord there. There was a Tailboys family present in Westmorland during the 12th century, for example in Cliburn, and these were presumably relatives of William de Lancaster. This family used the personal name Ivo at least once, and may have been related to Ivo and Beatrix.

In a 1212 Curia Regis Roll entry, William's granddaughter Helewise de Lancaster and her husband refer to "Ketel filius Eutret" as her "antecessor", a term that could mean literal ancestor, or simply a predecessor more generally. A grant to St Leonard's York by William refers to Ketel, the son of "Elred", as his avunculus (maternal uncle). Likewise, a second charter, from 1357, repeats the claim that Ketel son of "Aldred" was avunculus of William. Gilbert was thus not son of Ketel. Noting that avunculus was sometimes used imprecisely for a paternal uncle, Frederick Ragg proposed that Gilbert was the brother of Ketel, and hence son rather than grandson of Eldred However, George Washington and George Andrews Moriarty instead viewed Ketel as maternal uncle to William, brother to Gilbert's wife Godith. Washington noted that the names Godith, Ketel and Eldred are all Anglo-Saxon names, rarely used by Normans, possibly indicative of a single family. This contrasts with the French names of Gilbert, and his son and grandsons named William. Moriarty suggested that Christina, Ketel's wife, may have been a relative of Ivo de Taillebois such as the unnamed daughter mentioned by Peter of Blois. The daughter mentioned by Peter of Blois is often considered to be the same as the one known daughter, Beatrix, the wife of Ribald of Middleham. For example, Katherine Keats-Rohan accepted Godith as Ketel's sister, but proposed their mother to be Beatrix, through a marriage to Eldred of which no contemporary record has been found.

== Descendants and relatives ==
Attributed arms of William de Lancaster I, baron of Kendal, and of several of his main line descendants: Argent, two bars gules and on a canton of the second, a lion passant guardant or

William was married to a Countess Gundred, perhaps his second wife. Because she was called a countess in contemporary records, she is sometimes identified with the widow of Roger, Earl of Warwick, who was daughter of William de Warenne, 2nd Earl of Surrey and Elizabeth of Vermandois, but William Farrer instead believed she must be a daughter of Roger, with the same name as her mother.

William had issue:

- Avicia, who married Richard de Morville, constable of Scotland (possibly as widow of William Peverel the Younger, although Complete Peerage proposed this William's wife was a daughter of Roger the Poitevin, lord of Lancaster itself)
- William (II), William's heir, whose own legitimate heir Helewise de Lancaster married Gilbert son of Roger Fitz Reinfrid.
- Jordan, mentioned in a benefaction to St Mary de Pré in Leicester, he died young.
- Agnes, who married Alexander de Windsore
- Sigrid, married to William the clerk of Garstang.

William's granddaughter Helewise had a son and heir who took her surname, William de Lancaster III. He died without male heirs, heavily indebted, apparently due to payments demanded after he was captured at Rochester during the First Barons' War.
