= John Dunning (businessman) =

British businessman

John Carter Dunning CBE (born 1934) is a British businessman and the founder of Westmorland Motorway Services, which runs motorway service stations in England and Scotland and is best known for Tebay Services.

== Career ==
Dunning began his career in farming in 1956. The 900-acre Cumbrian hill farm was focused on sheep cattle.

Dunning started Tebay Services on his family farm in 1972.

== Personal life ==
He is married to Barbara. Their daughter Sarah left a City career to become actively involved in the business, and is chair and a co-owner of Westmorland. Their other daughter, Jane Lane, runs the farm.

== Honors and awards ==
In the 1992 Birthday Honours he was made a Commander of the Order of the British Empire, "For public service in Cumbria."
