= William de Roumare, Earl of Lincoln =

Norman noble (born c. 1096)

- Earl of Lincoln
- Tenure: after 1143 – before c. 1149
- Predecessor: Roger FitzGerold de Roumare (as Baron of Kendal)
- Other titles: Baron of Kendal
- Spouse: Hawise de Reviers
- Issue: William de Roumare
- Father: Roger FitzGerold de Roumare
- Mother: Lucy of Bolingbroke

William de Romare (born c. 1096) (also Roumare or Romayre or Romay) was the Earl of Lincoln, 2nd Baron of Kendal, Lord of Bolingbroke.

He was the son of Roger FitzGerold (de Roumare), 1st Baron of Kendal, Lord of Bolingbroke and Lucy of Bolingbroke, widow of Ivo de Taillebois. He followed his father as Lord of Bolingbroke, Lincolnshire. He was half-brother to Ranulf of Chester, through their mother, Lucy.

In Normandy, he was Seigneur (Lord) of Roumare.

In 1120 William was supposed to have crossed the Channel with William the Aetheling in the White Ship but disembarked shortly before it sailed, avoiding drowning in the subsequent sinking of the ship.

He was created Earl of Lincoln by King Stephen after 1143. The Earl lived at both Bolingbroke and Lincoln Castle.

He was the ducal constable of the fortress of Neufmarche, stoutly resisting Hugh de Gournay, then in rebellion, in 1118 in Normandy.

== Family and children ==
He married Hawise de Reviers, sister of Baldwin de Redvers, 1st Earl of Devon (Reviers) and had one known child:

- William (Helie) de Roumare, married Agnes de Aumale. They had a son William de Roumare who married twice and died without issue.
