= Lucy of Bolingbroke =

Anglo-Norman heiress

- Born: 23 May 1074; Spalding, Lincolnshire, England
- Died: 1136 (aged 61–62); Chester, Cheshire, England
- Other name: Lucia
- Title: Countess-consort of Chester
- Term: 1120–1129
- Spouses: 1) Ivo Taillebois; 2) Roger fitz Gerold [de Roumare]; 3) Ranulf le Meschin
- Children: William de Roumare, Ranulf de Gernon, Alicia

Lucy of Bolingbroke or Lucia Thoroldsdottir of Lincoln (died circa 1136) was an Anglo-Norman heiress in central England and, later in life, countess of Chester. Probably related to the old English earls of Mercia, she came to possess extensive lands in Lincolnshire which she passed on to her husbands and sons. She was a notable religious patron, founding or co-founding two small religious houses and endowing several with lands and churches.

== Ancestry ==
A charter of Crowland Abbey, now thought to be spurious, described Thorold of Bucknall, perhaps the same as her probable father Thorold of Lincoln, as a brother of Godgifu (better known as Lady Godiva), wife of Leofric, Earl of Mercia. The same charter contradicted itself on the matter, proceeding to style Godgifu's son (by Leofric), Ælfgar, as Thorold's cognatus (cousin). Another later source, from Coventry Abbey, made Lucy the sister of Earls Edwin and Morcar, Ælfgār's sons, while two other unreliable sources, the Chronicle of Abbot Ingmund of Crowland and the Peterborough Chronicle also make Lucy the daughter of Earl Ælfgar. Keats-Rohan's explanation for these accounts is that they were ill-informed and were confusing Lucy with her ancestor, William Malet's mother, who was in some manner related to the family of Godgifu.

Although there is much confusion about Lucy's ancestry in earlier writings, recent historians tend to believe that she was the daughter of Thorold, sheriff of Lincoln, by a daughter of William Malet (died 1071). She inherited a huge group of estates centred on Spalding in Lincolnshire, probably inherited from both the Lincoln and the Malet families. This group of estates have come to be called the "Honour of Bolingbroke".

== Marriages ==
The heiress Lucy had three husbands, all of whom died during her lifetime. The first of these was to Ivo Taillebois, a marriage which took place "around 1088". Ivo took over her lands as husband, and seems in addition to have been granted estates and extensive authority in Westmorland and Cumberland. Ivo died in 1094. Ivo Taillebois (probably brother of Ralph Taillebois, a sheriff of Bedfordshire who was dead by 1086), was a prominent administrator throughout the reign of William I and well into that of William II. He appears to have been twice married since he was ancestor of the English family surnamed 'of Lancaster' or Taillebois who descended from the thegn Eldred, alive in 1086. In 1093 he can be seen to have had a daughter Beatrice, then married to Ribald of Richmond who was the illegitimate son of Odo, Count of Penthièvre. She was dead in 1121, when Ivo's widow Lucy was married to her third husband. Lucy and Beatrice, probably widow of Eldred before marriage to Ribald, were contemporaries, so Lucy must have been Ivo's second wife. She was the daughter of Ivo's predecessor as sheriff of Lincoln, Turold, who was probably a Norman. Her mother undoubtedly had English ancestry since she was the daughter of William Malet, a sheriff of York who seems to have had English maternal antecedents.

The second marriage was to one Roger de Roumare or Roger fitz Gerold, with whom Lucy had one son, William de Roumare (future Earl of Lincoln), who inherited some of her land. The latter was the ancestor of the de Roumare family of Westmorland. Roger died in either 1097 or 1098.

Sometime after this, though before 1101, she was married to Ranulf le Meschin, her last and longest marriage. A son Ranulf de Gernon, succeeded his father to the earldom of Chester (which Ranulf acquired in 1121) and a daughter, Alice, married Richard de Clare.

Upon Lucy's death, most of the Lincolnshire lands she inherited passed to her older son William de Roumare, while the rest passed to Ranulf II of Chester (forty versus twenty knights' fees). The 1130 pipe roll informs us that Lucy had paid King Henry I 500 marks after her last husband's death for the right not to have to remarry. She died around 1138.

== Religious patronage ==
Lucy, as widowed countess, founded the convent of Stixwould in 1135, becoming, in the words of one historian, "one of the few aristocratic women of the late eleventh and twelfth centuries to achieve the role of independent lay founder".

Lucy's religious patronage however, centred on Spalding Priory, a religious house for which her own family was the primary patron. This house (a monastic cell of Crowland) was founded, or re-founded, in 1085 by Lucy and her first husband Ivo Taillebois. Later, she was responsible for many endowments, for instance in the 1120s she and her third husband Earl Ranulf granted the priory the churches of Minting, Belchford and Scamblesby, all in Lincolnshire. In 1135, Lucy, now widowed for the last time, granted the priory her own manor of Spalding for the permanent use of the monks. The records indicate that Lucy went to great effort to ensure that, after her own death, her sons would honour and uphold her gifts.
