= Duke of Kendal =

Title of the English nobility

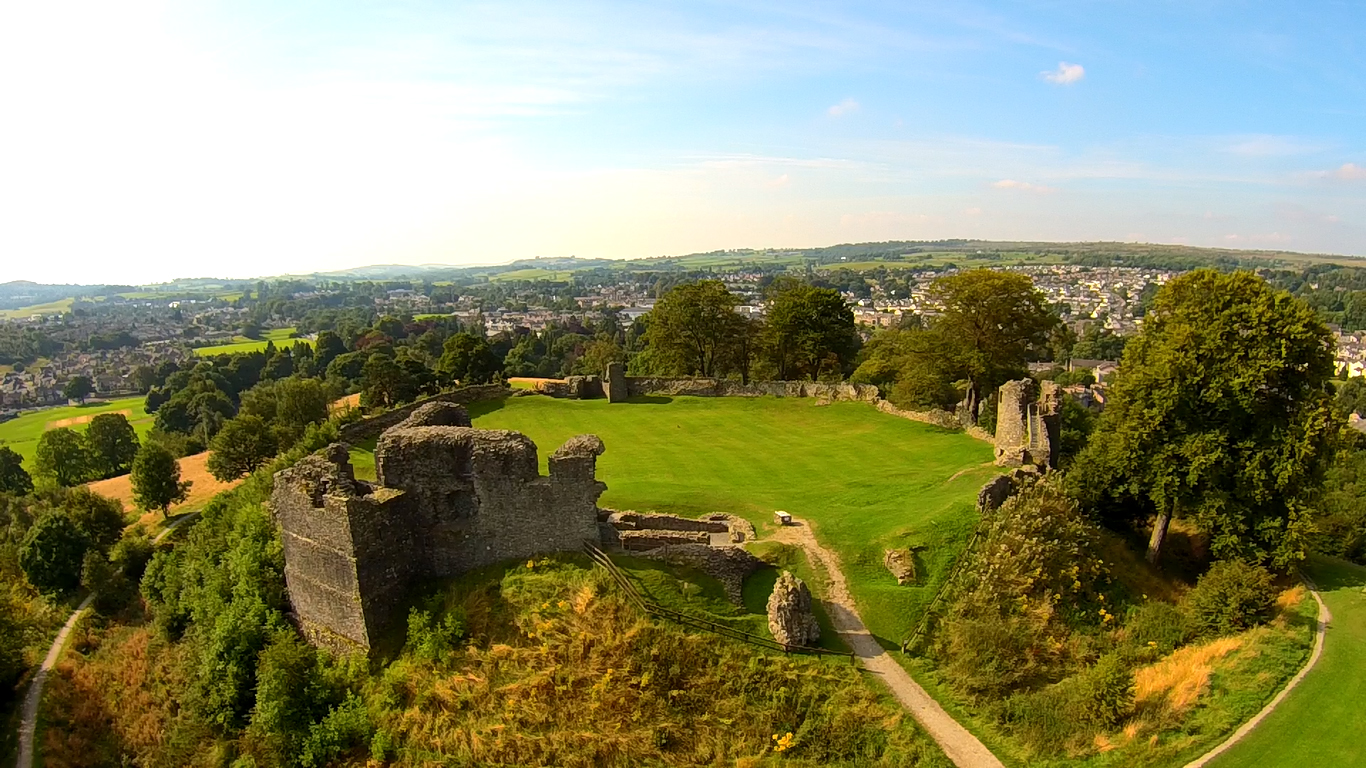
Ruins of Kendal Castle, with the town of Kendal behind.

The titles of Earl of Kendal and Duke of Kendal have been created several times, generally for people with a connection to the English/British royal family. The title refers to Kendal Castle in Cumbria.

- The first creation was for John, 4th son of King Henry IV, who was created Earl of Kendal, Earl of Richmond and Duke of Bedford in 1414. The titles became extinct at his death.
- The second creation was for John Beaufort, 3rd Earl of Somerset, a grandson of John of Gaunt, who was created Earl of Kendal and Duke of Somerset in 1443. He died the following year, and the titles became extinct.
- The third creation was for Jean de Foix, vicomte de Castillon, who was created Earl of Kendal in 1446. He gave allegiance to the King of France in 1462, and is thereby presumed to have forfeited his English peerage. However, his descendants in France (and, later, in Spain) continued to use the title under the name 'Candale' (or 'Candal').
- The next Kendal creation was for Prince Rupert of the Rhine, nephew of King Charles I and a Royalist commander in the Civil War, who is sometimes (perhaps erroneously) said to have been created Baron Kendal along with the other titles of Earl of Holdernesse and Duke of Cumberland in 1644. This Kendal title, if it ever existed, became extinct on his death without legitimate issue.
- The first use of Kendal as a ducal title was in 1666, when Charles Stuart, son of the Duke of York, was given the titles of Duke of Kendal, Earl of Wigmore and Baron Holdenby. He died the following year, and these titles became extinct.
- The next creation was for Prince George of Denmark, the husband of Princess (later Queen) Anne, who was created Duke of Cumberland, Earl of Kendal and Baron Wokingham in 1689. He died without surviving issue, and the titles became extinct.
- The next creation was for Ehrengard von der Schulenberg, Duchess of Munster, the mistress of King George I, who was created Duchess of Kendal, Countess of Feversham and Baroness Glastonbury in 1719. These titles were for life only and expired with their first holder.
- The last Kendal creation was for James Lowther, who was created Baron Kendal, Baron Burgh, Baron Lowther, Viscount Lowther, Viscount Lonsdale and Earl of Lonsdale in 1784. These titles became extinct at his death.
- In 1816, at the time of the marriage of Princess Charlotte of Wales (daughter of the Prince Regent) to Prince Leopold of Saxe-Coburg, it was announced that the groom was to be created Duke of Kendal. However, in the end this never happened.

== Earls of Kendal, First Creation (1414) ==
- John of Lancaster, 1st Earl of Kendal and Duke of Bedford (1389–1435)

== Earls of Kendal, Second Creation (1443) ==
- John Beaufort, 1st Earl of Kendal and Duke of Somerset (1404–1444)

== Earls of Kendal, Third Creation (1446) ==
- John de Foix, 1st Earl of Kendal (d. 1485) (presumed to have surrendered the peerage 1462, though his descendants in France continued to use the title under the name 'Candale')
- Gaston II de Foix, 2nd comte de Candale (d. 1500)
- Gaston III de Foix, 3rd comte de Candale (d. 1536)
- Frédéric de Foix, 4th comte de Candale (d. 1571)
- Henri de Foix, 5th comte de Candale (d. 1572)
- Marguerite de Foix, 6th comtesse de Candale (1567–1593), married in 1587 Jean Louis de Nogaret de La Valette, 1st duc d'Epernon (1554–1642)
- Henri de Nogaret de La Valette, 7th comte de Candale (d. 1639) (created duc de Candale in 1621, that title extinct on his death)
- Bernard de Nogaret de La Valette d'Épernon, 8th comte de Candale, 2nd duc d'Epernon (1592–1661) (created duc de La Valette in 1622)
- Louis Charles Gaston de Nogaret de La Valette, styled comte de Candale (1627–1658) was ceded his father's dukedom of La Valette in 1649, and was then known as duc de Candale

A cadet branch of the Foix-Candale family, descendant of Jean de Foix-Candale, settled in Spain (dropping the 'de Foix') and later moved to Southern Italy, following Charles III of Spain in the 1734 conquest of the Kingdom of the Two Sicilies, during the War of the Polish Succession:

Spain

- Don Antonio de Candal
- Don Pablo de Candal
- Don Domingo de Candal (b. 1698)

Italy

- Don Agostino de Candal (b. 1759)
- Donna Anna de Candal (b. 1787), m. Don Ferdinando Della Rocca (1783–1847?), Patrizio di Lucera
- Count Agostino Della Rocca de Candal (1808–1887), Patrizio di Lucera
- Count Gino Della Rocca de Candal (1848–1939), Patrizio di Lucera
- Count Carlo Della Rocca de Candal (1891–1980), Patrizio di Lucera, Order of Merit for Labour
- Count Giovanni Della Rocca de Candal (1942-), Patrizio di Lucera
- Count Geri Della Rocca de Candal (1983-), Patrizio di Lucera

== Barons Kendal, First Creation (1644) ==
(possible creation)

- Rupert of the Rhine, 1st Baron Kendal and Duke of Cumberland (1619–1682)

== Dukes of Kendal, First Creation (1666) ==
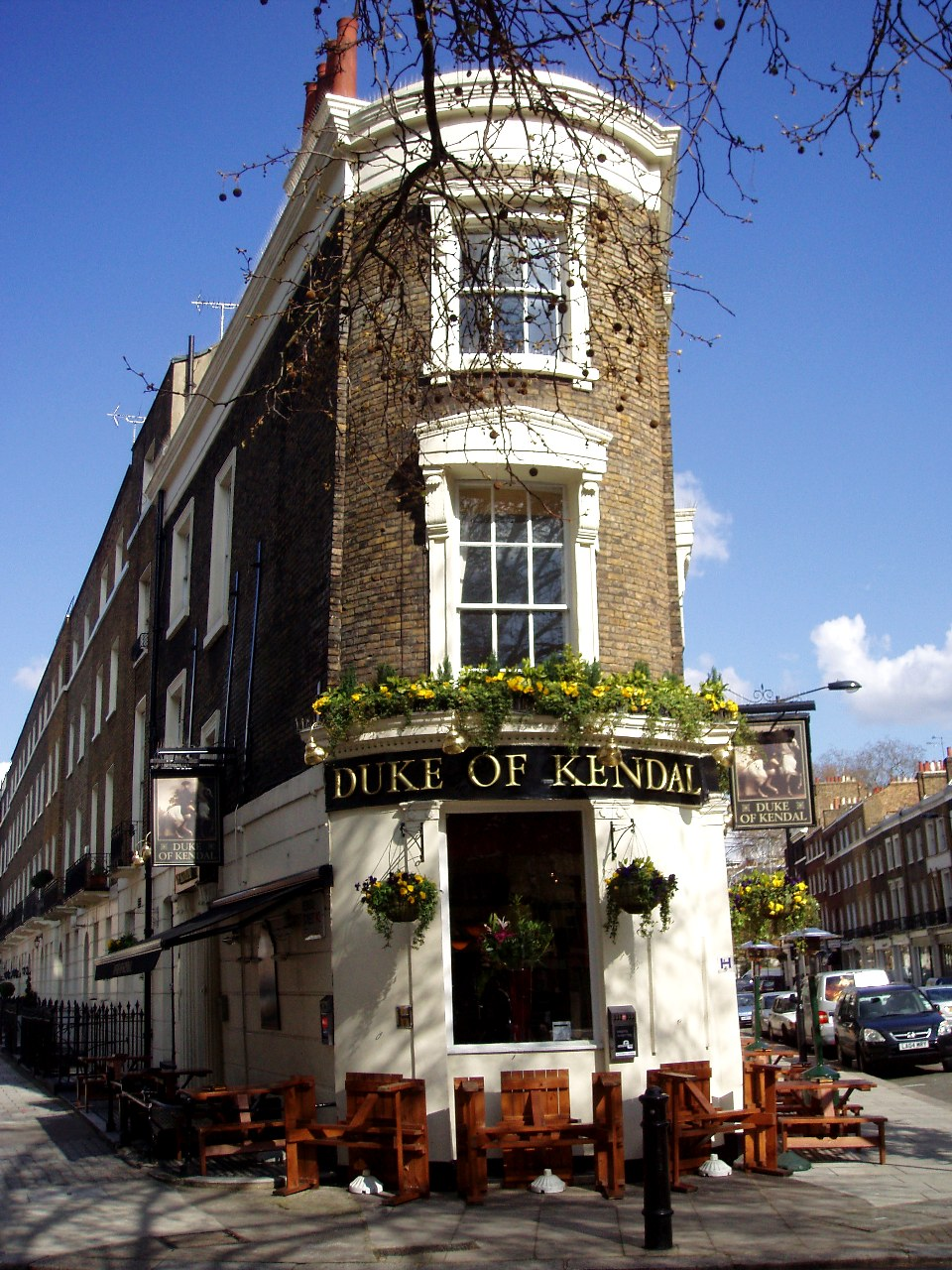
The Duke of Kendal pub in Paddington; it takes its name from Charles Stuart, Duke of Kendal.

- Charles Stuart, Duke of Kendal (1666–1667)

== Earls of Kendal, Fourth Creation (1689) ==
- George of Denmark, 1st Earl of Kendal and Duke of Cumberland (1653–1708)

== Duchess of Kendal, Second Creation (1719) ==
- Ehrengard Melusine von der Schulenburg, Duchess of Kendal and Munster (1667–1743)

== Barons Kendal, Second Creation (1784) ==
- James Lowther, 1st Baron Kendal and Earl of Lonsdale (1726–1802)

== See also ==
- Barony of Kendal
- William de Lancaster, Baron of Kendal, died c. 1170
- Wavell Wakefield, 1st Baron Wakefield of Kendal, 1898–1983

Sources include:

- Kendal/Candale (Re: Who is heir to the Earldom of Lancaster?), François R. Velde, alt.talk.royalty newsgroup, 16th Oct 2001
- Leopold's title of duke of Kendal, François R. Velde, alt.talk.royalty newsgroup, 18th Oct 2001
- Hereditary Titles
