= Stixwould Priory =

Priory in Lincolnshire, England

Coordinates: 53°10′43.29″N 0°14′50.21″W

Stixwould Priory was a priory in Lincolnshire, England, a Cistercian nunnery founded by Lucy, countess of Chester, between 1129 and 1135. The Mappa Mundi describes it as Gilbertine, but modern authors regard it as Premonstratensian. Originally suppressed in 1536, Benedictine nuns from Stainfield were then moved in by the King. In 1537 the nunnery was refounded for Premonstratensian canonesses, before being finally suppressed in 1539. It was one of nine such houses within the historical county.

Part of the porter's lodge still remains and forms part of a modern farm-house, in the modern parish of Stixwould and Woodhall.

== Priors of Stixwould ==
- Hugh, occurs 1202 and 1205
- Geoffrey, occurs 1227 and 1228
- Gilbert of Eton, occurs 1308

== Prioresses of Stixwould ==
- Margaret Gobaud, elected 1274
- Eva, died 1304
- Isabel de Dugby, elected 1304, occurs 1317
- Elizabeth, occurs 1327 and 1328
- Elizabeth de Swylington, elected 1346
- Isabel Mallet, died 1376
- Eustace Ravenser, occurs 1393, died 1403
- Katharine Roose, elected 1403
- Eleanor Welby, occurs 1440
- Helen Key, before 1536
- Mary Missenden, last prioress, appointed 1537

== Sources ==
- Knowles, David; Hadcock, R Neville (1953). Medieval religious houses : England and Wales. pp. 176, 219, 225, 231.
- Berman, Constance Hoffman (2018). The White Nuns: Cistercian Abbeys for Women in Medieval France. University of Pennsylvania Press.
