= Gilbert fitz Roger fitz Reinfried =

Anglo-Norman feudal baron

Gilbert fitz Roger fitz Reinfried, or Gilbert the son of Roger fitzReinfrid, (died about 1220) was an Anglo-Norman feudal baron whose administrative career in England began in the time of Henry II (1154–1189), for whom his father Roger fitzReinfrid had been steward. Gilbert's career continued during the reigns of Richard I, King John, and Henry III.

The coat of arms of Gilbert fitz Roger fitz Reinfrid, as they appear at Lancaster castle. These are identical to those of his father-in-law's family, the de Lancastre family of Westmorland, and identical arms were also carried by his two sons, and at least one grandson, all of whom used the surname "de Lancaster" also.

== Early career ==
Henry II married Gilbert to Hawise, the heiress of the de Lancastre family of Cumbria, granddaughter of William de Lancaster I, who had first been in the wardship of the famous knight, William Marshal, 1st Earl of Pembroke. Her family's title to Kendal passed to Gilbert's control, and it was the Lancaster surname which was passed on to his children.

It appears to be during Gilbert's time that the Barony of Kendal was brought into existence by King Richard as a truly independent district directly answerable to the King, rather than to the lord of North Westmorland (in other words what would become a few years later the Barony of Westmorland, which together with the Barony of Kendal forms the later county of Westmorland). Gilbert's personal barony not only included the administrative "Barony of Kendale" as it was much later defined, but also at least the main parts of the North Westmorland parishes of Barton and Morland. He was given control of the royal forest of not only "Kentdale" but also Furness and North Westmorland, in the same way, says the charter, as William de Lancaster I had control. Gilbert's Lancaster rights in Furness were however subject to dispute versus the powerful Abbey of Furness.

== Barons' war ==
In 1216, as a result of his role in the First Barons' War, Gilbert was captured and his son and some of his knights were held in custody until hostage were found from the Cumbrian land-owning class, and Gilbert was forced to agree to large retribution payments. He failed to pay these off during his lifetime, passing them on to the same son and heir, William, and then after his death, to the husbands of his daughters.

Gilbert Fitz Reimfrid delivered up to the king his castles of Morhulland Kirkeby, at Berewic, on 22nd January, on which occasion he made fine with the king by 12,000 marks for his goodwill and grace and the remission of his rancour against Gilbert for confederacy with the king's enemies, the barons, and that his son, William de Lancastre, and his knights, Ralph de Aencurt and Lambert de Busay, might be delivered from prison, having been taken in Rochester castle inmunition against the king; for his and his son's faithful service he was required to find hostages, namely Benedict son and heir of Henry Redeman, the first-born son of Roger de Kirkeby, whom he has of the said Gilbert's daughter, the son and heir of William de Windlesores whom he has of the niece of the said Gilbert, the son or daughter and heir of Ralph de Aencurt, the son or daughter and heir of Roger de Burton, the daughter and heir of Adam de Yeland, the son or daughter of Thomas de Bethum, the son or daughter and heir of Walter de Stirkeland, the daughter of Richard de Copland, the son of Gilbert de Lancastre, or other children in their places.

== Legacy ==
Gilbert died in about 1220, and was survived by his only legitimate son and heir William de Lancastre III, who married Agnes de Brus, but had no children, and also by three legitimate daughters, and one bastard son, Roger de Lancastre, who was given lordship under the king of Rydal as well as possession, under his brother and his heirs, of many other lands in Cumbria.

Roger became keeper of the King's forests in northern England. After the death of William de Lancaster III, the Barony of Kendal was split into different parts, in the possession of the husbands of his sisters. These were:

- Helwise de Lancaster, who married Peter de Brus II. They were the ancestors of the possessors of the Marquis Fee, part of the Barony of Kendal, long possessed by the de Ros family, and then by the Parr family. Another branch of their descendants held the so-called Lumley fee, which evolved from the Kendale holdings of their de Thweng descendants.
- Alice de Lancaster, who married William de Lyndesey and was ancestor to the possessors of the Richmond Fee, part of the Barony of Kendal.
- Serota de Lancaster, who married Alan de Multon, but had no heirs.

Roger de Lancaster of Rydal, illegitimate son of Gilbert fitz Reinfrid, had sons, but his heir, the knight Sir John de Lancaster of Grisedale, left no heir. Roger and John used not only the Lancaster surname, but also the same coat of arms which Gilbert fitz Reinfrid's grandfather-in-law William de Lancaster I had used, despite the fact that Helewise de Lancaster was not Roger's mother.
