= Lowick Hall =

Grade II* listed manor house in Cumbria, England

- Interactive map of the Lowick Hall area

General information
- Architectural style: Georgian with medieval pele tower elements
- Location: Lowick, Cumbria, England, United Kingdom
- Coordinates: 54°15′51″N 3°05′52″W
- Estimated completion: c. 1091 (medieval roots); late 16th century / c. 1740s remodelling

Listed Building – Grade II*
- Official name: Lowick Hall
- Designated: 25 March 1970
- Reference no.: 1086795

Lowick Hall is a Grade II* listed building historic country house and manor house in the parish of Lowick, near Ulverston, Cumbria, England. The estate is historically notable for an 850-year continuous manorial descent, remaining primarily in the hands of interconnected familial lines from the late 11th century until the mid-20th century. Structurally, the property records the evolution from a fortified medieval pele tower to a classical Georgian country residence.

== History ==
=== Medieval and Manorial Origins ===
The Manor of Lowick was established around 1091 under the Norman baron Ivo de Taillebois, a close contemporary of King William Rufus. During the reign of Henry II, the estate was formally granted to Robert de Turribus. To safeguard the local inhabitants and livestock from violent Scottish border raids, a stone pele tower was constructed on the site during the Middle Ages.

Through marriage, the estate passed to the Ambrose family, who served as Lords of the Manor from the late medieval period until 1684.

=== Georgian Remodelling and Familial Descent ===
Following the Ambrose tenure, the estate moved sequentially through several related genealogical branches, including the Latus and Blencowe families. Following a severe fire, the property underwent a major architectural transformation in the 18th century (c. 1740s), during which a classical Georgian main block was constructed. This reconstruction heavily integrated the remaining structures and thick walls of the late-16th-century fortification into its footprint. The design was later celebrated in an 18th-century poem by George Blencowe, which described the house as "neat, though not sumptuous".

The estate subsequently passed via continuous descent to the Everard, Montagu, and Calvert families. This lineage included Robert Thomas Christopher Calvert (R.T.C. Calvert), who linked the estate's lineage to extensive familial holdings elsewhere, including Bolwick Hall in Norfolk, Eton Wharf, and the interconnected Warner and Clogstoun families. Because the property passed strictly through direct or female-line inheritance for centuries, the legal title to the historic Lordship of the Manor of Lowick remained explicitly tied to the physical ownership of the property deeds rather than being severed from the estate.

=== 20th Century to Present ===
In 1948, the estate was sold on the open market for the first time since its 11th-century founding, breaking the long lineage of inherited descent. It was purchased by the celebrated children's author and journalist Arthur Ransome and his wife, Evgenia Shelepina (the former secretary to Leon Trotsky). Ransome lived and worked at Lowick Hall, and his proximity to Coniston Water and Peel Island further anchored his local literary connections to his famous Swallows and Amazons series.

The house was designated as a Grade II* listed building on 25 March 1970, legally recognizing its architectural and historic significance. In 2022, the estate and its accompanying 25 acres of historical grounds were put up for public sale for £2 million.

== Architecture ==
The primary structure features a mid-18th-century Georgian front block with roughcast stone walls, dressed stone dressings, a slate roof, and multi-pane sash windows. The building's interior showcases a complex blend of eras: the south wing retains medieval stop-chamfered beams, a priest hole, and an early spiral staircase constructed of massive oak baulks dating to c. 1580. The main house features classical 18th-century details, including a dog-leg staircase with column-and-vase balusters, eared architraves, and a historical built-in cupboard featuring glazed doors, a swan-neck pediment, and the heraldic Everard Crest.
