= Westmorland Motorway Services =

British hospitality company

Westmorland Motorway Services Limited
- Type: Private
- Industry: Hospitality
- Founded: 1972
- Headquarters: Westmorland Family Office, Rheged, Redhills, Penrith, Cumbria, UK
- Area served: United Kingdom (except Northern Ireland and Wales)
- Key people: Sarah Dunning (Chairman); Nabil Subuh (CEO)
- Number of employees: 500+
- Parent: Chapel Beck Ltd
- Subsidiaries: Westmorland Ltd; Cairn Lodge Services Ltd; Gloucestershire Gateway Ltd; Tatton Services Ltd
- Website: westmorlandfamily.com

Westmorland's motorway service areas

Westmorland Motorway Services Limited is the British holding company that owns Westmorland Limited who run three motorway service stations plus a truckstop and a combined service and visitor/exhibition centre.

The company is marketed as "The Westmorland Family" and its head office was formerly located at the northbound Tebay services but is now at Rheged Services and Visitor Centre in Cumbria.

The company was formed in 1972 to operate the northbound Tebay West services on the M6. Originally the company was a partnership between the Dunning and Birkett families though the Dunnings later bought out the other shareholders.

== Locations ==
Picture	Name	Opening date(s)	Road	County	Notes
	Gloucester Services	North – 7 May 2014; South – 19 May 2015	M5	Gloucestershire	
	Tebay Services	1972	M6	Cumbria	
	Tatton Services	Late 2027 / Early 2028	M56 J7 & J8	Cheshire	Future site; planning approved in October 2023
	Cairn Lodge	1994	M74 J11	Lanarkshire	Acquired by Westmorland in 2014
	Tebay Truckstop J38	11 June 1986	M6 J38	Cumbria	
	Rheged	2000	A66, A592 roundabout	Cumbria	Meeting venue, shop, cinema, art centre, fuel station
