= Gloucester Services =

Motorway service areas in Gloucestershire, England

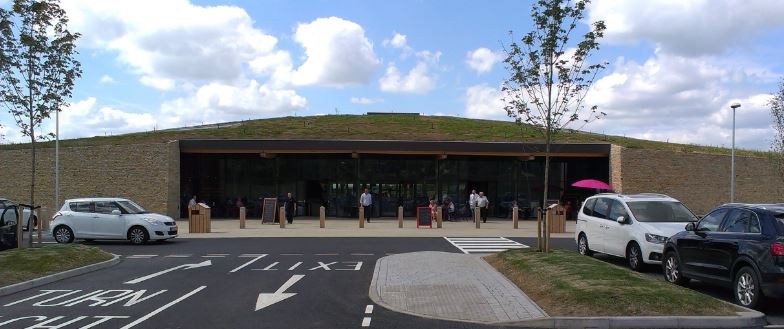

- Location within Gloucestershire

Information
- County: Gloucestershire
- Road: M5 motorway
- Coordinates: 51.818°N 2.225°W
- Operator: Westmorland Ltd
- Date opened: 7 May 2014 (northbound); 19 May 2015 (southbound)
- Fuel: Esso
- Website: www.gloucesterservices.com

Gloucester Services are a pair of motorway service areas (MSA) serving the northbound and southbound carriageways of the M5 between junction 11A and junction 12, near Whaddon, Gloucestershire, England. It specialises in selling artisanal food, and does not offer outlets for popular chain food brands. Fuel is provided by Esso and electric vehicle charging facilities are available.

Construction of the northbound services began in early 2013, and they officially opened on 7 May 2014. Construction of the southbound services commenced in March 2014 and they opened on 19 May 2015.

== History ==
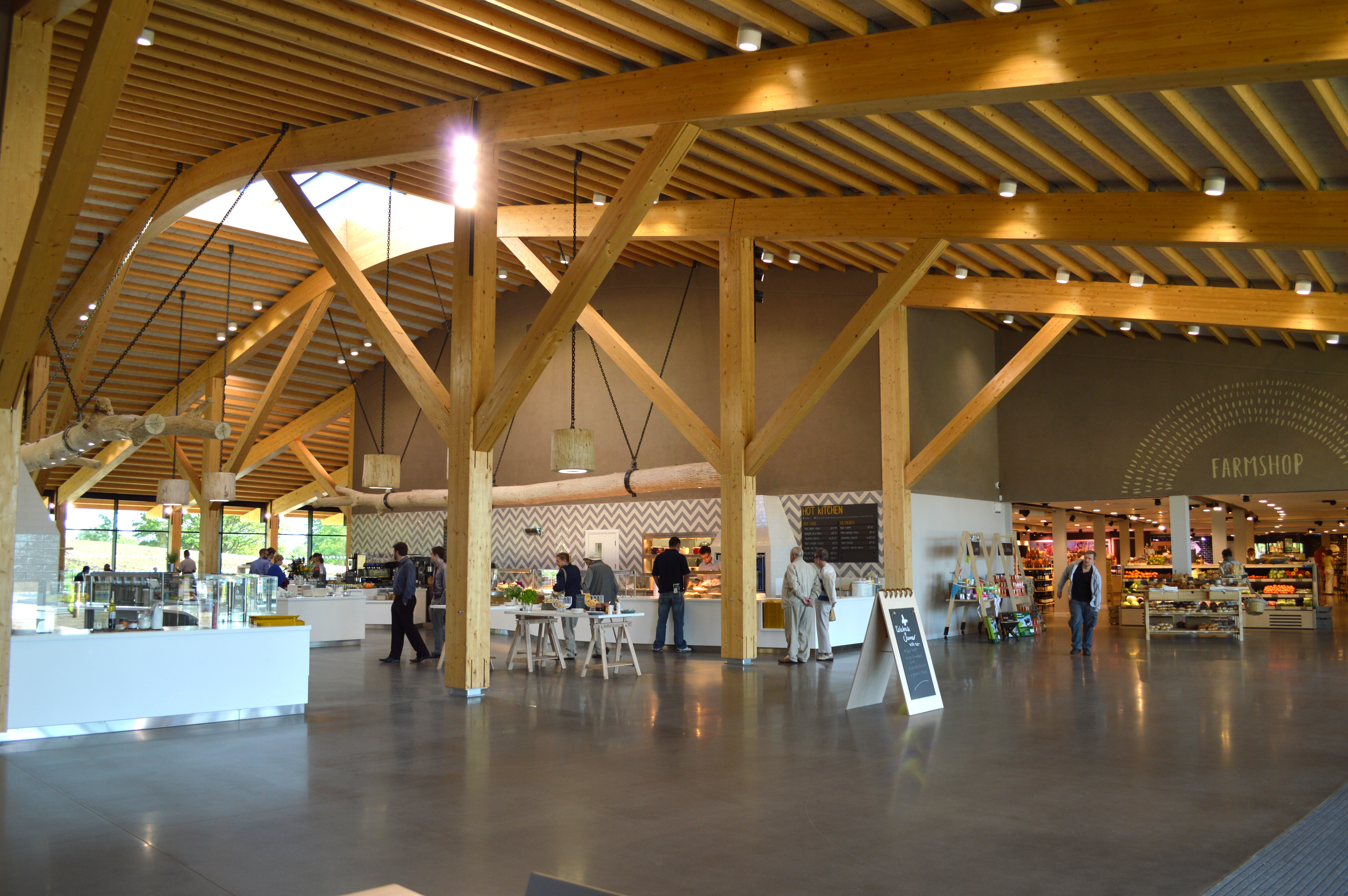
Interior of the southbound building

In September 2009, the independent motorway services operator Westmorland Motorway Services, jointly with a local charitable trust, Gloucestershire Gateway Trust, submitted plans for a service area at Matson for public consultation. The plans were for a business operated in a similar manner to Tebay Services on the M6 in Cumbria, with much of the food and produce on sale being sourced from local suppliers.

The operator promised not to host chain coffee shops, fast-food outlets, or video and gambling machines.

The service area supports the Gloucestershire Gateway Trust in assisting the business to provide good jobs for more deprived areas of Gloucester, and to support local social regeneration schemes.

The 2019 Motorway Services User Survey found that Gloucester's southbound side was in the top five motorway services in the UK for customer satisfaction.

== Government MSA strategy ==
Arguments both in support of and opposition to the scheme were made, citing Highways Agency and Department for Transport guidance.

A 2008 DfT circular advised a maximum 28-mile (45 km) distance or 30-minute drive time, whichever is the lesser, between services on the motorway network. In early 2009, the Highways Agency conducted a review of motorway services in England, guided by this circular, identifying gaps in provision of core motorway service areas. A shortcoming of provision for traffic traversing the Welsh-English border between the M50 terminus and Michaelwood Services was identified.

A distance of 40 miles (64 km) or greater would be a gap between MSAs above which the Highways Agency would consider informing a local authority of the potential need for a new MSA to be included in the Local Development Framework.

The 2008 circular also advised that any development be limited to mitigate the impact on the environment, particularly to national parks and Areas of Outstanding Natural Beauty (AONB). The site at Ongers Farm is on the boundary of the Cotswolds AONB.

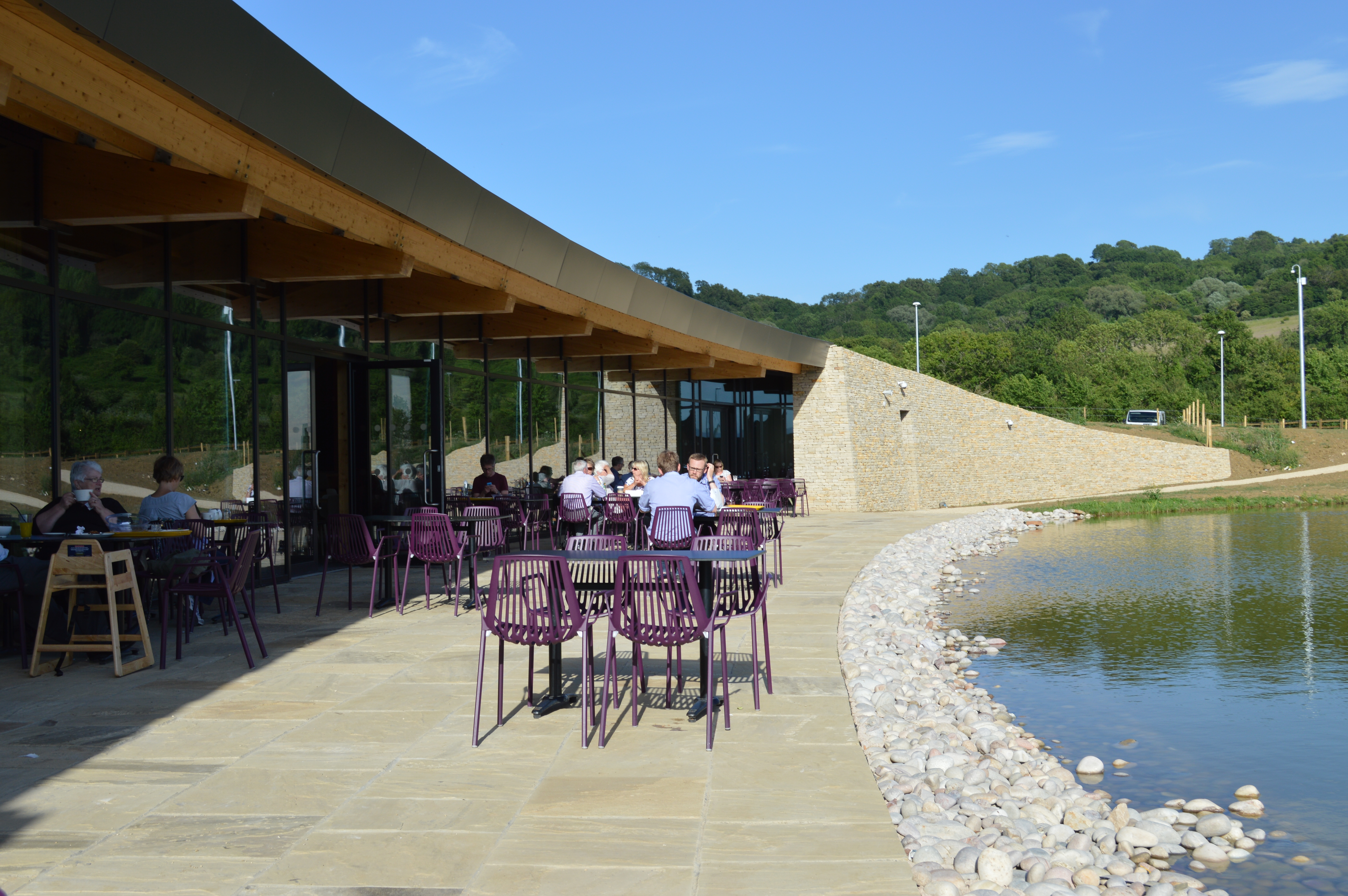
Southbound pond seating area

== Planning decision ==
A planning application was submitted to the local planning authority, Stroud District Council in December 2009. The application was approved in August 2010, with councillors on the planning committee voting six to four in favour of the scheme.

There was opposition to the proposal from groups in the local area, including the Campaign Against Motorway Service Area (CAMSA), with objections mainly based on aesthetic damage to the surrounding countryside (with particular reference to the scheme's proximity to the Cotswolds AONB), and a lack of need.

The district council was informed at the end of February 2011 that Roadchef and Welcome Break (the operators of Strensham and Michaelwood service stations) had applied to the High Court for a judicial review of the council’s decision to grant planning permission. Joined in the action were CAMSA and the parish councils of Brookthorpe-with-Whaddon and Harescombe. The case was heard in the High Court in Birmingham on 17 and 18 January 2012. By 8 February 2012, the High Court had dismissed all challenges to the planning application.

== Green roof ==
One of the factors that helped the development gain planning permission was the inclusion of a green roof in the design. The 4,000 m^{2} (43,000 square feet) green roof was designed to disguise the new service station as part of the landscape. With the Cotswolds on one side and Robinswood Hill on the other, every effort had to be made to reduce the aesthetic and biological impact the project had. A bespoke seed mix was used which was intended to mimic the natural vegetation of the surrounding landscape. Species such as birdsfoot trefoil and yellow rattle were included to attract UK native pollinators such as bees and butterflies.

| Previous: Strensham | Motorway service stations on the M5 motorway | Next: Michaelwood |
