= Westmorland =

Historic county of England

Coordinates: 54°30′N 2°35′W

- Historic county
- Flag

- Ancient extent of Westmorland
- Area
  - 1831: 485,990 acres (1,966.7 km^{2})
  - 1911: 505,330 acres (2,045.0 km^{2})
  - 1961: 504,917 acres (2,043.33 km^{2})
- Population
  - 1911: 63,575
  - 1961: 67,180
- History
  - Origin: Barony of Kendal, Barony of Westmorland
  - Created: 13th century
  - Succeeded by: Cumbria
- Status: Historic county (current); Ceremonial county (until 1974); Administrative county (1889–1974)
- Chapman code: WES
- Government: Westmorland County Council (1889–1974)
  - HQ: Appleby (historic county town); County Hall, Kendal (1889–1974)
- Arms of Westmorland County Council
- Subdivisions
  - Type: Baronies and Wards
  - Units: Westmorland: •East •West; Kendal: •Kendal •Lonsdale

Westmorland (/ˈwɛstmərlənd/, formerly also spelt Westmoreland) is an area of North West England which was historically a county. The area included part of the Lake District and the southern Vale of Eden, and its inhabitants were known as Westmerians.

The county had an administrative function from the 12th century until 1974, when it was subsumed into Cumbria together with Cumberland, the Sedbergh area of Yorkshire, and the Furness area of Lancashire. It gives its name to the Westmorland and Furness unitary authority area, which covers a larger area than the historic county.

== Early history ==
=== Background ===
At the beginning of the 10th century a large part of modern day Cumbria was part of the Kingdom of Strathclyde, and was known as "Scottish Cumberland". The Rere Cross was ordered by Edmund I (r.939–946) to serve as a boundary marker between England and Scotland ("Scottish Cumberland"). (Note: Scalacronica . . .from a boundary stone, the pre-Norman stump of which still remains, and which, according to the Scala cronica (1280), was fixed by King Edward (died 946) (Note: There is some confusion here since Edward the Elder died in 924. It is assumed that it was Edmund I (r.939-946), King of the English, who ordered the stone cross. See List of English monarchs > House of Wessex.) as the boundary between England and Scottish Cumberland. (fn. 1) It is there called the Reir Croiz de Staynmore and the hospital (Note: WiKtionary : Middle English < hospital > A hostel or guesthouse; a place of accommodation or lodging.) , being near, was occasionally called Rerecross hospital but more commonly the Spital on Stainmoor. . .)

=== County of Westmorland ===
At the time of Domesday Book in 1086, the county did not exist; half was considered to form part of Yorkshire and the other half part of Scotland. Before 1226, the Barony of Kendal was part of the Honour of Lancaster while the Barony of Westmorland was part of the Earldom of Carlisle, the latter became Cumberland and was part of Scotland at times.

Both baronies became a single county of Westmorland in 1226/7. Neighbouring Lancashire was also formed at this time. Appleby was the historic county town, having been chartered in 1179. It was a parliamentary borough from 1295 to 1832, and incorporated by letters patent in 1574.

=== Geography ===
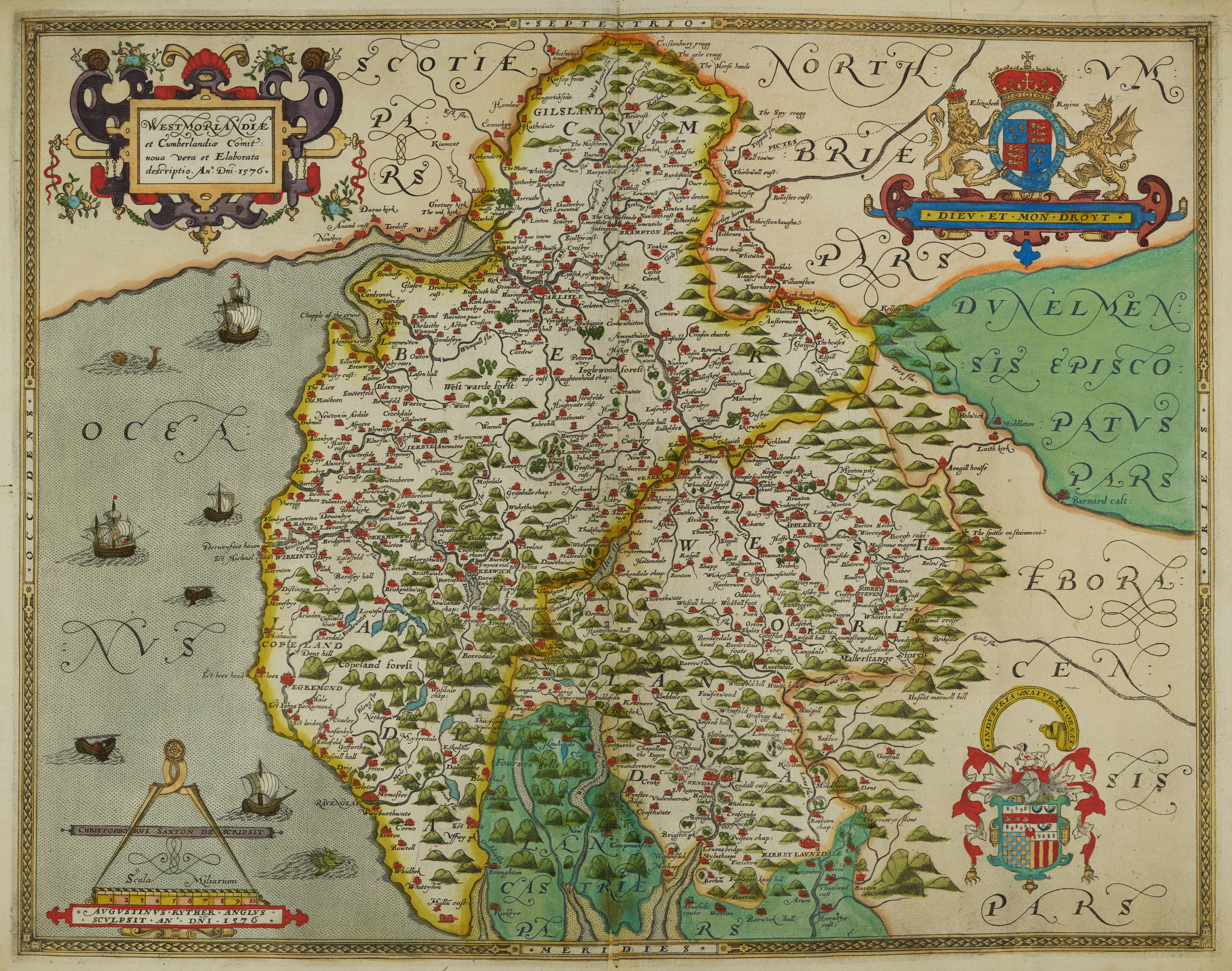
Hand-drawn map of Westmorland and Cumberland by Christopher Saxton from 1576

Westmorland bordered Cumberland to the north, County Durham and Yorkshire to the east, and Lancashire to the south and west. Windermere formed part of the western border with Lancashire north of the sands, and Ullswater part of the border with Cumberland. The highest point of the county is Helvellyn, at 3,117 feet (950 metres). According to the 1831 census the county covered an area of 485,990 acres (196,670 hectares).

==== Division into wards ====
Westmorland was subdivided into the two baronies of Westmorland (or sometimes Appleby) and Kendal. As with Cumberland, Durham and Northumberland it was divided into wards. The baronies were each further subdivided into two wards:

- Westmorland
  - East ward – Appleby, Brough, Kirkby Stephen, Orton, Tebay
  - West ward – Askham, Bampton, Barton, Patterdale, Shap, Yanwath
- Kendal
  - Kendal ward – Ambleside, Burton-in-Kendal, Grasmere, Grayrigg, Kentmere, Kendal, Windermere
  - Lonsdale ward – Kirkby Lonsdale

== Modern history ==
In 1889, under the Local Government Act 1888, a county council was created for Westmorland, taking functions from the quarter sessions. The county council was based at the County Hall in Kendal, although the assizes were held in the Shire Hall in the historic county town of Appleby. Kendal had been chartered as a municipal borough in 1835, Appleby in 1885. The county had no county boroughs throughout its history, so the administrative county, the area under the control of the county council, was coterminous with the geographic county.

Aside from the two municipal boroughs of Kendal and Appleby, the Local Government Act 1894 divided the county into urban districts and rural districts:

- Five urban districts: Ambleside, Bowness on Windermere, Grasmere, Kirkby Lonsdale, Windermere
- Three rural districts: West Ward, East Westmorland, South Westmorland

In 1905, a new Shap urban district was formed, while Windermere absorbed the neighbouring Bowness UD.

A County Review Order in 1935 reduced the number of districts in the county:

- A new Lakes Urban District was formed by the merger of Ambleside and Grasmere UDs and adjacent parishes in West Ward and South Westmorland RDs
- East Westmorland RD, most of West Ward RD and Shap UD were merged to form North Westmorland Rural District
- South Westmorland RD absorbed Kirkby Lonsdale UD, at the same time losing an area to Lakes UD.

Despite their title, many of Westmorland's urban districts, such as Lakes, Grasmere, and Shap, were quite rural in character.

Westmorland in 1960

According to the 1971 census, Westmorland was the second least populated administrative county in England, after Rutland. The distribution of population was as follows:

District	Population
Municipal Borough of Appleby	1,944
Municipal Borough of Kendal	21,602
Lakes Urban District	5,815
Windermere Urban District	8,065
North Westmorland Rural District	14,778
South Westmorland Rural District	20,633

In 1974, under the Local Government Act 1972, the county council was abolished and its former area was combined with Cumberland and parts of Lancashire and Yorkshire to form the new county of Cumbria, administered by a new Cumbria County Council. The area formed parts of the districts of South Lakeland and Eden from 1974 to 2023.

In July 2021, Robert Jenrick, Secretary of State for Housing, Communities and Local Government announced the dissolution of Cumbria County Council and its six district councils and their replacement in April 2023 by two unitary authorities: Cumberland, and Westmorland and Furness. The latter re-united and re-established historic Westmorland within a single administrative unit, along with the Furness (Lancs), Penrith (Cumberland) and Sedbergh (Yorks) areas.

== Toponymy ==
J. E. Marr explains the name "Westmorland" thus:

The name applied to the district by the Anglo-Saxons was originally Westmoringaland, 'the land of the people of the western moors,' in distinction from that of the people of the eastern moors, on the east side of the Pennine chain. The present name has not, however, been derived from that of Westmoringaland, but from Westmarieland or Westmerieland, used in the twelfth century, hence Westmerland. The meaning of this is land of the western meres, and not moors. Mere means boundary as well as a lake, and it is doubtful whether the word as used here refers to lakes or boundaries. There is no doubt that Westmerland is the more correct spelling [...].

== Coat of arms ==
The College of Arms granted Westmorland County Council a coat of arms in 1926. The design of the shield referred to the two components of the county: on two red bars (from the arms of the de Lancaster family, Barons of Kendal) was placed a gold apple tree (from the seal of the borough of Appleby, for the Barony of Westmorland). The crest above the shield was the head of a ram of the local Herdwick breed. On the ram's forehead was a shearman's hook, a tool used in the handling of wool. The hook was part of the insignia of the borough of Kendal, the administrative centre of the county council.

== Legacy ==
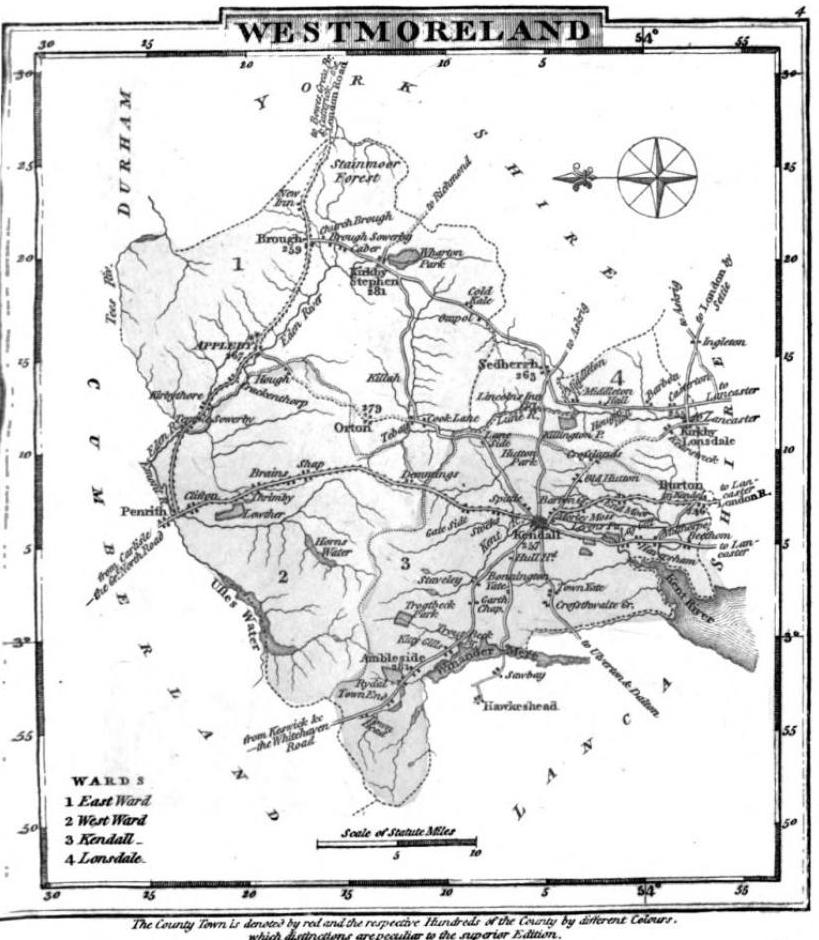
Map of Westmorland, 1824

in April 2023, Westmorland reappeared on national maps as part of Westmorland and Furness unitary authority. During the intervening 1974–2023 period, Westmorland has still been used as a place name by organisations and businesses in the area such as:

- The Westmorland Gazette (founded 1818)
- The Westmorland County Agricultural Society (founded 1799), which organises the annual Westmorland County Agricultural Society Show
- The Westmorland County Football Association, the regional division of the Football Association that administers many football leagues including the Westmorland Association Football League.
- The Westmorland Geological Society (formed 1973)
- The Cumberland and Westmorland Antiquarian and Archaeological Society (founded 1866)
- The Westmorland Youth Orchestra
- The Westmorland Shopping Centre, Kendal
- The Westmorland Cricket League
- Westmorland Motorway Services, the company behind Tebay services in Westmorland and Gloucester Services.
- In 1974 the successor parish council formed for the former borough of Appleby adopted the name Appleby-in-Westmorland.
- Westmorland General Hospital in Kendal
- Westmorland croquet club

Most of the historic county lies within the Westmorland and Lonsdale parliamentary constituency.

In June 1994, during the 1990s UK local government reform, the Local Government Commission published draft recommendations suggesting that Westmorland's border with Yorkshire and Lancashire be restored for ceremonial purposes. The final recommendations, published in October 1994, did not include such recommendations, apparently due to lack of expression of support for the proposal to the commission.

In September 2011, the Westmorland Association, a local society which promotes the county's identity, successfully registered the Flag of Westmorland with the Flag Institute.

In 2013, the Secretary of State for Communities and Local Government, Eric Pickles, formally recognised and acknowledged the continued existence of England's 39 historic counties, including Westmorland.

In April 2023, local government in Cumbria was reorganised into two unitary authority areas, one of which is named Westmorland and Furness and covers all of the historic county along with parts of historic Yorkshire, Lancashire and Cumberland.

== Notable people ==
- Tom Barker, trade unionist and socialist, born in Crosthwaite
- St. John Boste, Roman Catholic priest and martyr
- Margaret Cropper, poet
- Nicholas Freeston (1907–1978), award-winning Lancashire poet, born in Kendal
- William Parr, 1st Baron Parr of Kendal, who was father to Sir Thomas Parr of Kendal and thus the grandfather of Queen Catherine Parr, Henry VIII's sixth wife. The Parrs' ancestral castle, Kendal Castle, is located in Kendal.
- George Romney, portrait painter, many paintings by him at Kendal Town Hall
- David Starkey, Historian
- John Young Stratton – author, essayist, social reformer and campaigner against rural poverty
- Sir Thomas Strickland carried the Flag of St. George at the Battle of Agincourt.
- Mary Wakefield, patron of music celebrated with annual Mary Wakefield Festival
- John Camm, early Quaker minister and writer
- Thomas Camm, Quaker minister and writer

== See also ==
- List of Lord Lieutenants for Westmorland
- List of High Sheriffs for Westmorland
- List of English and Welsh endowed schools (19th century)#Westmorland
- Custos Rotulorum of Westmorland – List of keepers of the Rolls
- Westmorland (UK Parliament constituency) – List of MPs for constituency of Westmorland
- Västmanland – Swedish historic county
- Westmorland and Furness – modern top-level council based on Westmorland
