= Kendal Castle =

Castle in Cumbria, England

Coordinates: 54.32492°N 2.73644°W

Kendal Castle is a medieval fortification to the east of the town of Kendal, Cumbria, in northern England. The castle, which is atop a glacial drumlin, was built in the 13th century as the Caput baroniae for the Barony of Kendal. By the 15th century, the Parr family owned the castle.

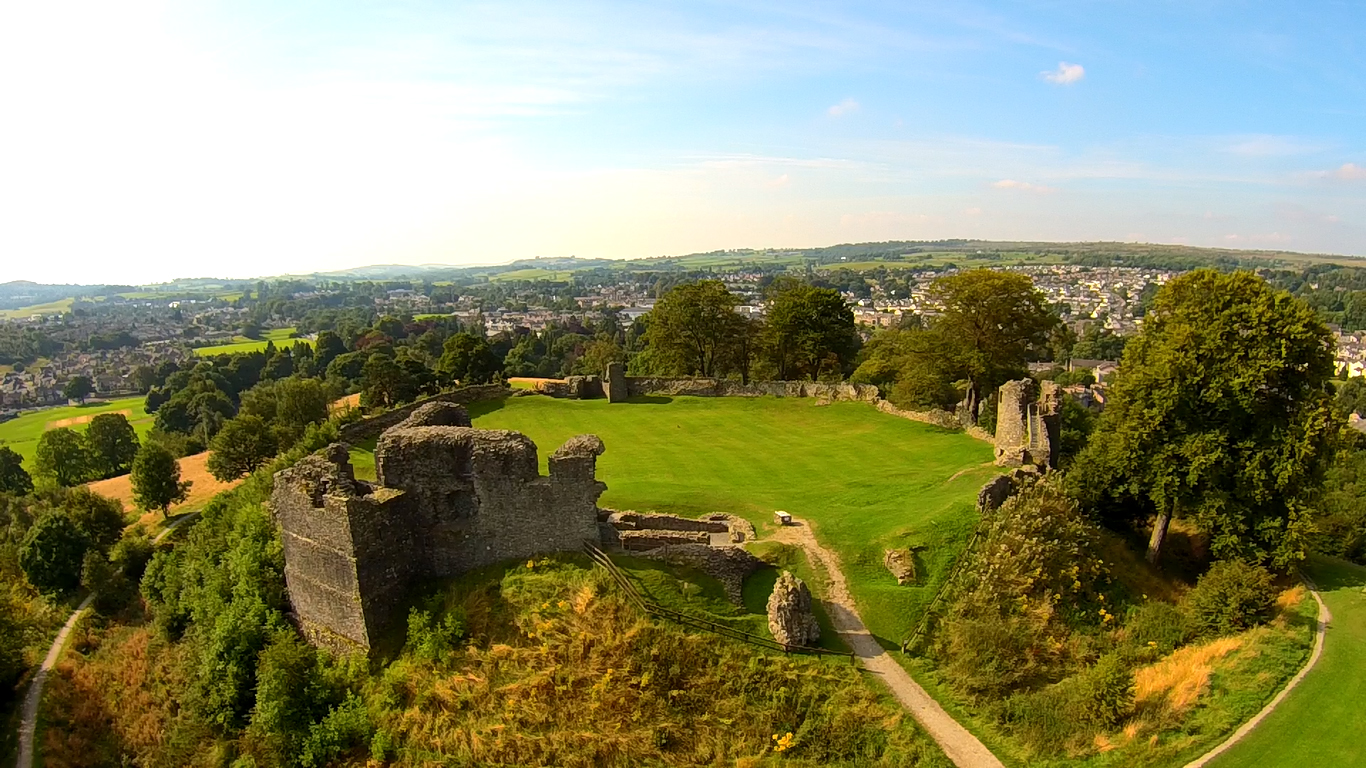
Kendal Castle looking south, with the town of Kendal visible behind.

== History ==
The earliest reference to a castle at Kendal dates from 1216 and might refer either to the surviving stone castle at Kendal or the older castle in the town, Castle Howe.

The castle was built in the late 12th century as the home of the Lancaster family, who were Barons of Kendal. The best-known family associated with the castle was the Parr family; including Queen Catherine Parr, the sixth wife of King Henry VIII of England. Her family had lived at Kendal since her ancestor Sir William Parr (c. 1350–1405) married the heiress of Kendal, Elizabeth Ros, during the reign of Edward III of England. By the time Catherine Parr was born, the family had long deserted the castle which was already falling into disrepair. Catherine's father Sir Thomas Parr preferred to live in the centre of court in London. Her grandfather Sir William Parr (1434–1483) seems to be the last of the Parrs to have lived at Kendal Castle. Catherine was once thought to have been born at the castle; however, modern research has shown that it was in great disrepair by the 16th century and she was most likely born in Blackfriars, London.

In 1566, the Crown confiscated the Parr family properties, including Kendal Castle.

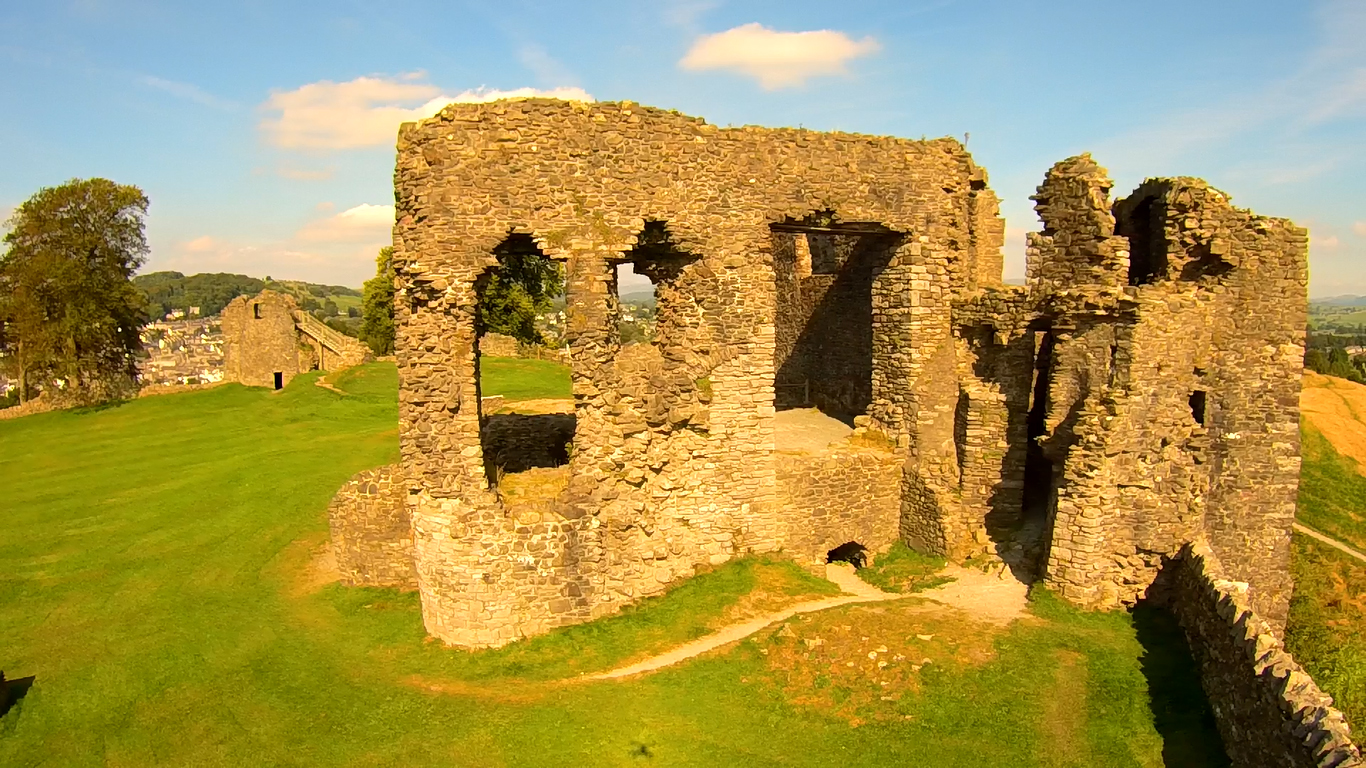
The two remaining significant ruins of Kendal Castle. In the foreground is part of the walls of the old manor hall, while the only surviving tower of the castle is visible rear left.

== Notable visitors ==
Poet John Keats visited the ruins on a walking tour of the Lakes in the summer of 1818. He and his companion Charles Brown stayed the previous night at Endmoor. They then walked on to Windermere.

== Layout ==
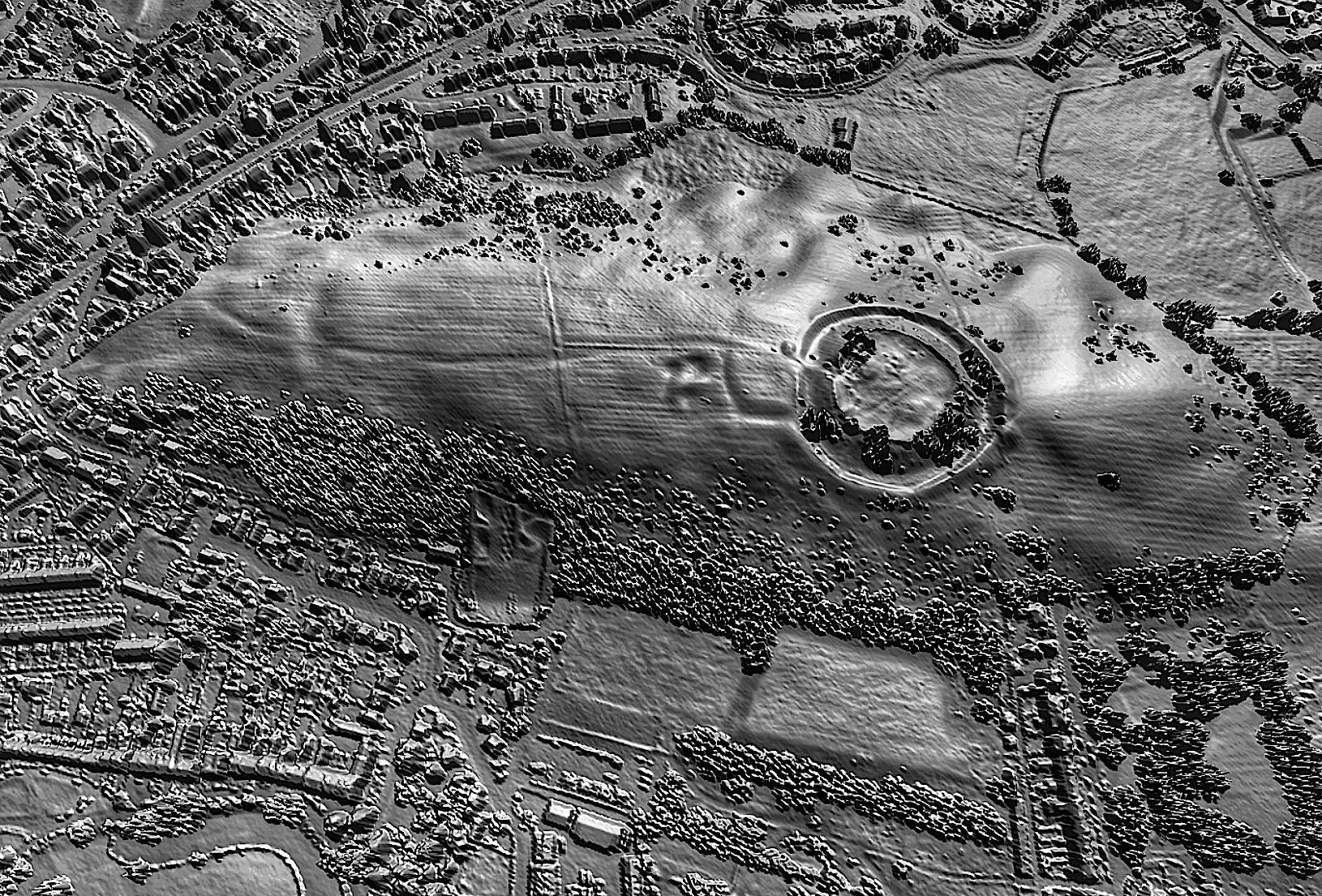
A lidar view of Kendal Castle.

The castle is roughly circular, and is bounded by an 26-metre (85 ft) wide ditch. The curtain wall was roughly circular, with three mural towers unevenly spaced around the circuit, and a gatehouse on the north side of the castle; in the interior, to the east of the entrance was a hall with a tower further to the east. An assessment by the Royal Commission on Historical Monuments of England in the first half of the 20th century suggested that the hall was built in the 14th century.

== Investigation and preservation ==
A small excavation led by J. E. Spence and involving pupils from Heversham Grammar School was carried out on the site of the gatehouse in 1951. Barbara Harbottle led excavations at the castle in 1967–69 and 1971. A geophysical survey was carried out at the castle in 2001 and identified a possible ditch.

The site, which is open to the public, is maintained and managed by Westmorland and Furness Council. On 1 April 2023, Local Government Reorganisation merged South Lakeland District Council, Eden District Council and Barrow Borough Council with Cumbria County Council to form a new unitary authority for the area.
