= Barony of Westmorland =

Barony of historical county of Westmorland, England

Coordinates: 54.578°N 2.489°W

The Barony of Westmorland (medieval Westmarieland or Westmaringaland) also known as North Westmorland, the Barony of Appleby, Appleshire or the Bottom of Westmorland, was one of two baronies making up the English historical county of Westmorland, the other being the Barony of Kendal. Both of them evolved from medieval feudal baronies. Geographically, the barony covered the northern part of the larger county of the same name, and was divided into two wards – East Ward and West Ward. It covered an area similar to that of the former Eden District of the new county of Cumbria, although it did not include Penrith, which was the administrative capital of the district.

While the Barony of Westmorland is part of the historic County of Westmorland, the latter covers a wider area. To avoid confusion, the barony has often been known by alternative names, including North Westmorland and names based on its largest town, Appleby, including the Barony of Appleby and Appleshire. It was also referred to as the Bottom of Westmorland because it is mostly made up of the low ground of the valley of the River Eden, surrounded by hills and mountains.

The barony has survived in various forms into modern times, but originated as a feudal barony, granted in 1203 or 1204 to Robert I de Vipont (or Vieuxpont, or Veteripont), for the service of four knight's fees. Earlier, in the 12th century, the lands from which the barony of Appleby were formed were controlled by the feudal baron of Burgh-by-Sands, Cumberland, of which the first recorded holder was Robert de Trevers, in the time of Henry I of England (1100–1135).

The county named Westmorland thus formed out of two feudal barony, including one with the same name, in several steps in the generations after the English permanently captured this territory in competition with Scotland. At first it appears that the "Barons" of Kendal were actually tenants of the lord who possessed north Westmorland at the time. But King Richard I of England, on 15 April 1190, acquitted the then Baron of Kendal, Gilbert fitz Reinfrid, of his dues to northern Westmorland. According to J.F. Curwen:

By these grants of the same date Gilbert fitz Roger fitz Reinfrid was endowed with full baronial status throughout Kentdale and the outlying members, including the manor of Morland and a considerable part of Barton. His service to the crown for the same being definitely fixed at the service of two knights. Thus the Barony of Appleby was created some thirteen years after the Barony of Kentdale.

As mentioned above, it was 13 years later in 1203 that the barony of Westmorland was granted for 4 knight's fees.

The division of Westmorland into two administrative wards, east and west, was much later, and as in other parts of England, large parishes split into smaller one over time also. However a rough list of old parishes corresponding to the two wards is as follows:

- East Ward: Appleby, Asby, Brough under Stainmore, Crosby Garrett, Dufton, Kirkby Stephen, Kirkby Thore, Long Marton, Great Musgrave, Newbiggin-on-Lune, Ormside (once "Ormshead" or "Ormesheved"), Orton (once "Overton"), "Ravenstonedale", "Warcop".
- West Ward: Askham, Cumbria, Barton St Michael, Brougham, Clifton, Cliburn, Crosby Ravensworth, Lowther, Morland, Shap (sometimes spelled as "Hepp" in old documents).
