= Tebay Services =

Motorway service stations in Cumbria, England

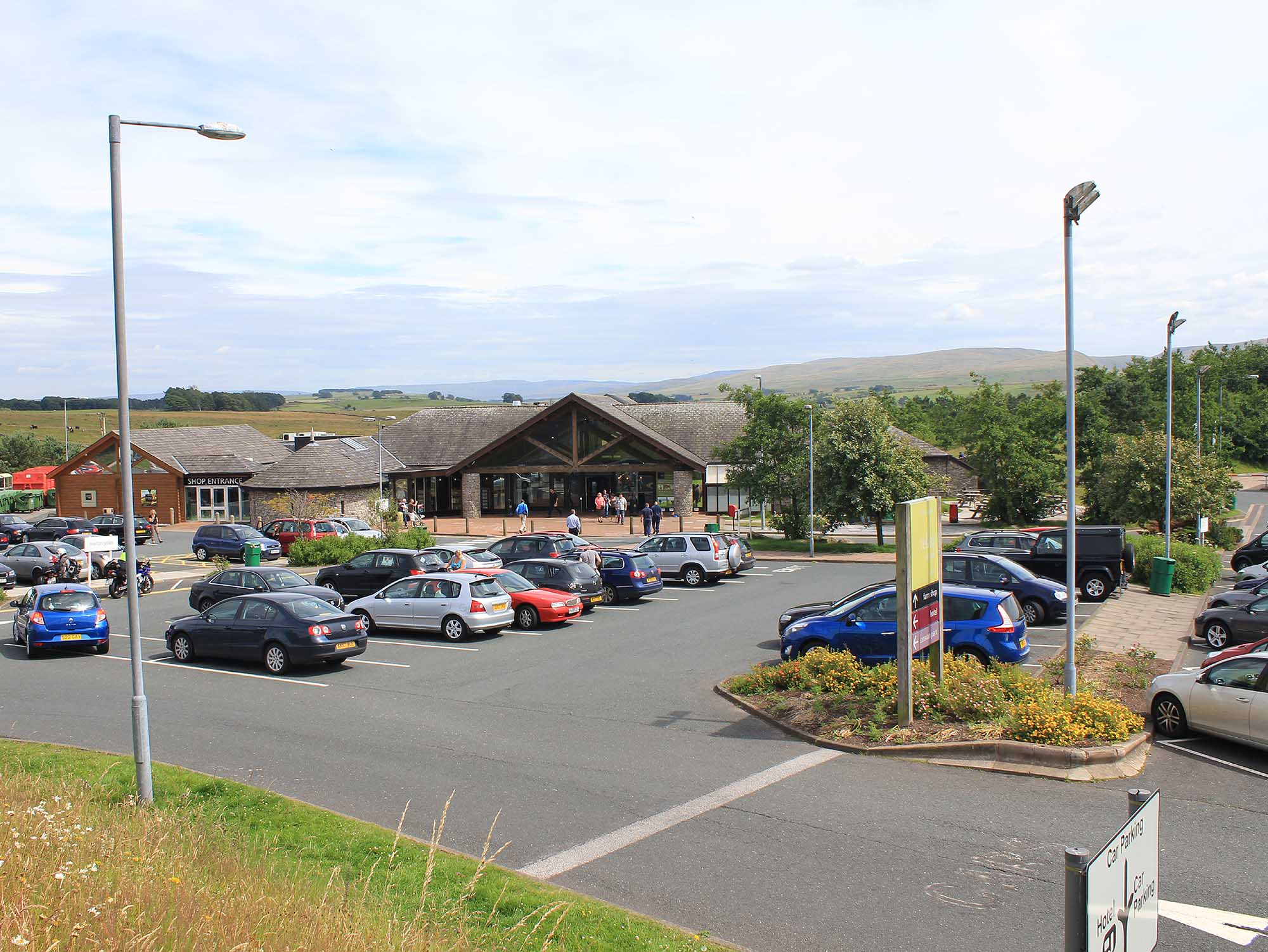
- View of East service station and car park

- Location in Cumbria, England Location in former Eden District, Cumbria Location on the UK motorway network

Information
- County: Cumbria
- Road: M6
- Coordinates: 54.45°N 2.608°W
- Operator: Westmorland Ltd
- Website: www.tebayservices.com

Northbound services
- Date opened: June 1972

Southbound services
- Date opened: 1993

Tebay Services are motorway service stations on the M6 motorway in the Westmorland and Furness district of Cumbria, England. The northbound opened in 1972 and the southbound in 1993. They are run by Westmorland Motorway Services, a family-run business which eschews the typical facilities at British motorway services for a farm shop and buildings in keeping with the local environment.

== Location ==
The services are between junctions 38 and 39, on the ascent from the Lune Valley to Shap summit. As the north and southbound carriageways diverge at this point, the two service areas are not actually adjacent to each other but a couple of hundred metres apart. The services are a mile north of junction 38, which is adjacent to the village of Tebay, although the services are in the civil parish of Orton.

== History ==
The M6 here passes through an environmentally sensitive area, and the services were sited in this location to fit in with the surrounding local area and provide a view away from the motorway. A corresponding southbound services, Killington Lake Services, was constructed at the same time, opening the previous month.

=== Construction ===
Tebay West (northbound) was first announced in November 1969. The first stage would consist only of a petrol station and 'snack bar', to cost £50,000, of 3,600 square yards, with no vehicle parking. Other service stations had also followed this plan, of petrol only first, with limited catering.

=== Opening ===
Tebay West Services, which serves the northbound carriageway, was opened in June 1972 by Peter Walker, Baron Walker of Worcester, two years after the M6 section between Lancaster and Penrith was completed.

Tebay East was opened in 1993, serving southbound traffic. Both are operated by an independent family-owned company, Westmorland Motorway Services, rather than a national chain. The same company runs Truckstop Services at junction 38 (just off the B6260 at Old Tebay), which opened in 1986 and caters for HGV and long-distance coaches, and Gloucester Services between junctions 11a and 12 of the M5 in Gloucestershire, which was built into the side of a hill and covered with grass to reduce its visual impact.

== Facilities ==
Tebay Services are in open countryside surrounded by trees, small lakes and panoramas of the Cumbrian landscape, and has its own duck pond. Westmorland shun typical motorway service food outlets. Instead, both Tebay outlets have award-winning farm shops, which sell local meat and other food, and insist on using local suppliers. The services have been praised as being the best in the country. In 2003, Westmorland won Best Local Retailer in BBC Radio 4's Food and Farming Awards, and in 2006 they were awarded Best Motorway Services in Britain by Which? The farm shops, which sell locally sourced produce, were officially opened by Prince Charles in 2004.

In addition, the northbound service area has a caravan park and a hotel. This site formerly served as the head office for Westmorland Motorway Services.

Next southbound: Killington Lake	Motorway service stations on the M6 motorway	Next northbound: Southwaite
