= Barony of Kendal =

Subdivision of the English historic county of Westmorland

Coordinates: 54.327°N 2.748°W

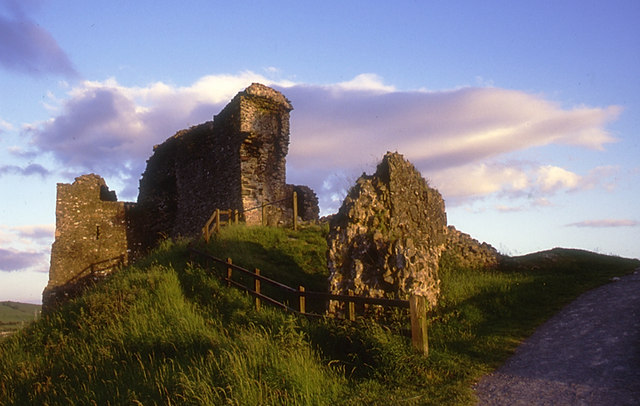
The ruins of Kendal Castle, the ancient seat of the Barons of Kendal.

The Barony of Kendal is a subdivision of the English historic county of Westmorland. It evolved from one of two ancient baronies that make up the county, the other being the Barony of Westmorland (also known as North Westmorland, or the Barony of Appleby). In 1974, the entire county became part of the modern county of Cumbria and ceased to have an administrative function. At the same time, Kendal borough along with some other rural and urban districts in Westmorland was merged with the neighbouring parts of Lancashire, Furness and Cartmel, and also the Sedbergh Rural District of the West Riding of Yorkshire into the new South Lakeland district of the new county.

The barony is the remnant of the feudal barony whose caput was at Kendal castle. The feudal barony had its own complex evolution, determined by the evolution of the families that owned it. For some purposes, it was therefore once considered to include parts of the Barony of Westmorland that were possessed by the original lords of Kendal, such as at least parts of the ancient parishes of Barton St Michael, and Morland.

In modern times, before it was scrapped, the barony came to be divided into two administrative wards, Kendal and Lonsdale, centred on the old church towns of Kendal (sometimes referred to historically as Kirkby Kendal), and Kirkby Lonsdale, which are respectively geographically centred on the valleys ("dales") of the rivers Kent and Lune. The parishes of the two wards are as follows:

- Kendal ward: Ambleside, Burton-in-Kendal, Grasmere, Grayrigg, Kentmere, Kendal, Windermere. (The parish of Kendal itself was large and contained 20 townships.)
- Lonsdale ward: Kirkby Lonsdale

== Location ==
Geographically, with the exception of its southern side, the Barony of Kendal is surrounded by mountainous terrain and water.

- On the longest part of its northern boundary, it is separated from the Barony of Westmorland by the natural boundary of the Shap Fells, which are part of the Lake District's "Far Eastern Fells", being described by Alfred Wainwright as "the high link between the Pennines and Lakeland".
- In its eastern corner, it borders on the ancient Yorkshire parish of Sedbergh, which is nestled in the Pennines, and now part of Cumbria.
- To the south, the barony borders on the Lonsdale Hundred of northern Lancashire, and it touches the sea in its southeast, in Morecambe Bay, where the River Kent enters.
- To the west of Kendal, starting at the sea and going north, the barony borders first with the old Lancashire parish of Cartmell, and then with the eastern side of Windermere, which has the old Lancashire Furness Fells on the other side. (Both these old parts of Lancashire are now within Cumbria.)
- And in its extreme northwest, the barony's parish of Grasmere stretched around the top of Furness, and reaches towards the heights around Scafell, and the Central Fells that separate the barony from the old county of Cumberland, (now also part of Cumbria). On its north, Grasmere also stretches into the Kirkstone Pass section of the Helvellyn range in the Eastern Fells, which in turn link to the Shap Fells described above.

== Origins ==
Unlike many parts of Cumbria, the "Kentdale" area was already noted in the Domesday book. Much of Kendal parish was in the hands of a person called Gillemichael. Much of the Lonsdale area had been under control of a person called Torfin, but had then came into the king's hands. Other parts, including Beetham, were held by Earl Tostig, whose possessions later passed in some cases to the king, and in others to Roger of Poitou. The whole area was only later united as one unit under Kendal when it eventually came into the hands of Ivo de Taillebois. William Farrer has made suggestions about how to interpret the names of the lands around Kendal mentioned there under Gillemichael.

- "Strickland": Staveley, Kentmere, Longsleddale, Bannisdale, Strickland Roger, Strickland Ketel, Crook and Winster.
- "Kirkby Kendal": Kirkland, Nethergraveship, Underbarrow with Bradleyfield (anciently Greenrigg), New Hutton and Scalthwaiterigg.
- "Mint": Farrer thought possibly Mintsfeet and Spittal.
- "Patton": Skelsmergh, possibly Bretherdale and Fawcett Forest, Selside with Whitwell, Whinfell, Docker, Lambrigg, Grayrigg and Dillicar.
- "Helsington" included Sizergh.
- "Bodelford" is now called Natland.
- "Hutton": Old Hutton and Holmescales. But, says Farrer, "Killington and Firbank being in the parish of Kirkby Lonsdale are not likely to have been included in Hutton".

Farrer also wrote that:

The parishes of Windermere and Grasmere were "forest". Down to a comparatively recent period, there were no freeholds in these parishes except the Fleming estate in Rydal and Loughrigg, monastic land such as the Conishead Priory estate at Baisbrown, a small freehold estate in Little Langdale, and a freehold at Lickbarrow. Windermere water was a several fishery of the lords of Kentdale, and so it has always lain in Kentdale and the county of Westmorland.

There is some doubt about who should be named as the first true Baron of Kendal. It is generally associated with the family of William de Lancaster I, and before him, with his apparent relatives, the Norman, Ivo de Taillebois, and William's uncle, the Anglo-Saxon Ketel (or Chetell) son of Eldred of Workington. William de Lancaster I was in any case the first administrator of the region after England recovered the area from King David I of Scotland.

The coat of arms attributed to William de Lancaster I and several of his descendants who were Barons of Kendal.

William is thought to be related to Ivo de Taillebois, who helped administer the Cumbrian region and formed Kendal into what would become the barony, under the first two Norman kings, William the Conqueror and William Rufus. Ketel fitz Eldred is known to have been lord over similar areas after the death of Ivo, and before the time when William took over. But between Ivo and William, a period which included Scottish occupation, the history of the Barony of Kendal is very unclear.

The arms of Westmorland. In modern times, the two red bars were incorporated into the arms of the traditional county of Westmorland, as a representation of the Kendal half of that county. The apple tree represents Appleby, or Northern Westmorland.

Two historical records claim a direct line of father-son descent from Ivo to Eldred to Ketel to Gilbert, which was the name of the father of William de Lancaster (also known as "William son of Gilbert"). These were records made much later in Cockersand Abbey and St Mary's Abbey in Yorkshire. But modern commentators believe this to be impossible, and made by placing a sequence of lords into the simplest possible family tree. Furthermore, records have been found which describe Ketel not as William's grandfather, but as his uncle (Latin avunculus, so probably a maternal uncle).

More contemporary is a record in the Coucher Book of Furness Abbey. Helewise, granddaughter and heir of William is a party, and it was asserted there that William de Lancaster I had first been known as William de Tailboys, before receiving the right to be called "Willelmum de Lancastre, Baronem de Kendale". This is the only relatively contemporary evidence that William had a Taillebois connection, probably through his father Gilbert, and it also suggests that during the 12th century, Kendal was associated somehow with the honour of Lancaster, because William was described as becoming Baron of one, and taking up the title from the other. William Farrer argued that such links go back before 1066. He argued that Kendal and the neighbouring parts of Lancashire, Furness to the west, and northern Lancashire to the south, formed a single administrative district in the old Anglo-Saxon kingdom of Northumbria.

Furness, Kendal, and North Lancashire, bounded on the north by the river Duddon, Dunmail Raise, Kirkstone Pass, and Borrow Beck, and on the south by the river Ribble, formed a complete fiscal area of five hundred teamlands for the levying of Danegeld.

So during the lifetime of William de Lancastre, the link between Kendal and Lancashire was by this account an older link, which was only broken later as the honour of Lancaster came under more direct royal control, and Furness came under the control of the powerful Abbey of Furness. Documents show that disputes concerning control of Furness continued between the Barons of Kendal and the Abbey of Furness for several generations.

Despite common assertions to the contrary, Farrer and Curwen thought that William was probably not a true "Baron" of Kendal, in the sense of being a direct tenant of the monarch, because he appears to have had lords above him apart from the king. Farrer wrote in the Introduction to Records of Kendal:

After a careful review of the evidence which has been sketched above, the author is of opinion that no barony or reputed barony of Kentdale existed prior to the grants of 1189–90; and that neither William de Lancaster, son of Gilbert, nor William de Lancaster II, his son and successor, can be rightly described as "baron" of Kentdale.

Instead, Farrer and Curwen believed that William I and II were actually tenants of the lord controlling northern Westmorland. Therefore, the eventual county of Westmorland was not originally a merger, but a takeover, which was then re-structured in the time of King Richard I of England. On 15 April 1190, Richard acquitted the then Baron of Kendal, Gilbert fitz Reinfrid, of his dues to northern Westmorland. It was only 13 years later, on 28 October 1203, that King John granted to Robert de Veteriponte in fee "Appleby and Brough [both in northern Westmorland] with all their appendages with the bailiwick and the rent of the county with the services of all tenants (not holding of the king by military service) to hold by the service of four knights." The service to the crown for Kendal was by comparison the service of two knights.

There was a second William de Lancaster, son of the first, who was either the next baron, or according to Farrer the first definite Baron of Kendal. And after him came the above-mentioned Gilbert son of Roger fitz Reinfrid, the husband of Helewise, who was the daughter and heiress of William de Lancastre II. Gilbert was one of the barons whose seal is found on Magna Carta, and he participated in the so-called First Baron's War.

== The division into "fees" ==
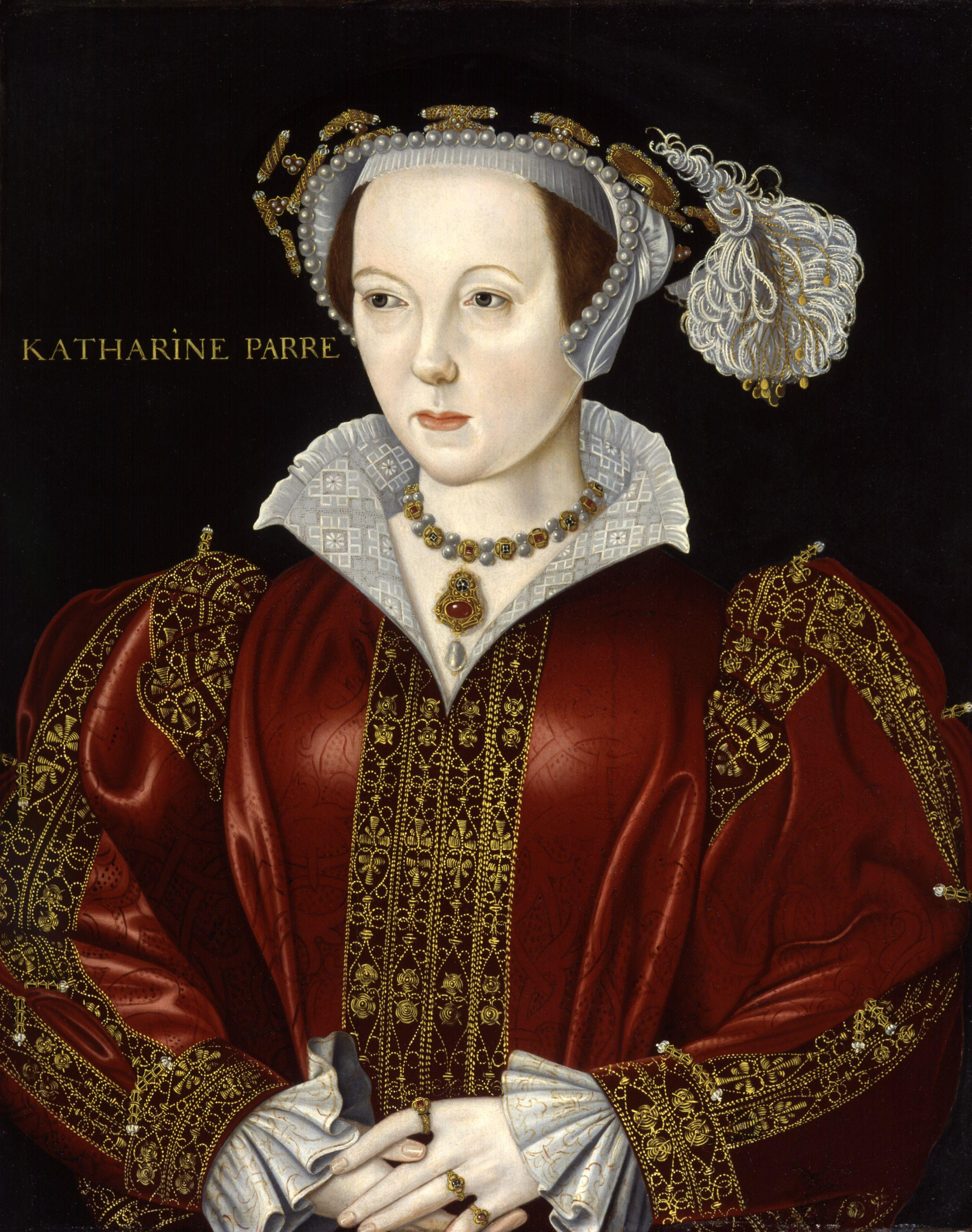
Catherine Parr, who married Henry VIII. Her brother was the last Parr to possess the Marquis Fee division of the Barony of Kendal.

The last true Baron of the whole of the Barony of Kendal was the son of Gilbert fitz Reinfrid, who used the name William de Lancastre III. After his death, the Barony was divided between the husbands of his daughters. The most important division was into the so-called Marquis fee, that eventually passed from the de Ros family to the Parr family, and the Richmond fee, which stayed with the Lyndesey family until it came into the hands of the French lords of Coucy, upon which point the royal family took control, giving it for a time to John de Coupland.

The Marquis fee was further divided with the splitting off of the so-called Lumley fee, which originated with a part that went to the Thweng family. In many cases, old manors were themselves divided into parts. In the time of Charles II, not long before they both ended up in the possession of the Lowther Earls of Lonsdale, the two main fees were defined as follows:

- Richmond fee. Grasmere, Langdale, Loughrigg, Ambleside, Undermillbeck, Troutbeck, Applethwaite, Crossthwaite and Lyth, New Hutton, Casterton, Strickland Ketel and Helsington, Thornton, Westhouse and Maysinghill.
- Marquis fee. Grasmere, Langdale, Underbarrow, Staveley and Hugill, Overknotts or Nethergraveship, Skalthwaite Rigg, Hay, Hutton in the Hay, Strickland Roger, Greenhead, Hugill, Crosthwaite.

To which we can add a description of the Lumley fee, which ended up in the possession of the Howard, Earls of Berkshire.

- Lumley fee. Included Helsington, Crosthwaite and Lyth, and one fourth of the town of Kendal.

And some smaller possessions also split off outside these large fees:

- John Hotham (heir of Margaret de Thweng shown below) received part of Staveley and other lands. It was much later merged into the Lumley fee.
- Rydal was granted by a niece to Roger de Lancaster, a bastard half brother to William de Lancaster III. (He also received parts of Barton, in Westmorland.)
- The Stapleton descendants of Laderine de Thweng received Kentmere.

== Historical holdings ==
A short summary of the historical dividing of the feudal barony can be summarised as follows:

William de Lancaster I
William de Lancaster II
Helwise de Lancaster	Gilbert Fitz Reinfrid
William de Lancaster III mar. Agnes de Brus	Helwise de Lancaster mar. Peter de Brus II (Marquis Fee)	Alice de Lancaster mar. William de Lyndesey (Richmond Fee)	Serota de Lancaster mar. Alan de Multon
no children	no children
Peter de Brus III (no children)	Margaret mar. Robert de Ros	Agnes mar. Walter de Fauconberge (no share of the Barony)	Lucy mar.Marmaduke de Thweng	Laderine mar. John de Bella Aqua (Bellewe)	Walter de Lyndesey
William de Ros	Marmaduke de Thweng	Stapleton family of Kentmere	William de Lyndesey
William de Ros	William	Robert	Thomas	Lucy mar.Marmaduke de Lumley	Margaret mar. Robert Hilton	Katherine mar. Ralph Daubeney	William de Lyndesey
Thomas de Ros	Ralph de Lumley	John de Lumley	Maud de Hilton mar. John de Hotham	Isabel de Hilton mar. Walter Pedwardine	Elizabeth Daubeney mar. William Botreux	Christiane de Lyndesey mar.Ingelram de Guisnes; Lord of Coucy in France
John de Ros	Thomas de Lumley	Thomas de Lumley	John de Hotham	Robert de Pedwardine	William Botreux	William de Coucy
Elizabeth de Ros mar. William Parr	no children	George de Lumley	descendants	descendants	descendants	William de Coucy
Parr family until William (time of Elizabeth I)	John de Lumley

== Sources ==
- Farrer's Introduction to his Records of Kendal British History Online & Edenlinks website.
