= Listed buildings in Shap Rural =

Shap Rural is a civil parish in Westmorland and Furness, Cumbria, England. It contains eleven listed buildings that are recorded in the National Heritage List for England. All the listed buildings are designated at Grade II, the lowest of the three grades, which is applied to "buildings of national importance and special interest". The parish is almost entirely rural, and the listed buildings consist of farmhouses and farm buildings, three bridges, a lime kiln, and a monument.

== Buildings ==
Name and location	Photograph	Date	Notes
Shap Abbey Farmhouse and byre range 54.52995°N 2.70004°W	—	16th century (possible)	The farmhouse was remodelled in the 19th century, the byre range having been added probably in the 17th to 18th century including an extension to the house. The buildings are all in re-used stone from Shap Abbey, and have slate roofs and two storeys. The house has quoins and five bays. The door is in a re-used medieval doorcase that has a semicircular head and roll-moulding. Above the door is a decorative medieval corbel, and the windows are sashes in chamfered surrounds. The byre range to the south has an L-shaped plan, and contains doors, some blocked with inserted windows, loft doors, a stable door, and windows some of which are blocked.
Bridge over River Lowther; 54.54165°N 2.72150°W		Late 17th century	The bridge carries a road over the River Lowther. It is in stone, and consists of three segmental arches, each with a span of about 35 feet (11 m). There are cutwaters rising to polygonal pedestrian refuges. The roadway is about 10 feet (3.0 m) wide, the stone parapets are about 3 feet (0.91 m) high, and have been partly replaced by wooden fencing.
Mullender and barn 54.51368°N 2.74699°W		Late 17th century	The farmhouse and attached barn and the separate barn are in stone with Westmorland slate roofs. The farmhouse has a plinth, quoins, and two storeys. It contains an entrance on the left and three small windows under a continuous slate hood mould. The threshing barn has a single storey and a rectangular plan, with a plinth and quoins, and a doorway with a lintel on corbels.
Hardendale Hall, byres and scullery 54.52473°N 2.64543°W	—	1747	The farmhouse probably has a 17th-century core. The buildings are in stone with quoins, two storeys, and have slate roofs with stone copings. The house has three bays, a door with a pediment above which is a dated and initialled panel, and mullioned windows with casements. To the right is a recessed byre with steps leading up to a loft door, and at right angles to it is a single-storey lean-to scullery. To the left of the house is another recessed byre, also with external steps, and with an outshut.
Threshing barn and byre, Hardendale Hall; 54.52484°N 2.64495°W	—	18th century (probable)	The farm building is in stone on a plinth, with quoins, a rear outshut, and a slate roof with a stone ridge. It contains a segmental-headed wagon entrance, a winnowing door, and a byre door, all with chamfered surrounds.
Naddle Old Bridge; 54.53670°N 2.75851°W		18th century (probable)	The bridge, now disused, formerly carried a road over Haweswater Beck. It is in stone and consists of a single segmental arch with long thin voussoirs. The roadway is about 3.5 metres (11 ft) wide, and there are abutments but no parapets.
Parish Crag Bridge; 54.53632°N 2.71972°W		18th century (probable)	A packhorse bridge crossing Swindale Beck, it is in sandstone, and consists of a single segmental arch with a span of about 20 feet (6.1 m). Between the voussoirs is slate packing. The pathway is about 2.5 feet (0.76 m) wide, and the parapets, which are splayed at the north end, are about 3 feet (0.91 m) high.
Wagon shed and byre, Hardendale Hall; 54.52476°N 2.64520°W	—	Late 18th to early 19th century (probable)	The building is in stone on a boulder plinth, with quoins and a slate roof with a stone ridge. It contains double wagon doors, a byre door, and external steps leading to a loft door.
Scullery range, Shap Abbey Farm; 54.52992°N 2.69950°W	—	Late 18th to early 19th century (probable)	The scullery range, later used for other purposes, is in stone, probably re-used from Shap Abbey, and has a slate roof. There is a single storey and five bays, and the building contains three plank doors, double garage doors, and a sash window.
Wagon shed with hay loft, Shap Abbey Farm; 54.52978°N 2.69946°W	—	Late 18th to early 19th century (probable)	The wagon shed and hay loft are built in re-used stone from Shap Abbey, and have quoins and a slate roof with a stone ridge. There are two storeys and five bays, and the building contains two segmental-arched wagon entrances, plank doors and windows. In the centre, steps parallel to the wall lead up to a loft door.
Lime kiln 54.54358°N 2.70527°W	—	Early to mid 19th century (probable)	The disused lime kiln is built in drystone with quoins, and is about 25 feet (7.6 m) high. On the north side is a hearth entrance with a segmental head, about 8 feet (2.4 m) high, and a ramp leads round the other sides to the top.
Mary's Pillar; 54.55126°N 2.71497°W		1854	A stone monument on a viewpoint, about 20 feet (6.1 m) high. It has a square plan and a plinth, it is in three stages with bands, and has a pyramidal top stage. On the southwest side is a seat in a semicircular-headed recess, and in the middle stage is an inscribed panel in a triangular recess.
