= Listed buildings in Bampton, Cumbria =

Bampton is a civil parish in Westmorland and Furness, Cumbria, England. It contains 35 buildings that are recorded in the National Heritage List for England. Of these, two are listed at Grade II*, the middle grade of the three grades, and the others are at Grade II, the lowest grade. The parish contains the villages of Bampton and Bampton Grange and smaller settlements, but is mainly rural. Most of the listed buildings are houses and associated structures, farmhouses and farm buildings in the villages and scattered around the countryside. The other listed buildings include a former boundary cross, a church, a monument in the churchyard, two bridges, a public house, and a limekiln.

== Key ==
Grade	Criteria
II*	Particularly important buildings of more than special interest
II	Buildings of national importance and special interest

== Buildings ==
Name and location	Photograph	Date	Notes	Grade
Cross, Bampton Grange Cemetery; 54.55698°N 2.73875°W		14th century	A former boundary cross that was moved to its present site in 1907. It is in sandstone, 6 feet (1.8 m) high, and consists of a square chamfered column carrying a weathered florial cross head. The column stands on a 20th-century sandstone base to which an inscribed bronze plaque is attached.	II
Low Rough Hill and barn 54.56585°N 2.77614°W	—	1382	There were later alterations and additions to the house and barn. The house is roughcast with an L-shaped plan. There are two storeys and a front of seven bays. On the front is a gabled porch, the inner doorway has an initialled and dated lintel, and the windows are sashes. The barn is attached to the east, it has outshuts, and contains entrances, windows, a blocked winnowing door, and square ventilation holes.	II
Dovecote, Bampton Hall; 54.55755°N 2.75097°W	—	16th century (probable)	The dovecote is in stone with large quoins and a slate roof. Inside, the walls are lined with slate shelves on stone supports, and there is a fireplace and a half-loft.	II
Former yeoman's hall house 54.57257°N 2.74982°W	—	16th century (probable)	The hall house is in stone, incorporating boulders in the foundations, and has a roof in Lakeland blue slate. There are two storeys and six bays. The openings include doors, windows and a cart entrance, and there are external steps leading to an upper floor doorway.	II
Knipe Hall and barn 54.56892°N 2.74636°W		Late 16th century	The house and barn are in stone with slate roofs. The house has two storeys, five bays, and a gabled wing protruding at the south. Most of the windows are mullioned, and some contain sliding sashes. There are hood moulds over both floors, and an outshut to the rear. The barn to the north has a triangular initialled datestone and various entrances.	II
Thornthwaite Hall and barn 54.53957°N 2.75408°W		Late 16th century (probable)	This originated as a country house, a tower was added to the northwest after 1576, and in about 1612 a banqueting hall was added to the east end. Part of the banqueting hall has been converted into a barn, retaining a fireplace and a garderobe turret, and the battlements on the tower have been replaced by a pitched roof. The building is in stone, partly rendered, with sandstone dressings, some quoins, and a slate roof. Most of the windows are mullioned.	II
Grange Farmhouse; 54.55581°N 2.74233°W	—	Mid 17th century	The farmhouse was altered in 1703, and again in the late 18th and early 19th centuries. It is rendered on a stone plinth and has a green slate roof with stepped gables. The house has two storeys and an L-shaped plan, with a front of three bays, a single-bay extension to the left, and a two-storey single-bay wing at the rear. The original part has two 17th-century windows, one retaining its mullion, and sash windows in stone surrounds. In the extension is a doorway with a Tudor arched head and an initialled and dated lintel. The windows in the rear wing are a mix of sashes and casements, and there is an outshut with external steps leading to a loft door.	II
Low Scarside and barn 54.55982°N 2.71949°W	—	1674	A farmhouse and barn, now derelict, in limestone, on a plinth with a green slate roof. The house has two storeys, three bays, a rear single-storey single-bay extension, and a three-bay barn at a right angle, forming a T-shaped plan. There is a gabled stone porch with internal seats, a door with a chamfered surround, windows with mullions removed, and hood moulds. In the barn is a segmental-arched cart entrance, chamfered doorways, a loft door, and ventilation slits. Inside the house is an inglenook with a bressumer.	II
Carhullan farmhouse and barn 54.55677°N 2.78977°W	—	Late 17th century	The farmhouse is in painted stone on a boulder plinth, with a roof of Lakeland slate. There are two storeys and on the front is a porch with a crow-stepped gable and a finial, and a doorway with a moulded architrave. The windows either have a single light or are mullioned. The barn is in slate stone with a tile roof, and has two storeys and an L-shaped plan. The openings include a segmental-arched entrance, vents, mullioned windows and a sash window.	II
Low Crag; 54.56882°N 2.76423°W	—	Late 17th century (probable)	A stone house with a slate roof, part of which has been converted from a barn. It has two storeys and five bays. The windows vary; some are sashes with sandstone surrounds, some are horizontally-sliding sashes, one is fixed, one is a fire window, and one is mullioned. There is a segmental-headed barn entrance, two outshuts, and a lean-to privy.	II
Stanegarth and outbuilding 54.55253°N 2.77867°W	—	1679	A house and attached outbuilding in stone with a slate roof. The house has two storeys and five bays, with part of the outbuilding incorporated into the house. On the front is a two-storey porch, and above the doorway is an initialled and dated lintel. The windows are mullioned, and some have hood moulds. Features in the outbuilding include a segmental-arched opening, a crow-stepped gable, windows of various types, and a lean-to.	II
Bampton Hall; 54.55773°N 2.75121°W	—	17th or early 18th century	A stone house, mainly roughcast, with a slate roof. There are two storeys, a main front of three bays, and a gabled rear wing with a rounded stair bay. Most of the windows are sashes, and there are some 20th-century casement windows.	II
Eastward Farmhouse and outbuilding 54.54575°N 2.75621°W	—	Late 17th or early 18th century	The farmhouse and outbuilding are in stone with slate roofs. The house has four bays and is in three and two storeys, with a crow-stepped south gable. The windows have chamfered surrounds and contain horizontally-sliding sash windows. On the front is a gabled porch and segmental-headed entrance. The outbuilding to the north has an initialled and dated lintel and windows of various types.	II*
Byre, Grange Farm; 54.55564°N 2.74206°W	—	Late 17th or early 18th century	The byre, since used for other purposes, is in limestone with a green slate roof. It has two storeys and two bays. The building contains a segmental-arched entrance and a doorway with a stone lintel. External steps lead up to a loft doorway flanked by two small openings with sills.	II
Low Knipe; 54.57144°N 2.74995°W	—	1707	A roughcast house with a slate roof, two storeys and five bays. On the front is an embattled entrance with an initialled and dated lintel. Most windows are casements, some are mullioned, some are sashes, and there is a fire window. Along the front is a partial hood mould, and at the rear is a two-storey outshut.	II
Moorahill Farmhouse and barn 54.55681°N 2.78420°W	—	1714	The farmhouse and barn are in stone with slate roofs. The house is roughcast, with two storeys, three bays, and sash windows. The barn to the south has two flat-arched entrances, ventilation slits, a crow-stepped gable, and a lean-to outshut.	II
High Howe, farm buildings and wall 54.56480°N 2.78920°W	—	1715	The farmhouse and farm buildings are in stone with slate roofs, and are arranged around a courtyard. The house is roughcast, and has two storeys and three bays. The windows are sashes, and on the front is a datestone. Attached to the house is a garden wall with iron railings and rusticated end piers. The features of the farm buildings include external steps, a crow-stepped gable, a segmental-headed barn entrance, and a pitching hole.	II
1 and 2 Bampton Grange; 54.55584°N 2.74090°W	—	Early 18th century (probable)	A pair of stone houses with a slate roof, in two storeys and five irregular bays. Some windows are mullioned, most are sashes, and some are horizontally-sliding sashes. On the front is a lean-to porch to the left, and a doorway to the right with a lintel that has an initialled and dated panel.	II
Former farmhouse, High Drybarrows; 54.54560°N 2.77757°W	—	Early 18th century (probable)	The farmhouse has since been used for other purposes. It is in stone with a slate roof, and has two storeys and four bays, with a hood mould between the floors. Most of the windows are sliding sashes, there is one casement window, a blocked fire window, and another blocked window. On the front is a gabled porch and a door with a fanlight.	II
High Rough Hill; 54.56514°N 2.77861°W	—	Early 18th century (probable)	A stone house with a slate roof, it has two storeys and four bays. The windows are mullioned with chamfered surrounds, and some of them are blocked, including two fire windows. On the northwest front is an outshut with a stair window and a porch.	II
Yew Tree House; 54.55690°N 2.75213°W	—	Early 18th century (probable)	A roughcast house with a slate roof that was extended later. It has two storeys and five bays, the right two bays being higher and later. At the rear is a gabled wing and an outshut. The windows have chamfered surrounds, and vary; some are sashes, some of those are horizontally-sliding, some windows are casements, and there is a fire window.	II
St Patrick's Church; 54.55532°N 2.74127°W		1726–28	The church is built on the site of a medieval church, and was restored in 1884–85 by C. J. Ferguson. It is in calciferous sandstone, partly rendered, on a chamfered plinth, and has quoins and a green slate roof with coped gables and cross finials. The church consists of a seven-bay nave, a two-bay chancel, and a slim west tower incorporating a porch. The doorway in the porch has a broken pediment, and the windows are round-headed, including a triple round-headed east window.	II*
Dennyhill; 54.54932°N 2.74846°W	—	1742	A roughcast house with a slate roof, two storeys and four bays. On the front is a gabled porch, sash windows, some with hood moulds, and a fire window, and at the rear the windows are varied. On the east side is a small lean-to outshut.	II
Dalton House and Christian Cottage; 54.55558°N 2.74150°W	—	Mid 18th century	Originally a farmhouse, later divided into two dwellings, it is stuccoed on a chamfered plinth and has a green slate roof. There are two storeys and three bays, the right bay forming part of Christian Cottage. On the front is a 20th-century trellised porch and a French window, the other windows are sashes, and the doorway and windows have stone surrounds.	II
Halfa Bridge; 54.55165°N 2.74652°W		Mid 18th century	The bridge carries a road over Haweswater Beck. It is in limestone and consists of two segmental arches. The central pier has splayed cutwaters, and rises to form a pedestrian refuge with solid parapets.	II
Barn, High Rough Hill; 54.56532°N 2.77880°W	—	18th century (probable)	The barn contains earlier material, and is in stone with a slate roof that has a coped gable. On the east side is an outshut, and on the south side are external steps leading up to a first floor door. Elsewhere there are buttresses, a mullioned window, ventilation slits, blocked openings, and inserted sliding doors.	II
Barn, Scar View Farm; 54.56668°N 2.75889°W	—	18th century (probable)	The barn is in stone with a slate roof. It has numerous entrances, including a segmental-headed barn entrance, and there are ventilation slits, a winnowing door, and an outshut.	II
Barn, Stanegarth; 54.55268°N 2.77892°W	—	18th century (probable)	The barn is in stone with sandstone dressings and it has a slate roof with crow-stepped gables. It has various entrances, some blocked, including a blocked winnowing door, ventilation holes and an owl hole.	II
Thompson Monument; 54.55522°N 2.74131°W	—	c. 1760	The monument is in the churchyard of St Patrick's Church, and consists of a chest tomb in ashlar stone. On the sides are ellipses between narrow rectangular panels, and on the ends are octagons between fluted panels. The plain top is inscribed with details of three members of the Thompson family.	II
Dawes House and stables 54.55564°N 2.73920°W	—	Mid or late 18th century	The house is roughcast with quoins, a string course, an eaves cornice, and a hipped green slate roof. There are two storeys and five bays. On the front is a 20th-century pedimented wooden porch, and the windows are sashes with stone surrounds. To the left is a two-bay stone stable containing a segmental-arched doorway.	II
Field Gate Farmhouse; 54.55602°N 2.73021°W		Late 18th century	The house is rendered with quoins and a green slate roof. There are two storeys, three bays, and a central doorway in an architrave with a fanlight, a frieze, and a cornice. The windows are sashes in stone surrounds, and at the rear is a stair window.	II
Scar View Farmhouse and cottage 54.56680°N 2.75879°W	—	1776	The farmhouse and the adjoining cottage, which dates from the 19th century, are mainly roughcast with slate roofs. There are two storeys and four bays, the right two bays being lower. The farmhouse has quoins and sash windows, the windows in the cottage being casements.	II
Church Bridge; 54.55505°N 2.74259°W		Late 18th or early 19th century	The bridge carries a road over the River Lowther. It is a narrow bridge in red sandstone, and consists of a single segmental arch with a slight hump. The bridge has rusticated voussoirs, a string course and a chamfered parapet.	II
Crown and Mitre Inn; 54.55564°N 2.74103°W		Late 18th or early 19th century	The public house is rendered on a chamfered plinth with a green slate ]roof. It has two storeys, three bays, and a two-storey two-bay extension at the rear. On the front is a prostyle Ionic porch with a balcony, and a door with a radial fanlight. A French window leads on to the balcony, and the other windows are sashes in stone surrounds.	II
Limekiln; 54.55600°N 2.75223°W	—	1848	The limekiln is in stone and built into the slope of a hill. It has rounded angles, and the fire hole has a lintel with a datestone.	II

== Notes and references ==
=== Sources ===
- Historic England, "Cross in Bampton Grange Cemetery, Bampton (1121903)", National Heritage List for England
- Historic England, "Low Rough Hill and adjoining bank barn, Bampton (1122008)", National Heritage List for England
- Historic England, "Dovecote approx 20 metres to south-east of Bampton Hall, Bampton (1145254)", National Heritage List for England
- Historic England, "Former yeoman's hall house, Bampton (1486560)", National Heritage List for England
- Historic England, "Knipe Hall and attached bank barn, Bampton (1145263)", National Heritage List for England
- Historic England, "Thornthwaite Hall and attached barn, Bampton (1326806)", National Heritage List for England
- Historic England, "Grange Farmhouse, Bampton (1145257)", National Heritage List for England
- Historic England, "Low Scarside and barn adjoining, Bampton (1337699)", National Heritage List for England
- Historic England, "Carhullan and barn, Bampton (1485219)", National Heritage List for England
- Historic England, "Low Crag, Bampton (1337641)", National Heritage List for England
- Historic England, "Stanegarth and attached outbuilding, Bampton (1145253)", National Heritage List for England
- Historic England, "Bampton Hall, Bampton (1121988)", National Heritage List for England
- Historic England, "Eastward Farmhouse and attached outbuilding, Bampton (1326843)", National Heritage List for England
- Historic England, "Byre south-east of Grange Farmhouse, Bampton (1121894)", National Heritage List for England
- Historic England, "Low Knipe, Bampton (1145262)", National Heritage List for England
- Historic England, "Moorahill Farmhouse and attached barn, Bampton (1326845)", National Heritage List for England
- Historic England, "High Howe with attached farm buildings and wall, Bampton (1326844)", National Heritage List for England
- Historic England, "Nos. 1 and 2, immediately to north-east of Crown and Mitre public house, Bampton (1121910)", National Heritage List for England
- Historic England, "Former farmhouse on west side of High Drybarrows, Bampton (1145250)", National Heritage List for England
- Historic England, "High Rough Hill, Bampton (1145251)", National Heritage List for England
- Historic England, "Yew Tree House, Bampton (1338563)", National Heritage List for England
- Historic England, "Church of St Patrick, Bampton (1145258)", National Heritage List for England
- Historic England, "Dennyhill, Bampton (1145260)", National Heritage List for England
- Historic England, "Dalton House and Christian Cottage, Bampton (1121879)", National Heritage List for England
- Historic England, "Halfa Bridge, Bampton (1121874)", National Heritage List for England
- Historic England, "Barn immediately to north of High Rough Hill, Bampton (1145252)", National Heritage List for England
- Historic England, "Barn immediately to south of Scar View Farmhouse, Bampton (1337665)", National Heritage List for England
- Historic England, "Bank barn immediately to north of Stanegarth, Bampton (1338524)", National Heritage List for England
- Historic England, "Thompson Monument approx 7 metres to south of St Patrick's Church, Bampton (1338586)", National Heritage List for England
- Historic England, "Dawes House and stables adjoining, Bampton (1145256)", National Heritage List for England
- Historic England, "Field Gate Farmhouse, Bampton (1326807)", National Heritage List for England
- Historic England, "Scar View Farmhouse and cottage, Bampton (1145261)", National Heritage List for England
- Historic England, "Church Bridge, Bampton (1145259)", National Heritage List for England
- Historic England, "Crown and Mitre Inn, Bampton (1326808)", National Heritage List for England
- Historic England, "Limekiln immediately to west of St Patrick's Well Public House, Bampton (1145255)", National Heritage List for England
- Historic England, Listed Buildings
- Hyde, Matthew; Pevsner, Nikolaus (2010) [1967], Cumbria, The Buildings of England, New Haven and London: Yale University Press, ISBN 978-0-300-12663-1
