= Listed buildings in Askham, Cumbria =

List of buildings

Askham is a civil parish in Westmorland and Furness, Cumbria, England. It contains 59 buildings that are recorded in the National Heritage List for England. Of these, one is listed at Grade I, the highest of the three grades, one is at Grade II*, the middle grade, and the others are at Grade II, the lowest grade. Apart from the villages of Askham and Helton, the parish is entirely rural. The most important building in the parish is the country house, Askham Hall; this and associated buildings are listed. Most of the other listed buildings are houses and associated structures, farmhouses and farm buildings; these are mainly situated in the villages. The other listed buildings include a church, monuments in the churchyard, public houses, a chapel, a bridge, three lime kilns, and a telephone kiosk.

== Key ==
Grade	Criteria
I	Buildings of exceptional interest, sometimes considered to be internationally important
II*	Particularly important buildings of more than special interest
II	Buildings of national importance and special interest

== Buildings ==
Name and location	Photograph	Date	Notes	Grade
Askham Hall; 54.60840°N 2.75037°W		14th century	A country house that originated as a pele tower with a north wing. A hall and a kitchen wing were added in the 16th century, followed by north and west ranges forming a courtyard. The tower has three storeys, a south front of five bays, and an embattled parapet with corner turrets. The entrance in the centre has an architrave, a rusticated surround, a pulvinated frieze and a broken segmental pediment, and the windows are cross-mullioned.	I
Scalegate Farmhouse and farm buildings 54.57556°N 2.79407°W	—	Early 17th century	The farmhouse and farm buildings are in stone and have slate roofs. The house has two storeys and two bays. The windows are mullioned with chamfered surrounds, and the central entrance has an architrave and a datestone. Above this is an opening in an inverted heart shape and with cable moulding. To the south is a cow house, a barn and an outshut, and to the north is an outbuilding with a large entrance and a casement window.	II
Hill Farmhouse; 54.60547°N 2.75897°W	—	1650	A roughcast stone farmhouse with a slate roof, two storeys and an L-shaped plan. On the south front is a three-light double-chamfered-mullioned window. Most of the other windows are casements. The entrance has a sunk triangular head, a dated lintel, and a hood mould.	II
Scalegate barn and smokehouse 54.57584°N 2.79337°W	—	17th century	The farm building is in stone, with quoins and a Westmorland slate roof. There are two storeys and an L-shaped plan. The openings include doorways, windows, a pitching door and an owl hole.	II
Town End House and barn 54.58958°N 2.75949°W	—	1667	The house and barn are in stone with slate roofs. The house is roughcast with two storeys and four bays. Some of the windows are mullioned, and some are sashes. The doorway has a chamfered surround, a segmental head, and a decorated and dated lintel. To the north is a barn with an L-shaped plan. This has various openings, and external steps lead up to a first floor loading door.	II
Clark Hill, Clark Hill Cottage and barn 54.60585°N 2.75488°W	—	1672	The buildings are in sandstone, the cottage and house being stuccoed, and they have green slate roofs. Clark Hill Cottage is the older, it has two storeys and three bays, a central doorway with a stone architrave, a decorative initialled and dated lintel, and a cornice. The windows are sashes. The barn to the left has a segmental-arched cart entrance and a ventilation slit. Clark Hill to the right dates from the 18th century, it has two storeys and four bays, two doors, one with a fanlight, and most of the windows are sashes.	II
Helton Head Farmhouse and barns 54.58884°N 2.77009°W		Late 17th century	The farmhouse and barns are in stone with slate roofs. The house is roughcast, it has two storeys, four bays, and a gabled rear wing, and the windows are sashes. To the left is a two-storey barn with external steps leading up to a first floor doorway, and to the rear is a later barn with quoins, a hipped roof, and square ventilation holes.	II
Hill Top Cottage; 54.60544°N 2.75459°W		Late 17th century	A stone house on a projecting boulder plinth, with a green slate roof. It has two storeys, two bays, and a rear outshut. The doorway has a chamfered surround. To the right is a three-light mullioned window; the mullions from the other windows have been removed, and above the door is a blocked window.	II
Laburnum Cottage; 54.60519°N 2.75831°W	—	Late 17th century (probable)	A house in roughcast stone with a green slate roof, two storeys and three bays. In the ground floor are a doorway, a casement window, and a sash window in a moulded architrave. In the upper floor are two sash windows with a two-light mullioned window with a chamfered surround between. At the rear of the house is a lean-to outshut and a porch.	II
Widewath Farmhouse and farm buildings 54.58202°N 2.77407°W	—	Late 17th century	The farmhouse and outbuildings are in stone with slate roofs. The house is rendered with quoins, two storeys, four bays, and a gabled rear wing. Some windows are mullioned and some are sashes. The doorway has a gabled porch, rusticated jambs, and a pedimented gable with an initialled and dated cartouche. To the right is a roughcast barn and a smaller outbuilding further to the right, and to the left is another barn with various openings.	II
Terrace walls and steps, Askham Hall; 54.60787°N 2.74989°W	—	17th or 18th century (probable)	Two walls, about 21.5 metres (71 ft) long, the south wall being lower, with steps between them, all in ashlar stone. The upper wall has a cornice, and the steps lead to the lower wall that has a gate with flanking buttresses.	II
Gate piers, Askham Hall; 54.60729°N 2.75054°W	—	Late 17th or 18th century (probable)	The gate piers are at the entrance to the drive to the hall. They are in ashlar, they are square and rusticated, and have large caps with ball finials. Between them is a pair of wooden gates.	II
Nook Cottage; 54.60538°N 2.75740°W	—	Late 17th or 18th century (probable)	A stone house with two low storeys and two bays, a single-storey wing to the right, and a 20th-century garage beyond that. In the main block is a plank door and a sash window. with two casement windows above. In the wing is a doorway and three windows.	II
Keld Head Farmhouse and barn 54.60592°N 2.75749°W	—	1704	The farmhouse and barn are in stone with slate roofs. The house is roughcast, with two storeys and five bays. On the front is a gabled porch with a side entrance and an inner doorway with a dated lintel. The windows are square with chamfered surrounds and casements. At the rear is a gabled wing containing sash windows, and a lean-to outshut with a two-light mullioned window. To the right of the house is a barn dated 1814 that has three entrances and two windows, a winnowing door with a dated lintel, and square ventilation holes.	II
4 Park View and outbuilding 54.60715°N 2.75253°W	—	1712	Originally two houses, later combined into one dwelling, the house and outbuilding to the right are in stone with slate roofs. The house is stuccoed with two storeys and five bays, the second and third bays being higher. The windows vary, most are casements, and there is one horizontally-sliding sash window. In the outbuilding is a segmental pointed entrance and two windows, and there is a wing at the rear.	II
Curlew Cottage; 54.60587°N 2.75827°W	—	1724	A house in roughcast stone with a slate roof, it has two storeys and six bays. The windows vary, and all contain casements. On the front are a door and a garage door.	II
Fell Gate Farmhouse and former barn 54.59087°N 2.76197°W	—	Early 18th century	The building has been converted into residential use. It is in limestone with a green slate roof. The house has two storeys, two bays, and mullioned windows. The barn to the right projects slightly, it has three bays, and contains plank doors, a garage doorway, casement windows, and loft doors.	II
Hunters Cottage; 54.59088°N 2.76128°W	—	Early 18th century	A stone house with a green slate roof, in two storeys and two bays, and with a two-storey single-bay extension to the left. Some of the windows are mullioned, and some are casements. On the side facing the road is a gabled porch.	II
Low Side; 54.60658°N 2.75169°W	—	Early 18th century	A house with rendered walls and a green slate roof, in two storeys and two bays. On the front is a central gabled porch with a side entrance, casement windows in stone surrounds, and a fire window.	II
Lowside Farmhouse and barn 54.58986°N 2.75933°W	—	Early 18th century	The house and barn are in stone with slate roofs. The house is roughcast and has two storeys and three bays. The windows are sashes, one of which is mullioned, and the doorway has a chamfered surround. A small block connects the house to the barn, which has outshuts, and contains segmental-headed entrances, sash windows, and a re-set datestone. (Note: Street View in April 2010 shows that the barn has been converted for domestic use.)	II
Midtown Cottage, house adjoining and former stable 54.60637°N 2.75233°W	—	Early 18th century	The buildings are in stone with a green slate roof and are in two storeys. Midtown house has three bays, a plank door, some sash and some casement windows, and a fire window. The house to the right has two bays, a 20th-century door and sash windows, and the former stable to the right, partly converted for residential use, has double plank doors and sash windows.	II
Pear Tree Cottage and barn 54.60726°N 2.75214°W	—	Early 18th century	The farmhouse and barn are in stone with a green slate roof. The house has two storeys and two bays, and to the left is a single-bay barn. There is a central doorway flanked by sash windows, and in the upper floor are casement windows. The barn contains a large narrow flat-headed doorway.	II
School Bank Cottage and barn 54.60651°N 2.75373°W	—	Early 18th century	A farmhouse with a barn to the left in limestone with a green slate roof. The house has two storeys, two bays, a central door in a stone surround, and mullioned windows. The barn has three bays, two doors, a segmental-arched cart entrance, and a casement window.	II
Askham Hall Farmhouse, barns and stables 54.60672°N 2.75145°W	—	18th century	The farmhouse and outbuildings are rendered with green slate roofs. The house has two storeys and two bays, to the right is a two-bay barn, and to the left are a barn and stables with an L-shaped plan. The house has a central door, and most of the windows are sashes, all in plain stone surrounds. The right barn has a segmental-headed cart entrance, a small loft door, and a gabled extension to the front. In the outbuildings to the left are plank doors and casement windows.	II
Barn, Askham Hall; 54.60848°N 2.75178°W	—	18th century (probable)	The barn is in stone with a slate roof. In the west front is an entrance with a straight head flanked by two segmental-headed openings. On the north side is a lean-to, and along the east front is a continuous outshut. In this front is a two-light mullioned window.	II
Brook Villa and stable 54.60593°N 2.75668°W	—	Mid 18th century	The former farmhouse and stable are in calciferous sandstone and have green slate roofs. The house has two storeys and two bays, with a central door and casement windows in stone surrounds. The stable, of a later date, is to the right and recessed. It has two storeys, a plank door, a casement window, and ventilation slits on two levels.	II
Hall Cottage and wall 54.60711°N 2.75027°W	—	18th century	Probably originally two dwellings, the house is roughcast with a green slate roof, hipped at the left end. There are two storeys and five bays. The windows in the first two bays are horizontally-sliding sashes and in the other bays they are sashes. There are two doors, the door in the first bay having a fanlight. In front of the house on three sides of the garden is a wall with iron railings and a gate.	II
The Hollies; 54.60526°N 2.75890°W	—	Mid 18th century (probable)	A house that was altered in 1800, it is in stone with a green slate roof, and has two storeys and two bays. The central doorway has a stone surround incorporating a date roundel. In the left bay the windows are sashes in stone surrounds, and in the right bay they are mullioned and have three lights.	II
Holly House and barn 54.60599°N 2.75623°W	—	Mid 18th century	The house and barn are in sandstone with green slate roofs. The house is rendered, and has two storeys and two bays. The central doorway has a stone architrave, a plain frieze and a cornice, and the windows are sashes with plain surrounds. To the right is a four-bay barn with a segmental-headed cart entrance, plank doors, a loft door, casement windows, and ventilation slits. (Note: Street View in April 2010 shows that the barn has been converted for use as a village shop and post office.)	II
Lowther Outdoor Activities Centre with barn 54.60621°N 2.75435°W	—	Mid 18th century	The building is in stone, partly roughcast and partly rendered, and has a green slate roof. There are two storeys, the original part of the house has three bays with a two-bay extension to the left, a two bay former stable to the left of that, and a three-bay barn to the right. The original part has a doorway with a fanlight and 20th-century casement windows, the extension contains sash windows, the former stable has a door and a cart entrance, and the barn has a central cart entrance flanked by plank doors.	II
Sycamore Cottage and barn 54.60553°N 2.75437°W	—	18th century	The house and barn are in stone, partly roughcast, with slate roofs. The house has two storeys and three bays, the central bay protruding forward and gabled. The central bay contains a door above which is a round-headed window. The other windows are sashes. At the rear is a gabled extension leading top the barn, which has an elliptical-headed entrance.	II
The Queen's Head Inn; 54.60598°N 2.75549°W		1762	Originally two houses, later converted into a public house, it is in roughcast limestone, with quoins and a green slate roof. There are two storeys, a front of six bays, a two-storey extension at the rear, and a single-storey lean-to extension on the left. There is a central entrance with a gabled wooden porch. The windows are sashes, one with a dated lintel.	II
1, 2 and 3 School Hill, and Rose Cottage; 54.60666°N 2.75342°W		1763	A cottage and a row of three houses, the cottage being the older, and the houses dated 1819. They are all rendered with green slate roofs, sash windows, and doors with plain surrounds. The cottage is on a projecting boulder plinth, it has two storeys and two bays. The houses have three storeys and one bay each.	II
Scales Farmhouse and farm buildings 54.57377°N 2.79464°W	—	1763	The farmhouse and outbuildings are in stone with slate roofs. The house has two storeys, two bays, and sash windows. At the rear is an outshut with a mullioned and transomed window. To the right is a barn with various openings, and to the left the outbuildings form a projecting wing.	II
Chest tomb (east); 54.60731°N 2.74756°W	—	Mid to late 18th century	The chest tomb is to the east of the path in the churchyard of St Peter's Church. It is in ashlar stone, and has fluted pilaster strips on the angles and the long sides. On the ends are carved relief skulls, and the top slab has a moulded edge.	II
Chest tomb (west); 54.60740°N 2.74766°W	—	Mid to late 18th century	The chest tomb is to the west of the path in the churchyard of St Peter's Church. It is in ashlar stone, and has shaped incised panels on the sides. The top slab has a moulded edge and an inscription that is illegible.	II
Askham Gate and barn 54.60547°N 2.75520°W	—	Late 18th century	The farmhouse is stuccoed on a chamfered plinth, and has quoins and a green slate roof. There are two storeys and three bays, with a recessed single bay extension on the left. The doorway in the main part has a stone surround, and the doorway in the extension has a rusticated surround and a keyed lintel. The barn to the right is L-shaped, in mixed limestone and sandstone, with a roof of Welsh slate. The wall joining it to the house incorporates a re-used 17th-century doorway. In the barn there are plank doors, casement windows, a loft entrance, and a segmental-arched cart entrance.	II
Brookside; 54.60533°N 2.75800°W	—	Late 18th century	A roughcast house with quoins and a green slate roof. There are two storeys and two bays. The doorway and sash windows have plain surrounds.	II
Lintzford; 54.59189°N 2.75962°W	—	Late 18th century	A stone house with green slate roof, it has two storeys and two bays. The door and windows, which are sashes, have stone surrounds.	II
Sawmill Cottage; 54.60643°N 2.75208°W	—	Late 18th century	A house mainly in limestone with some sandstone blocks, quoins, sandstone dressings, and a green slate roof. There are two storeys, three bays, and a projecting single-bay extension to the right. The doorway and casement windows have plain stone surrounds.	II
Former Smithy; 54.60655°N 2.75186°W	—	Late 18th century (probable)	The former smithy is in mixed limestone and cobble and has a green slate roof. It has one storey and two bays, and at the right end is a lean-to extension. On the front is a segmental-arched opening and a 20th-century window. The gable end facing the road contains a blocked doorway.	II
Keldside and Keld Cottage; 54.60585°N 2.75799°W	—	1777	A pair of stone houses with a green slate roof. They have two storeys, Kelside has three bays, and Keld Cottage has two. Most of the windows are casements in stone surrounds. Above the door of Keld Cottage is a dated lintel, and to the right is a three-light mullioned window.	II
Mounsey monument 54.60735°N 2.74756°W	—	1777	The monument is in the churchyard of St Peter's Church. It is in ashlar stone, and has flat pilasters and an open segmental pediment. On the monument is an inscribed octagonal copper plate.	II
Bowman monument 54.60727°N 2.74754°W	—	1799	The monument is in the churchyard of St Peter's Church. It consists of an ashlar headstone with angle pilasters and a swan-necked pediment. On the headstone are copper plates inscribed with details of the Bowman family.	II
North Barn, Helton Head; 54.58873°N 2.76973°W	—	Late 18th to early 19th century	The barn is in limestone with some sandstone, quoins, and a Welsh slate roof. There is a single storey, and the openings include doorways with quoined surrounds, slit vents, a rectangular opening, and an owl hole in the gable apex.	II
Hill Top; 54.60558°N 2.75424°W	—	Late 18th or early 19th century (probable)	A roughcast stone house with a slate roof, two storeys and two bays, and a gabled wing at the rear. It has a central doorway and sash windows.	II
Punch Bowl Hotel Public House; 54.60701°N 2.75044°W		Late 18th or early 19th century	The public house is in roughcast stone with a green slate roof. There are two storeys and five bays, the left two bays being taller. On the front is a gabled porch, and the windows are sashes. There is a small gabled extension on the right side.	II
Wellington House and barn 54.60554°N 2.75660°W	—	Late 18th or early 19th century	The farmhouse and barn are in mixed red sandstone and calciferous sandstone and have green slate roofs. The house is rendered, with quoins, two storeys and three bays. The central doorway has a pediment, and the windows are sashes, all with stone surrounds. To the left is a lower barn dated 1811, with three bays, a segmental-headed entrance and a dated keystone.	II
Midtown Farmhouse; 54.60625°N 2.75257°W	—	1813	A rendered house with a green slate roof, it has two storeys and two bays, with a single-bay extension to the right. The windows are sashes. Above the door is an initialled and dated panel.	II
1, 2 and 3 West View and barn 54.60731°N 2.75143°W	—	Early 19th century	A row of three houses and a former barn in a row, rendered, and with a green slate roof. They have two storeys, and each house and the barn have two bays. All the houses have a central doorway and sash windows, all in stone surrounds. In the barn are a plank door, a sash window, and a segmental-arched doorway.	II
Croft House; 54.60599°N 2.75300°W		Early 19th century	A stuccoed house with quoins, eaves modillions, and a green slate roof. There are two storeys and three bays. In the centre is a prostyle Tuscan porch and a door with a fanlight. The windows are sashes in raised stone surrounds, the window above the door being larger than the others.	II
2 and 3 Park View; 54.60696°N 2.75287°W	—	1832	A pair of rendered houses with a green slate roof, in two storeys and five bays. The windows in No. 2 are sashes, and in No. 3 they are a mix of sashes and casements; all have plain stone surrounds. Above the door of No. 2 is an initialled and dated plaque. The left return of No, 2 contains a 20th-century bay window.	II
St Peter's Church; 54.60759°N 2.74748°W		1832–33	The church was designed by Robert Smirke and stands on the site of a medieval church, incorporating some of its features. It is in calciferous sandstone on a chamfered plinth, with quoins, an eaves cornice, and has a green slate roof with coped gables and cross finials. The church consists of a nave and chancel, a south aisle, a north transept, and a southwest tower. The doorway, windows and bell openings are round-headed. Inside the church is a west gallery.	II*
Limekiln at NY 500 242; 54.61073°N 2.77511°W	—	19th century (probable)	The limekiln is in dressed stone, it has a rectangular plan and is built into the slope of a hill. The northwest face is set into cutting, and has natural rock sides. There is a segmental-arched fire hole with two hearths inside.	II
Limekiln at NY 500 243; 54.61188°N 2.76205°W	—	19th century (probable)	The limekiln is in dressed stone, it has a rectangular plan and is built into the slope of a hill. In the east face is a segmental-arched fire hole.	II
Limekiln at NY 511 228; 54.59807°N 2.75813°W	—	19th century (probable)	The limekiln has a square plan and is built into the slope of a hill. In the east face is a segmental-arched fire hole.	II
Helton Methodist Chapel; 54.59218°N 2.75891°W		1857	The chapel is in limestone, with quoins and a Welsh slate roof. It has a single storey, two bays, and a recessed porch. The paired windows have Tudor arched heads, and the entrance has a pointed segmental head and a plank door with studs and ornamental hinges.	II
Askham Bridge; 54.60805°N 2.74703°W		1897	The bridge carries a road over the River Lowther. It is in pink sandstone ashlar, and consists of a single segmental arch. The bridge has recessed voussoirs, a string course, and solid parapets with chamfered coping. The abutments have stepped buttresses supporting four pedestrian refuges, and on the parapets are inscribed stones.	II
Telephone kiosk 54.60572°N 2.75556°W	—	1935	A K6 type telephone kiosk, designed by Giles Gilbert Scott. Constructed in cast iron with a square plan and a dome, it has three unperforated crowns in the top panels.	II

== Notes and references ==
=== Sources ===
- Historic England, "Askham Hall (1119606)", National Heritage List for England
- Historic England, "Scalegate Farmhouse and attached farm buildings, Askham (1326811)", National Heritage List for England
- Historic England, "Hill Farmhouse, Askham (1120834)", National Heritage List for England
- Historic England, "Scalegate barn and smokehouse, Askham (1493451)", National Heritage List for England
- Historic England, "Town End House and attached barn, Askham (1145249)", National Heritage List for England
- Historic England, "Clark Hill and Clark Hill Cottage and barn adjoining, Askham (1121534)", National Heritage List for England
- Historic England, "Helton Head Farmhouse and attached barns, Askham (1326841)", National Heritage List for England
- Historic England, "Hill Top Cottage, Askham (1145288)", National Heritage List for England
- Historic England, "Laburnum Cottage, Askham (1323144)", National Heritage List for England
- Historic England, "Widewath Farmhouse and attached farm buildings, Askham (1145270)", National Heritage List for England
- Historic England, "Terrace walls and steps to south of Askham Hall (1145274)", National Heritage List for England
- Historic England, "Gatepiers to Askham Hall (1326815)", National Heritage List for England
- Historic England, "Nook Cottage, Askham (1323145)", National Heritage List for England
- Historic England, "Keld Head Farmhouse and attached barn, Askham (1326816)", National Heritage List for England
- Historic England, "No. 4 Park View with outbuilding, Askham (1120789)", National Heritage List for England
- Historic England, "Curlew Cottage, Askham (1145275)", National Heritage List for England
- Historic England, "Fell Gate Farmhouse and former barn adjoining, Askham (1326840)", National Heritage List for England
- Historic England, "Hunters Cottage, Askham (1145248)", National Heritage List for England
- Historic England, "Low Side, Askham (1121132)", National Heritage List for England
- Historic England, "Lowside Farmhouse and attached barn, Askham (1326842)", National Heritage List for England
- Historic England, "Midtown Cottage and house adjoining with former stable, Askham (1121544)", National Heritage List for England
- Historic England, "Pear Tree Cottage and barn adjoining, Askham (1145282)", National Heritage List for England
- Historic England, "School Bank Cottage and barn adjoining, Askham (1120811)", National Heritage List for England
- Historic England, "Askham Hall Farmhouse and barns/stables adjoining, Askham (1145284)", National Heritage List for England
- Historic England, "Barn to west of Askham Hall (1119614)", National Heritage List for England
- Historic England, "Brook Villa and stable adjoining, Askham (1120869)", National Heritage List for England
- Historic England, "Hall Cottage and front garden wall, Askham (1145283)", National Heritage List for England
- Historic England, "The Hollies, Askham (1326818)", National Heritage List for England
- Historic England, "Holly House and barn adjoining, Askham (1145276)", National Heritage List for England
- Historic England, "Lowther Outdoor Activities Centre with barn adjoining, Askham (1145279)", National Heritage List for England
- Historic England, "Sycamore Cottage and attached barn, Askham (1322815)", National Heritage List for England
- Historic England, "Nos. 1, 2 and 3 School Hill and Rose Cottage, Askham (1145280)", National Heritage List for England
- Historic England, "The Queen's Head Inn, Askham (1120846)", National Heritage List for England
- Historic England, "Scales Farmhouse and attached farm buildings, Askham (1145269)", National Heritage List for England
- Historic England, "Chest tomb on east side of path approximately 27.5 metres to south of Church of St Peter, Askham (1145273)", National Heritage List for England
- Historic England, "Chest tomb on west side of path approximately 24.5 metres to south of Church of St Peter, Askham (1326813)", National Heritage List for England
- Historic England, "Askham Gate and barn adjoining, Askham (1120852)", National Heritage List for England
- Historic England, "Brookside, Askham (1145278)", National Heritage List for England
- Historic England, "Lintzford, Askham (1122683)", National Heritage List for England
- Historic England, "Sawmill Cottage, Askham (1145286)", National Heritage List for England
- Historic England, "Former Smithy to east of Sawmill Cottage, Askham (1145285)", National Heritage List for England
- Historic England, "Keldside and Keld Cottage, Askham (1323106)", National Heritage List for England
- Historic England, "Mounsey monument to east of path approximately 15 metres to south of Church of St Peter, Askham (1145272)", National Heritage List for England
- Historic England, "Bowman monument on east side of path approximately 28 metres to south of Church of St Peter, Askham (1326814)", National Heritage List for England
- Historic England, "North Barn south of Helton Head, Askham (1495917)", National Heritage List for England
- Historic England, "Hill Top, Askham (1326819)", National Heritage List for England
- Historic England, "Punch Bowl Hotel Public House, Askham (1323015)", National Heritage List for England
- Historic England, "Wellington House, Askham (1326817)", National Heritage List for England
- Historic England, "Midtown Farmhouse, Askham (1145287)", National Heritage List for England
- Historic England, "Nos. 1, 2 and 3 West View and former barn adjoining, Askham (1322984)", National Heritage List for England
- Historic England, "Croft House, Askham (1322786)", National Heritage List for England
- Historic England, "Nos. 2 and 3 Park View, Askham (1145281)", National Heritage List for England
- Historic England, "Church of St Peter, Askham (1145271)", National Heritage List for England
- Historic England, "Limekiln at NY 500 242, Askham (1326790)", National Heritage List for England
- Historic England, "Limekiln at NY 500 243, Askham (1145308)", National Heritage List for England
- Historic England, "Limekiln at NY 511 228, Askham (1145309)", National Heritage List for England
- Historic England, "Helton Methodist Chapel, Askham (1326820)", National Heritage List for England
- Historic England, "Askham Bridge, Askham (1326812)", National Heritage List for England
- Historic England, "K6 Telephone Kiosk opposite Post Office, Askham (1145277)", National Heritage List for England
- Historic England, Listed Buildings
- Hyde, Matthew; Pevsner, Nikolaus (2010) [1967], Cumbria, The Buildings of England, New Haven and London: Yale University Press, ISBN 978-0-300-12663-1
