= Mary Eleanor Noble =

1907 county councillor

Mary Eleanor Noble (1845 – 1925) was a local politician and parish historian who, according to Hollis, was the first woman in England to be a county councillor.

She was born 4 April 1845 in Bampton, Westmorland, the elder of two daughters of landowner William Noble and his wife Jane, née Atkinson. She and her sister Elizabeth lived with their parents and, as major landowners, contributed to local agricultural, church and village concerns.

Noble's politics were conservative, being a member of the Primrose League. In 1894 she was the inaugural vice-chair of the newly formed Bampton Parish Council. In 1907, she was elected unopposed to Westmorland County Council, representing Askham and Bampton.

Education was one of her priorities: she sat on the education committee of Westmorland County Council, and she and Elizabeth paid for schools to be built or rebuilt at Roughill, Bampton and Measand. Her other building projects included the West Ward workhouse in Shap and St Patrick's church hall in Bampton.

A keen local historian, Noble contributed papers to the Westmorland Antiquarian and Archaeological Society and was elected to its council in 1918. She transcribed and published the parish registers for Bampton (1897), Askham (1904) and Shap (1912) along with a History of the Parish of Bampton (1901).

She died at Beckfoot, the home she shared with her sister, on 6 February 1925.
