= Keld, Cumbria =

Hamlet in Cumbria, England

Coordinates: 54.523°N 2.691°W

Keld
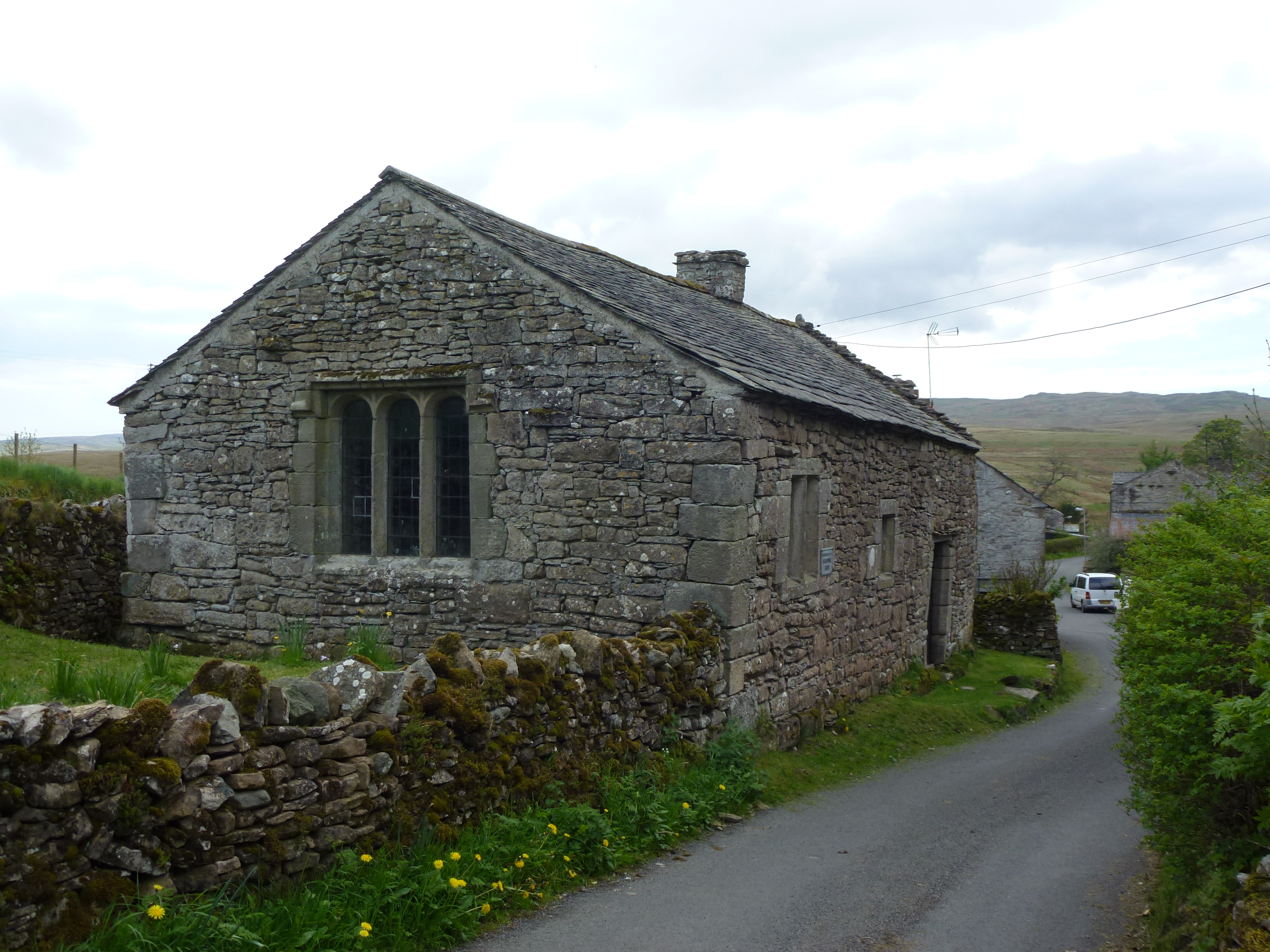
- Keld Chapel

- Location in Eden, Cumbria Location within Cumbria
- OS grid reference: NY552144
- Civil parish: Shap
- Unitary authority: Westmorland and Furness
- Ceremonial county: Cumbria
- Region: North West
- Country: England
- Sovereign state: United Kingdom
- Post town: PENRITH
- Postcode district: CA10
- Dialling code: 017683
- Police: Cumbria
- Fire: Cumbria
- Ambulance: North West
- UK Parliament: Westmorland and Lonsdale

Keld (or Keilde) is a hamlet in the English county of Cumbria. It lies within the civil parish of Shap.

On the banks of the River Lowther it is a mile southwest of Shap and falls within that village's civil parish, Shap Abbey is nearby. Keld's medieval chapel (right) is noted for its unusual simplicity.

== See also ==
- Listed buildings in Shap
