= Helton, Cumbria =

Village in Cumbria, England

Coordinates: 54.592°N 2.759°W

Helton
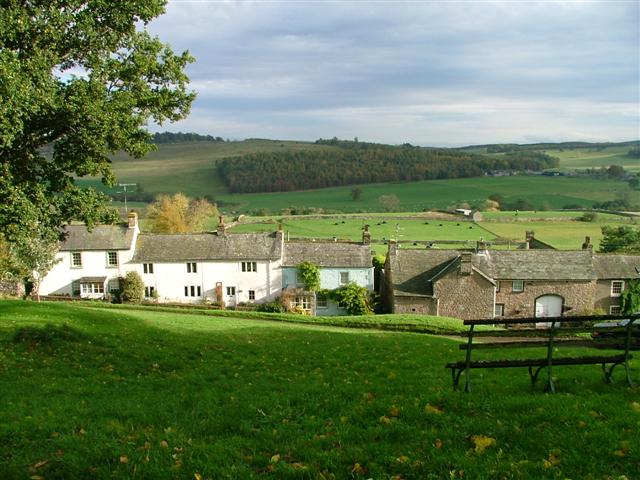
- Helton Village Green

- Location in Eden, Cumbria Location within Cumbria
- OS grid reference: NY509221
- Civil parish: Askham
- Unitary authority: Westmorland and Furness
- Ceremonial county: Cumbria
- Region: North West
- Country: England
- Sovereign state: United Kingdom
- Post town: PENRITH
- Postcode district: CA10
- Dialling code: 01931
- Police: Cumbria
- Fire: Cumbria
- Ambulance: North West
- UK Parliament: Westmorland and Lonsdale

Helton is a village in the Westmorland and Furness district, in the English county of Cumbria. It is about a mile south of the village of Askham. Circa 1870, it had a population of 180 as recorded in the Imperial Gazetteer of England and Wales. The village is situated on a steep slope running down from the limestone fells to the flood plain of the River Lowther. Helton is on Wideworth Farm Road, which forms part of the road north to Penrith, and south towards Bampton. A Wesleyan chapel was built in Helton in c.1857 and is a Grade II listed building, now converted for residential use .

== Notable Former Residents ==
Mark Eden (Chief Engineer, Ford).

== See also ==
- Listed buildings in Askham, Cumbria
