= Bampton Grange =

Village in Cumbria, England

Coordinates: 54.55°N 2.74°W

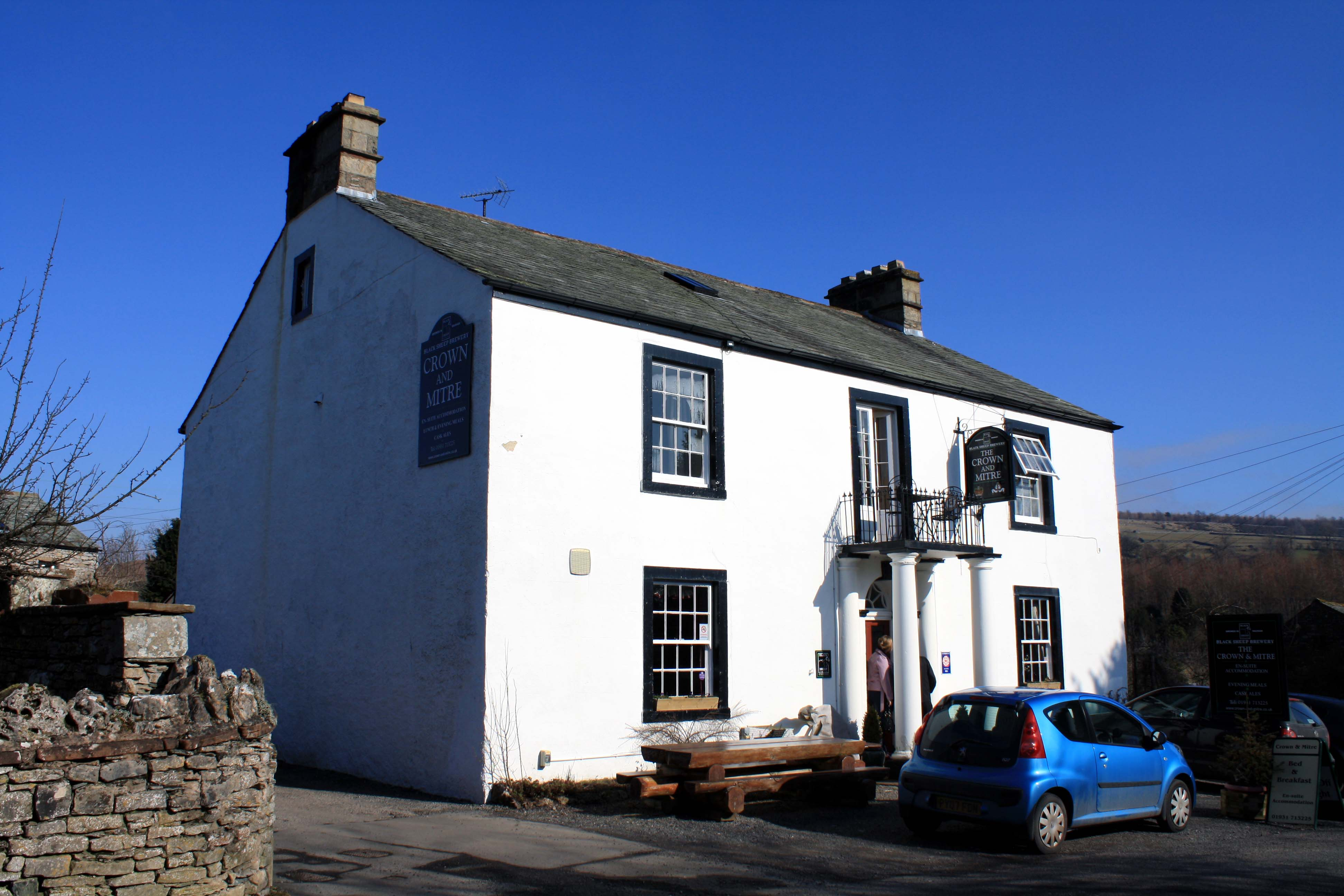
- The Crown and Mitre public house, Bampton Grange

- Location in Eden, Cumbria Location within Cumbria
- OS grid reference: NY5218
- Civil parish: Bampton
- Unitary authority: Westmorland and Furness
- Ceremonial county: Cumbria
- Region: North West
- Country: England
- Sovereign state: United Kingdom
- Post town: PENRITH
- Postcode district: CA10
- Dialling code: 01931
- Police: Cumbria
- Fire: Cumbria
- Ambulance: North West
- UK Parliament: Westmorland and Lonsdale

Bampton Grange is a village in Cumbria, England.

The Haweswater Beck flows eastward, just north of Firth Woods, and then turns north to join the River Lowther between Bampton and Bampton Grange.

== See also ==
- Listed buildings in Bampton, Cumbria
