= Listed buildings in Shap =

Shap is a civil parish in Westmorland and Furness, Cumbria, England. It contains 31 listed buildings that are recorded in the National Heritage List for England. Of these, one is listed at Grade II*, the middle of the three grades, and the others are at Grade II, the lowest grade. The parish contains the village of Shap, the hamlet of Keld, and the surrounding countryside. Most of the listed buildings are houses and associated structures, farmhouses and farm buildings. The other listed buildings include a church and items in the churchyard, a chapel, a hotel, a former market hall, a war memorial, and four mileposts.

== Key ==
Grade	Criteria
II*	Particularly important buildings of more than special interest
II	Buildings of national importance and special interest

== Buildings ==
Name and location	Photograph	Date	Notes	Grade
St Michael's Church; 54.53146°N 2.67543°W		12th century (probable)	The oldest part of the church is the south arcade, the aisle was added in the 13th century, the chancel was rebuilt in 1765, the tower was rebuilt in 1828, and much of the body of the church was rebuilt in 1897–98. The church is built in stone on a chamfered plinth, and has stepped buttresses, and slate roofs with stone copings and apex crosses. It consists of a nave, a south aisle, a chancel with a south chapel and north vestry, and a west tower. The tower has two stages, a west doorway with a four-centred head, and an embattled parapet.	II
Keld Chapel; 54.52392°N 2.69112°W		Late 16th century	The chapel was used as a dwelling between the 17th and 19th century. It is built in limestone with a roof of Westmorland slate, and has a two-cell plan. At the east end is a re-used three-light late Perpendicular style with a hood mould. Elsewhere the windows have flat heads and one or two lights, and the doorway has chamfered jambs and a later lintel. The chapel, its churchyard and wall are a Scheduled Monument.	II
Greyhound Hotel, milestone and mounting block 54.52158°N 2.67109°W		1680	Originally a coaching inn, and later a hotel, it is in stone on a plinth, and has a slate roof with a stone ridge. It was extended in 1696, and further extended in 1703. There are two storeys, a front of seven bays, and a rear wing. On the front is a flat-roofed porch with cast iron columns, and on the roof is a sculpture of a recumbent greyhound. The windows are sashes in stone surrounds, and in the extension is a segmental-headed carriage arch. To the right of the door is a milestone indicating the distances in miles to Kendal and Penrith, and to the right of the carriage arch is a mounting block.	II
Market Hall; 54.52973°N 2.67694°W		c. 1690	The market hall, later used for other purposes, is in stone with quoins and a hipped slate roof with stone ridges. There are two low storeys and three bays on each front. On the east and south sides is an arcade with semicircular arches. On the east side of the roof is a gabled projection with a rectangular recess at the front and louvred sides.	II*
The Hermitage; 54.53272°N 2.67885°W	—	1691	A pebbledashed house with a slate roof, a stone ridge and two storeys. It has a U-shaped plan with a central block of four bays flanked by single-bay wings. The doorway has an architrave and an embattled lintel, and above it is a dated panel in a frame with a cornice. The windows in the main block are sashes over which are continuous hood moulds. The wings have varied windows, decorative bargeboards with finials and pendants, and a weathervane on the north wing.	II
Plane Trees and adjoining houses 54.52553°N 2.67388°W	—	1691	Originally one house, later subdivided, it is pebbledashed with an eaves cornice and a slate roof with stone coping at the east end. There are two storeys and eight bays. Above the original door is a dated and initialled lintel. The windows are a mix of sashes, some of which are horizontally sliding, and casements.	II
Green Farmhouse, cottage, barn and byre range, and wall 54.52216°N 2.67275°W	—	1703	The farmhouse and cottage have been combined into a single dwelling; they are stuccoed and have a slate roof with stone coping at the north end. There are two storeys, the house had a symmetrical front of five bays, and the cottage to the left had two bays. Above the doorway is a bracketed hood, and the windows are sashes. The range of farm buildings to the right are in stone with quoins and a roof of corrugated asbestos, hipped to the south. There are nine bays, doors, windows, and ventilation slits. In front of the house is a stone wall about 3 feet (0.91 m) high with segmental coping, and gate piers with pyramidal caps.	II
New Ing Farmhouse; 54.53358°N 2.67789°W	—	18th century (probable)	Built as a coaching inn, and later converted into a farmhouse, it is stucco|ed and has a slate roof with a stone ridge. There are three storeys, four bays and a gabled porch. All the windows are replacement casements in stone surrounds.	II
Barn to south of Thornship farmhouse 54.52054°N 2.68683°W	—	18th century (probable)	The barn is in rendered stone with quoins, and has a slate roof with a crow-stepped east gable and a stone ridge. There is a single tall storey and five bays. In the barn is a segmental-headed cart entrance, and two rows of ventilation slits.	II
Keld Farmhouse; 54.52338°N 2.69217°W	—	1763	A stone farmhouse that has a slate roof with stone coping at the west end. It has two storeys and a symmetrical front of three bays. Above the central doorway is an inscribed and dated frieze and a cornice, and the windows are 20th-century casements in stone surrounds.	II
Coach House, New Ing Farmhouse; 54.53367°N 2.67802°W	—	Mid to late 18th century (probable)	The coach house is in stone with quoins, and has a hipped slate roof. There are two low storeys, two bays, a carriage arch and steps leading up to a loft door.	II
Thornship Farmhouse and byre 54.52068°N 2.68706°W	—	1760s	The farmhouse and byre are in stone and have a slate roof with a stone ridge, and two storeys. The house has four bays, a rear range, a plank door, and segmental-headed windows, one of which is a casement and the others are fixed. The byre has three bays, a door, a window, and a loft door.	II
1 and 2 The Rookery and outbuildings 54.53350°N 2.67955°W	—	Late 18th century (probable)	Originally one house, later subdivided and outbuildings incorporated. It is in stone with quoins and a slate roof. There are two storeys, No. 1 has five bays, and No. 2 has two. The windows are sashes, there is a segmental-headed wagon arch, and a semicircular-headed stair window at the rear. All the openings have stone surrounds.	II
Croft House; 54.52581°N 2.67504°W	—	Late 18th century (probable)	A stone house with quoins and a slate roof with a stone ridge. It has two storeys and a symmetrical front of three bays. The central doorway and sash windows have stone surrounds.	II
Cross Cottage, Cross Farmhouse, and barn/byre range 54.52964°N 2.67721°W	—	Late 18th century (probable)	The cottage and farmhouse are pebbledashed, the farm buildings are in stone with quoins, and all have slate roofs. There are two storeys and a T-shaped plan. The cottage has three bays, the farmhouse has two bays, and the windows are sashes in stone surrounds. The barn and byre range have a crow-steeped gable, four bays, doors, windows and a loft door.	II
Green House with pavilions 54.52365°N 2.67495°W	—	Late 18th to early 19th century	The house and the flanking pavilions are in stone. The house has a concrete tiled roof, a band, two storeys, three bays, a central doorway with a semicircular head, and sash windows. The pavilions have a single storey and a single bay. The north pavilion has a flat roof and a central recess, and the south pavilion has a hipped roof, partly in slate and partly in corrugated iron, and a plank door.	II
Barn and byre range, Keld Farm; 54.52335°N 2.69168°W	—	Late 18th to early 19th century (probable)	The range of farm buildings is in stone, with quoins and a slate roof with a stone ridge. It has a single tall storey and five bays, and contains two plank doors, ventilation slits, and a cart entrance at the rear.	II
Cottage, barn, and cart shed, Keld Farm; 54.52329°N 2.69229°W	—	Late 18th to early 19th century (probable)	The cottage is stuccoed, and the barn and cart shed are in stone; all have slate roofs, the cottage and barn have two storeys, and the cart shed has one. The cottage has three bays, a central doorway, and one casement window, the other windows being sashes. The barn has two bays and a rear entrance, and the cart shed has three bays, and three segmental-headed cart openings.	II
Barn and byres, Plane Trees; 54.52571°N 2.67353°W	—	Late 18th to early 19th century (probable)	The farm building is in stone with quoins, and has two storeys and six bays. It contains five doors with hood moulds, and a first-floor cart entrance.	II
Milepost; 54.53990°N 2.68019°W		1825	The milepost was provided for the Heron Syke Turnpike Trust. It is in cast iron, about 3 feet (0.91 m) high, and has three concave sides and a domical ogee top. On the top is a foundry mark, and on the sides are the date and the distances in miles to Shap and to Penrith.	II
Milepost; 54.52587°N 2.67455°W		1825	The milepost was provided for the Heron Syke Turnpike Trust. It is in cast iron, about 3 feet (0.91 m) high, and has three concave sides and a domical ogee top. On the top is a foundry mark, and on the sides are the date and the distances in miles to Shap and to Penrith.	II
Milepost; 54.51227°N 2.66971°W		1825	The milepost was provided for the Heron Syke Turnpike Trust. It is in cast iron, about 3 feet (0.91 m) high, and has three concave sides and a domical ogee top. On the top is a foundry mark, and on the sides are the date and the distances in miles to Shap and to Penrith.	II
Milepost; 54.49775°N 2.67043°W		1825	The milepost was provided for the Heron Syke Turnpike Trust. It is in cast iron, about 3 feet (0.91 m) high, and has three concave sides and a domical ogee top. On the top is a foundry mark, and on the sides are the date and the distances in miles to Shap and to Penrith.	II
Barn/byre range, Keld Farm; 54.52343°N 2.69200°W	—	Early to mid 19th century	The range of farm buildings is in stone, and has a slate roof with a stone ridge. There are two storeys and five bays. It contains a segmental-headed doorway, a stable door, casement windows, ventilation slits, and a loft door. (Note: Street View in March 2009 shows that the barn has been converted for residential use.)	II
Lyndene; 54.52184°N 2.67120°W	—	Early to mid 19th century	A stone house with rusticated quoins, and a slate roof with a stone ridge. There are two storeys, a symmetrical front of three bays, and a rear outshut. In the centre is a doorway with pilasters, a keystone, and a pediment. The windows are sashes in stone surrounds.	II
Byre to north-east of Thornship farmhouse 54.52089°N 2.68695°W	—	Early to mid 19th century (probable)	The byre range is in rendered stone with quoins, and has a slate roof with a stone ridge. There are two storeys, and a symmetrical front of four bays. It contains doorways, a loft door with dove holes, and ventilation slits.	II
Farmhouse and hay-loft opposite Keld Farm; 54.52323°N 2.69181°W	—	1840	The house and hay loft are in stone with quoins, and have slate roofs with stone ridges. The house has two storeys and a symmetrical three-bay front. The central doorway has moulded jambs, and a porch with a pediment containing initials and the date. The windows are sashes. To the right the hay loft has a single bay and steps at the rear leading to an entrance.	II
Barn, The Rockery; 54.53366°N 2.67967°W	—	Mid 19th century	The barn is in stone with quoins and has a slate roof with a stone ridge. The openings include byre doors, a winnowing door, a wagon entrance, and an owl hole. (Note: Street View in April 2011 shows that the barn has been converted for residential use.)	II
North gates and piers, St Michael's churchyard 54.53179°N 2.67549°W	—	19th century (probable)	At the northern entrance to the churchyard of St Michael's Church are a pair of gate piers. They are square, in ashlar stone on moulded plinths, and each pier is about 9 feet (2.7 m) high, with a cornice and a domical ogee cap. Between the piers are wrought iron gates.	II
Wall, piers, railings and gate, New Ing Farmhouse; 54.53337°N 2.67826°W	—	Mid to late 19th century (probable)	The wall encloses the forecourt of the farmhouse, it is in rubble stone, about 2 feet (0.61 m) high, with segmental copings. The gate and end piers are in ashlar stone, they are about 5 feet (1.5 m) high, and have ogee-domed tops. The railings and gate are in wrought iron with cast iron posts.	II
War memorial 54.53169°N 2.67543°W		1920	The war memorial is in the churchyard of St Michael's Church. It is in Shap granite, and consists of a wheel-head cross with a tapering shaft on a tapering four-sided plinth and a single-stepped base. There is an IHS Christogram on the centre of the cross head, and on the plinth and face are inscriptions and the names of those lost in the two World Wars. The memorial is surrounded by a semicircular stone kerb.	II

== Notes and references ==
=== Sources ===
- Historic England, "Church of St Michael, Shap (1159061)", National Heritage List for England
- Historic England, "Keld Chapel, Shap (1067845)", National Heritage List for England
- Historic England, "Keld Chapel, Shap (1020669)", National Heritage List for England
- Historic England, "Greyhound Hotel with milestone and mounting block, Shap (1159149)", National Heritage List for England
- Historic England, "Market Hall, Shap (1145382)", National Heritage List for England
- Historic England, "The Hermitage, Shap (1326750)", National Heritage List for England
- Historic England, "Plane Trees and houses adjoining east end, Shap (1145380)", National Heritage List for England
- Historic England, "Green Farmhouse with adjoining cottage, barn/byre range, and area wall, Shap (1311133)", National Heritage List for England
- Historic England, "New Ing Farmhouse, Shap (1159105)", National Heritage List for England
- Historic England, "Barn to south of Thornship farmhouse, Shap (1145385)", National Heritage List for England
- Historic England, "Keld Farmhouse, Shap (1145378)", National Heritage List for England
- Historic England, "Coach house adjoining New Ing Farmhouse, Shap (1326749)", National Heritage List for England
- Historic England, "Thornship farmhouse and byre adjoining south end, Shap (1145384)", National Heritage List for England
- Historic England, "Nos. 1 and 2 The Rockery and converted outbuildings adjoining, Shap (1326752)", National Heritage List for England
- Historic England, "Croft House, Shap (1326751)", National Heritage List for England
- Historic England, "Cross Cottage and Cross Farmhouse with adjoining barn/byre range, Shap (1159161)", National Heritage List for England
- Historic England, "Green House with pavilions, Shap (1145383)", National Heritage List for England
- Historic England, "Barn/byre range adjoining farmhouse opposite Keld Farm, Shap (1145379)", National Heritage List for England
- Historic England, "Cottage, barn, and cart shed adjoining to left of Keld Farmhouse, Shap (1326748)", National Heritage List for England
- Historic England, "Barn/byres to north-east of Plane Trees, Shap (1159119)", National Heritage List for England
- Historic England, "Milepost 350 yards south of turn to Sleagill, Shap (1159044)", National Heritage List for England
- Historic England, "Milepost on roadside to east of Croft House, Shap (1159179)", National Heritage List for England
- Historic England, "Milepost (325 yards north of turn to Sleddale), Shap (1326747)", National Heritage List for England
- Historic England, "Milepost (opposite Shap Granite Works), Shap (1248964)", National Heritage List for England
- Historic England, "Barn/byre range adjoining to right of Keld Farmhouse, Shap (1311197)", National Heritage List for England
- Historic England, "Lyndene, Shap (1145381)", National Heritage List for England
- Historic England, "Byre to north-east of Thornship farmhouse, Shap (1159254)", National Heritage List for England
- Historic England, "Farmhouse opposite Keld Farm with attached hay-loft, Shap (1159092)", National Heritage List for England
- Historic England, "Barn adjoining north end of The Rockery, Shap (1159231)", National Heritage List for England
- Historic England, "North entrance gates and piers to St Michael's churchyard, Shap (1145377)", National Heritage List for England
- Historic England, "Forecourt wall, piers, railings and gate to New Ing Farmhouse, Shap (1159111)", National Heritage List for England
- Historic England, "Shap War Memorial, Shap (1457760)", National Heritage List for England
- Historic England, Listed Buildings
- Hyde, Matthew; Pevsner, Nikolaus (2010) [1967], Cumbria, The Buildings of England, New Haven and London: Yale University Press, ISBN 978-0-300-12663-1
