= Shap Rural =

Civil parish in Cumbria, England

Coordinates: 54.502°N 2.721°W

- Civil parish
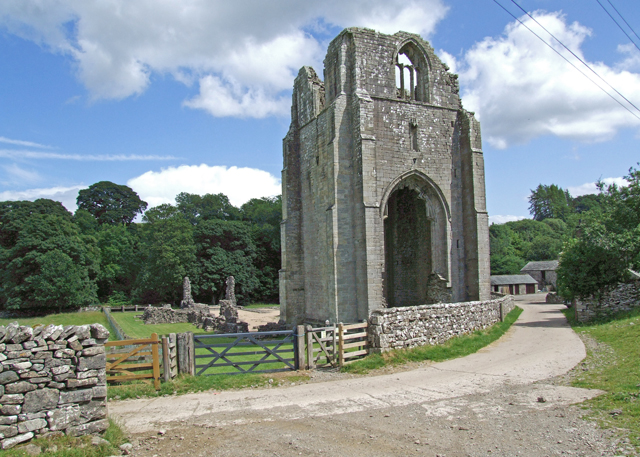
- Shap Abbey

- Location within Cumbria
- Population: 130 (2011)
- OS grid reference: NY5415
- Unitary authority: Westmorland and Furness
- Ceremonial county: Cumbria
- Region: North West
- Country: England
- Sovereign state: United Kingdom
- Post town: PENRITH
- Postcode district: CA10
- Dialling code: 01931
- Police: Cumbria
- Fire: Cumbria
- Ambulance: North West
- UK Parliament: Westmorland and Lonsdale

Shap Rural is a very large, but sparsely populated, civil parish in the Westmorland and Furness district of Cumbria in England, covering part of the Lake District National Park. It had a population of 119 in 2001, 130 at the 2011 Census, and 110 in 2021.

Within the parish are the hamlets and settlements of Wet Sleddale, Hardendale and Swindale, most of the Shap Fells range and the reservoirs of Haweswater (part) and Wet Sleddale. The village of Mardale Green, which disappeared when Haweswater was converted into a reservoir in the 1930s, was in the parish.

The parish was created in 1904 with the splitting of the former civil parish of Shap into urban and rural parts. Shap Urban, (since 1935 just Shap), was administered by an urban district council from 1905 to 1935. Shap and Shap Rural today have a joint parish council.

Major landowners in the parish are the Lowther Family Estates and United Utilities.

Junction 39 of the M6 motorway lies within the parish.

Shapbeck Limestone quarry owned by Heidelberg Materials UK is in the northern part of the parish though the Hardendale Corus limestone quarry and works and the famous Cemex (formerly RMC) Shap Granite quarries and works are within both Shap Rural and Shap parishes.

The cottage owned by Uncle Monty in the cult 1986 film Withnail & I is located by the reservoir at Wet Sleddale.

== Births in Shap Rural ==
- John Mill (theologian)

== See also ==
- Listed buildings in Shap Rural
