= Bampton, Cumbria =

Village and civil parish in Cumbria, England

Coordinates: 54.557°N 2.751°W

Bampton
- Village and parish
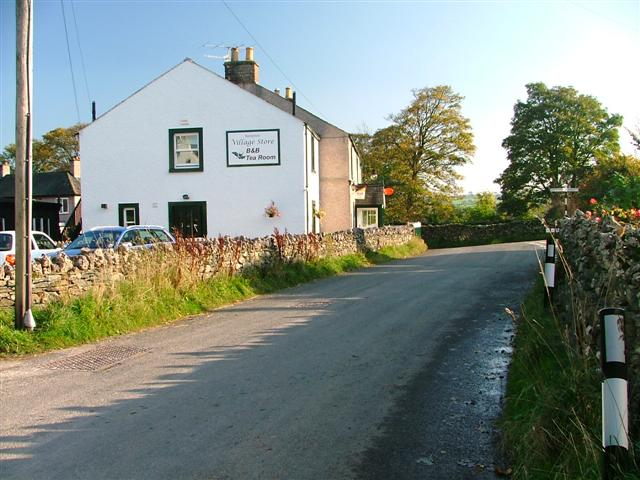
- Bampton Village Store and Post Office

- Location in the former Eden District Location within Cumbria
- Population: 373 (2011)
- OS grid reference: NY5118
- Civil parish: Bampton
- Unitary authority: Westmorland and Furness
- Ceremonial county: Cumbria
- Region: North West
- Country: England
- Sovereign state: United Kingdom
- Post town: PENRITH
- Postcode district: CA10
- Dialling code: 01931
- Police: Cumbria
- Fire: Cumbria
- Ambulance: North West
- UK Parliament: Westmorland and Lonsdale

Bampton is a village and civil parish in the Westmorland and Furness unitary authority area of Cumbria, England, on the edge of the Lake District National Park. It is in the historic county of Westmorland. The parish had a population of 283 according to the 2001 census. In the 2011 census Bampton was grouped with Martindale to give a total of 373. The parish includes the villages of Bampton, Bampton Grange, Butterwick and Bomby.

Bampton Grammar school was founded in 17th century when the industrial population was comparatively large. Depopulation reduced the necessity leading to the budgetary axe to fall on school provision. Until 2005 Bampton had a village school, which closed due to lack of children.

Haweswater Beck arises as a stream discharge from Haweswater Reservoir and flows eastward, just north of Firth Woods, and then turns north to join the River Lowther between Bampton and Bampton Grange.

The village of Bampton centres on The Mardale Inn, Bampton Valley Stores, Bampton Memorial Hall & playground, and Bridge End Garage & caravan site. The Mardale Inn was bought as a Community Pub in May 2022 by Bampton Valley Community Pub, a Community Benefit Society comprising over 500 Shareholder Members.

In Bampton Grange is St Patrick's Church, Bampton and the Crown and Mitre Inn (currently closed to non-residents).

Bampton produced England's first woman county councillor, Mary Noble, who represented Askham and Bampton on Westmorland County Council in 1907.

Also within the village of Bampton is the traditional red telephone box used in the 1987 cult classic movie Withnail & I.

There is a book called Ploughing in Latin that has been written about Bampton and one called Cast Iron Community about Burnbanks, the village built to house the Haweswater dam-builders.

== See also ==
- Listed buildings in Bampton, Cumbria
- List of English and Welsh endowed schools (19th century)
