= Hardendale =

Hamlet in Cumbria, England

Coordinates: 54.525°N 2.646°W

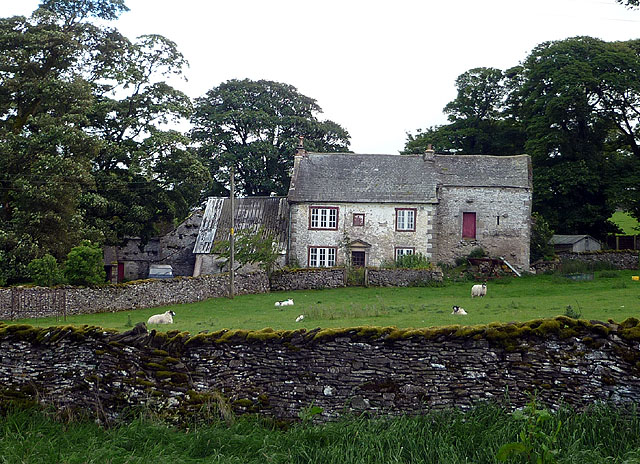
- Hardendale Hall

- Location in Eden, Cumbria Location within Cumbria
- OS grid reference: NY581146
- Civil parish: Shap Rural
- Unitary authority: Westmorland and Furness
- Ceremonial county: Cumbria
- Region: North West
- Country: England
- Sovereign state: United Kingdom
- Post town: PENRITH
- Postcode district: CA10
- Dialling code: 01931
- Police: Cumbria
- Fire: Cumbria
- Ambulance: North West
- UK Parliament: Westmorland and Lonsdale

Hardendale is a hamlet in the parish of Shap Rural in Westmorland and Furness, in the county of Cumbria, England, near Shap and junction 39 of the M6 motorway. It is also near the hamlet of Oddendale.

== Geography ==
A section of the M6 from Lancaster, at Over Kellet, to Penrith was published early April 1964, reaching 1,040 ft over Hardendale Fell, being 44 miles long; over 2.5 miles of the carriageways would be widely separated, up to 800ft.
