= Bomby =

Village in Cumbria, England

Coordinates: 54.54°N 02.74°W

- Location in Eden, Cumbria Location within Cumbria
- OS grid reference: NY5217
- Civil parish: Bampton
- Unitary authority: Westmorland and Furness
- Ceremonial county: Cumbria
- Region: North West
- Country: England
- Sovereign state: United Kingdom
- Post town: PENRITH
- Postcode district: CA10
- Dialling code: 01931
- Police: Cumbria
- Fire: Cumbria
- Ambulance: North West
- UK Parliament: Westmorland and Lonsdale

Bomby is a village in Cumbria, England. Bomby village consists only of one farm house. The farm is mostly known for its specific potatoes, the Kind Edward potato.
