= Askham Hall =

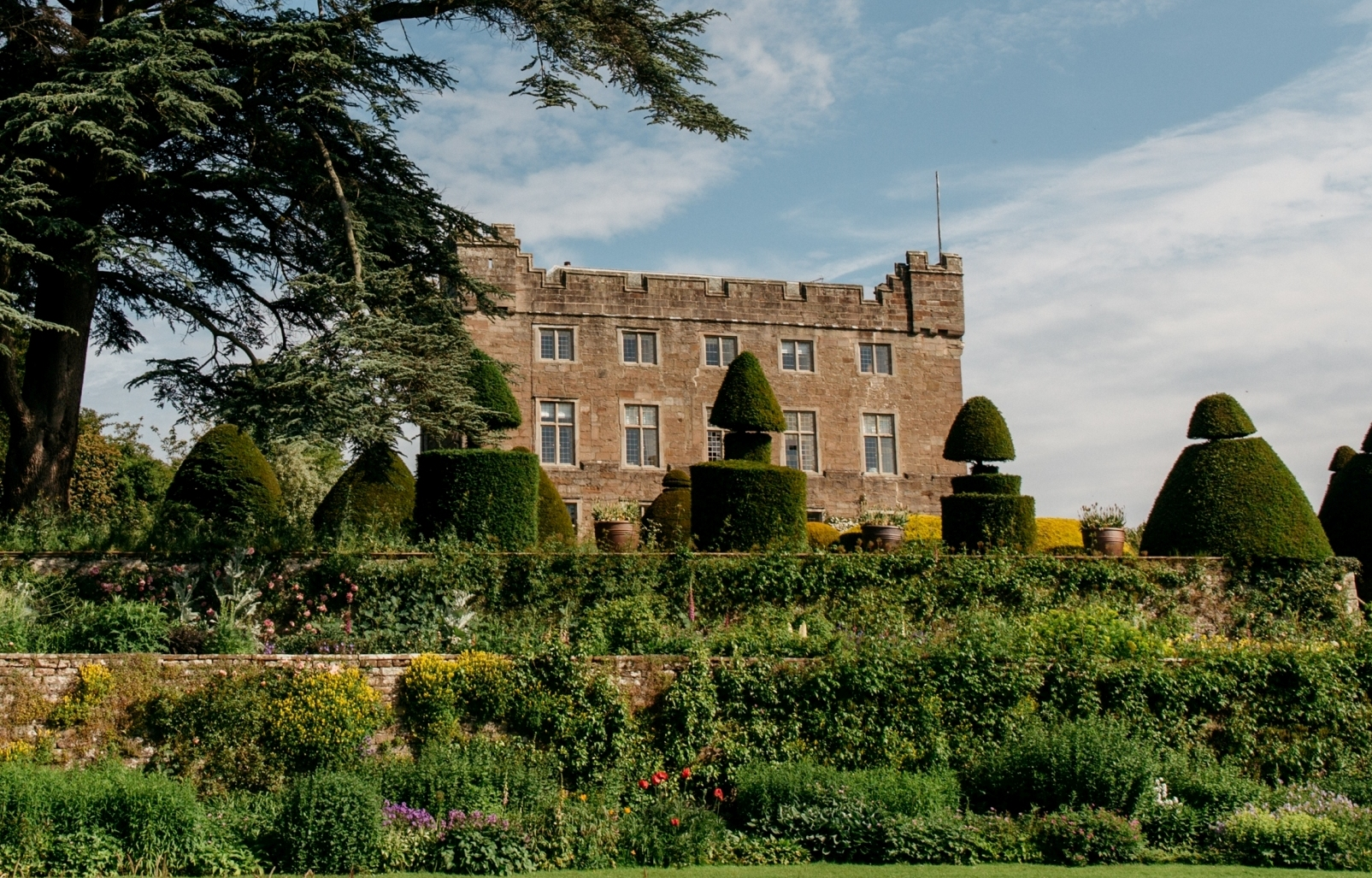
- Askham Hall and gardens

General information
- Type: Country house
- Town or city: Askham
- Country: England
- Coordinates: 54.6073°N 2.7507°W
- Year(s) built: 14th century (initial), 1575 (expanded)

Askham Hall is a country house near Askham in Cumbria. It is a Grade I listed building.

== History ==
A peel tower was built on the site during the 14th century. It passed into the hands of the Sandford family and in 1575 Thomas Sandford had it substantially enlarged. In 1730, with the death of William Sandford without male issue, it was inherited by his grandson, William Tatham. Tatham died childless in 1775, when the house was sold to Edward Bolton, a Preston lawyer. When he died childless in 1803, it was inherited by his great nephew, the infant Edward Bolton King, whose trustees sold it to William Lowther, 1st Earl of Lonsdale in 1815. It became a rectory in 1828 and then became a residence of the Lowther family in the 1830s. The 7th Earl of Lonsdale used it as his home after Lowther Castle was dismantled and closed in 1937. Askham Hall became a Grade I listed house in 1968.

Following the death of the 7th Earl in May 2006 the house has been owned by Caroline, Countess of Lonsdale. In 2012 the Countess of Lonsdale and her children, Charles Lowther and Marie-Louisa Raeburn, arranged the conversion of Askham Hall into a boutique hotel.

== See also ==
- Listed buildings in Askham, Cumbria
