= Shap Abbey =

Abbey in Cumbria, England

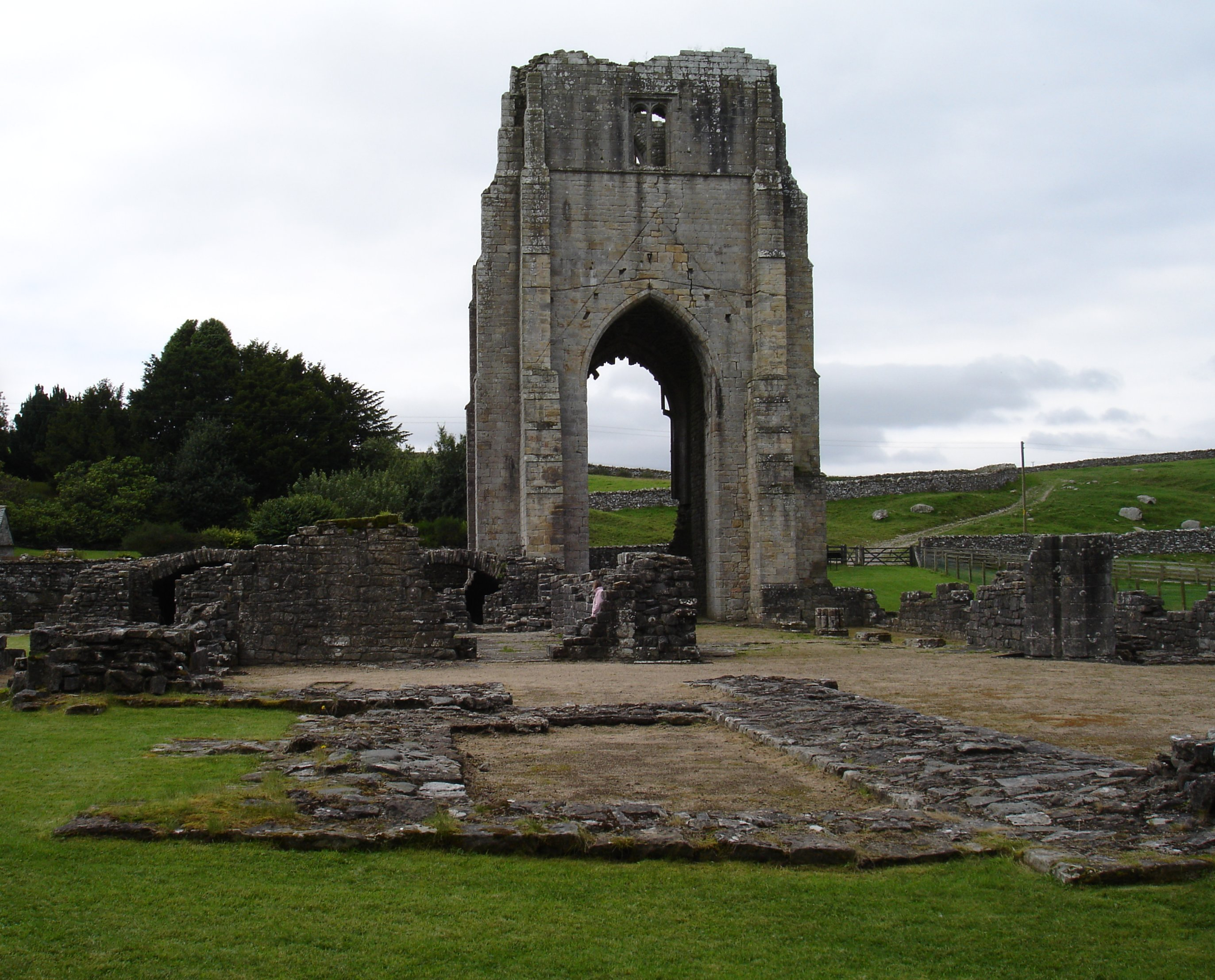
- Shap Abbey
- Interactive map of Shap Abbey

Monastery information
- Full name: Abbey church of St. Mary Magdalene
- Other name: Shap Abbey
- Order: Premonstratensian
- Established: 1190 near Kendal, 1199 on this site
- Disestablished: 1540
- Diocese: Carlisle

Site
- Location: Shap Rural, Cumbria, England
- Coordinates: 54°31′49″N 02°42′01″W
- Visible remains: large tower and outline of conventual buildings
- Public access: Yes, English Heritage

Shap Abbey was a religious house of the Premonstratensian order of Canons regular situated on the western bank of the River Lowther in the civil parish of Shap Rural, around 1.5 miles (2.4 km) from the village of Shap, in Westmorland and Furness, Cumbria, England. The site is in the care of English Heritage and managed on its behalf by the Lake District National Park.

== History ==
Although the present Shap Abbey was built in 1199, the monastic community was founded on another site 20 miles south near Kendal in 1190, but it moved to the present site, then called 'Hepp', in 1199. The old name meant 'a heap' but it gradually assumed the present-day name "Shap" over the next 100 years.

One of the abbots was the infamous Richard Redman (died 1505), later successively Bishop of St Asaph (c. 1471), Bishop of Exeter (1495), and Bishop of Ely (1501). He is remembered by a magnificent funeral monument in Ely Cathedral

Shap Abbey escaped the initial phase of the Dissolution of the Monasteries in 1536, but it was closed in 1540 and subsequently sold to the Governor of Carlisle. Most of the abbey buildings have been demolished, however the tower remains are still impressive, and the outline of the building plan is clearly visible.

Masonry was robbed away at the end of the 17th century to build Shap Market Hall, and much of the ornate carved stonework was also removed and used in the building of Lowther Castle. Many of the abbey buildings were incorporated into a farmhouse and used as barns, and little has happened to these over the last four centuries as they have formed part of a working farm.

== Burials ==
- Robert de Clifford, 1st Baron de Clifford
- Robert Clifford, 3rd Baron Clifford
- Roger Clifford, 5th Baron Clifford
- Henry Clifford, 10th Baron Clifford

== Access ==
The site is open to the public at all reasonable times and entry is free. Facilities are limited to a car park and a short path leading over the fields to the small 16th-century Keld Chapel, now in the care of the National Trust.

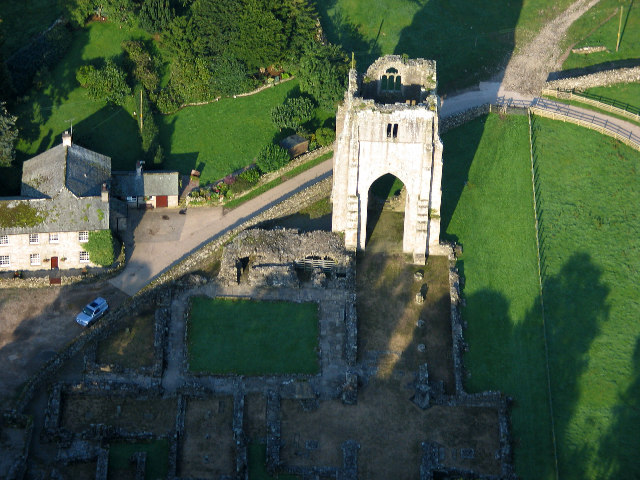
Shap Abbey August 2004, from the air.

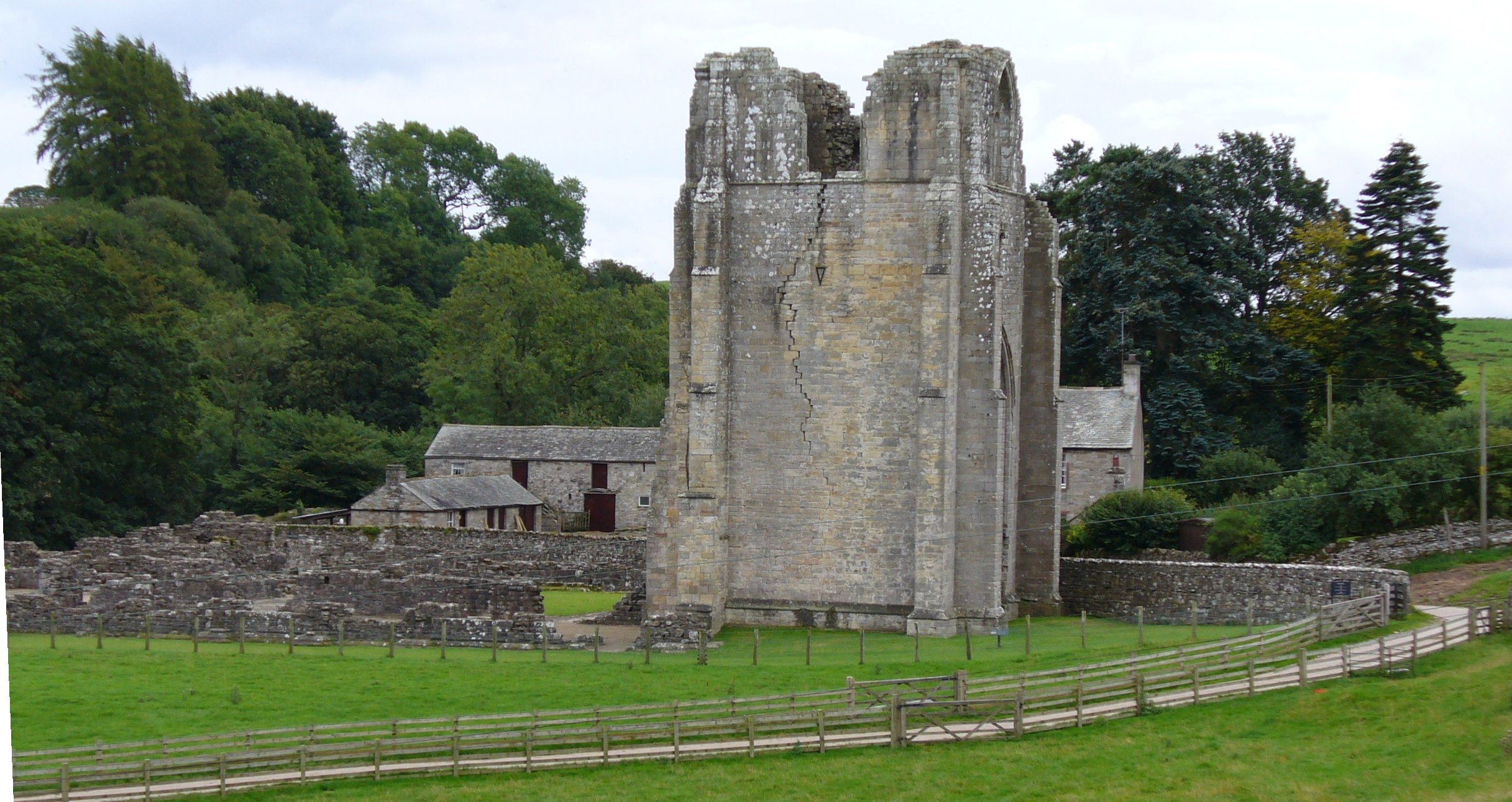
Remains of Shap Abbey tower
