= Haweswater Beck =

River in Cumbria, England

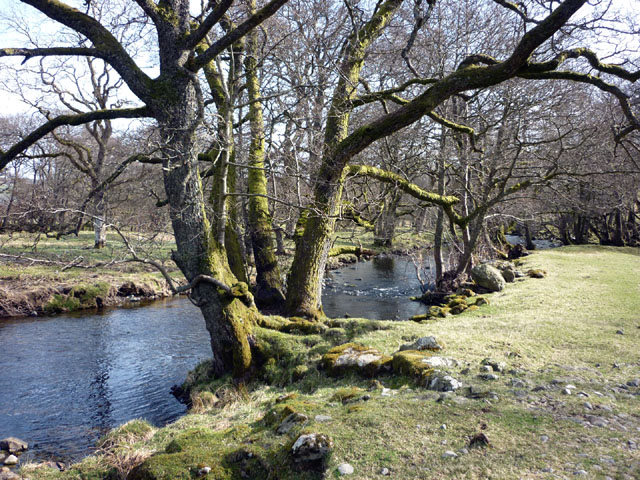
- Haweswater Beck, just north of Firth Woods, where it turns north towards Bampton Grange

- Location within Cumbria

Location
- Country: England
- County: Cumbria

Physical characteristics
- Source
  - location: near Haweswater Reservoir, Cumbria, Greater Manchester, England
  - coordinates: 54°32′5.47″N 2°46′5.28″W
- Mouth: Bampton
  - location: near Bampton Grange, Cumbria, England
  - coordinates: 54°33′23.24″N 2°44′44.69″W
  - elevation: 0 m (0 ft)
- Discharge
  - location: Bampton

Haweswater Beck flows through Cumbria in England. It arises as a stream discharge from Haweswater Reservoir, at Gill Dubs, just east of the dam, and flows eastward, just north of Firth Woods, and then turns north to join the River Lowther between Bampton and Bampton Grange.

Below Burnbanks near the Haweswater Dam it is crossed by Naddle Old Bridge (a disused Grade II listed 18th-century road bridge) and a little further downstream (at NY515161) by Park Bridge, a packhorse bridge. Between these bridges the stream is followed by the Coast to Coast Walk.

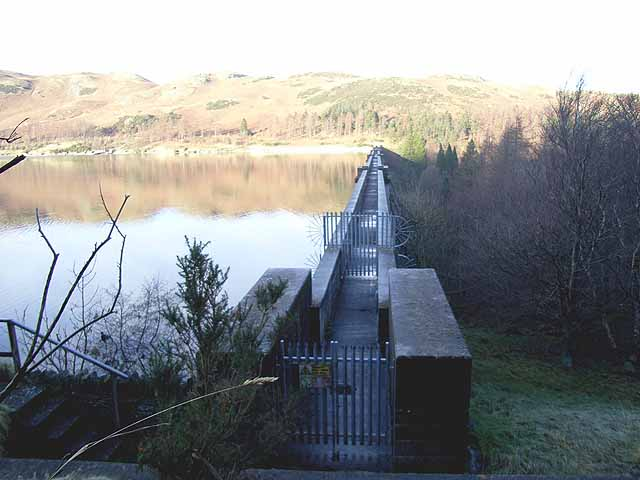
Top of Haweswater Dam, water supply of Greater Manchester, and the source of Haweswater Beck.
