= Askham, Cumbria =

Village and civil parish in Cumbria, England

Coordinates: 54.60°N 02.76°W

Askham
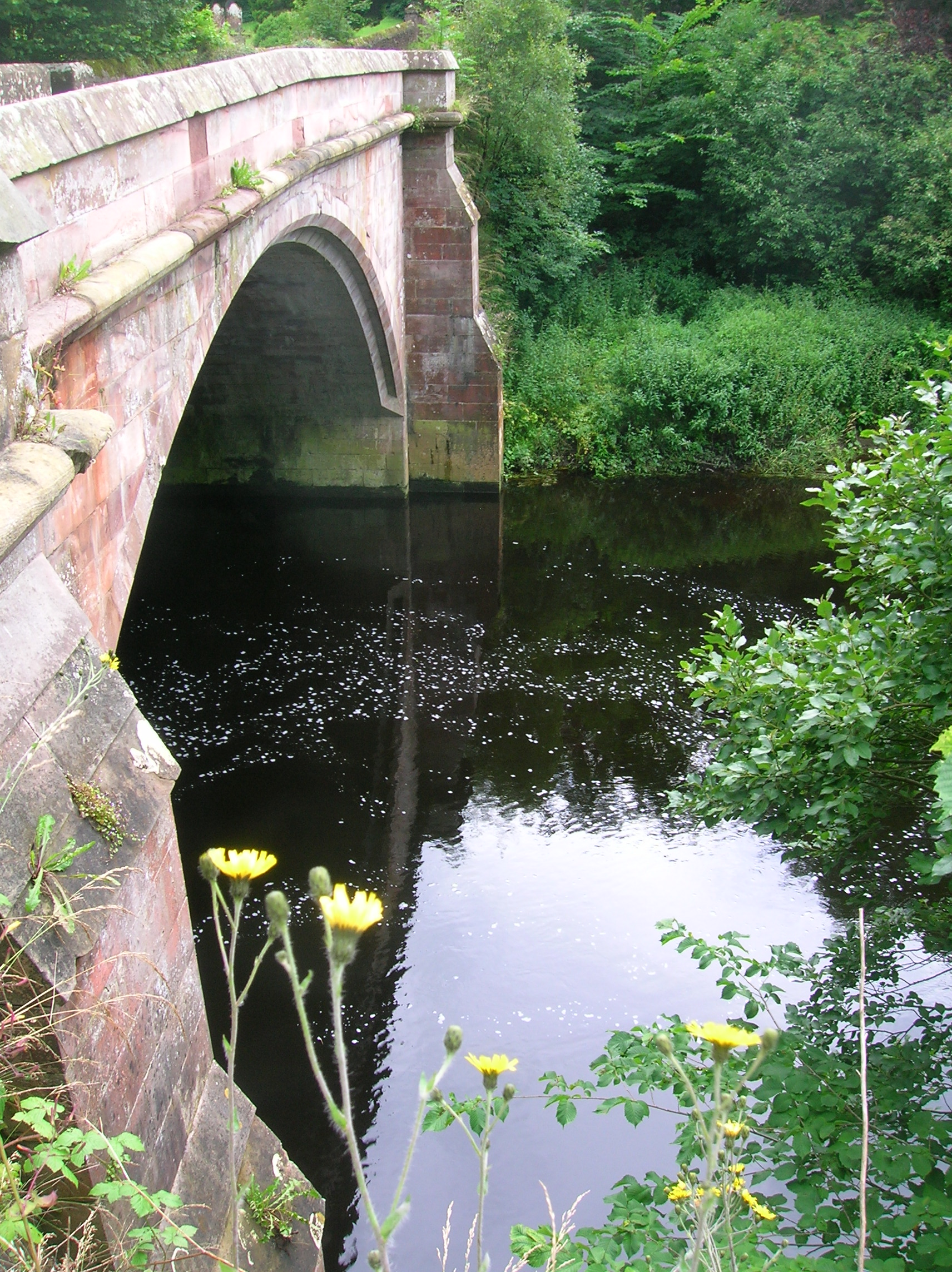
- The bridge over the River Lowther

- Location within Cumbria
- Population: 356 (2011)
- OS grid reference: NY6813
- Civil parish: Askham
- Unitary authority: Westmorland and Furness
- Ceremonial county: Cumbria
- Region: North West
- Country: England
- Sovereign state: United Kingdom
- Post town: PENRITH
- Postcode district: CA10
- Dialling code: 01931
- Police: Cumbria
- Fire: Cumbria
- Ambulance: North West
- UK Parliament: Westmorland and Lonsdale

Askham is a village and civil parish in Westmorland and Furness, Cumbria, England. It is in the historic county of Westmorland. According to the 2001 census the parish had a population of 360, decreasing slightly to 356 at the 2011 Census. It is on the eastern edge of the Lake District National Park, 4 miles (6.4 km) south of Penrith. Nearby are the remains of Lowther Castle, the site of the annual Lowther Show, a three-day event of country pursuits.

== History and culture ==
The primary landmark of Askham is Askham Hall. It evolved from a pele tower in the 14th century and was passed to the Sandford family after the Helbecks and Swinburns. In 1575, Thomas Sandford had it enlarged. In 1828 it served as a rectory before being passed to the Lowther family in the 1830s – the 7th Earl of Lonsdale used the hall as his residence following the abandonment of Lowther Castle in 1937. Askam Hall became a grade I listed building in 1968. After 2012, the Countess of Lonsdale converted it into a hotel.

The manor was 'anciently' referred to as Ascum.

Many public houses, such as the Punch Bowl, have old beams with splits in them where coins are forced for luck. This practice may be linked to examples called "wish trees", often hawthorns, which are traditionally linked with fertility, as in "May blossom". The trunk and branches in these cases are covered with hundreds of coins that have been driven through the bark and into the wood. The local traditions are that a wish will be granted for each of the coins so treated.

Another local custom is the throwing of coins from the bridge onto a boulder that lies below the water level. Getting the coin to stay on the rock gives the thrower good luck. These are examples of "touch pieces". Obvious connections exist with water generally and the practice of throwing in coins to seek favours of the water spirits.

== Governance ==
An electoral ward in the same name exists. This ward stretches south to Bampton with a total population of 1,432.

== See also ==
- Listed buildings in Askham, Cumbria
