= River Lowther =

River in Cumbria, England

Coordinates: 54°38′N 2°44′W

Lowther
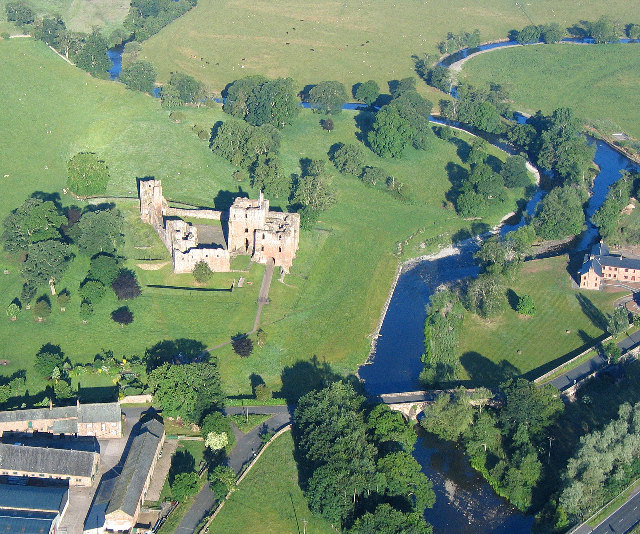
- The River Lowther where it joins the River Eamont close to Brougham Castle

Location
- Country: United Kingdom

Physical characteristics
- Source
  - location: the confluence of the Keld Gill and the Keld Dub near the village of Keld
- Mouth
  - location: confluence with River Eamont

The River Lowther is a small river which flows through limestone rock in Cumbria, England. It is a tributary of the River Eamont which in turn is a tributary of the River Eden which flows into the Solway Firth near Carlisle. The Lowther begins with the confluence of the Keld Gill and the Keld Dub near the village of Keld. It flows north-west until it passes between Bampton and Bampton Grange, before turning north until it flows into the River Eamont close to Penrith.

It is the main spawning area for Eden spring salmon, but is primarily a trout fishery. The river is held back by the Wet Sleddale dam, and so flows at a fairly consistent level (between 0.33 m and 1.8 m for 90% of monitoring time), with the highest level ever recorded at the River Lowther (2.93 m) occurring at Eamont Bridge, Beehive, on Sunday 6 December 2015.

Its name is recorded about 1175 as Lauder. It may come from Brittonic lǭwadr, "a washing or bathing place", which would give it the same etymology as Lauder, Scotland. Alternatively, it may come from Old Norse lauðr + á, meaning "foamy river".

== Settlements ==
- Keld
- Rosgill
- Bampton Grange
- Bampton
- Askham
- Lowther
- Eamont Bridge
- Brougham

== Sights and attractions ==
- Keld Chapel (National Trust), Keld
- Shap Abbey, (English Heritage), near Shap
- Askham Hall, Askham
- Lowther Castle
- Castlesteads Ruins, Yarnwath Woods
- King Arthur's Round Table Henge, Eamont Bridge
- Mayburgh Henge, Eamont Bridge
- Brougham Hall
- Brocavum Roman Camp
- Brougham Castle (English Heritage)

== Tributaries ==
- Swindale Beck
- Haweswater Beck
- Gill Beck
- Heltondale Beck

== Gallery ==
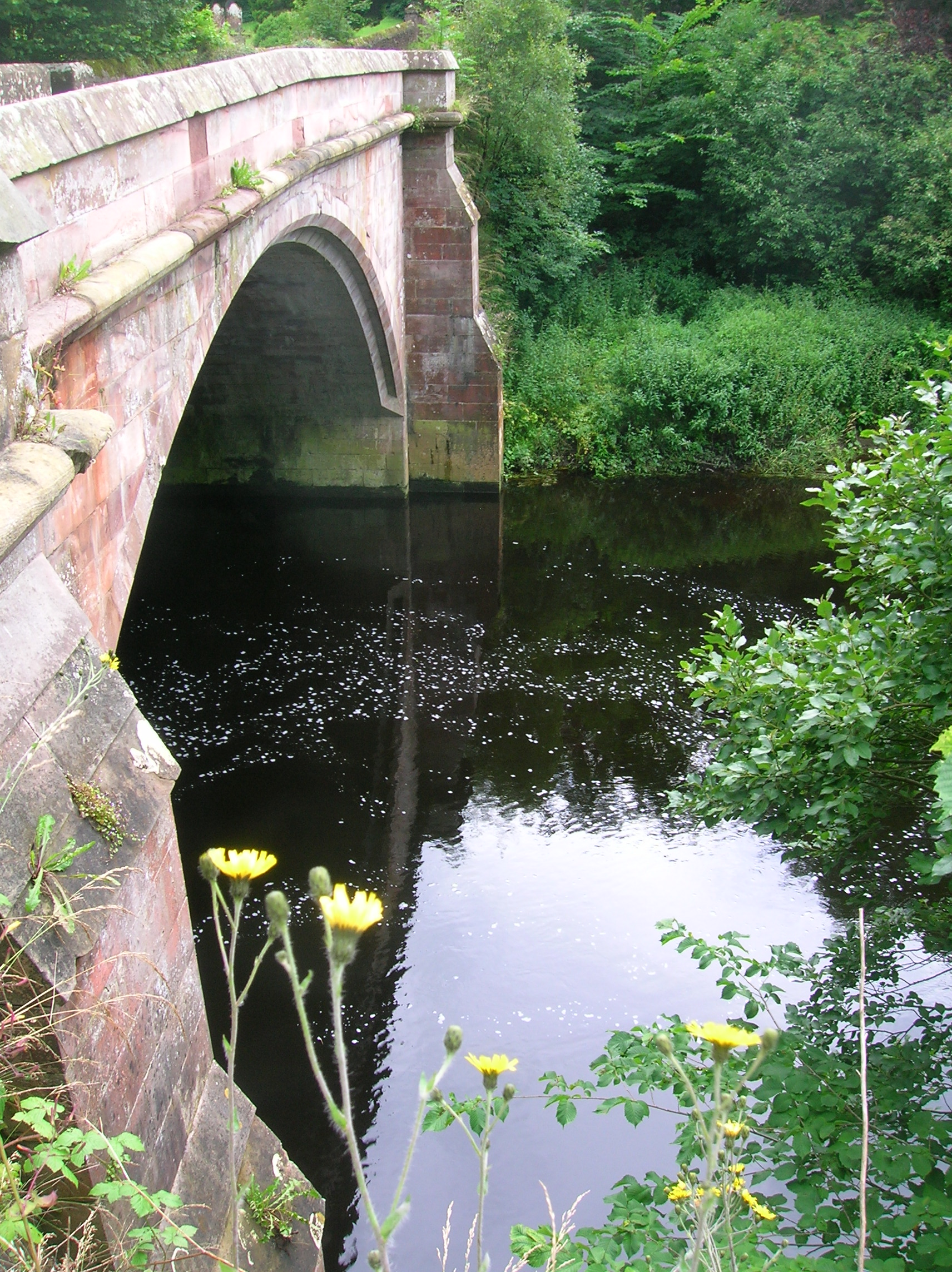
The bridge over the Lowther at Askham
