= High Seat (Lake District) =

Mountain in the English Lake District, Cumbria, England

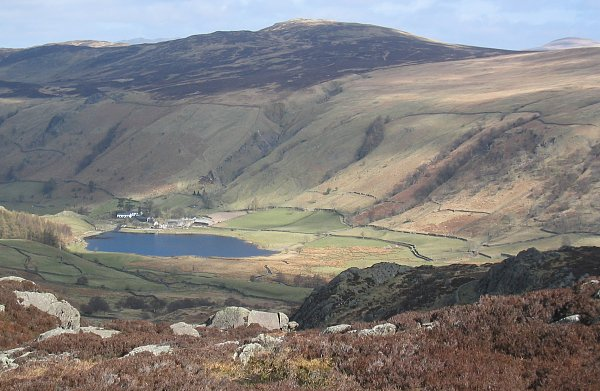
- High Seat above the village of Watendlath. By Ann Bowker.

Highest point
- Elevation: 608 m (1,995 ft)
- Prominence: 124 m (407 ft)
- Parent peak: High Raise
- Listing: Wainwright
- Coordinates: 54°33′07″N 3°06′14″W

Geography
- Location within the Lake District
- Location: Cumbria, England
- Parent range: Lake District, Central Fells
- OS grid: NY287180
- Topo map: OS Explorer OL4

High Seat is a fell in the centre of the English Lake District. Despite being below 2,000 feet (610 metres) in elevation, it is the highest point for about three miles (five kilometres) in any direction; a consequence of the curious fact that the centre of the district is lower than the surrounding parts.

== Topography ==
The main watershed of the Central Fells runs north-south, with Bleaberry Fell forming the northern end of the ridge. High Seat is the next fell to the south, before the land falls to High Tove.

High Seat sends out the spur of Dodd to the north west, separated from the body of the fell by Ashness Gill — a feeder of Watendlath Beck. Oddly, by the time the Gill reaches the famed viewpoint of Ashness Bridge, it has actually become Barrow Beck. The western flank here is clad in broadleaved woodland, but further south along Watendlath Beck this gives way to rock. Reecastle Crag being the principal face.

The southern boundary of the fell is formed by Raise Gill on the western side of the ridge and Shoulthwaite Gill in the east. To say that they drain The Peewits — the hideous bog on the ridge to High Tove — would be untrue, but they are fed by it. Shoulthwaite Gill does not head due east for Thirlmere as might be expected, but turns due north to form the eastern boundary. It is cut off from the reservoir by the lower parallel ridge of Raven Crag and High Rigg and instead makes a beeline for the River Greta. Mere Gill, one of its many tributaries forms the north eastern edge of High Seat. This flows from a point on the ridge to Bleaberry Fell which bears the name of Threefooted Brandreth: (a brandreth being the word for a three-legged stand in an oven on which a griddle was placed when cakes etc. were baked.)

== Litt's Memorial ==
Below Threefooted Brandreth on the eastern slope, sitting on a shallow saddle above Mere Ghyll is the Litt's Memorial. On 9 March 1880 John Litt was following the Blencathra Foxhounds when he inexplicably fell behind and failed to return. A search party found his body at that place the following day. As recorded in the "English Lakes Visitor and Keswick Guardian" for March 1880:

Man found dead on the mountains – Early on Wednesday morning it was reported that two men, named John Litt and John Vickers, who had been following the Blencathra hounds the previous day had not returned. Litt had been last seen on the bog about 200 yards west of Raven Crag where he had been, with other, resting and watching the hounds in the valley below. … Although he seemed somewhat fatigued he did not complain, and the hunters, absorbed in the chase did not look behind. When his absence from home was known a number of willing volunteers went to search for him. … Mr David Powley at once proceeded to Mr Oliver, the shepherd on Castlerigg Fell, who probably was the last person in Litt’s company, and the two immediately struck for the point where Mr Oliver parted from the deceased. They took a dog with them and it found the body not fifteen yards from the place they were making to. The searchers were: Messrs C. C. Thompson, Thos. Hodgson (Station Road), J. W. Grisdale, Thos. Harrison, David Powley, Joseph Bouch, Geo. Atkinson, Isaac Wren, Joseph Bristo, Benjamin Hodgson, A. G. Pettit, and Wm. Wood.

The memorial consists of two upright stones, one bearing a round plate inscribed 'In memory of J Litt who died March 9, 1880'. The second stone bears a faint inscription.

== Geology ==
The summit is covered by peat, overlying the plagioclase-phyric andesite lavas of the Birker Fell Formation. There is a small bed of volcaniclastic sandstone to the south while the northern slopes are predominantly garnet-bearing porphyritic andesite.

== Summit ==
The upper part of the fell, in excess of one square mile (2.5 square kilometres) in area, is soft, peaty and drab. The exception is the ridge itself, which is considerably wetter. A fence runs along the ridge, a useful guide in mist and occasionally necessary for bog bouncing. The summit is set on a small rock platform with an Ordnance Survey column. A rocky knoll (called Man) stands on the other side of the fence. The views are extensive due to the central location and a lack of higher neighbours. The Helvellyn range is seen end to end, together with a panorama of high fells on the other side of the ridge from Crinkle Crags in the south to Blencathra in the north.

== Ascents ==
By parking near Ashness Bridge on the road to Watendlath, access to the western side of the ridge can be gained at high level. Ashness Gill can be followed upwards through increasingly wet country until a final bee-line is made for the summit. From further up the road at the base of Reecastle Crag a more direct line is possible, or the climb can be made from Watendlath itself, first ascending High Tove via the zig-zags. The direct ascent noted by Wainwright from the hamlet appears to have access problems.

Eastern approaches begin on the A591 at Rough How Bridge, making a start along the secluded valley of Shoulthwaite before heading up the fellside in the vicinity of Mere Gill.

== Panorama ==
The following Wainwrights are visible on a clear day:

No	Fell	Heading (°)	Distance (miles)
1	Great Calva	0.4	8.1
2	Knott	2.3	9.3
3	High Pike (Caldbeck)	9.4	10.7
4	Blencathra	19.4	6.4
5	High Rigg	27.0	2.7
6	Souther Fell	30.3	8.0
7	Clough Head	45.1	4.0
8	Great Dodd	64.7	3.7
9	Raven Crag	65.6	1.0
10	Watson's Dodd	72.1	3.1
11	Stybarrow Dodd	80.4	3.5
12	Raise	96.4	3.5
13	White Side	105.2	3.2
14	Catstycam	110.0	4.0
15	Helvellyn	117.8	3.8
16	Nethermost Pike	123.9	4.2
17	Dollywaggon Pike	130.0	4.8
18	Great Rigg	137.6	6.4
19	Seat Sandal	138.8	5.4
20	Heron Pike	144.3	7.4
21	Stone Arthur	145.2	6.6
22	Nab Scar	147.3	7.9
23	Steel Fell	154.7	4.7
24	Armboth Fell	156.5	1.4
25	High Tove	174.7	1.0
26	Ullscarf	175.7	3.7
27	High Raise (Langdale)	183.8	5.3
28	Pike of Stickle	186.5	6.7
29	Grey Friar	188.0	11.2
30	Cold Pike	188.9	9.2
31	Sergeant's Crag	190.9	4.3
32	Eagle Crag	191.0	3.8
33	Crinkle Crags	195.6	8.6
34	Rossett Pike	199.4	7.0
35	Bowfell	199.5	7.7
36	Esk Pike	205.0	7.3
37	Great Crag	206.9	2.4
38	Rosthwaite Fell	206.9	3.9
39	Glaramara	207.8	5.4
40	Great End	211.5	7.1
41	Scafell Pike	212.8	8.1
42	Scafell	214.0	8.8
43	Seathwaite Fell	214.9	6.4
44	Lingmell	217.5	7.9
45	Base Brown	222.5	5.7
46	Green Gable	223.8	6.5
47	Great Gable	223.8	6.8
48	Brandreth	229.1	6.0
49	Kirk Fell	229.8	7.5
50	Grey Knotts	231.0	5.6
51	Grange Fell	231.1	1.8
52	Red Pike (Wasdale)	237.7	8.9
53	Castle Crag	239.8	2.8
54	Pillar	242.0	8.1
55	Dale Head	246.0	4.4
56	High Spy	249.7	3.5
57	High Stile	253.8	7.8
58	Hindscarth	256.7	4.6
59	Robinson	261.0	5.4
60	Maiden Moor	270.1	3.2
61	Gavel Fell	270.4	10.7
62	Mellbreak	271.2	8.7
63	Whiteless Pike	273.8	6.7
64	Knott Rigg	274.1	5.6
65	Wandope	278.5	6.3
66	Grasmoor	280.6	7.1
67	Ard Crags	280.8	5.1
68	Crag Hill	282.4	6.1
69	Sail	282.8	5.7
70	Scar Crags	287.0	5.2
71	Whiteside	288.7	7.4
72	Hopegill Head	290.8	6.8
73	Causey Pike	290.9	4.6
74	Catbells	291.0	2.9
75	Outerside	292.7	5.2
76	Grisedale Pike	295.5	6.2
77	Barrow	300.4	4.4
78	Whinlatter	305.7	7.1
79	Broom Fell	313.2	8.0
80	Lord's Seat	314.4	7.4
81	Barf	318.8	7.0
82	Sale Fell	320.1	9.2
83	Dodd	333.9	6.4
84	Ullock Pike	336.9	7.2
85	Long Side	338.3	6.9
86	Carl Side	340.8	6.5
87	Skiddaw	345.0	7.0
88	Skiddaw Little Man	346.8	6.2
89	Bleaberry Fell	350.4	0.9
90	Lonscale Fell	357.5	5.6
