= High Tove =

Fell in the Lake District, England

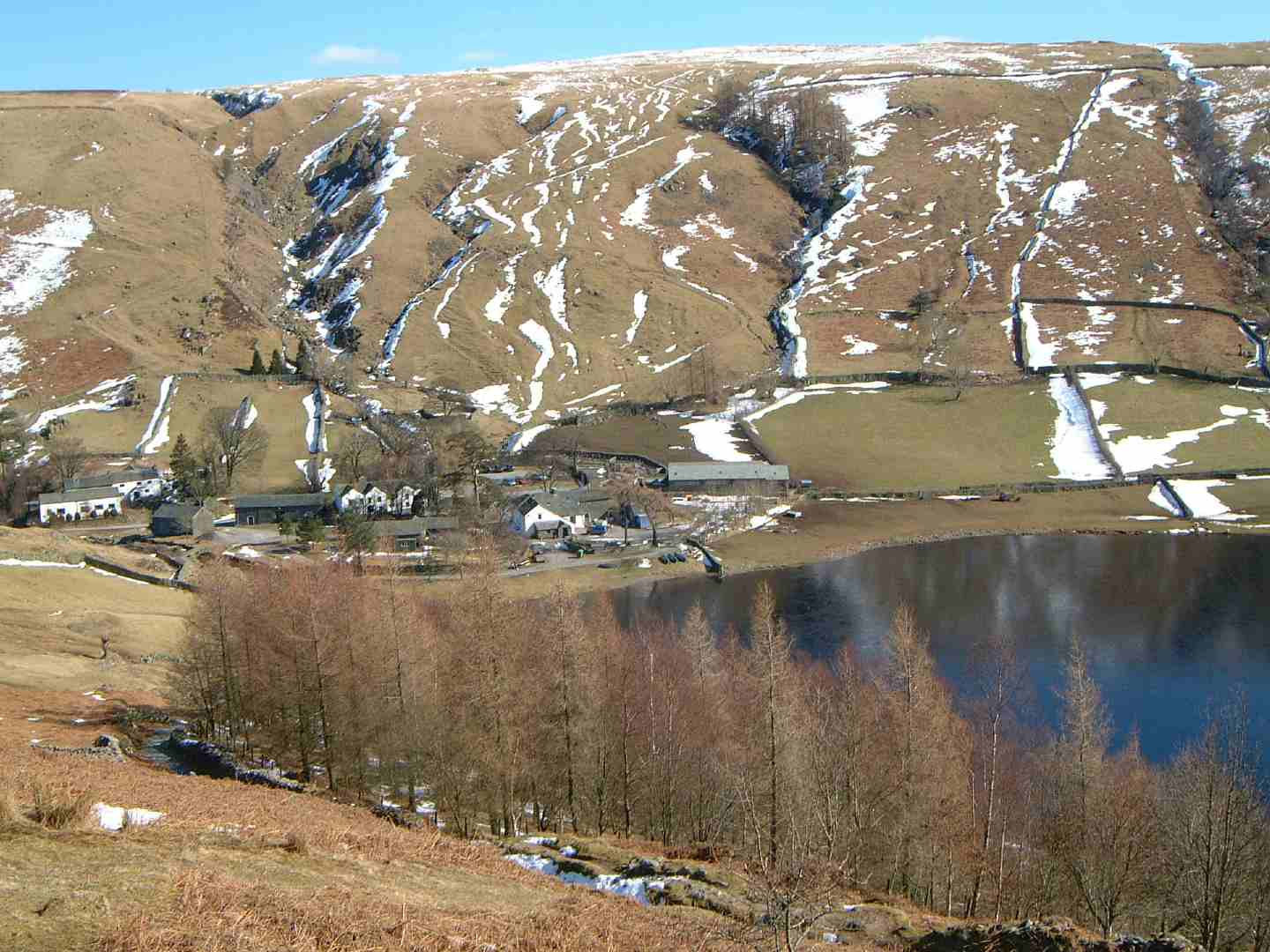
- The slope of High Tove rising behind Watendlath and its tarn

Highest point
- Elevation: 515 m (1,690 ft)
- Prominence: c. 16 m
- Parent peak: High Seat
- Listing: Wainwright
- Coordinates: 54°32′23″N 3°06′07″W

Geography
- Location within the Lake District
- Location: Cumbria, England
- Parent range: Lake District, Central Fells
- OS grid: NY288166
- Topo map: OS Explorer OL4

High Tove is a fell in the English Lake District, close to the geographical centre of the Cumbrian hills. It forms part of the watershed between the Derwentwater and Thirlmere catchments, a ridge running broadly north-south.

== Topography ==
Sitting astride the spine of the Central Fells, High Tove is an outlier of High Seat. It is separated from its taller northern neighbour by the Pewits, an extremely boggy depression. The ridge moves on south across further upland marsh towards Ullscarf, passing over the three rocky (and dry) outcrops of Middle Crag, Shivery Knott and Watendlath Fell (summit unnamed on Ordnance Survey maps). Armboth Fell lies to the south east of High Tove, connected to the ridge by a broad heathery saddle.

High Tove covers around one and a half miles of the north-south ridge, which is approximately a mile in width. It is bounded on the west by Watendlath Gill and its main feeder, Blea Tarn Gill. These flow to Watendlath Tarn, a popular beauty spot. The tarn is available for private fishing, being well stocked with trout. It holds a wide selection of flora, including water lilies and is at least 50 ft deep. Fisher and Launchy Gills provide the eastern boundaries of High Tove, flowing north and south around Armboth Fell respectively. Both are feeders of Thirlmere.

== Geology ==
The summit is an island outcrop of the Thirlmere Member in a sea of drift deposits. The Thirlmere Member comprises welded rhyodacitic tuff with breccia.

== Ascents ==
A bridleway provides the pass from Watendlath to Armboth crossing the ridge. Unusually it keeps to the summit rather than a depression, in an attempt to avoid wet ground. A further path runs along the watershed, accompanied by a wire fence. This can prove useful for crossing the worst of the bogs.

== Summit ==
The top has a large cairn, which in Wainwright's words offers a seat to travellers who wish to pour the water out of their boots.

The views are good to the either side, the Helvellyn range nearby to the east and a wide selection of major fells visible on the opposite flank of the ridge. Higher neighbours obstruct the view to north and south.

The following Wainwrights are visible on a clear day:

No	Fell	Heading (°)	Distance (miles)
1	Blencathra	16.1	7.3
2	Souther Fell	26.5	8.9
3	Clough Head	35.7	4.7
4	Great Dodd	51.6	4.1
5	Watson's Dodd	55.8	3.5
6	Stybarrow Dodd	64.8	3.7
7	Raise	79.8	3.4
8	White Side	87.4	3.0
9	Helvellyn	103.4	3.4
10	Nethermost Pike	111.9	3.7
11	Dollywaggon Pike	120.3	4.1
12	Fairfield	123.5	5.2
13	Armboth Fell	124.2	0.6
14	Seat Sandal	131.5	4.6
15	Heron Pike	139.9	6.6
16	Stone Arthur	140.3	5.8
17	Steel Fell	149.6	3.8
18	Ullscarf	176.0	2.7
19	High Raise (Langdale)	185.9	4.4
20	Sergeant's Crag	195.6	3.3
21	Eagle Crag	196.5	2.9
22	Crinkle Crags	198.2	7.7
23	Bowfell	203.0	6.8
24	Rossett Pike	203.3	6.1
25	Esk Pike	209.4	6.5
26	Glaramara	214.6	4.6
27	Rosthwaite Fell	216.6	3.2
28	Great End	216.8	6.4
29	Scafell Pike	217.5	7.4
30	Seathwaite Fell	221.4	5.7
31	Lingmell	222.9	7.2
32	Great Crag	225.7	1.6
33	Great Gable	230.8	6.2
34	Base Brown	230.9	5.1
35	Green Gable	231.2	5.9
36	Kirk Fell	236.5	7.0
37	Brandreth	237.6	5.4
38	Grey Knotts	240.4	5.1
39	Red Pike (Wasdale)	243.6	8.5
40	Pillar	248.8	7.8
41	Dale Head	259.0	4.2
42	Grange Fell	263.7	1.5
43	High Spy	266.0	3.4
44	Hindscarth	269.2	4.6
45	Robinson	271.5	5.4
46	Whiteless Pike	281.9	6.9
47	Maiden Moor	286.9	3.4
48	Wandope	286.9	6.6
49	Grasmoor	288.0	7.4
50	Ard Crags	290.8	5.5
51	Crag Hill	290.8	6.5
52	Sail	291.7	6.1
53	Scar Crags	296.4	5.6
54	Hopegill Head	297.8	7.3
55	Causey Pike	300.9	5.1
56	Grisedale Pike	302.7	6.8
57	Catbells	305.7	3.5
58	Barrow	309.6	5.1
59	Whinlatter	311.3	7.8
60	Broom Fell	317.5	8.8
61	Lord's Seat	318.9	8.2
62	Barf	323.1	7.9
63	High Seat	354.7	1.0
