= Armboth Fell =

Mountain in Cumbria, England

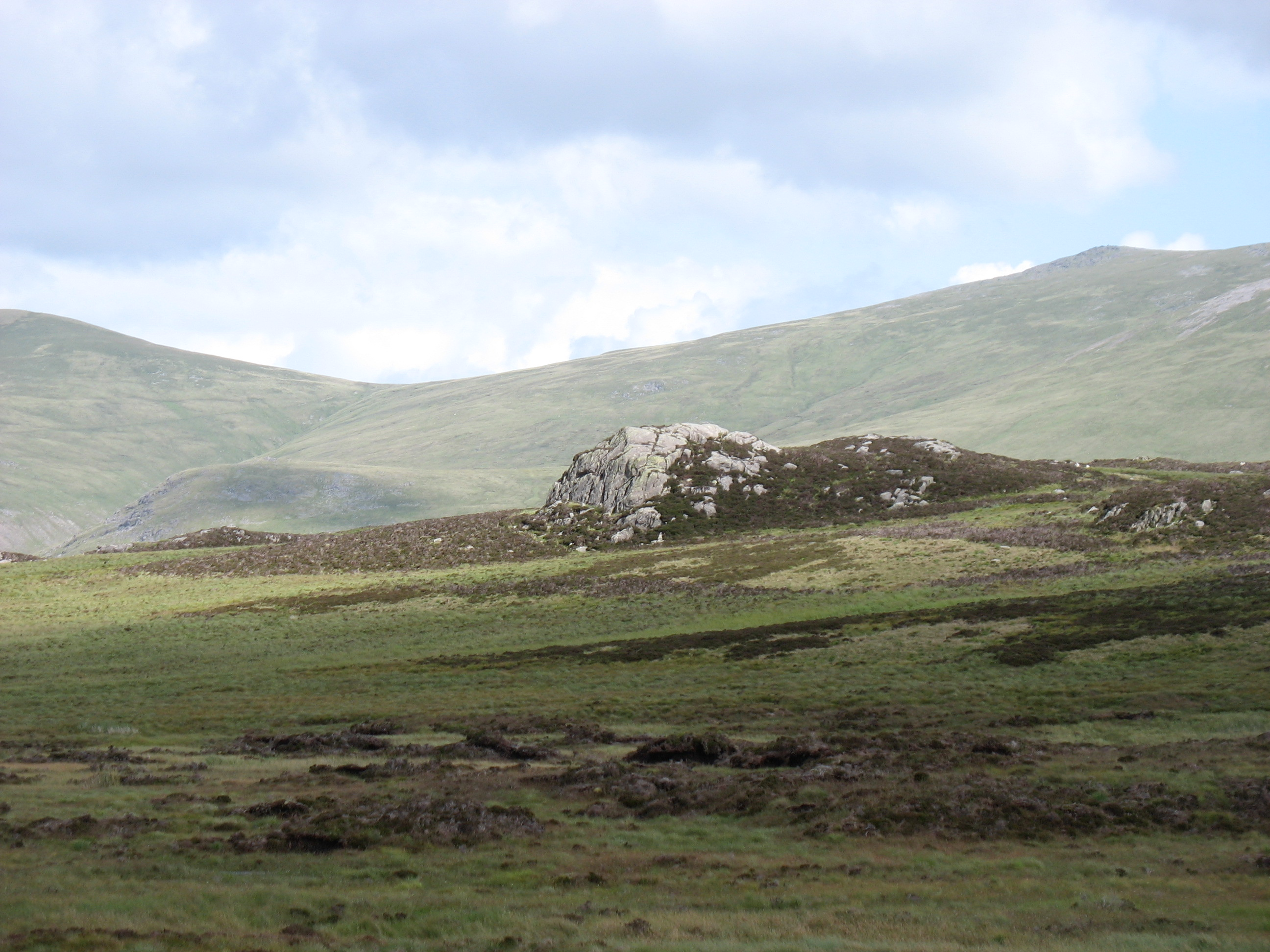

Highest point
- Elevation: 479 m (1,572 ft)
- Prominence: c. 25 metres (82 ft)
- Parent peak: High Seat
- Listing: Wainwright
- Coordinates: 54°32′00″N 3°05′16″W

Geography
- Location within the Lake District
- Location: Cumbria, England
- Parent range: Lake District, Central Fells
- OS grid: NY297159
- Topo map: OS Explorer OL4

Armboth Fell is a fell in the English Lake District, regarded by Alfred Wainwright as the centre of Lakeland. It is named for the former settlement of Armboth. The fell is a domed plateau, three-quarters of a mile across, jutting out to the east of the Derwentwater-Thirlmere watershed, in the Cumberland district. The fell is wet underfoot, with large areas clad in heather. The eastern slopes above Thirlmere have been planted with conifers.

== Topography ==
Armboth Fell joins the main ridge via a shallow depression, a little to the south of High Tove, and due east of Middle Crag. This boggy low point is the source of both Fisher Gill and Launchy Gill, which form the fell's northern and southern boundaries respectively. Fisher Gill takes the shorter course, flowing straight for the shore of the reservoir through a break in the conifers below Cockrigg Crag. It enters the lake near the Armboth public car park. Launchy Gill flows across the plateau via Launchy Tarn. This is prominent on OS maps, but on the ground is a pool 20 ft (6.1 m) wide. Very shallow, it lies on a gently sloping band of rock. Launchy Gill then drops through the forest over a series of waterfalls. A marked nature tail, popular with children, follows the lower part of the gill through the trees.

Prominent on the eastern flank of the fell is Fisher Crag (1,386 feet, 422 m), a striking rock face set all about by trees and midway between the two gills. Reminiscent of Raven Crag to the north, this is a fine viewpoint for Thirlmere and the Eastern Fells, although public right of way is uncertain.

== Armboth ==
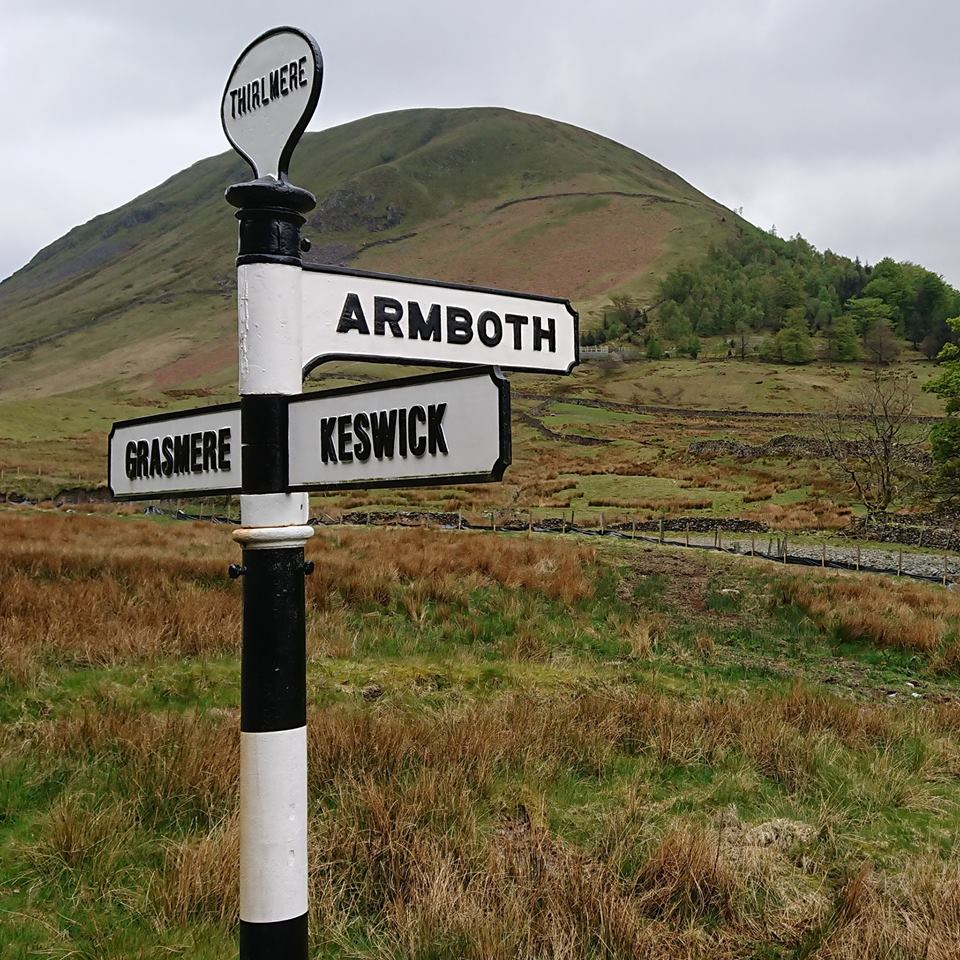
Signpost on the A591 road to the former settlement at Armboth

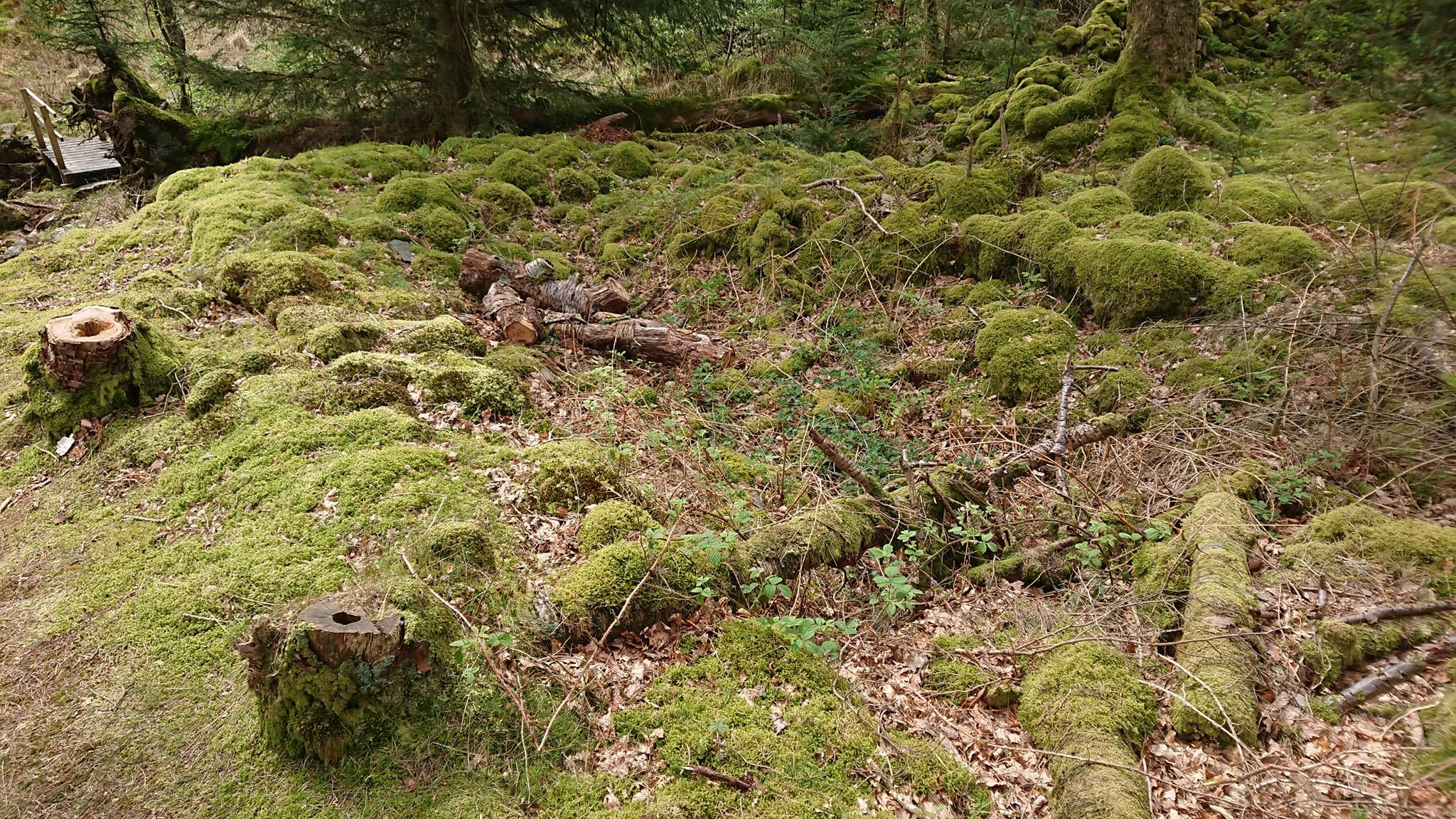
Outline of former building or enclosure at Armboth

The fell is named for the settlement of Armboth which stood on the shore of Thirlmere near the mouth of Fisher Gill. When the level of the lake was raised to create the reservoir in the 1880s, the village was abandoned and submerged. The only remaining structure is the summerhouse of Armboth Hall which lies amid the trees, although a number of ruins, enclosures and tracks can still be found within the forest. There is now no habitation on the western shore of the lake, although 'Armboth' still appears on some signposts.

== Geology ==
The Birker Fell Formation (plagioclase-phyric andesite lavas) predominates, overlain by till. To the east of the summit are outcrops of garnet bearing porphyritic andesite.

== Summit ==
A small rock outcrop forms the summit, complete with a cairn. A further knoll to the northeast is of similar altitude. Much of the fell, particularly towards the main watershed, is very wet underfoot and the heather makes progress even more laborious. There are views east to the Helvellyn range and westward over the main ridge to the higher fells where a great sweep from Grisedale Pike to Bowfell can be seen. Fisher Crag presents a better viewpoint for Thirlmere.

== Ascents ==
To quote Wainwright "walkers of a contrary turn of mind will summarily reject the advice to leave Armboth Fell well alone, and may indeed be strengthened in their determination to climb it."

From the public car park at Armboth a track can be followed up the south bank of Fisher Gill. This leads into the trees, emerging behind Fisher Crag. From here on there is no path.

Launchy Gill does not provide access to the open fell, the forest fence being a substantial barrier, but from further south at the Dob Gill car park the bridleway to Watendlath can be used to gain the main ridge between Ullscarf and High Tove, before striking north to the summit.

== Protected Area ==
Armboth Fells was designated as a Site of Special Scientific Interest (SSSI) in 1986 because of the high altitude woodland present that includes birch and hazel within the 2,347.28 hectares (5,800.3 acres; 9.0629 sq mi) site. Part of the land area designated as Armboth Fells SSSI is owned by United Utilities and part is owned by the National Trust. Cumbria Wildlife Trust has been involved in peatland restoration within this protected area.

== Panorama ==
The following Wainwrights are visible on a clear day from the highest point of the fell at 479 metres:

1. Raven Crag, 11.5°, 1.8 mi (2.9 km)
2. Blencathra, 11.9°, 7.5 mi (12.1 km)
3. Souther Fell, 22.8°, 9.0 mi (14.5 km)
4. Clough Head, 28.5°, 4.7 mi (7.6 km)
5. Great Dodd, 43.6°, 4.0 mi (6.4 km)
6. Watson's Dodd, 46.4°, 3.3 mi (5.3 km)
7. Stybarrow Dodd, 56.4°, 3.4 mi (5.5 km)
8. Raise, 72.0°, 3.0 mi (4.8 km)
9. White Side, 79.6°, 2.6 mi (4.2 km)
10. Helvellyn, 99.2°, 2.8 mi (4.5 km)
11. Nethermost Pike, 109.6°, 3.1 mi (5.0 km)
12. Dollywaggon Pike, 119.6°, 3.6 mi (5.8 km)
13. Fairfield, 123.4°, 4.6 mi (7.4 km)
14. Seat Sandal, 132.6°, 4.0 mi (6.4 km)
15. Heron Pike, 141.4°, 6.0 mi (9.7 km)
16. Stone Arthur, 142.1°, 5.2 mi (8.4 km)
17. Nab Scar, 145.2°, 6.5 mi (10.5 km)
18. Steel Fell, 154.0°, 3.3 mi (5.3 km)
19. Ullscarf (summit not seen), 187.1°, 2.4 mi (3.9 km)
20. Bowfell, 207.8°, 6.7 mi (10.8 km)
21. Esk Pike, 214.6°, 6.5 mi (10.5 km)
22. Allen Crags, 218.1°, 5.9 mi (9.5 km)
23. Glaramara, 221.8°, 4.7 mi (7.6 km)
24. Great End, 222.0°, 6.4 mi (10.3 km)
25. Rosthwaite Fell, 227.0°, 3.2 mi (5.1 km)
26. Lingmell, 227.5°, 7.3 mi (11.7 km)
27. Great Gable, 235.8°, 6.4 mi (10.3 km)
28. Green Gable, 236.4°, 6.1 mi (9.8 km)
29. Base Brown, 237.0°, 5.3 mi (8.5 km)
30. Kirk Fell, 240.8°, 7.2 mi (11.6 km)
31. Brandreth, 243.0°, 5.7 mi (9.2 km)
32. Grey Knotts, 245.9°, 5.4 mi (8.7 km)
33. Pillar, 252.2°, 8.2 mi (13.2 km)
34. Haystacks, 253.9°, 6.7 mi (10.8 km)
35. Dale Head, 264.1°, 4.6 mi (7.4 km)
36. High Spy, 271.3°, 3.9 mi (6.3 km)
37. Hindscarth, 273.0°, 5.1 mi (8.2 km)
38. Wandope, 288.3°, 7.2 mi (11.6 km)
39. Grasmoor, 289.2°, 8.0 mi (12.9 km)
40. Crag Hill, 291.9°, 7.0 mi (11.3 km)
41. High Tove, 304.2°, 0.6 mi (0.97 km)
42. High Seat, 336.5°, 1.4 mi (2.3 km)
43. Skiddaw Little Man, 344.8°, 7.6 mi (12.2 km)
44. Lonscale Fell, 353.3°, 7.0 mi (11.3 km)
45. Great Calva, 356.9°, 9.5 mi (15.3 km)
46. Knott, 358.9°, 10.6 mi (17.1 km)

The Wainwright summit at 475 metres has the same panorama minus Nab Scar, Esk Pike, Allen Crags, Rosthwaite Fell, Base Brown and Skiddaw Little Man, but adding Maiden Moor, Sail, Whiteside, Scar Crags, Hopegill Head and Grisedale Pike.
