= High Seat =

High Seat can refer to one of two hills in England:

- High Seat, Lake District, a 608 m hill in the central part of the Lake District
- High Seat, Yorkshire Dales, a 709 m hill in the Yorkshire Dales.
