= Raven Crag =

Mountain in the English Lake District, Cumbria, England

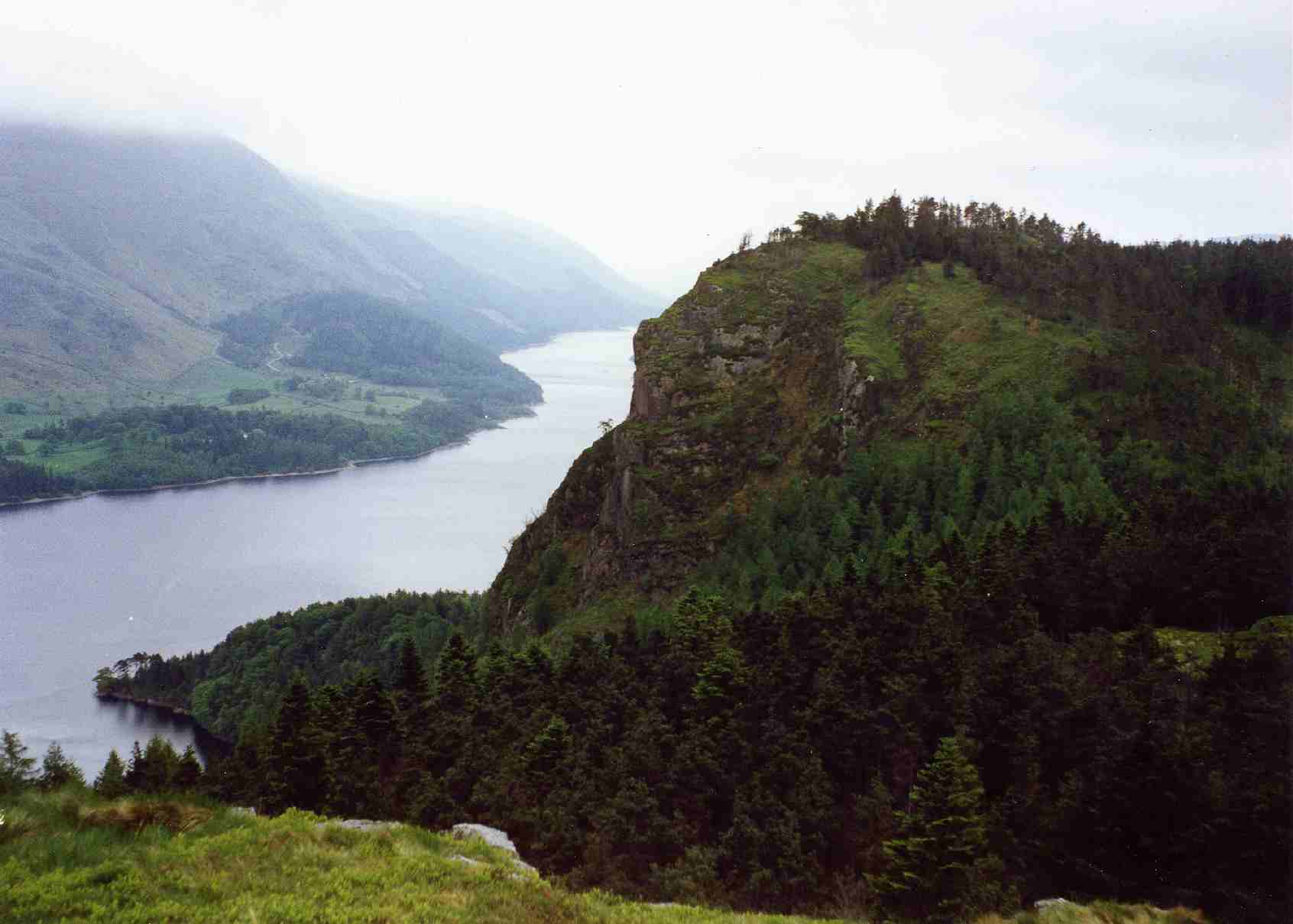
- Raven Crag and Thirlmere seen from Benn Man 300 metres to the north.

Highest point
- Elevation: 461 m (1,512 ft)
- Prominence: c. 45 m
- Parent peak: High Seat
- Listing: Wainwright
- Coordinates: 54°33′35″N 3°04′40″W

Geography
- Location within the Lake District
- Location: Cumbria, England
- Parent range: Lake District, Central Fells
- OS grid: NY304188
- Topo map: OS Explorer OL4

Raven Crag is a fell in the English Lake District that overlooks Thirlmere reservoir. It has subsidiary summits The Benn and Castle Crag.

== Topography ==
The fell is the high point on a 2-mile-long spur running up the western shore of Thirlmere, branching off from the main ridge of the central fells just east of High Tove. Subsidiary tops include The Benn (also known as Benn Man, 1,463 feet (446 m)) and Castle Crag (1,381 feet (421 m)), the site of an Iron Age settlement. The ridge has been extensively planted with conifers as part of the Thirlmere Forest, the face of Raven Crag appearing as a lone oasis of naked rock amid the trees.

Raven Crag is bordered to the west by the long valley of Shoulthwaite Gill, which is a tributary of the River Greta. To the north the ridge drops to a depression, crossed by the Keswick–Ambleside road, before climbing again onto High Rigg.

== Geology ==
Raven Crag and the Benn exhibit rock of the Birker Fell Formation, composed of plagioclase-phyric andesite lavas with subordinate sills. Between the two is an area of garnet bearing porphyritic andesite. Castle Crag Fort overlays volcaniclastic sandstone.

== Ascents ==
The main face of the fell stands over Thirlmere Dam, and appears from there as a sheer 500 feet (150 m) crag, the higher fells behind being hidden by the ridge. Raven Crag is most commonly climbed from the dam, via a steep waymarked path through the forestry. This ends with made paths and some short sections of boardwalk. The ridge between Raven Crag and High Tove can also be gained from Armboth, or an ascent can be made from 'behind' via Shoulthwaite. This can include visits to The Benn and the earth ramparts of Castle Crag.

== Summit ==
The highest point is an outcrop of rock with a small cairn, partially screened by conifers. The view from the summit is limited by the trees, but the eastward panorama opens up from the brink of the crag itself and there is an aerial view of the Thirlmere dam. The reservoir is also seen end on to the south. The Benn and Castle Crag provide a close-up view of Raven Crag from the north.

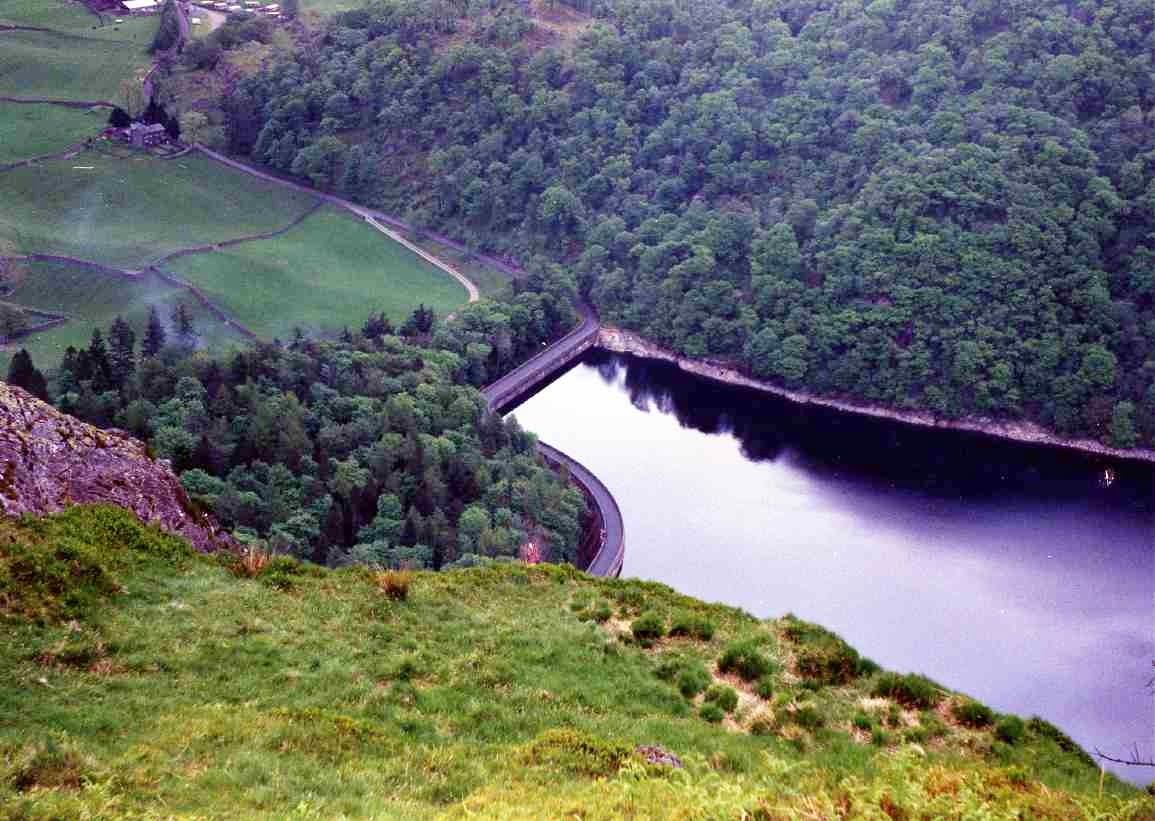
Looking down on the Thirlmere dam from the summit of Raven Crag.
