= Thirlmere Aqueduct =

Water supply in North West England

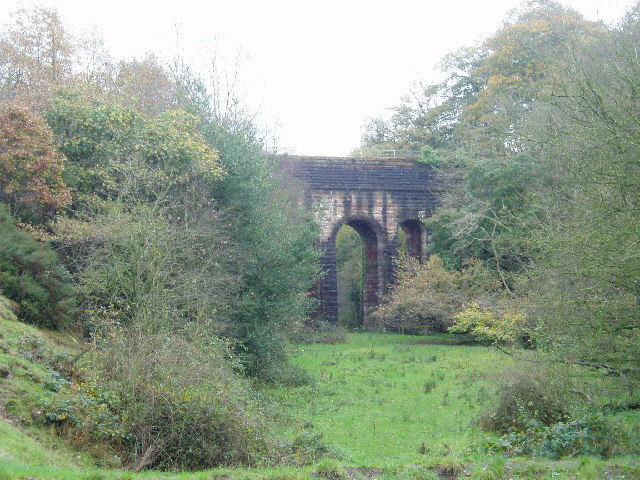
The aqueduct near Higher Wheelton

Interactive map of route

The Thirlmere Aqueduct is a 95.9-mile-long (154.3-kilometre-long) pioneering section of water supply system in England, built by the Manchester Corporation Waterworks between 1890 and 1925. Often incorrectly thought of as one of the longest tunnels in the world, the aqueduct's tunnel section is not continuous.

The aqueduct was built to carry approximately 55,000,000 imperial gallons (250,000 m^{3}) per day of water from Thirlmere Reservoir to Manchester. The construction of the reservoir and aqueduct was authorised by the Manchester Corporation Waterworks Act 1879 (42 & 43 Vict. c. cxxvi). The first phase was completed in 1897 and, for the pipeline sections, subsequent phases were completed in 1925. The first water to arrive in Manchester from the Lake District was marked with an official ceremony on 13 October 1894.

The route of the reservoir passes through Lancashire and then enters Manchester through Salford and Trafford.

== History ==
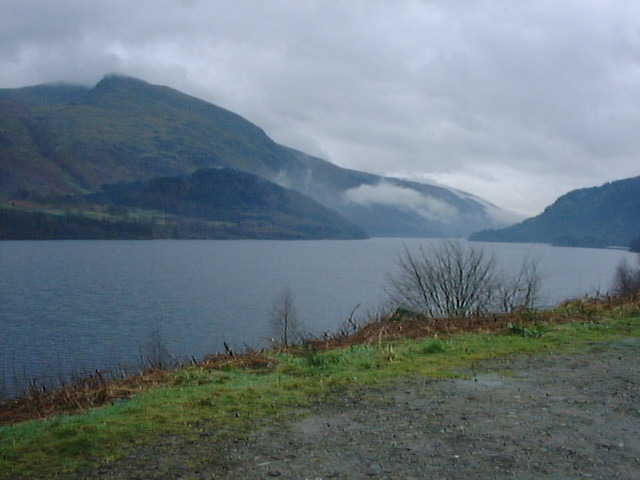
Thirlmere

In 1874 John Frederick Bateman advised Manchester Corporation that the increasing demand for water, then averaging 18,000,000 imperial gallons (82,000 m^{3}) per day, would soon exhaust the available supply from Longdendale. His first recommendation was to source water from Ullswater, but it was eventually decided to seek powers to acquire Thirlmere and build a dam there. In the face of local opposition the Manchester Corporation Waterworks Act 1879 (42 & 43 Vict. c. cxxvi) authorising the project received royal assent. Under this act Manchester was granted priority of right to 25 imperial gallons (110 L) per person per day.

== Thirlmere Dam ==
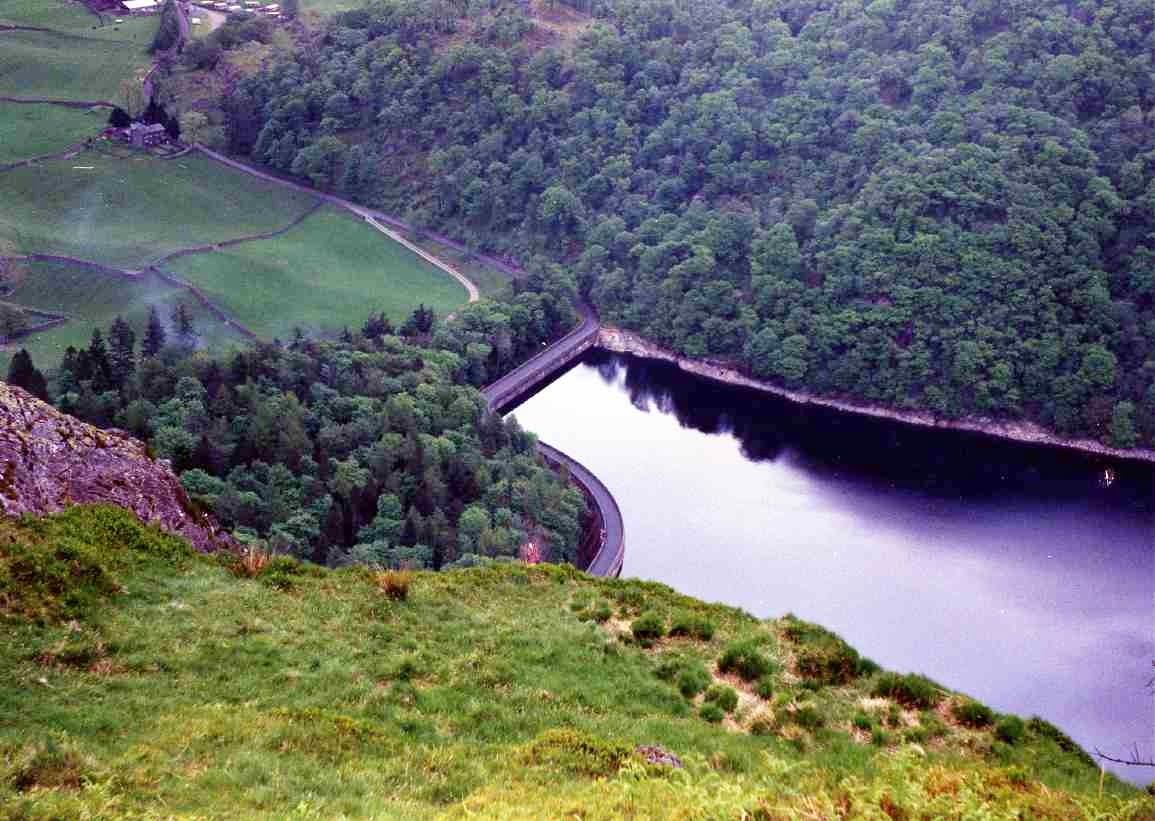
Thirlmere Dam

The dam at Thirlmere 54°33′41″N 3°04′05″W rises 64 feet (20 m) above the old stream bed, and the reservoir when full has a surface area of 814 acres (3.29 km^{2}), and a holding capacity of 8,235,000,000 imperial gallons (37,440,000 m^{3}) above the level to which water may be drawn (540 O.D.) The total dry-weather yield of Thirlmere Reservoir is reckoned at about 40,500,000 imperial gallons (184,000 m^{3}) per day, out of which compensation water in respect of the area now draining into the Lake 10,120 acres (41.0 km^{2}), amounting to 4,658,000 imperial gallons (21,180 m^{3}) per day average, is sent down the St. John's Beck. Manchester Corporation has acquired the drainage area of 10,800 acres (44 km^{2}) (in addition to other lands).

== Aqueduct technical data ==
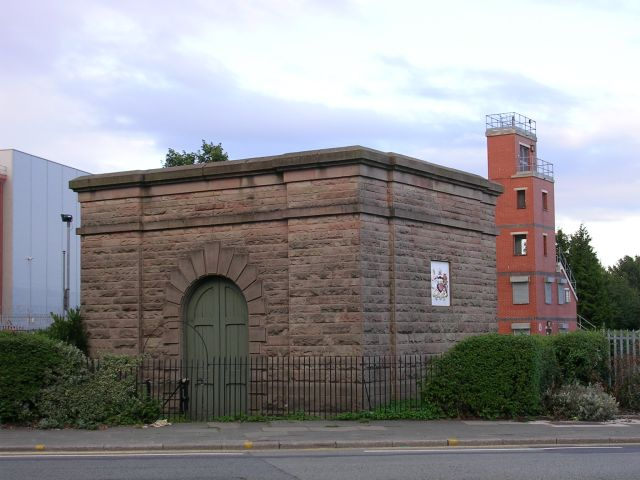
Valve house between the Kellogg's factory and the fire station in Stretford, near Manchester

The aqueduct is 95.9 miles long from Thirlmere reservoir to Heaton Park Reservoir 53°32′32″N 2°15′41″W, Prestwich. with 80 km of tunnels and 72 km of cast iron pipes. The most common form of tunnel construction making up 58 km of the length is cut-and-cover, which consists of a "D" section concrete covered channel, approximately 7.1 feet (2.2 m) wide and between 7.1 feet (2.2 m) and 7.9 feet (2.4 m) high. There are 37 miles (59.5 km) of cut and cover, made up of concrete horseshoe-shaped sections 12 inches (300 mm) thick. Typically, the conduit has 3 feet (0.91 m) of cover and traverses the contours of hillsides. The longest bored tunnel is the initial 6 km beneath Dunmail Raise, two teams digging from opposite sides of the mountain met within 20 cm of each other.

It is the longest gravity-fed aqueduct in the country, with no pumps along its route. The water flows at a speed of 4 miles per hour (6 km/h) and takes just over a day to reach the city. The level of the aqueduct drops by approximately 20 inches per mile (30 cm/km) of its length.

== Construction history ==
Sections of the route of the aqueduct have over time been modified for the construction of modern motorways. During the construction of the M6 and M61 connection a short section was diverted. A short section of the aqueduct near Worsley, Greater Manchester, was also re-routed in the late 1960s during the construction of the M62/M63/M602 motorway interchange.
