= Eagle Crag =

Mountain in Cumbria, England

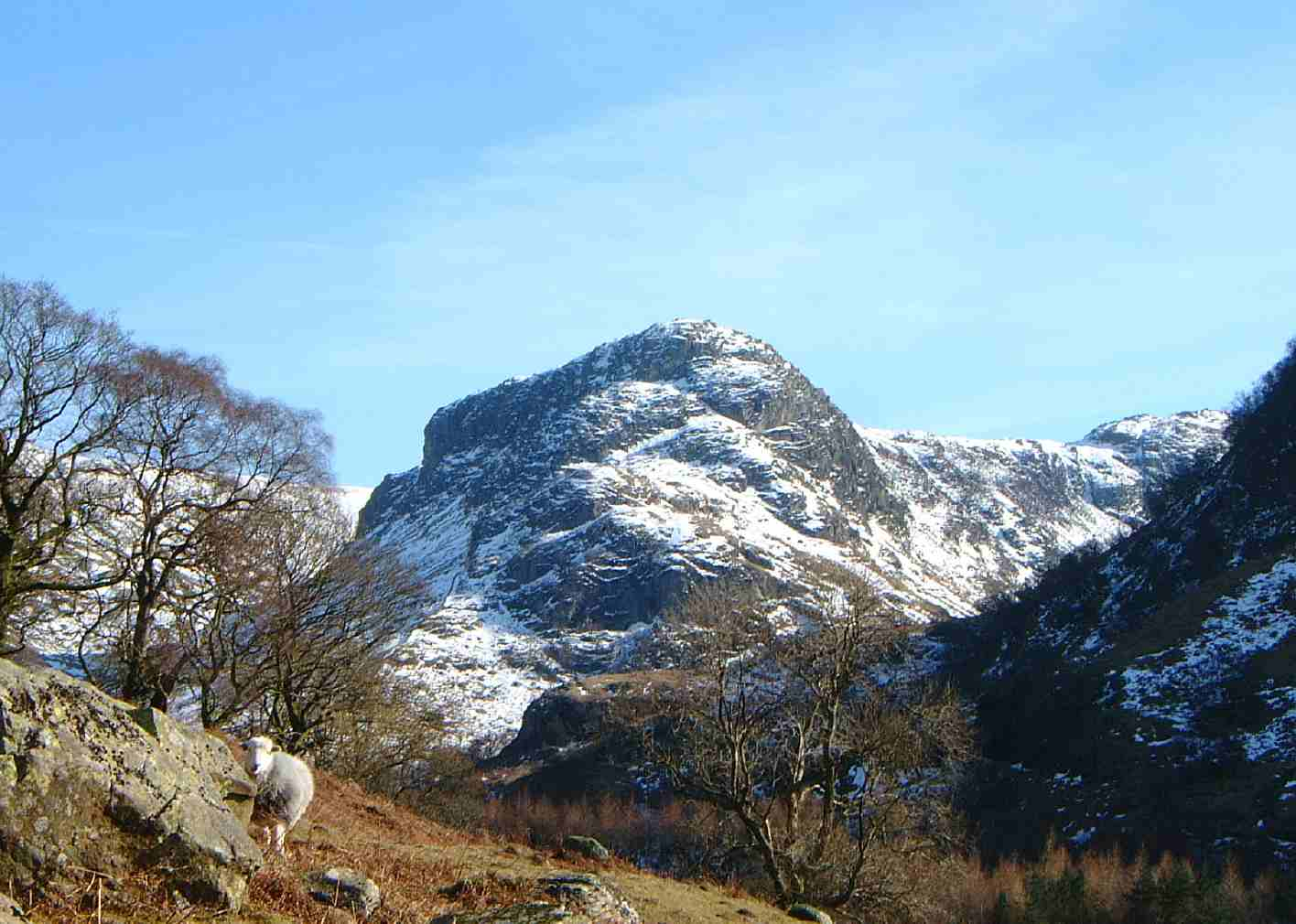
- Eagle Crag seen from the Stonethwaite valley

Highest point
- Elevation: c. 521 m (1,709 ft)
- Prominence: c. 25 m
- Parent peak: Sergeant's Crag
- Listing: Wainwright
- Coordinates: 54°29′56″N 3°07′15″W

Geography
- Location within the Lake District
- Location: Cumbria, England
- Parent range: Lake District, Central Fells
- OS grid: NY275121
- Topo map: OS Explorer OL4

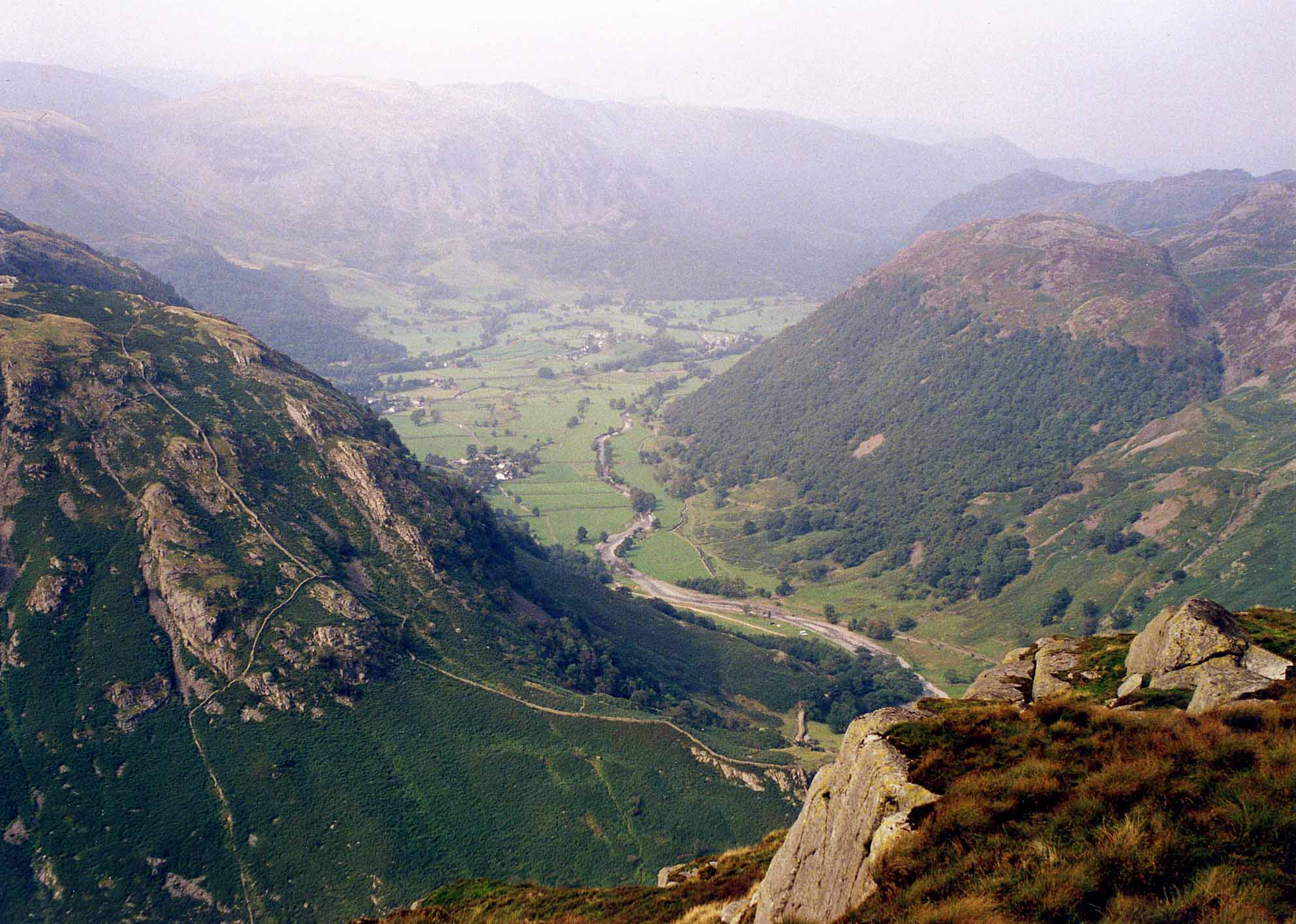
The view NW from the summit down the Stonethwaite valley.

Eagle Crag is a fell in the Lake District in Cumbria, England, it is situated near the village of Stonethwaite where the valleys of Langstrath and Greenup join. Impressive walls of crag look down upon Stonethwaite, making Eagle Crag the most arresting sight from that settlement. It can be climbed direct by the average walker, picking a route between the rock faces.

== Topography ==
The fell has not been given an official height by the Ordnance Survey and is given various heights by several other sources ranging between 520 and 525 metres. Bill Birkett gives the fell a height of 521 metres (1,709 feet) in his Complete Lakeland Fells. Alfred Wainwright gave the height at 1,650 feet (500 metres) approx in his Pictorial Guides to the Lakeland Fells in 1958, in which he writes:

Eagle Crag is so splendidly situated, so nobly proportioned and of so arresting appearance that it is a far worthier object than the parent fell (High Raise) rising behind.

Eagle Crag is part of the craggy termination of the northern ridge of the higher fell of High Raise and it presents a spectacular sight when viewed from the Stonethwaite valley. It is linked to Sergeant's Crag which is just under a kilometre away to the south by a ridge along which runs a dry stone wall which acts as navigation guide for walkers between the two tops.

== Geology ==
The summit area is formed of the welded rhyolitic lapilli tuff, tuff and breccia of the Crinkle Member. Patches of rhyolite outcrop lower down the slope.

== Summit ==
A small cairn marks the summit, balanced on a tilted slab of rock, with crags a few yards distant to west and north. A corner in the dry stone wall is a couple of minutes walk away southward. The view from the top of the fell is best to the north and west with Borrowdale and the Langstrath valley and the fells around them being well seen.

== Ascents ==
Eagle Crag is usually climbed from Stonethwaite; it can be combined with the higher fells of High Raise and Ullscarf as well as the nearby Sergeant's Crag. A direct ascent of the fell seems to be impossible when it is viewed from the Stonethwaite valley, with vertical walls of crags seemingly barring the way. However, a route can be found through the crags to attain the summit directly. Descents by this route are not recommended because of the dangerous crags which cannot be seen from above. An easier ascent follows the bridleway up Greenup Gill; this well-blazed trail is part of Wainwright's Coast to Coast Walk. The route leaves the bridleway at height of 330 metres and attains the fell by cutting back on itself and climbing steep grassy slopes to the summit.

== Rock climbing ==
The crags directly beneath the summit are used by rock climbers with climbs graded in the extreme and very severe categories.
