= Sergeant's Crag =

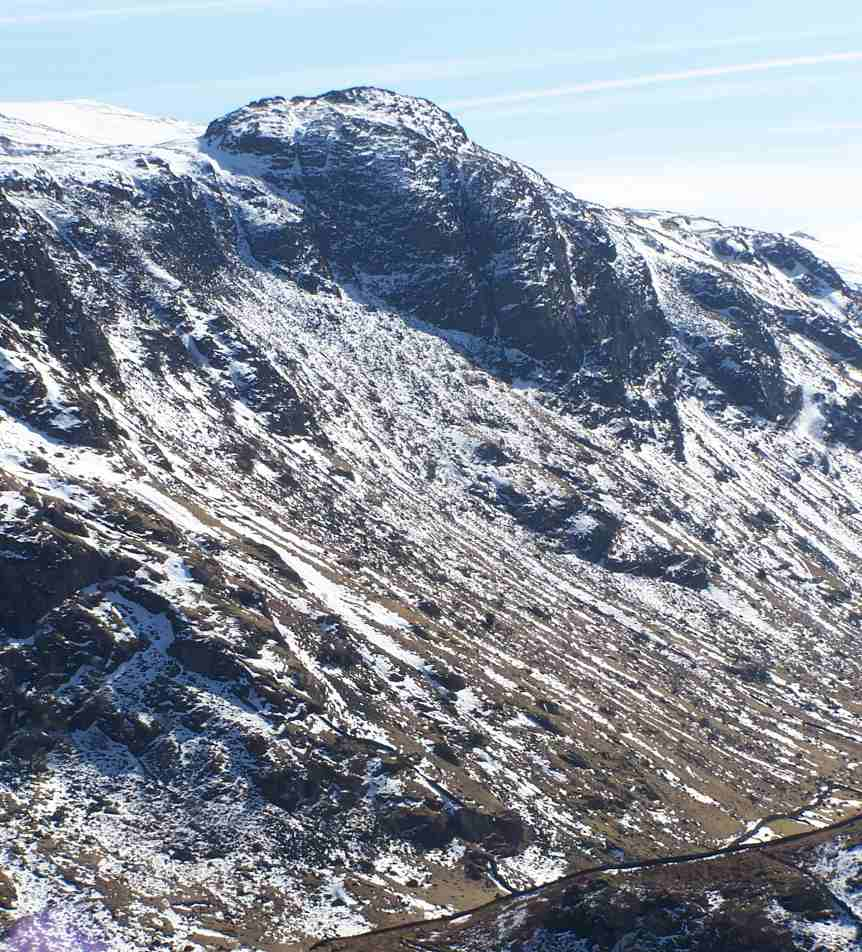
- Sergeant's Crag seen from above the Stonethwaite valley

Highest point
- Elevation: 571 m (1,873 ft)
- Prominence: c. 45 m (150 ft)
- Parent peak: High Raise
- Listing: Wainwright
- Coordinates: 54°29′34″N 3°07′20″W

Geography
- Location within the Lake District
- Location: Cumbria, England
- Parent range: Lake District, Central Fells
- OS grid: NY274114
- Topo map: OS Explorer OL4

Sergeant's Crag is a fell in the English Lake District. It is an intermediate height on the ridge between the Langstrath and Greenup valleys in the Central Fells.

== Topography ==
As the spur falling north from High Raise gradually narrows, the ground becomes rockier, until a sudden turn toward the east throws up a knuckle of crag. The main face is on the north western flank, cut by a gully, with the lower slabs providing the majority of the rock climbing. Bull crag is also on this flank, a little to the south. From Sergeant's Crag the ridge drops slightly before reaching its terminus at Eagle Crag.

Sergeant's Crag has well defined boundaries with Langstrath to the west and the gentler eastern slopes falling to Greenup Gill. These streams converge beneath Eagle Crag to form Stonethwaite Beck. Blea Rock is a conspicuous boulder at the foot of the Langstrath slopes.

== Geology ==
The face of the crag displays the pebbly sandstone and breccia of the Pavey Ark Member. The bulk of the fell is formed of the Seathwaite Formation, volcaniclastic sandstone with some conglomerates, breccia and andesite sills.

== Ascents ==
A stone wall runs along the ridge from Eagle Crag, the accompanying path being the usual route of ascent. This becomes indistinct as the ground broadens toward High Raise. The crag can also be outflanked, climbing without paths from further south along either valley.

== Summit ==
The top is partly hemmed in by the stone wall, a cairn resting on a rock platform. Bowfell and Esk Pike can be seen along Langstrath, with other high Southern Fells visible over Glaramara. High Raise and Ullscarf obstruct the eastward view, but there is a fine display of the North Western and Northern Fells.
