= Bleaberry Fell =

Mountain in Cumbria, England

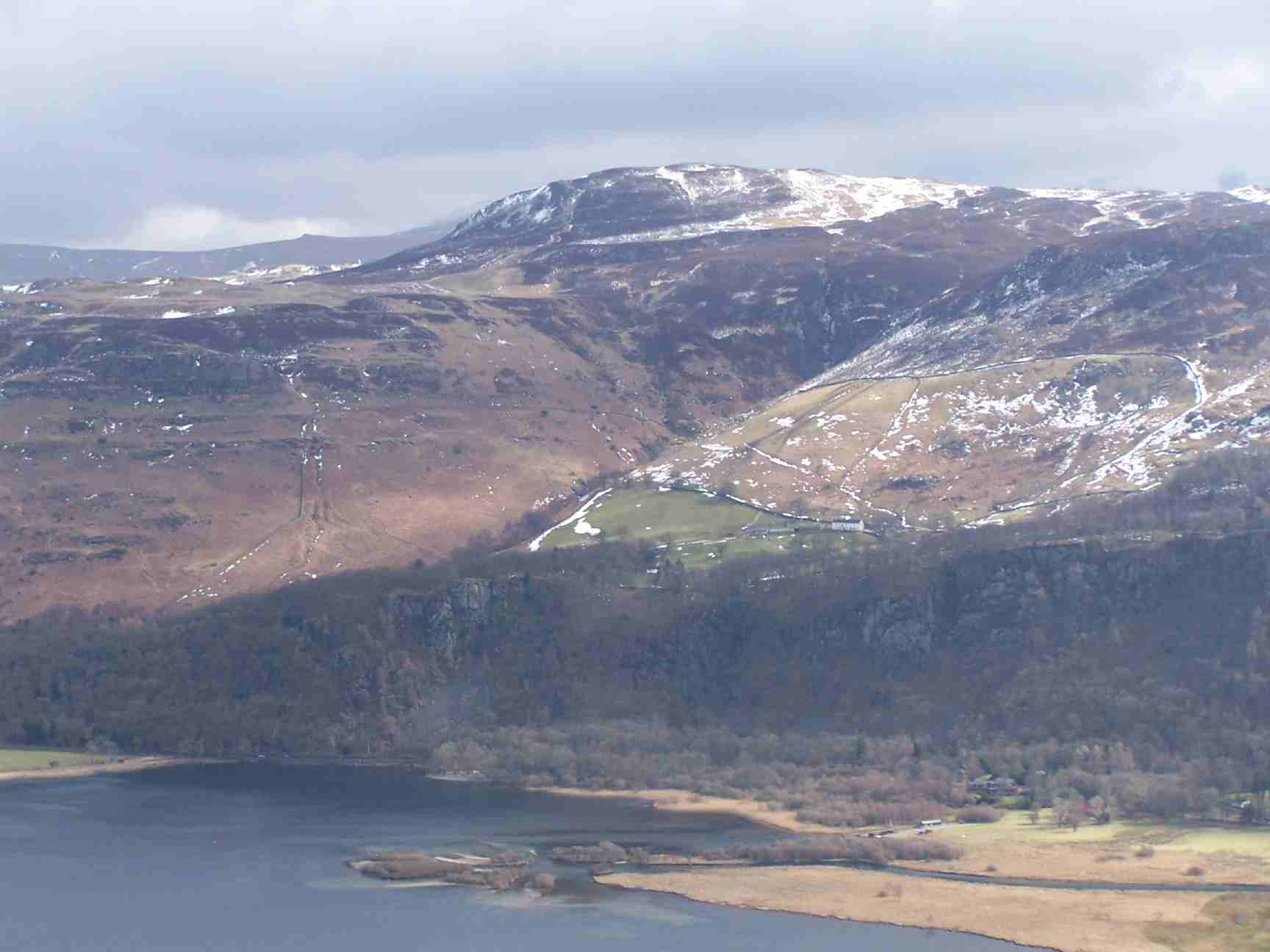
- Bleaberry Fell seen from Hause Gate on the opposite side of Derwent Water

Highest point
- Elevation: 590 m (1,936 ft)
- Prominence: 40 m (131 ft)
- Parent peak: High Seat
- Listing: Wainwright
- Coordinates: 54°33′56″N 3°06′26″W

Geography
- Location within the Lake District
- Location: Cumbria, England
- Parent range: Lake District, Central Fells
- OS grid: NY285195
- Topo map: OS Explorer OL4

Bleaberry Fell is a fell in the Lake District in Cumbria, England, with a height of 590 metres (1,936 ft). It stands on the main watershed between Borrowdale and Thirlmere and can be climbed from either flank. Walla Crag is a subsidiary top of Bleaberry Fell.

== Topography ==
Situated in the central area of the national park, four kilometres (2 1/2 miles) south of Keswick, Bleaberry Fell is the northernmost top on the ridge that separates the valleys containing the lakes of Derwent Water (Borrowdale) and Thirlmere. This ridge, which also contains the fells of High Seat and High Tove, is notoriously boggy underfoot, but Bleaberry Fell is mostly dry and the heather-covered summit gives an excellent all-round vista. To the east the fell has the rock faces of Iron Crag and Goat Crags as it falls away towards the Thirlmere valley.

== Ascents ==
The fell is usually climbed from the car park in Great Wood in Borrowdale, firstly ascending Walla Crag via Cat Gill and then continuing south-easterly for two kilometres (1 1/4 miles) to Bleaberry Fell which is clearly in view. The fell can also be climbed from Keswick, an 11-kilometre (7-mile) round trip, again going by Walla Crag. Walla Crag is in fact part of Bleaberry Fell, being the outlying north western crags, but is given the status of a separate fell by Lake District writers due to its excellent views and popularity.

Another possible starting point is the hamlet of Dale Bottom on the main Keswick to Ambleside road. It is possible to continue from Bleaberry Fell southerly along the ridge to take in the other Wainwright fells of High Seat and High Tove following a line of old fenceposts. This ridge is very boggy.

== Geology ==
The summit of the fell is representative of the Birker Fell Formation. This is composed of plagioclase-phyric andesite lavas and subordinate sills. To the south en route to High Seat are garnet-bearing porphyric andesite. Much of the northern section is overlain by peat and till.

== Summit ==
The top is heather-clad and carries a number of cairns. Bleaberry Fell's central position is rewarded by a fine all-round view, all of the major fell groups except for the High Street range being visible. Derwentwater can be brought into sight by moving to the north-west cairn.

The following Wainwrights are visible on a clear day:

No	Fell	Heading (°)	Distance (miles)
1	Knott	3.6	8.4
2	High Pike (Caldbeck)	11.2	9.8
3	Blencathra	24.1	5.6
4	Souther Fell	34.9	7.3
5	High Rigg	42.6	2.1
6	Clough Head	57.6	3.5
7	Great Dodd	79.4	3.5
8	Watson's Dodd	89.3	3.1
9	Stybarrow Dodd	95.5	3.6
10	Raise	110.0	3.8
11	Raven Crag	114.7	1.2
11	White Side	118.4	3.7
12	Catstycam	120.3	4.5
13	Helvellyn	127.4	4.4
14	Nethermost Pike	131.8	4.8
15	Dollywaggon Pike	136.3	5.5
16	Great Rigg	141.7	7.2
17	Seat Sandal	143.3	6.2
18	Nab Scar	149.6	8.8
19	Steel Fell	157.3	5.6
20	High Seat	170.4	0.9
21	Ullscarf	174.6	4.6
22	High Raise (Langdale)	181.8	6.2
23	Great Carrs	183.7	11.6
24	Pike of Stickle	184.5	7.6
25	Dow Crag	185.2	13.6
26	Grey Friar	186.7	12.1
27	Eagle Crag	186.9	4.7
28	Sergeant's Crag	187.2	5.2
29	Cold Pike	187.2	10.1
30	Crinkle Crags	193.2	9.4
31	Rossett Pike	196.1	7.8
32	Bowfell	196.4	8.6
33	Great Crag	196.9	3.2
34	Rosthwaite Fell	200.2	4.7
35	Esk Pike	201.2	8.1
36	Glaramara	202.6	6.2
37	Great End	207.0	7.9
38	Scafell Pike	208.7	8.8
39	Seathwaite Fell	209.7	7.1
40	Scafell	210.1	9.5
41	Grange Fell	211.6	2.4
42	Lingmell	212.9	8.5
43	Base Brown	215.8	6.3
44	Green Gable	217.7	7.1
45	Great Gable	218.0	7.4
46	Brandreth	222.0	6.5
47	Grey Knotts	223.3	6.1
48	Castle Crag	224.0	3.2
49	Kirk Fell	224.0	8.0
50	Red Pike (Wasdale)	232.4	9.3
51	Dale Head	235.0	4.7
52	High Spy	235.8	3.8
53	Pillar	236.0	8.5
54	High Crag	241.2	7.4
55	Hindscarth	245.5	4.8
56	High Stile	246.7	7.8
57	Robinson	251.2	5.5
58	Maiden Moor	253.2	3.2
59	Starling Dodd	254.1	9.2
60	Great Borne	257.9	10.3
61	Knott Rigg	264.6	5.5
62	Whiteless Pike	265.8	6.6
63	Wandope	270.1	6.1
64	Ard Crags	270.4	4.9
65	Catbells	272.9	2.6
66	Sail	273.7	5.4
67	Crag Hill	273.8	5.8
68	Scar Crags	277.1	4.8
69	Causey Pike	279.9	4.2
70	Whiteside (west top)	280.7	7.3
71	Outerside	283.3	4.8
72	Hopegill Head	283.6	6.4
73	Grisedale Pike	287.8	5.7
74	Barrow	289.9	3.9
75	Whinlatter	299.9	6.4
76	Lord's Seat	309.7	6.7
77	Barf	314.4	6.3
78	Sale Fell	316.9	8.5
79	Dodd	331.1	5.5
80	Walla Crag	331.9	1.2
81	Ullock Pike	334.9	6.3
82	Long Side	336.5	6.0
83	Carl Side	339.3	5.6
84	Skiddaw	344.2	6.1
85	Skiddaw Little Man	346.1	5.2
86	Latrigg	351.6	3.2
87	Lonscale Fell	358.9	4.7
