= Walla Crag =

Fell in the Lake District, England

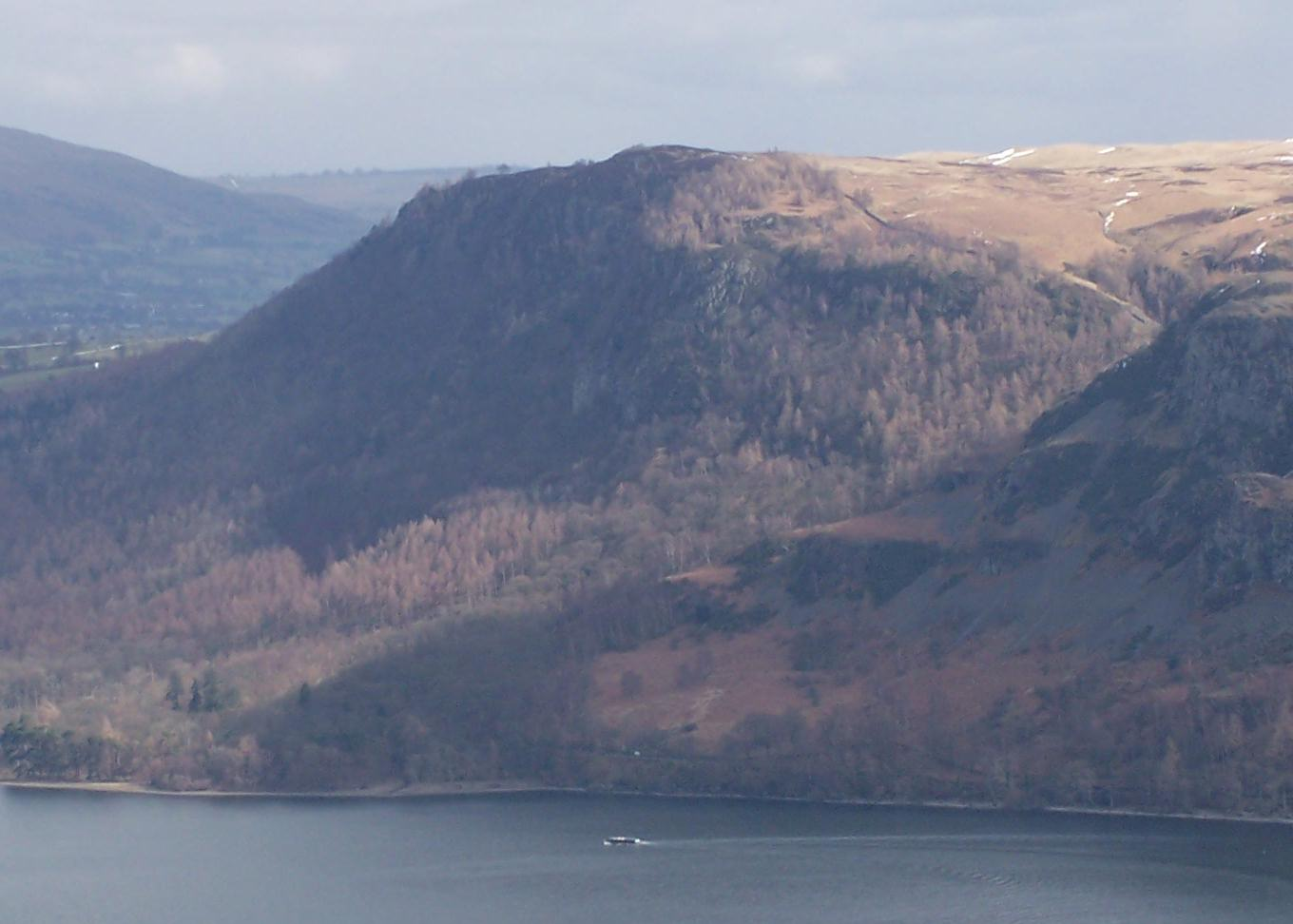
- Walla Crag from Hause Gate on the opposite side of Derwent Water

Highest point
- Elevation: 379 m (1,243 ft)
- Prominence: 24 m (79 ft)
- Parent peak: Bleaberry Fell
- Listing: Wainwright
- Coordinates: 54°34′51″N 3°07′18″W

Geography
- Location within the Lake District
- Location: Cumbria, England
- Parent range: Lake District, Central Fells
- OS grid: NY276212
- Topo map: OS Explorer OL4

Walla Crag is a fell in the English Lake District, near Keswick. The fell is a short walk from Keswick and overlooks Derwentwater.

== Topography ==
The crag is the terminal cliff on a short ridge running north west from Bleaberry Fell, dropping about 400 feet (120 metres) from the plateau above. Below this are further steep slopes before the gradient slackens on the shore of Derwentwater. The face is heavily wooded — mainly with conifers — almost to the top. The trees continue down through Great Wood to the lake. Walla Crag has one major breach, Lady's Rake.

The summit lies a little way back from the brink, the smooth heather-clad hinterland then dropping to the broad depression of Low Moss. Beyond here the ground rises again to Bleaberry Fell. The southern boundary of the fell is formed by Cat Gill, which flows west from Loss Moss to the lake. The gill separates Walla Crag from the neighbouring Falcon Crag, popular with rock climbers. Brockle Beck flows north from Low Moss, before turning west to enter Derwentwater at Strandshag Bay.

== Geology ==
The crag itself exposes the plagioclase-phyric andesite lavas of the Birker Fell Formation. The summit area is overlain by drift deposits.

== Summit ==
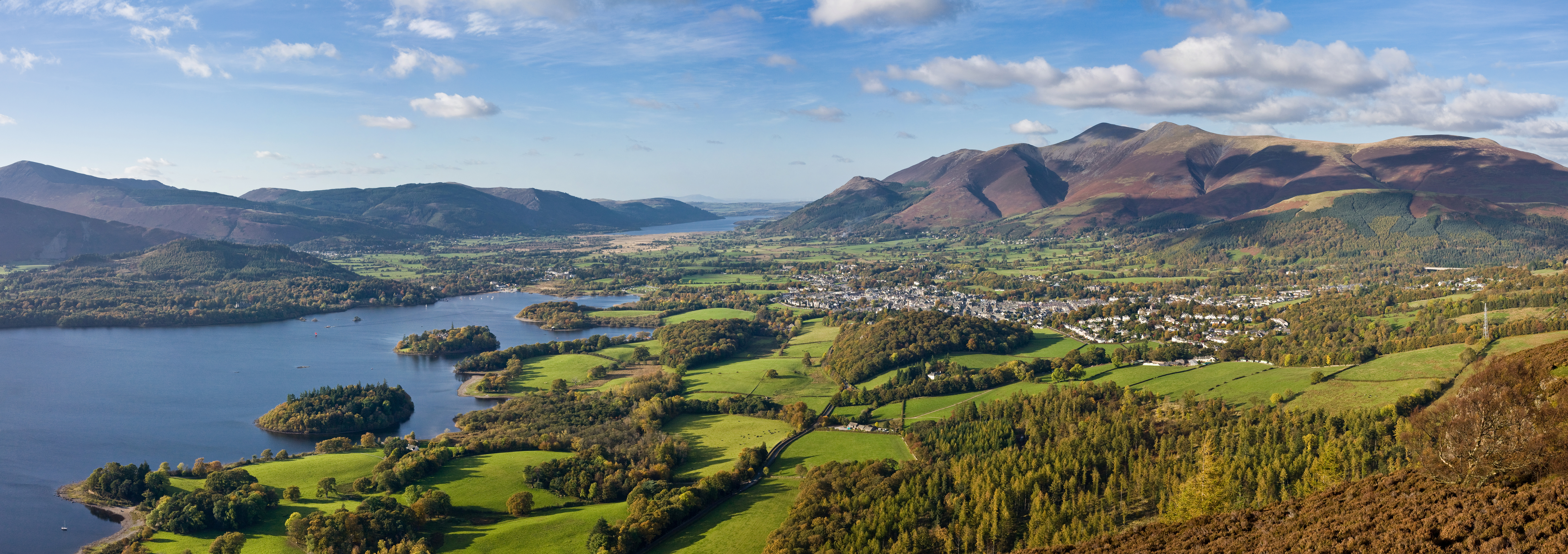
The view looking north towards Skiddaw, Derwent Water and Keswick

The top is marked by a large cairn and overlooks the islands of northern Derwentwater and the Vale of Keswick. There is also a clear line of sight down Borrowdale to the high fells.

== Ascents ==
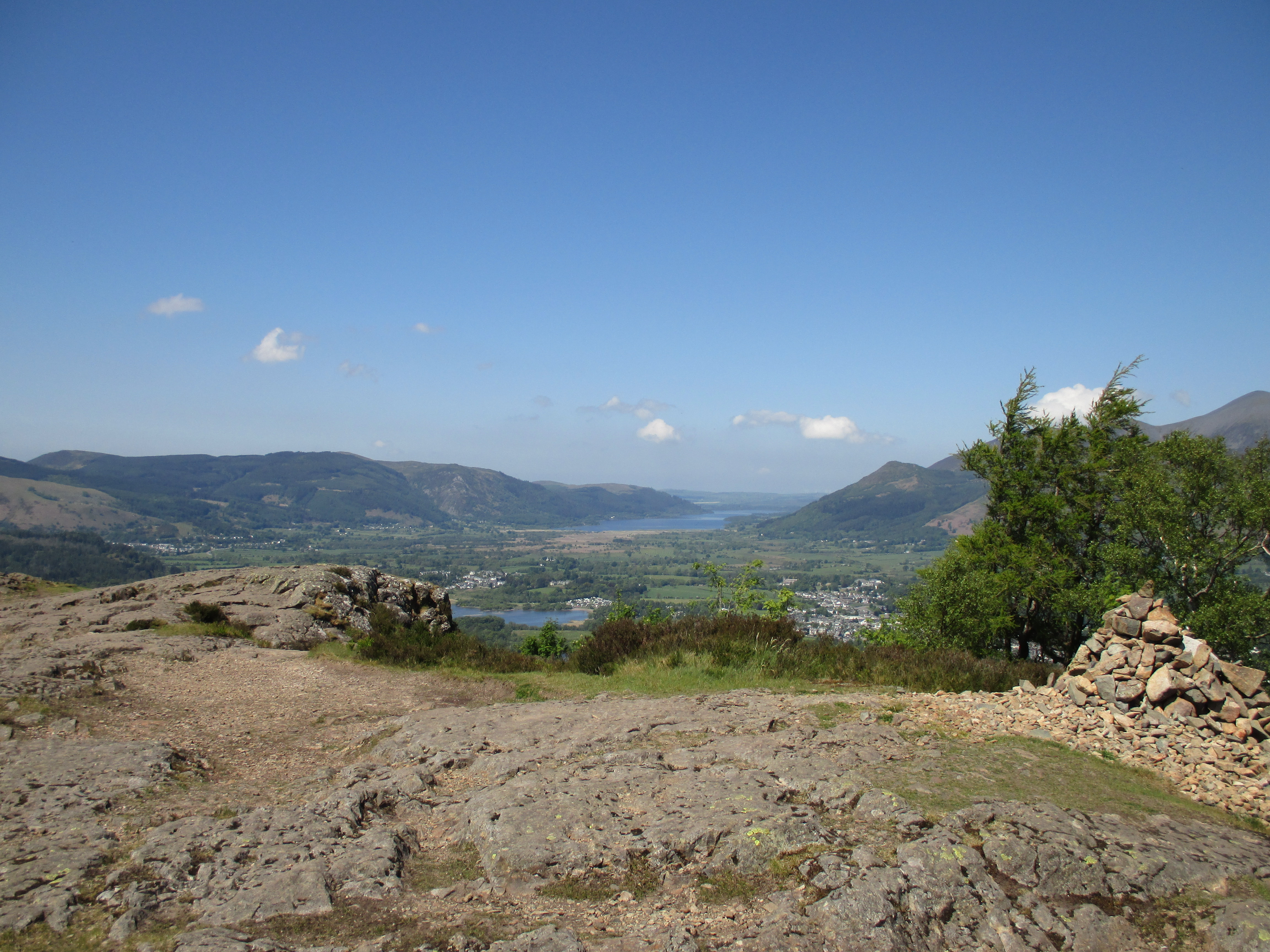
The summit

Walla Crag makes a half day or evening walk from Keswick and can be climbed via Brockle Beck, Great Wood (a traverse under the face) or Cat Gill. There is also a clear path from Bleaberry Fell.

== Height ==
Fellwalkers of an older generation found the height of Walla Crag an easily memorable 1,234 ft, much as Scafell Pike was once a simple 3,210 ft. More recent work by the Ordnance Survey has now elevated Walla Crag to 1,243 ft.

== Panorama ==
The following Wainwrights are visible on a clear day:

No	Fell	Heading (°)	Distance (miles)
1	Latrigg	2.5	2.1
2	Lonscale Fell	7.3	3.7
3	Mungrisdale Common	22.8	5.4
4	Blencathra	35.0	4.9
5	High Rigg	76.7	2.0
6	Clough Head	76.7	3.6
7	Great Dodd	95.6	4.1
8	Watson's Dodd	105.4	3.8
9	Stybarrow Dodd	108.6	4.4
10	Raise	119.6	4.8
11	White Side	126.3	4.8
12	Helvellyn	132.5	5.5
13	Bleaberry Fell	151.9	1.2
14	Crinkle Crags	188.8	10.4
15	Rosthwaite Fell	191.0	5.6
16	Bowfell	191.3	9.4
17	Grange Fell	192.8	3.2
18	Glaramara	195.0	7.0
19	Esk Pike	195.4	8.9
20	Allen Crags	196.6	8.3
21	Great End	200.5	8.6
22	Seathwaite Fell	202.2	7.8
23	Scafell Pike	202.7	9.5
24	Scafell	204.4	10.2
25	Lingmell	206.4	9.2
26	Castle Crag	206.4	3.7
27	Base Brown	206.9	6.9
28	Green Gable	209.5	7.6
29	Great Gable	210.1	7.9
30	Brandreth	212.8	7.0
31	Grey Knotts	213.4	6.6
32	High Spy	219.1	4.1
33	Dale Head	221.3	5.0
34	Hindscarth	231.2	4.8
35	Maiden Moor	231.4	3.2
36	Robinson	236.8	5.4
37	Red Pike (Buttermere)	242.4	8.1
38	Catbells	245.6	2.2
39	Starling Dodd	246.7	9.1
40	Knott Rigg	252.3	5.1
41	Whiteless Pike	255.7	6.2
42	Ard Crags	256.8	4.4
43	Wandope	259.2	5.6
44	Sail	261.8	4.9
45	Crag Hill	262.7	5.3
46	Scar Crags	263.9	4.3
47	Causey Pike	264.9	3.6
48	Outerside	270.6	4.1
49	Hopegill Head	274.6	5.7
50	Barrow	275.1	3.1
51	Grisedale Pike	278.2	4.9
52	Whinlatter	293.3	5.5
53	Lord's Seat	305.0	5.6
54	Barf	310.3	5.1
55	Sale Fell	314.5	7.3
56	Dodd	330.9	4.3
57	Ullock Pike	335.6	5.1
58	Long Side	337.6	4.8
59	Carl Side	341.2	4.4
60	Skiddaw (south top)	346.5	4.7
61	Skiddaw Little Man	350.2	4.1
