= Seatoller =

Hamlet in Cumbria, England

Coordinates: 54.513502°N 3.167238°W

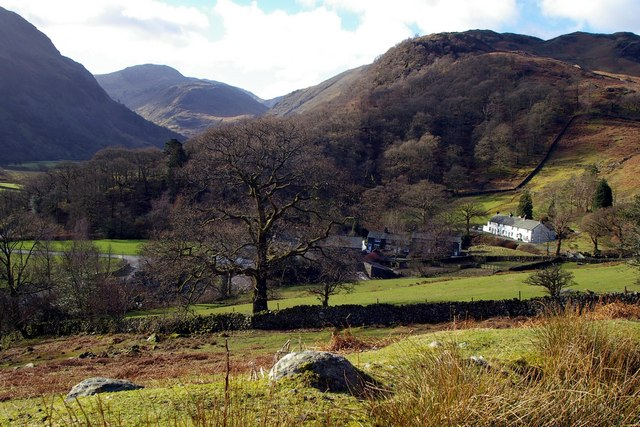
- The hamlet, viewed from High Doat

- Location in Allerdale, Cumbria Location within the United Kingdom
- OS grid reference: NY244137
- Civil parish: Borrowdale
- Unitary authority: Cumberland
- Ceremonial county: Cumbria
- Country: England
- Sovereign state: United Kingdom
- Post town: KESWICK
- Postcode district: CA12
- Dialling code: 017687
- UK Parliament: Penrith and Solway

Seatoller is a hamlet in the civil parish of Borrowdale, in Cumbria, England. Part of the historic county of Cumberland, it lies on the B5289 road at the east foot of the Honister Pass and to the south of Derwent Water. The nearest town is Keswick, which lies approximately 7 miles (11 km) to the north.

== Governance ==
Along with Seathwaite, Watendlath, Stonethwaite, Rosthwaite and Grange, Seatoller forms part of the Borrowdale civil parish, which has its own parish council.

The hamlet lies within the Penrith and Solway parliamentary constituency; the current MP is Markus Campbell-Savours, who represents Labour.

== Amenities ==
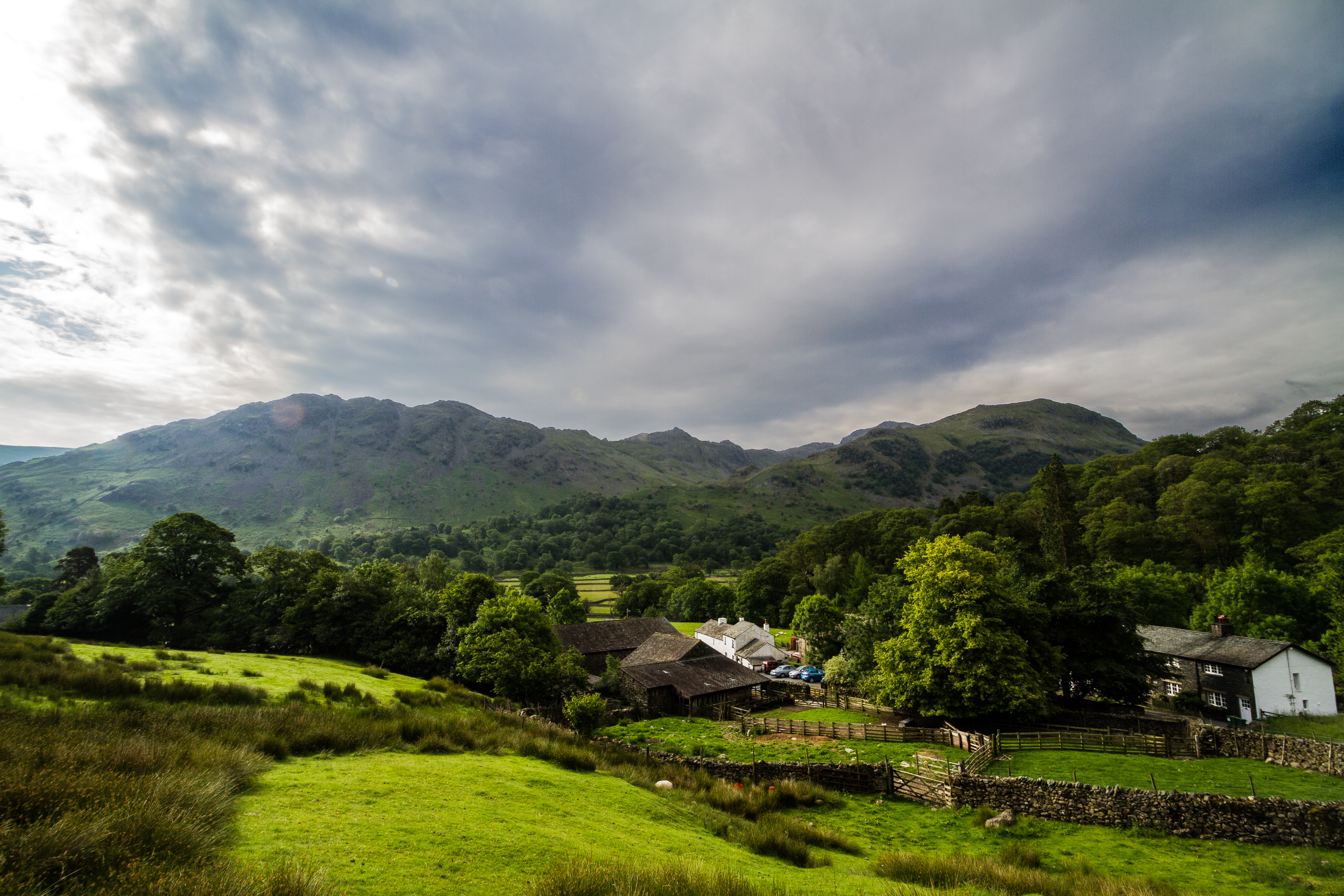
A view of Seatoller from above

The hamlet consists of a farmhouse, two bed and breakfasts, a tea shop and two rows of cottages.

Close to Seatoller is the hamlet of Stonethwaite, which has Borrowdale Primary School and St Andrews Church.

== Tourism and the local economy ==
Seatoller is a popular place from which to start the ascent of Great Gable and Scafell Pike, the highest mountain in England. There is a National Trust car park in the hamlet, which is an excellent starting point for walks.

Honister Slate Mine is located at the head of the Honister Pass and produces the world famous Westmorland Green Slate.

== Transport ==
Stagecoach Cumbria and North Lancashire operates three bus routes that link the hamlet with Keswick and Cockermouth.

== See also ==
- Listed buildings in Borrowdale
