= Tour of the Lake District =

Walking route in England

Tour of the Lake District is an 88–93-mile (142–150 km) walking route through the English Lake District. There are five optional sections giving high-level routes over major summits and lower-level alternatives. It is not waymarked, but is recognised by the Long Distance Walkers Association, and by several commercial companies which offer packaged walking holidays over the route.

It is a circular route described going clockwise from its south-eastern point, Windermere. It passes through Ambleside and Coniston, and on via Eskdale, reaching its furthest west on the way to Wasdale. It uses the Black Sail Pass to reach Buttermere, and follows the Newlands Valley, to reach its furthest north point at Keswick. It then heads south along Borrowdale to Rosthwaite and crosses the fells to Grasmere and then to Patterdale, returning south to Windermere.
