= Seathwaite, Cumberland =

Hamlet in Cumbria, England

Seathwaite
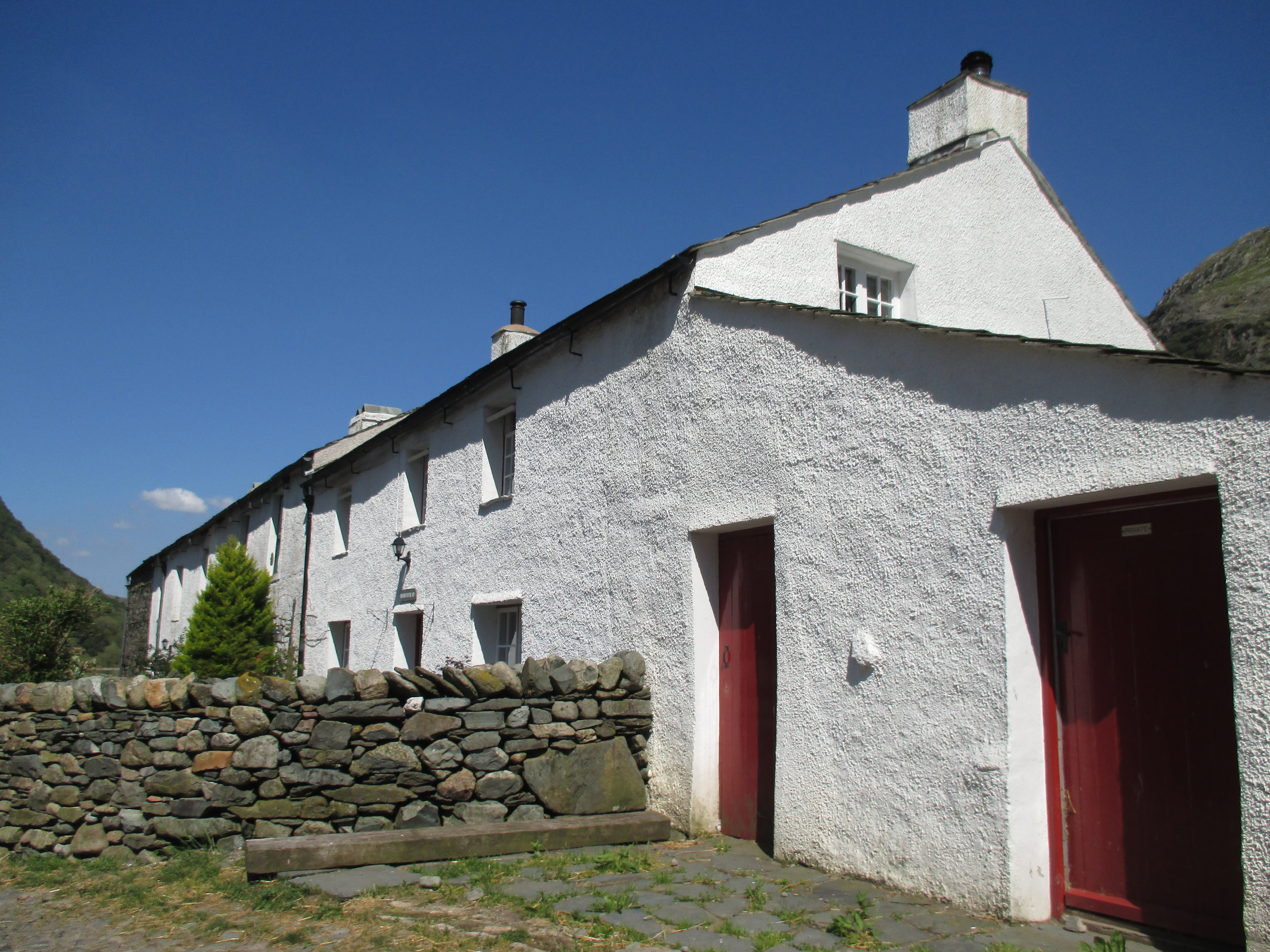

- Location within Cumbria
- OS grid reference: NY233118
- Civil parish: Borrowdale
- Unitary authority: Cumberland
- Ceremonial county: Cumbria
- Region: North West
- Country: England
- Sovereign state: United Kingdom
- Post town: KESWICK
- Postcode district: CA12
- Dialling code: 017687
- Police: Cumbria
- Fire: Cumbria
- Ambulance: North West
- UK Parliament: Penrith and Solway

Seathwaite (/ˈsiːθweɪt/ SEE-thwayt) is a small hamlet in the Borrowdale civil parish of Cumberland, Cumbria, North West England. It is in the Lake District near Scafell Pike and 8 miles (13 km) southwest of Keswick at the end of a minor road that heads southwest from the hamlet of Seatoller, which is where the B5289 road begins its steep climb up the pass to Honister Hause on the boundary between Borrowdale civil parish and Buttermere civil parish.

The nearby Seathwaite Fell takes its name from the hamlet and lies about 1.1 miles (2 km) to the south-southwest of it. The name derives from a combination of the Old Norse words sef (sedges) and thveit (clearing) and may be taken to mean "clearing in the sedges". The name, then spelled Seuthwayt, first appeared in written records in 1340.

== History ==
Along the nearby Newhouse Gill, which descends from Grey Knotts, is a graphite mine which was opened after the discovery of graphite there in 1555. The extracted graphite was eventually used to supply the Derwent Cumberland Pencil Company factory in Keswick. The commercial mining of the unusual solid form of graphite found near the hamlet of Seathwaite ceased around 1891 when veins of the solid graphite became harder to find. In addition, around that time the Keswick pencil factories had switched to making pencil pigments out of the familiar combination of clay powder and graphite powder. Graphite powder could be mined and imported from elsewhere. The mine entrance is north-northwest of the hamlet at 54°30′18.01″N 3°11′13.01″W.

For many years Seathwaite was a secluded spot, being connected to the main road at Seatoller by a rough track. However the emergence of fellwalking as an outdoor activity at the end of the 19th century led to the hamlet becoming a popular starting point for walkers bound for the surrounding mountains. The road was eventually surfaced, which led to motorists parking their cars along the verges on the approach to the farm. Seathwaite has become one of the most popular starting points for walking in the UK since it gives access to well-known mountains such as Scafell Pike, Great Gable and Glaramara. Famed Lakeland walker Alfred Wainwright made this comment:

Seathwaite, once in a little world of its own with few visitors, has become a pedestrian metropolis. Great days on the fells begin and end here.

== Governance ==
Seathwaite is within the Penrith and Solway UK Parliamentary constituency.

For Local Government purposes it is administered by Cumberland Council.

Seathwaite is parished; Borrowdale Parish Council.

== Climate ==
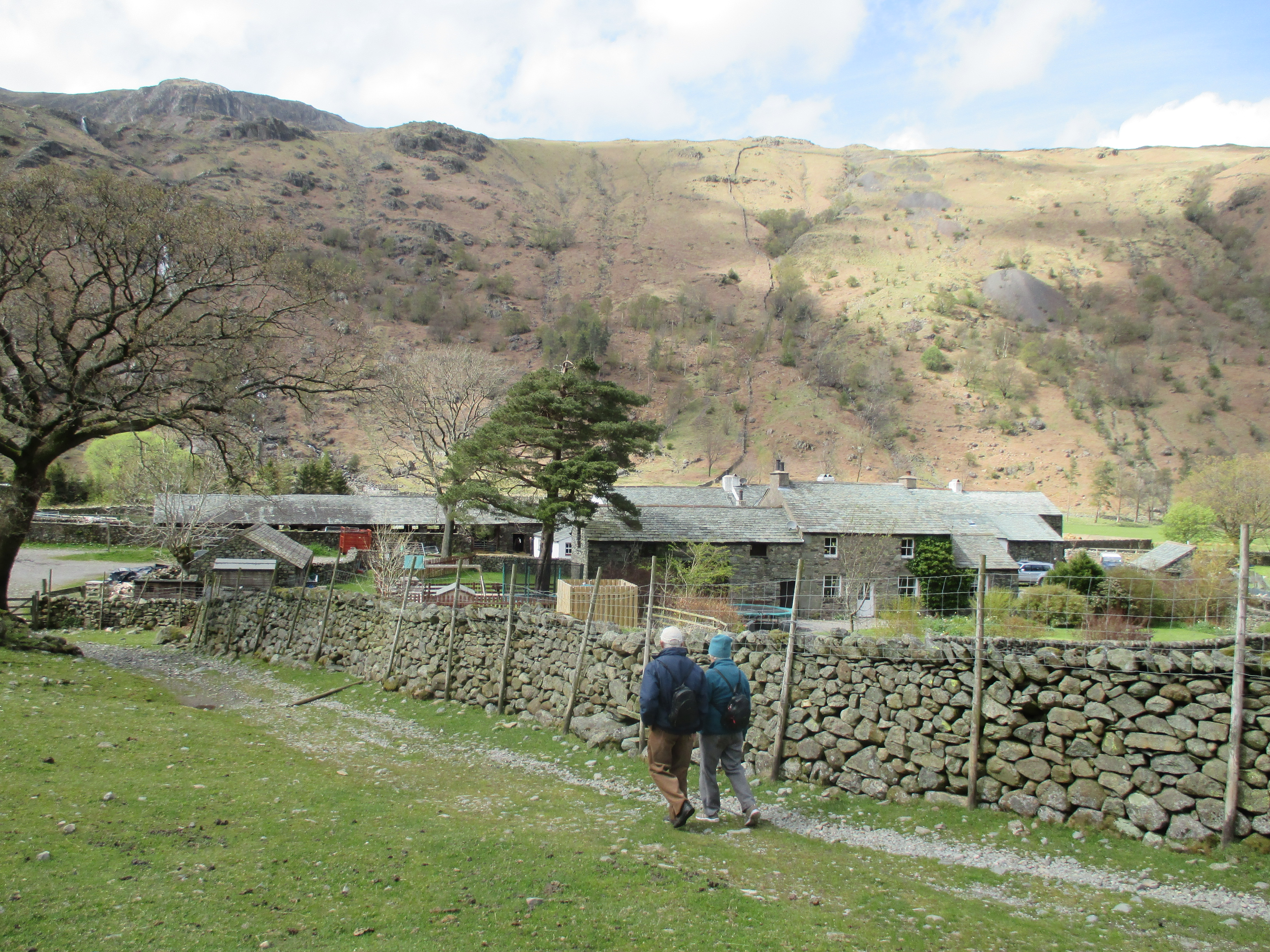
The village of Seathwaite seen from the east.

In 2008 Seathwaite was the wettest inhabited place in the United Kingdom and received around 3,552 millimetres (140 in) of rain per year. In September 1966, 130 millimetres (5 in) of rain fell on Seathwaite and the surrounding fells in an hour, the resulting flood severely damaging the nearby Stockley Bridge, which lies 1,097 metres (1,200 yd) south of the hamlet. Stockley Bridge is an ancient packhorse bridge on the old route between Borrowdale and the Cumbrian coast. The bridge was widened in 1887 and had to be repaired after the 1966 storm. On 19–20 November 2009 Seathwaite received 314.4 millimetres (12.38 in) of rain in a 24-hour period, a major contributor to the 2009 Cumbria and southwest Scotland floods. This was a record for the amount of rain falling anywhere in the UK within 24 hours, until it was beaten by Honister Pass in December 2015.

== Borrowdale yews ==
The Borrowdale yews are a group of originally four yew trees William Wordsworth celebrated in his 1803 poem Yew Trees. The largest, Borrowdale Yew, is hollow, large enough for eight people to squeeze inside. They are located a few hundred metres north of the village, on the opposite side of the Gill. Borrowdale Yew was one of 50 trees selected by The Tree Council in 2002, named Great British Trees, in honour of the Golden Jubilee of Elizabeth II. One of the four original trees is now fallen.

== See also ==
- Listed buildings in Borrowdale
- Cumbrian placename etymology
