= Stonethwaite Beck =

River in Cumbria, England

Coordinates: 54.5282°N 3.1555°W

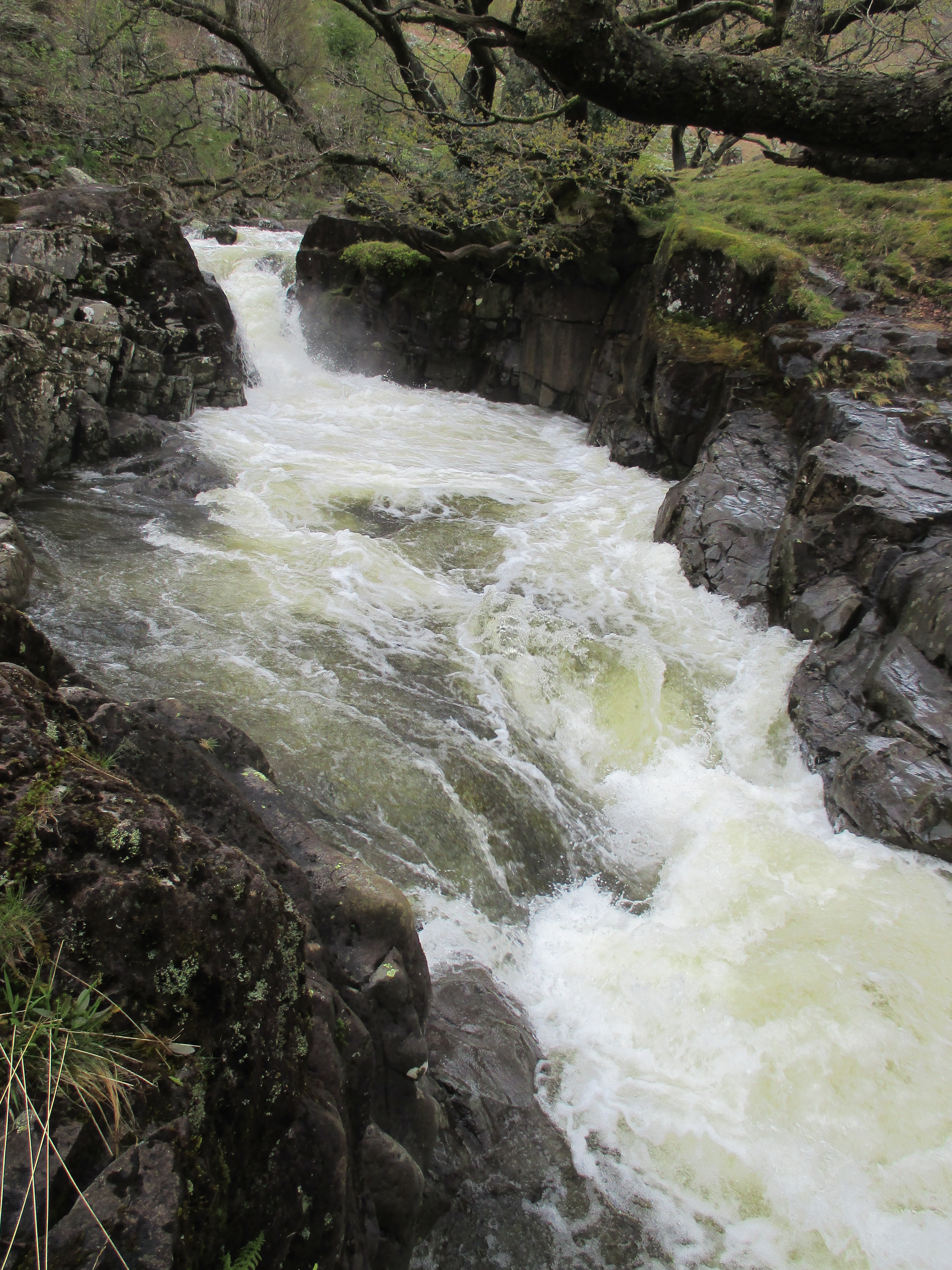
Galleny Force on Stonethwaite Beck

Stonethwaite Beck is a minor river in Cumbria, England. It is a tributary of the River Derwent.

Stonethwaite Beck is formed at the confluence of Langstrath Beck and Greenup Gill beneath Eagle Crag, at Smithymire Island. It continues north west and north through Galleny Force, past the villages of Stonethwaite and Rosthwaite, flowing into the Derwent in Borrowdale.
