= Castle Crag =

Hill in United Kingdom

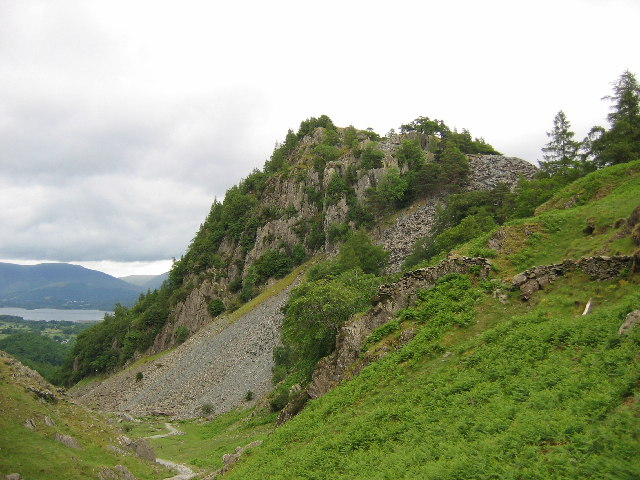
- Castle Crag from the south, with Derwent Water in the background

Highest point
- Elevation: 290 m (950 ft)
- Prominence: c. 75 m
- Parent peak: High Spy
- Listing: Wainwright
- Coordinates: 54°31′58″N 3°09′43″W

Geography
- Location within the Lake District
- Location: Cumbria, England
- Parent range: Lake District, North Western Fells
- OS grid: NY249159
- Topo map: OS Landranger 89, 90, Explorer OL4

Castle Crag is a hill in the North Western Fells of the English Lake District. It is the smallest hill included in Alfred Wainwright's influential Pictorial Guide to the Lakeland Fells, the only Wainwright below 1,000 feet (300 m).

Wainwright accorded Castle Crag the status of a separate fell because it "is so magnificently independent, so ruggedly individual, so aggressively unashamed of its lack of inches, that less than justice would be done by relegating it to a paragraph in the High Spy chapter." Subsequent guidebooks have not always agreed: Castle Crag is one of only two Wainwrights not included in Bill Birkett's Complete Lakeland Fells.

== Topography ==
The fell has an impressive appearance, a rugged height apparently blocking the valley of Borrowdale, which is squeezed between Castle Crag and Grange Fell, its neighbour on the other side. This narrow gorge known as the 'Jaws of Borrowdale', and is prominent in views from Keswick and Derwentwater.

High Spy, the parent fell, forms part of the north-south ridge between Borrowdale and the Newlands Valley. The rough spur of Low Scawdel at 1,709 feet (521 m) runs out due east from the summit, breaking steeply over Goat Crag and then falling to Broadslack Gill. This small tributary of the River Derwent separates High Spy from Castle Crag.

The wooded height of Castle Crag rises between Broadslack Gill and the Derwent, the two streams meeting to the north beneath the outlying knoll of Low Hows. It has steep faces on all sides except the south, where a low ridge runs out and then swings west around the head of Broadslack Gill. A narrow col here provides the topographic link to High Spy.

== Geology, quarrying and Millican Dalton ==
The Derwentwater fault runs along the valley of Broadslack Gill, the higher ground to the north west being mainly composed of the Birker Fell Formation. These are plagioclase-phyric andesite lavas and subordinate sills. By contrast Castle Crag shows outcropping of the Eagle Crag Member, a mixture of siltstone, sandstone, conglomerate and tuff with frequent andesite sills.

The slopes of Castle Crag are extensively quarried with pits and levels on the northern and south eastern flanks. The summit has also been extensively worked. The High Hows Quarry later achieved fame as the home of Millican Dalton, the eccentric and self-styled "Professor of Adventure". The caves here formed his summer home from the 1920s until shortly before his death in 1947.

== Summit ==
The summit area is believed to have been an ancient hill fort, although the western section has been sliced away by quarrying. It can only be gained by means of a sloping crack to the south. The very highest point is a rock outcrop about eight feet (2.5 metres) high and 12 feet (3.5 metres) across. A memorial to Borrowdale men killed in World War I is affixed to the outcrop.

== Ascents ==
Castle Crag may be ascended from the villages of Grange in Borrowdale or Rosthwaite, and can be combined with the riverside walk along the River Derwent. The Allerdale Ramble long distance walking route runs along the valley of Broadslack Gill, whilst the Cumbria Way crosses the eastern slopes of Castle Crag.

Views around Castle Crag

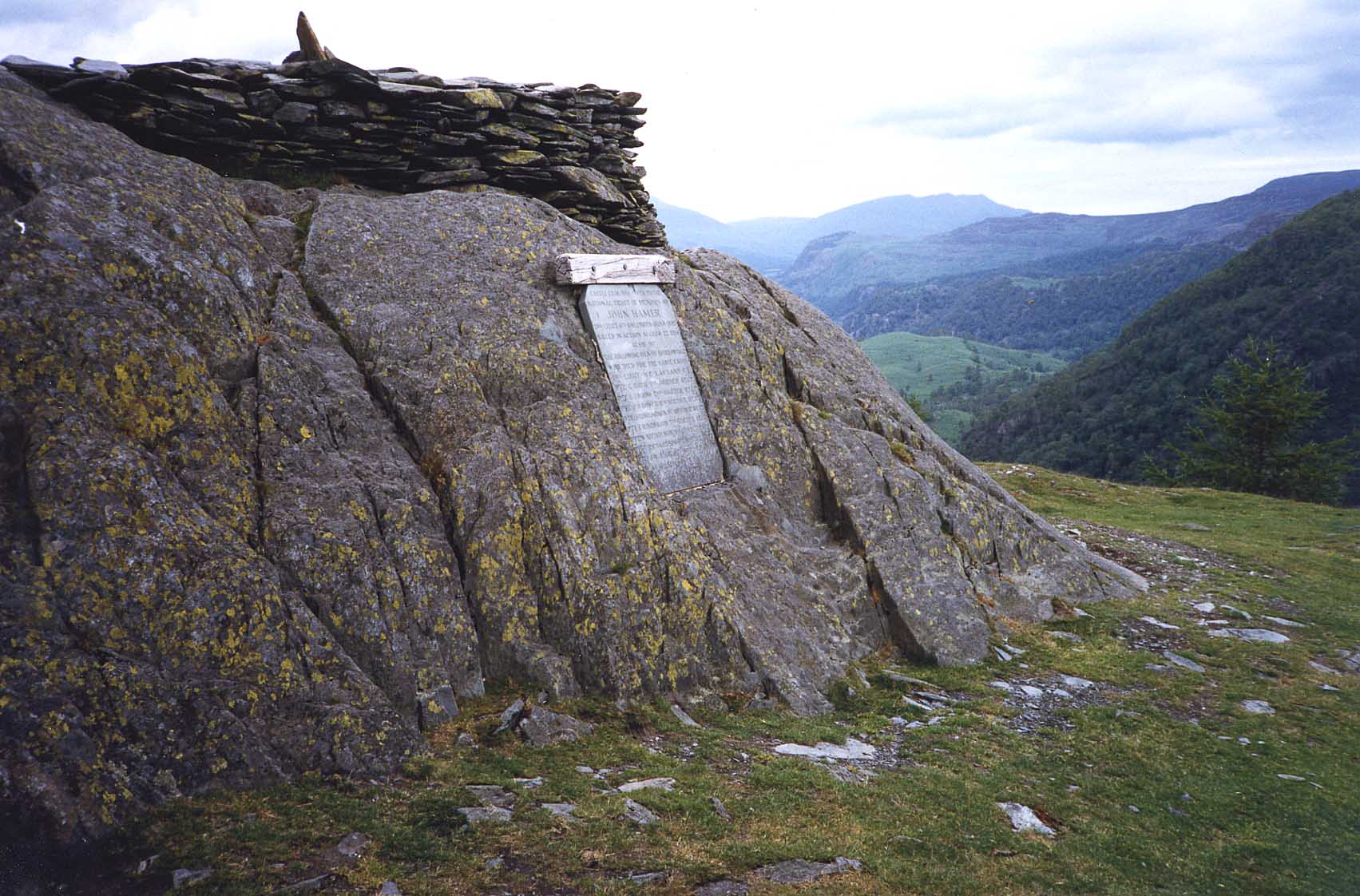
Castle Crag summit with circular stone cairn (no longer present, as of 2024) and war memorial.

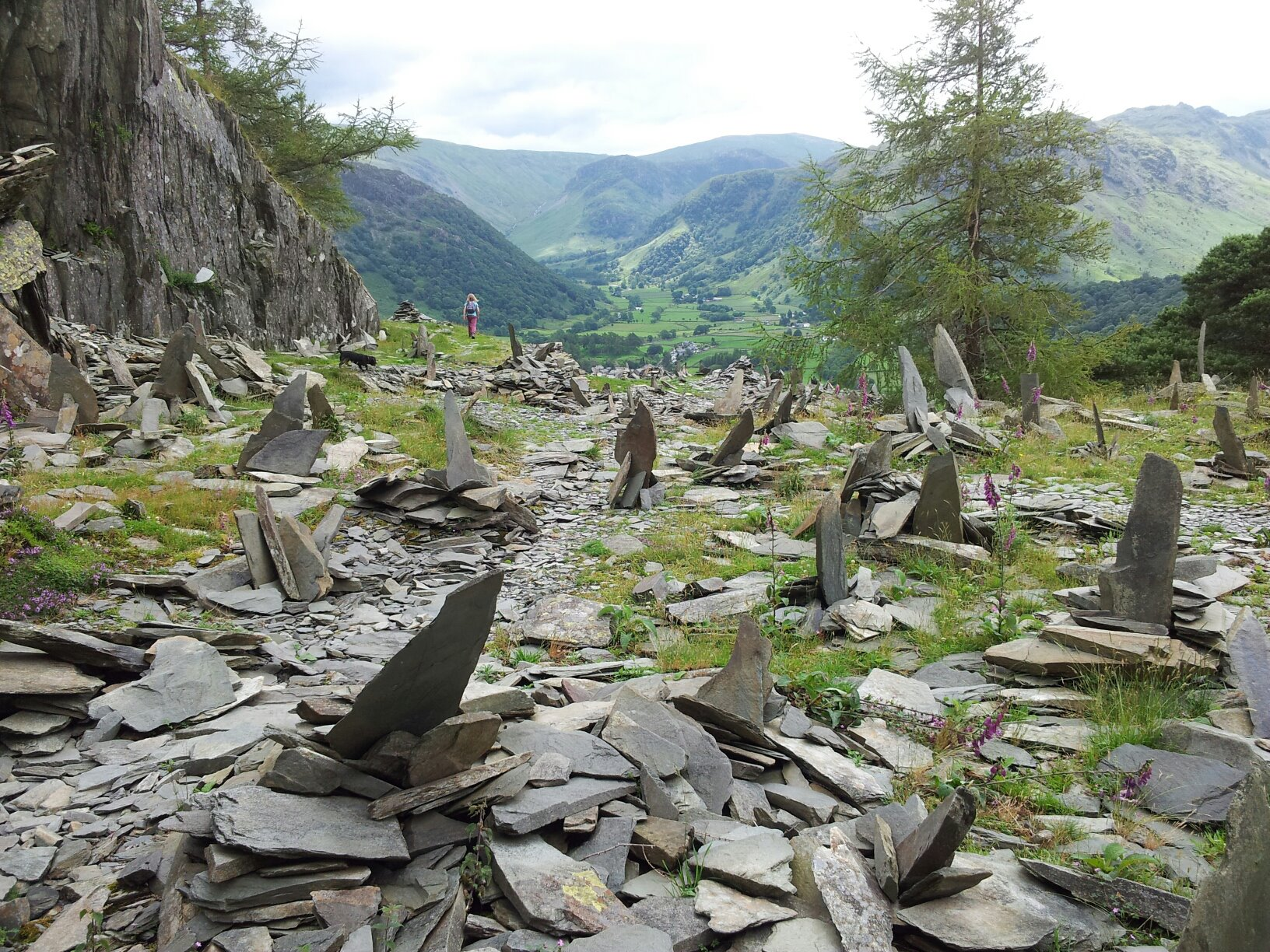
Castle Crag Quarry, nicknamed The Graveyard

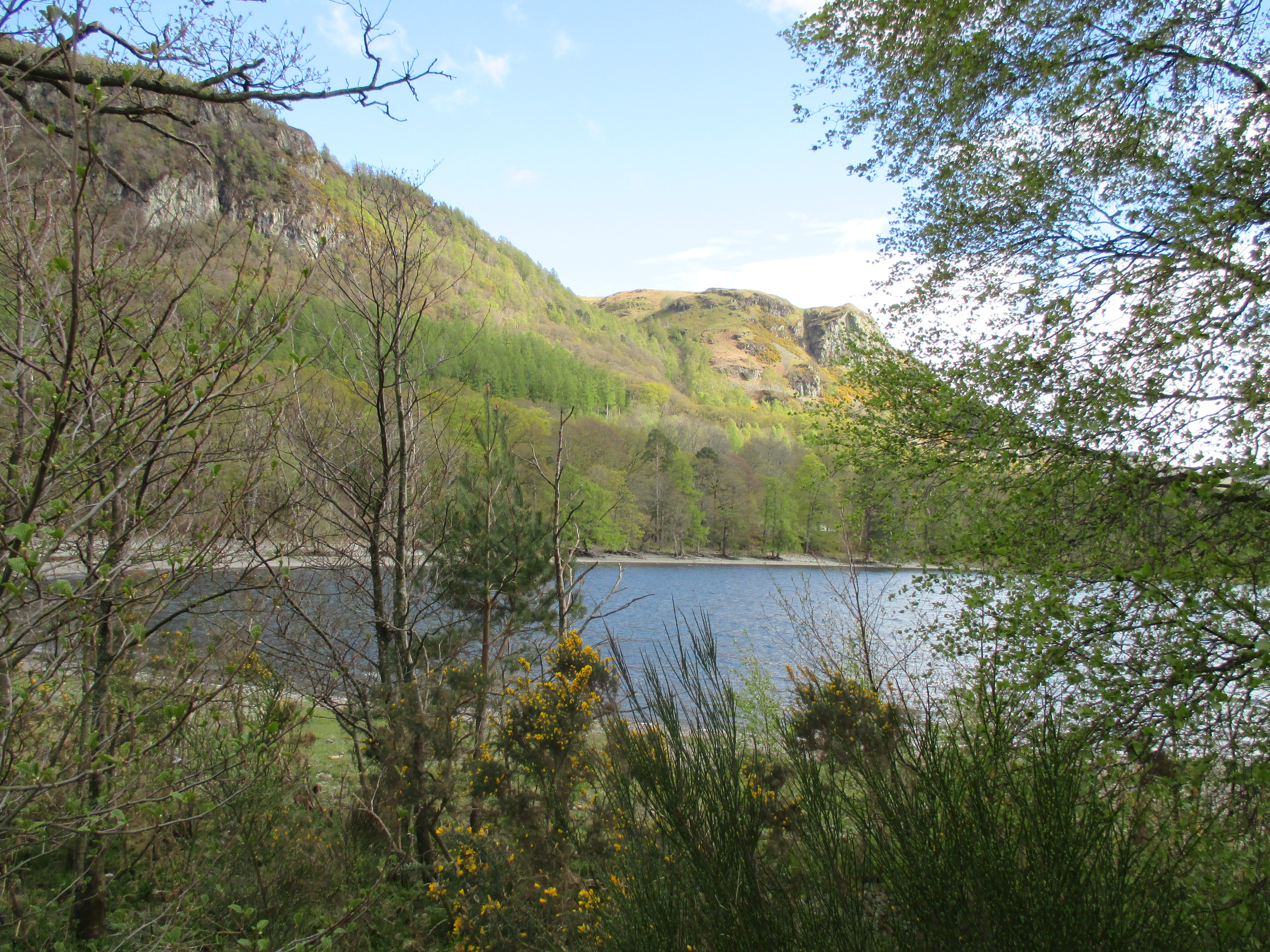
A view of Falcon Crag, with the eastern shore of Calfclose Bay, Derwent Water at its foot.
