= Listed buildings in Borrowdale =

Borrowdale is a civil parish in the Cumberland district in Cumbria, England. It contains 39 listed buildings that are recorded in the National Heritage List for England. All the listed buildings are designated at Grade II, the lowest of the three grades, which is applied to "buildings of national importance and special interest". The parish is in the Lake District National Park, and it includes the settlements of Rosthwaite, Stonethwaite, Seathwaite, Seatoller, Grange, and Watendlath. Parts of the parish are agricultural, and much of it consists of fells and mountains. All the listed buildings are in the settlements and the valleys. A high proportion of them are, or originated as, houses, cottages, farmhouses or farm buildings. The other listed buildings are seven bridges, a former corn mill, a war memorial, and two telephone kiosks.

== Buildings ==
Name and location	Photograph	Date	Notes
The Yew Tree Restaurant; 54.51365°N 3.16810°W	—	1628	Originally a cottage, later converted into a restaurant, it is rendered and has a green slate roof. It has two storeys and four bays. The original doorway has a slate-slab gabled porch, and the present doorway is to the right with a dated panel above. In the upper floor are horizontal sliding sash windows, and the windows in the lower floor are casements and there is a fire window.
Ashness Farmhouse and barn 54.56361°N 3.12785°W	—	Mid 17th century	The farmhouse and barn are rendered on large plinth stones and they have a green slate roof. The house has two storeys and four bays, with a 19th-century rear extension. On the front is a 17th-century door in a 17th-century porch with side seats, horizontal sliding sash windows, and a fire window. The barn to the right has doorways, windows, and ventilation slits. At the rear are slate steps leading to a loft door. Inside the house is an inglenook and a bressumer.
Derwent Farmhouse; 54.54647°N 3.15655°W	—	Mid 17th century	A rendered farmhouse with a green slate roof, in two storeys and three bays. It has a slate-slab gabled porch, casement windows, and a fire window. Inside there is an inglenook and a bressumer.
Fellside Cottage; 54.51327°N 3.14058°W	—	17th century	The cottage is in rendered slate rubble with a green slate roof. It has two storeys and two bays, a 20th-century door in a plain surround, and casement windows with plain reveals.
Grange Farm House and barn 54.54669°N 3.15602°W	—	Mid 17th century	Formerly a farmhouse with an attached barn, it is in rubble with a green slate roof. The house has two storeys and four bays, with a slate-slab porch and sash windows, some of which are horizontal sliding sashes. The former barn contains garage doors and a loft door. Inside the house is an inglenook and a bressumer.
Longthwaite Farmhouse and barn 54.51916°N 3.15178°W		Mid 17th century	The farmhouse and barn have a green slate roof. The house is rendered on a boulder plinth, and has two storeys and three bays. It has a 17th-century gabled porch containing side seats, one sash window, all the other windows being casements. The barn to the left is in slate and cobble rubble, and it contains doorways and a mullioned window.
Manor House and former stables 54.54651°N 3.15616°W	—	Mid 17th century	The building was extended in the 18th and 19th centuries, and was altered in the 1920s. It is roughcast with green slate roofs. The house has two storeys and four bays, with the former stable incorporated into the house. There is also a lower two-bay extension to the rear. On the front is a gabled stone porch, a 20th-century verandah, oriel windows, casement windows, and two gabled dormer windows. In the extension is a bay window and sash windows.
Seathwaite Cottage; 54.49889°N 3.18219°W	—	Mid 17th century	A roughcast cottage with a green slate roof, in two storeys and three bays. The door dates from the 20th century. The windows are casements, those in the upper floor probably in their original reveals, those below having been enlarged.
Seathwaite Farm Cottage; 54.49901°N 3.18211°W	—	Mid 17th century	The cottage is roughcast with a green slate roof, in two storeys and with two bays. It has a plank door with a plain surround, and sash windows.
Steps End Farmhouse; 54.53755°N 3.12080°W	—	Mid 17th century	The farmhouse is in slate rubble, with a slate string course and a green slate roof. It has two storeys and three bays. On the front is a 17th-century door in a 17th-century gabled porch with side seats. The windows are casements in plain reveals.
Seathwaite Farmhouse and barn 54.49906°N 3.18206°W	—	1663	The farmhouse and attached barn have a green slate roof. The house is roughcast and has a 20th-century door with a plain surround. The windows in the upper floor are sashes, and in the ground floor they are horizontal sliding sashes. The barn is dated 1851, it is in slate rubble, and has a plank door and a casement window.
Stonethwaite Farmhouse; 54.51329°N 3.14015°W	—	Mid or late 17th century	The farmhouse is in rendered rubble with a green slate roof. There are two storeys and five bays, sash windows in plain reveals, and a 20th-century porch. Inside there is an inglenook and a bressumer.
Caffle House; 54.53693°N 3.12085°W	—	Late 17th century	Originally a farmhouse, later used for other purposes, it is in slate rubble with a green slate roof. The building has two storeys and five bays. There is a 20th-century door with a plain surround, and 20th-century windows in plain reveals, all under wooden lintels. The left bay is open, and at the rear are three 19th-century extensions. Inside the building is an inglenook.
Croft Cottage and Farmhouse; 54.51361°N 3.14126°W	—	Late 17th century	The cottage and farmhouse are rendered with a green slate roof, and are in two storeys. The cottage has two bays and the farmhouse has three. The doors and porches date from the 20th century, and the windows are sashes.
Oak Cottage and barn 54.52272°N 3.14901°W	—	Late 17th century	The cottage and barn have a green slate roof. The cottage is roughcast on a cobble plinth, and has two storeys and three bays. Its 20th-century door has a plain surround, there is a fire window, and the other windows are sashes. The barn to the left is in slate rubble and split boulders. It contains a plank door under a mullioned opening, and in its extension are ventilation slits.
Yew Tree Farmhouse, Rosthwaite; 54.52291°N 3.14926°W		Late 17th century	The farmhouse is in slate rubble with a roughcast extension under a green slate roof. There are two storeys, a main part of three bays, a 19th-century one-bay extension to the left, and a two-bay extension to the rear, giving the building a T-shaped plan. There is a recessed porch with a 20th-century door, most of the windows are casements, and there is a small fire window.
Yew Tree Farmhouse, Stonethwaite; 54.51343°N 3.14051°W		Late 17th century	The farmhouse is in slate rubble with a green slate roof, it is in two storeys and has three bays. On the front is a 17th-century porch with side seats, and the windows are casements.
Chapel House Farmhouse and Cottage; 54.51534°N 3.14814°W	—	Late 17th or early 18th century	The farmhouse and attached cottage are rendered and have a green slate roof. Both the house and the cottage have two storeys and three bays, with a single-bay extension to the right. The doors date from the 20th century; the windows in the extension are casements, and the other windows are sashes.
Fold End Farmhouse and barns 54.53650°N 3.12076°W	—	Late 17th or early 18th century	The building is in slate rubble with quoins and green slate roofs. The house is roughcast, in two storeys and three bays, with a two-bay extension to the rear. The door and windows date from the 20th century and have plain reveals, and there is a fire window. The barn is to the left and has an L-shaped plan. It contains doors, a loft doorway, and a cart entrance. Inside the house is a semicircular stone staircase.
High Lodore Farmhouse and barn 54.55476°N 3.14275°W	—	Late 17th or early 18th century	The farmhouse and attached barn are in slate rubble with a green slate roof. The farmhouse has two storeys and four bays with a one-bay extension to the left. There is a slate-slab gabled porch, and in the main part of the house the windows are sashes. In the extension there is a casement window in the upper storey, and a sash window below. The barn has plank doors, a casement window, and ventilation slits.
Coombe Gill Mill; 54.51065°N 3.15496°W		Early 18th century	A former water-powered corn mill with a drying kiln and store, it is in stone with quoins and slate roofs. The mill has a single storey and a rectangular plan, and at the west end is a wheel pit with a six-spoke waterwheel. The drying kiln is to the north and has an attached lean-to.
Greenup Corner; 54.51385°N 3.14070°W	—	Early 18th century	A cottage in split cobble and slate rubble, with large quoins and a green slate roof. There are two storeys and four bays, a stone porch, and sash windows in plain reveals with slate lintels.
Howe Cottages; 54.52245°N 3.14951°W	—	Early 18th century	A pair of cottages in slate rubble, partly rendered, with a green slate roof. Both cottages have two storeys, the left cottage has four bays, and the right cottage has three. The doorways have plain surrounds, and the sash windows are in plain reveals.
The Cottage, Stonethwaite; 54.51312°N 3.14005°W	—	Early 18th century	The cottage and former stable are in slate rubble with a green slate roof. There are two storeys and two bays, with the former stable at a lower level to the left. The door and wooden porch date from the 20th century. The windows are a mixture of sashes and casements, and there is one fire window.
Stockley Bridge; 54.48769°N 3.18302°W		Early to mid 18th century	Originally a packhorse bridge, it carries a footpath over Grains Gill. The bridge is in slate rubble, and consists of a narrow single segmental arch with a hump back. It has split-slate voussoirs and a low parapet.
Ashness Bridge; 54.56720°N 3.13009°W		18th century	Originally a packhorse bridge, a parapet was added in the 19th century, and it was widened in the 20th century. The bridge is in slate rubble, and consists of a narrow single segmental arch with a hump back. It has voussoirs, a solid parapet, and rubble coping.
Long Corner Cottage; 54.54654°N 3.15669°W	—	Mid 18th century	A house in slate rubble with a green slate roof. It has two storeys and four bays, and has 20th-century doors in plain surrounds, The windows are casements in plain reveals.
Nook Cottage, Farmhouse and barn 54.52271°N 3.14971°W	—	Mid 18th century	The cottage, farmhouse and barn are under one green slate roof. The cottage and farmhouse have two storeys and contain sash windows. The cottage has two bays, and the farmhouse has three; over the door of the farmhouse is a fanlight. In the barn are casement windows and plank doors under stone lintels, a loft door, and ventilation slits.
Coombe Gill Packhorse Bridge; 54.51212°N 3.15454°W		18th century or earlier	The packhorse bridge is in slate rubble, and consists of a single arch with a hump back. It has voussoirs, and boulder stone parapets with flat coping stones.
Watendlath Packhorse Bridge; 54.53707°N 3.12142°W		18th century	A packhorse bridge in slate rubble, it consists of a narrow single segmental arch with a hump back. The bridge has split-slate voussoirs and a low parapet.
Folly Bridge; 54.51456°N 3.15911°W		1781	A footbridge over the River Derwent in slate rubble. It consists of a narrow single segmental arch with a hump back, and has slate voussoirs and a solid parapet with slab coping. On the east face is an inscribed stone.
Barrow House; 54.57001°N 3.13300°W		1787–96	A country house, later extended and used for different purposes. It is stuccoed on a chamfered plinth, with a string course, an eaves cornice, quoins, and a green slate roof. There are two storeys with attics. On the front are three two-storey canted bay windows, and there are two dormers.
Grange Bridge; 54.54688°N 3.15477°W		Early 19th century	The bridge has two spans and carries a road over two arms of the River Derwent. It is in slate rubble, and each arch has a humped back, slate voussoirs, and a solid parapet with rubble coping.
Grange Bridge Cottage; 54.54689°N 3.15564°W	—	Early 19th century	A cottage in slate rubble with quoins and a green slate roof. There are two storeys and four bays, a 20th-century door, and casement windows in plain reveals.
Rosthwaite Bridge; 54.52452°N 3.14656°W		Early 19th century	The bridge carries Hazel Bank Drive over Stonethwaite Beck. It is in green slate rubble, and consists of a narrow single segmental arch with a hump back. The bridge has voussoirs, a solid parapet, and slate-slab coping.
Barn, Yew Tree Farm; 54.51349°N 3.14083°W	—	Early 19th century	The barn is in It has a central entrance with a segmental head, and to the sides are plank doors with plain surrounds and stone lintels. In the eaves are ventilation slits.
Grange War Memorial; 54.54724°N 3.15697°W		1922	The war memorial is in the churchyard of Holy Trinity Church, Grange, and stands against the south wall of the church. It is in Honister slate, and consists of a wheel-head cross on a square plinth and a single-stepped base. The front and sides of the cross-head and shaft are intricately carved, including animals, vines, a laurel wreath, and strapwork. On the shaft is an inscription and the names of those lost in the First World War, and in front of the plinth is a tablet with an inscription and the names of those lost in the Second World War.
Telephone kiosk, Seatoller; 54.51352°N 3.16765°W		1935	A K6 type telephone kiosk, designed by Giles Gilbert Scott. Constructed in cast iron with a square plan and a dome, it has three unperforated crowns in the top panels.
Telephone kiosk, Stonethwaite; 54.51374°N 3.14059°W	—	1935	A K6 type telephone kiosk, designed by Giles Gilbert Scott. Constructed in cast iron with a square plan and a dome, it has three unperforated crowns in the top panels.
