= Rosthwaite Fell =

Mountain in Cumbria, England

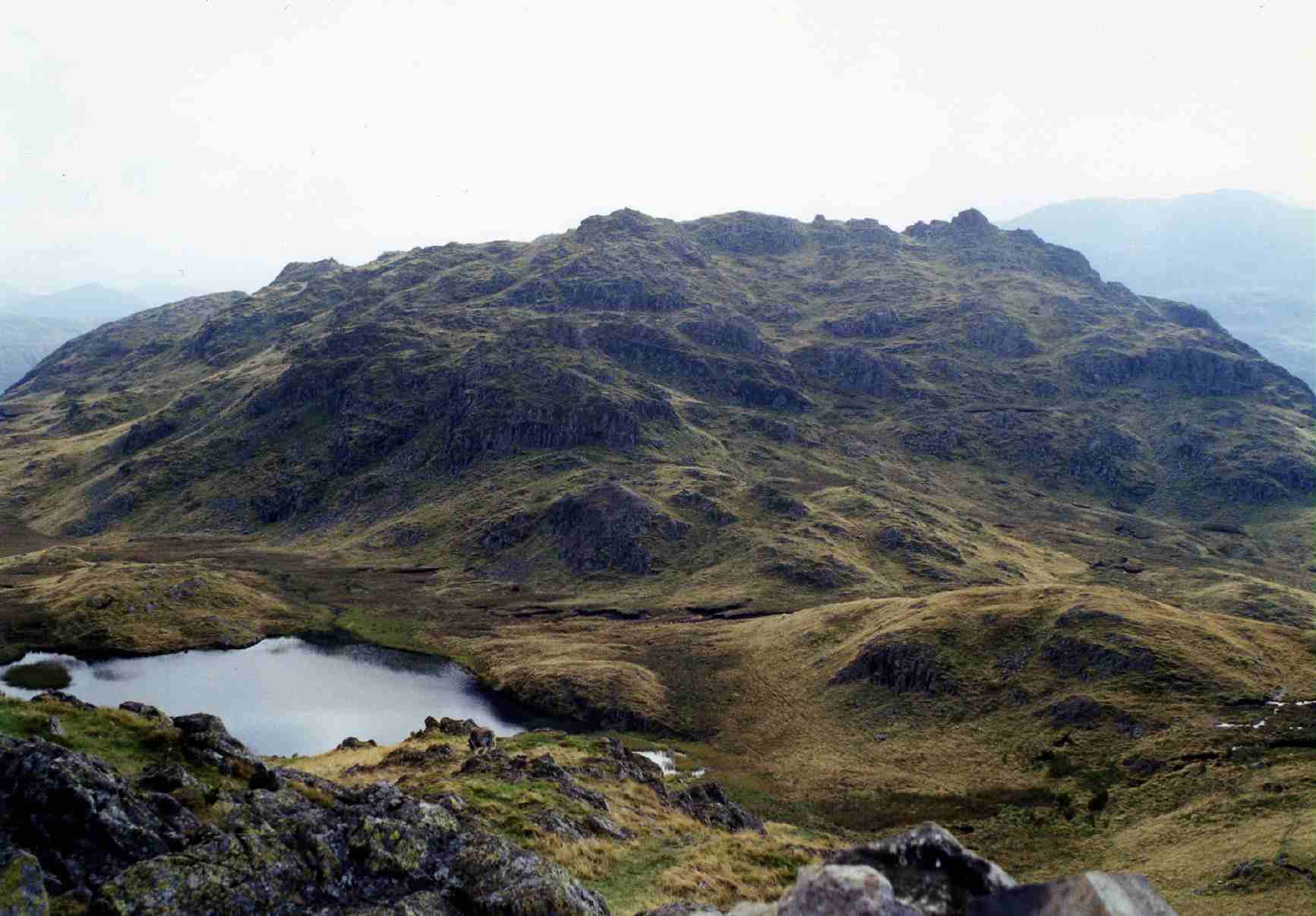
- Rosthwaite Cam from Bessyboot with Tarn at Leaves in between

Highest point
- Elevation: 612 m (2,008 ft)
- Prominence: c. 15 m (50 ft)
- Parent peak: Dovenest Top
- Listing: Wainwright (Bessyboot)
- Coordinates: 54°29′46″N 3°09′06″W

Geography
- Location within the Lake District Location within the former Allerdale Borough
- Location: Cumbria, England
- Parent range: Lake District, Southern Fells
- OS grid: NY255118
- Topo map: OS Landrangers 89,90, Explorer OL4

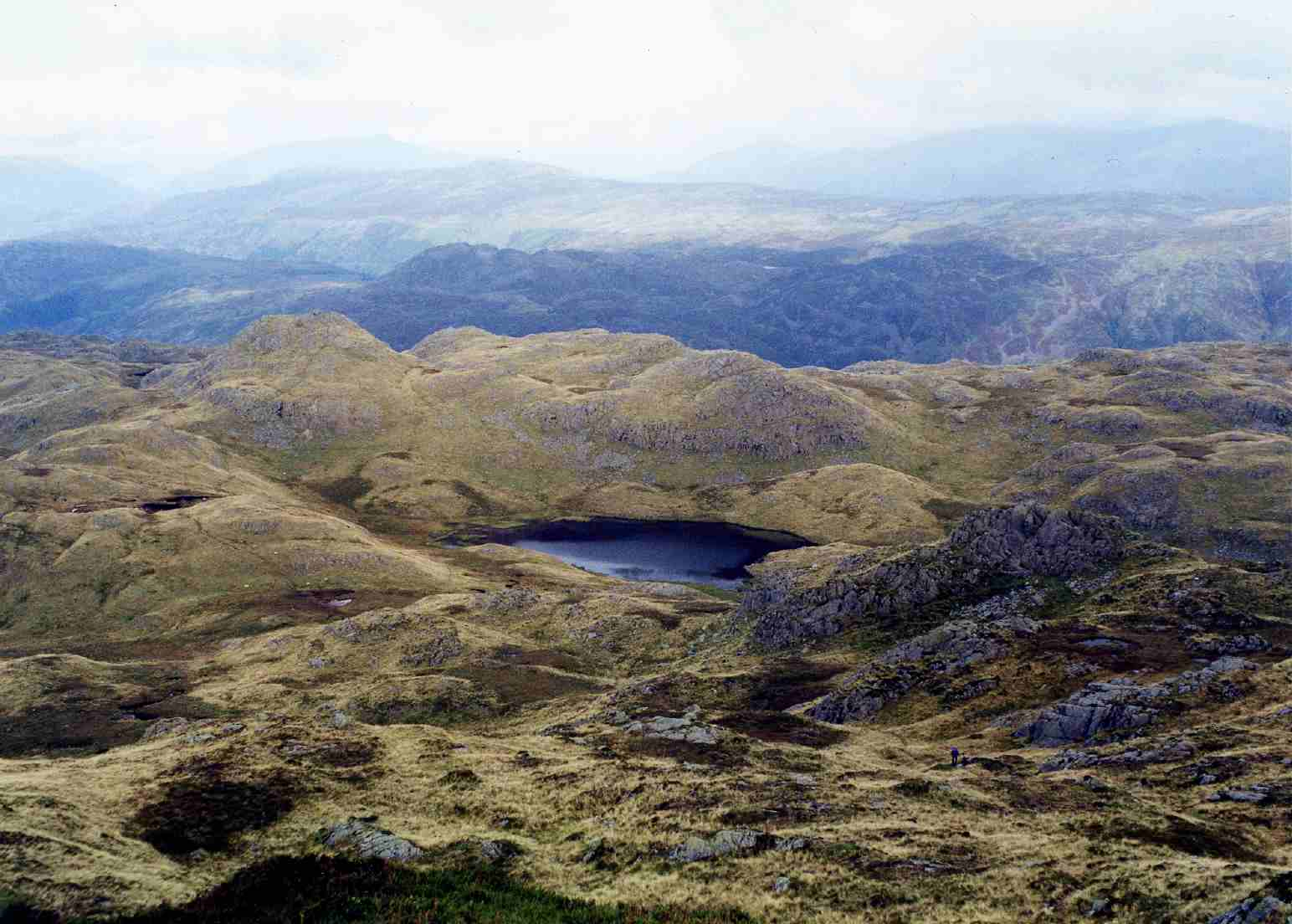
Bessyboot above Tarn at Leaves from Rosthwaite Cam. This is the Wainwright summit of the fell.

Rosthwaite Fell is a fell in the English Lake District. It is situated some 12 kilometres (7 1/2 miles) due south of Keswick and 2 kilometres (1 1/4 miles) south of the village of Rosthwaite in Borrowdale.

Rosthwaite Fell also has loose connections to the Scafell group of fells. The fells name derives from the Old Norse language and means “The peak above the clearing with a heap of stones” with “hreysi” meaning a heap of stones and “thveit” meaning a clearing.

== Topography ==
Rosthwaite Fell reaches a height of 612 m (2,008 ft) at its highest point, which is commonly known as Rosthwaite Cam. It also has a subsidiary top, Bessyboot (550 m, 1,804 ft), which lies 800 metres (870 yards) north of the main summit. Alfred Wainwright took Bessyboot as the summit of the fell for his Pictorial Guide to the Lakeland Fells. Dovenest Crag, which lies 500 metres (550 yards) south west of the summit, is generally considered to be a part of Glaramara and is covered in that article.

The fell's boundaries are clearly defined to the north, west and east by valleys and streams. The western side falls to Borrowdale and the infant River Derwent, the eastern flank descends to the Langstrath valley and its beck while the northern slopes go down to the Stonethwaite valley. To the south, Rosthwaite Fell is linked to the higher and better known fell of Glaramara by a marshy and undulating ridge which goes over several subsidiary tops on the way.

Rosthwaite Fell features steep, craggy terrain on the three sides facing the surrounding valleys, with no straightforward ascent route. The area contains multiple alternative climbing paths, this specific fell generally sees low visitor traffic and remains relatively isolated.

== Geology ==
Because of its unique geology, Rosthwaite Fell was declared a Site of Special Scientific Interest in 1985 over an area of 230 hectares (570 acres). With the English Nature web site saying:

"The extensive crags and rock outcrops within this site provide outstanding exposures of a thick succession of volcanic rock-layers representing a large proportion of the important episode of volcanic activity which generated the Borrowdale Volcanic Group during the middle Ordovician Period of geological history, about 460 million years ago. A wide variety of different rocktypes are present and well exposed within the site. This is an important site as a reference section for detailed geological study and is of historical interest as an area where certain volcanic rock-types were first recognised."

== Ascents ==
Rosthwaite Fell can be climbed from Stonethwaite or from the Borrowdale road between Seatoller and Rosthwaite. The latter route goes up Combe Gill for a kilometre before striking steeply up the gill's eastern flank to gain the top of the fell. The Stonethwaite route uses Stanger Gill as a guide up to a height of almost 500 metres (1,600 feet) from where it is a simple walk to the summit of Bessyboot. A mild scramble also allows the north ridge to be ascended starting behind Chapel Farm and keeping west of the locally named Papelay Crag.

== Summits ==
The fell's two main summits, Rosthwaite Cam and Bessyboot, are divided by a depression with a height of around 500 metres (1,600 ft) which contains the charmingly named Tarn at Leaves, a small mountain lake with a length of approximately 100 metres (330 ft). The summit rocks of Rosthwaite Cam require some mild scrambling to reach the highest point.
