= Barrow House, Cumbria =

Late eighteenth-century mansion in the Lake District, England

Barrow House
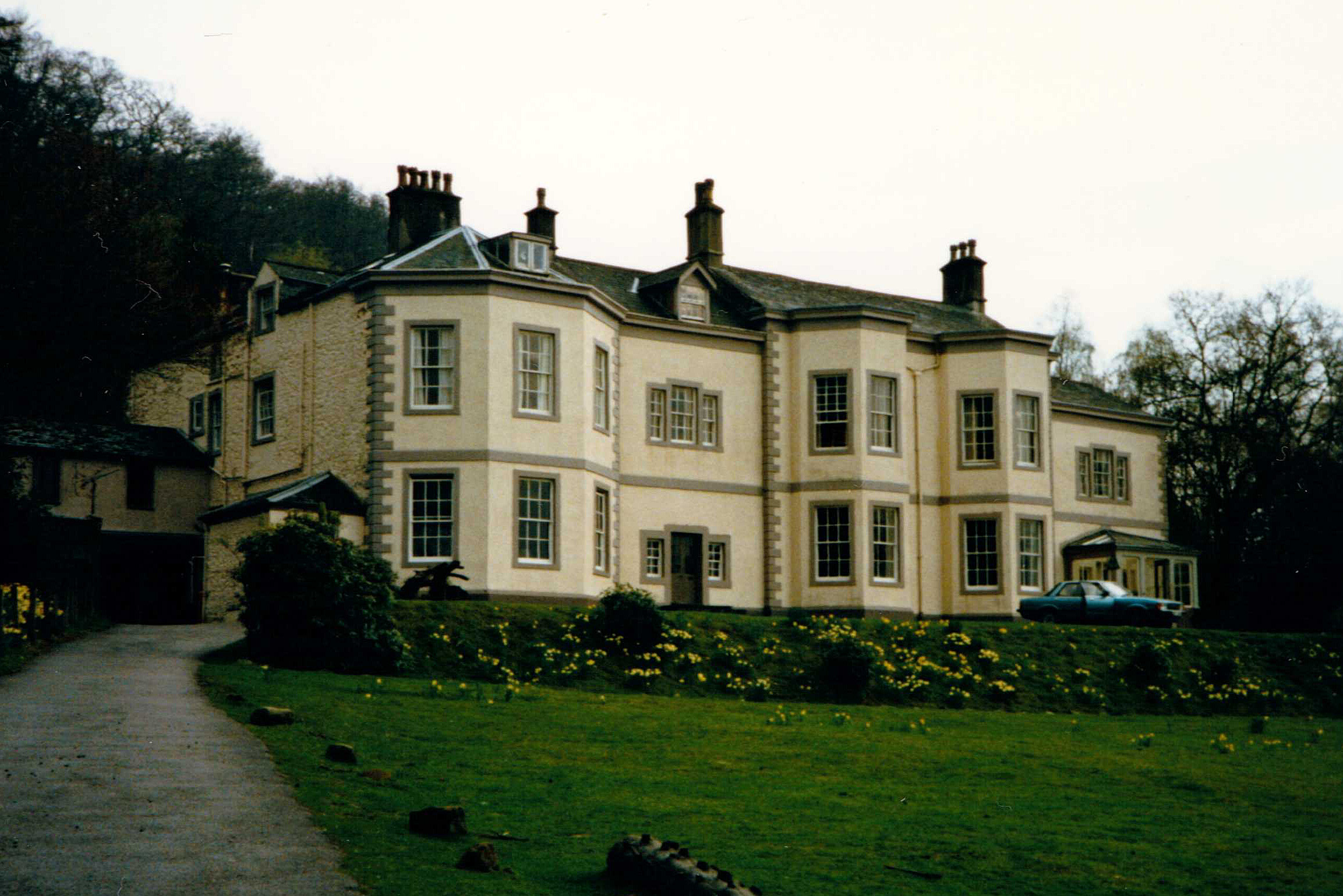

- Location within Cumbria
- 54°34′11.95″N 3°7′58.64″W
- Location: Cumbria, England
- OS grid reference: NY2685520013

Site notes
- Architect: Joseph Pocklington
- Owner: Derwentwater Youth Hostel Ltd

Listed Building – Grade II
- Official name: Register of Historic Parks and Gardens
- Type: Grade II

Barrow House is a late 18th-century mansion situated on the eastern shore of Derwentwater in Borrowdale within the Lake District National Park, in the county of Cumbria, England. The house is a Grade II listed building which since the time of its construction has had various uses: it was originally a private dwelling and has since served as a hotel, a youth hostel run by the YHA, and was then an independent hostel until March 2024.

== History ==
Construction work began on Barrow House in 1787, the house being built by Joseph Pocklington (1736–1817). Pocklington was the son of an affluent Nottinghamshire banker and was viewed locally as a wealthy eccentric. He had inherited a large fortune at the age of 26 which allowed him to lead a life of luxury. In 1778 he purchased Derwent Island House on Derwent Isle, the most northerly of the islands on Derwentwater. Pocklington constructed various buildings on Derwent Isle which upset many of the local population, with William Wordsworth describing them as “mere puerilities”. In 1798 he purchased the Bowder Stone and built a cottage nearby for a guide, erected a ladder and cleared away the stones from around it, earning criticism from the poet Robert Southey. In 1796 Pocklington sold Derwent Island House to General William Peachy and moved to the newly completed Barrow House.

Barrow House cost £1,655 to build and was initially called Barrow Cascade House because Pocklington had created a 108 foot high waterfall behind the house (to compete with the nearby Lodore Falls) by employing workmen to divert and channel a stream. The cascade was generally well received, although Samuel Taylor Coleridge who had little positive to say about Pocklington, called it “the commonplace cascade at King Pocky’s”. Shortly after completion a folly was built between the rear of the house and the cascade, this took the form of a small hermitage. Pocklington hoped that this would be a tourist attraction and he offered payment for a local to play the part of the hermit, an offer that was not taken up, and the folly was never occupied. The early part of the 19th century saw alterations to the house with side extensions being added and the windows altered.

Pocklington died in 1817; the house remained a private dwelling until the early 1900s when it was converted into a hotel. It became a youth hostel in 1931 and reverted to being a hotel in 1950. The Youth Hostels Association purchased the building in 1961 and it remained a YHA hostel until 2011 when it was announced that the house would be sold as part of the YHA's financial reorganisation. The house was advertised for sale at a price of £1,250,000 in late 2011 and was described as having “spacious accommodation totalling 947 square metres (10,190 square feet) set in 6 hectares (14.8 acres) of grounds including woodlands, grassland and a waterfall.” In November 2011 Barrow House was purchased by local businessman John Snyder who had set up a charitable organisation (Derwentwater Youth Hostel Ltd.) to keep the house running as an independent hostel with the YHA agreeing to the proposal that it should retain the name of Derwentwater Youth Hostel. The hostel changed its name to Derwentwater Independent Hostel in November 2013.

=== The hostel today ===
As from November 2011 the hostel was no longer part of the YHA organisation: it was managed by Tim Butcher as a non-profit-making charitable trust . The hostel had 88 beds in 11 bedrooms and catered for families, groups and individuals; it had its own small hydroelectricity plant. The independent hostel closed permanently on 3 March 2024 under the threat of expensive refurbishment works and a possible sale the next year.

== Architecture ==
The house has white painted stucco walls with a hipped graduated green slate roof with two dormer windows. The front of the house is characterised by three substantial two storey bay windows.

== See also ==
- Listed buildings in Borrowdale
