= Great Wood =

Protected area in Cumbria, England

- Site of Special Scientific Interest
- Location within Cumbria
- Location of Great Wood.
- Area of search: Cumbria
- Grid reference: NY275213
- Coordinates: 54.5825°N 3.1225°W
- Area: 107.0 acres (0.43 km^{2}; 0.17 sq mi)
- Notification date: 1983

Great Wood is a Site of Special Scientific Interest (SSSI) within the Lake District National Park in Cumbria, England. This protected area is located 2km south of Keswick and borders the eastern shore of Derwent Water. This woodland is internationally important because of the diversity of lichens and bryophytes found here.

This protected area includes the cliff called Walla Crag. Part of this protected area is also included within Borrowdale Rainforest National Nature Reserve.

== Biology ==
The soils on which the Great Wood is situated vary from being acidic to being basic. On more acid soils, the dominant tree is sessile oak. On more base-rich soils, the dominant trees are ash or wych elm. Touch-me-not balsam has been recorded in this protected area and orpine has been recorded from cliff habitat here.

At least one hundred lichen species have been recorded in Great Wood which makes it the third richest known locality for lichens in northern England. The lichen species Arthopyrenia cinereo-pruinosa has been recorded from this protected area.

== Geology ==
The Great Wood is situated on rocks from the Borrowdale Volcanic Series.

== Land ownership ==
All of the land within Great Wood SSSI is owned by the National Trust.
