= B5289 road =

Road in the Lake District, England

B5289

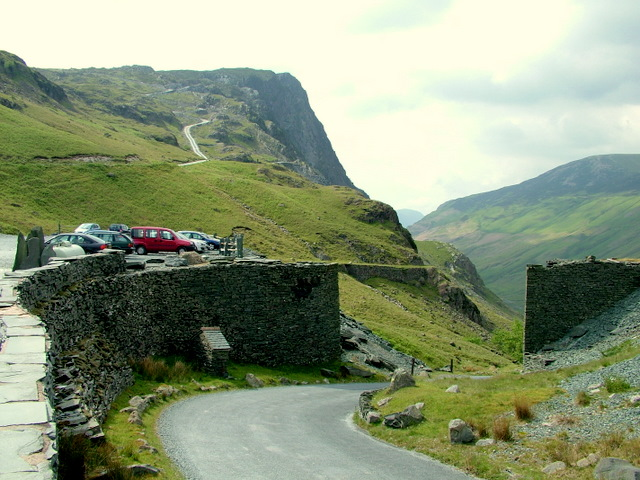
- At the summit of Honister Pass.

Route information
- Length: 20.0 mi (32.2 km)

Major junctions
- east end: 54.6021°N 3.1404°W
- west end: 54.6293°N 3.3139°W

Location
- Country: United Kingdom

Road network
- Roads in the United Kingdom; Motorways; A and B road zones

The B5289 is a road in the Lake District, England. It lies in the county of Cumbria, and is an important traffic artery in the Lake District.

== Route ==
The road starts in Keswick and passes alongside Derwent Water. At the southern end of the lake it enters Borrowdale, passing the settlements of Grange, Rosthwaite and Seatoller. This stretch of road is notable for its views of the surrounding fells, including Catbells and Glaramara.

At Seatoller, the road starts its climb up to Honister Pass. This part of the route has many zig-zags, with gradients of 1 in 4 (25%) as it struggles up the 200 metres (600 feet) to the top. The top of the pass is an upland wilderness, with barren slopes and many erratic boulders, that is often covered in snow in the winter.

Coming down the other side the road passes the settlement of Gatesgarth and runs alongside the lake of Buttermere before reaching the village of Buttermere. It then runs alongside Crummock Water and through the valley of the River Cocker, passing the fells of Robinson and Grasmoor. It ends at the B5292 in High Lorton.

The road is also very popular with cyclists due to its scenic backdrop with many hills and mountains. Along the road, sheep are also a common sight. During the summer, the road is usually very busy with tourists.

== See also ==
- B roads in Zone 5 of the Great Britain numbering scheme
