= Glaramara =

Mountain in the English Lake District, Cumbria, England

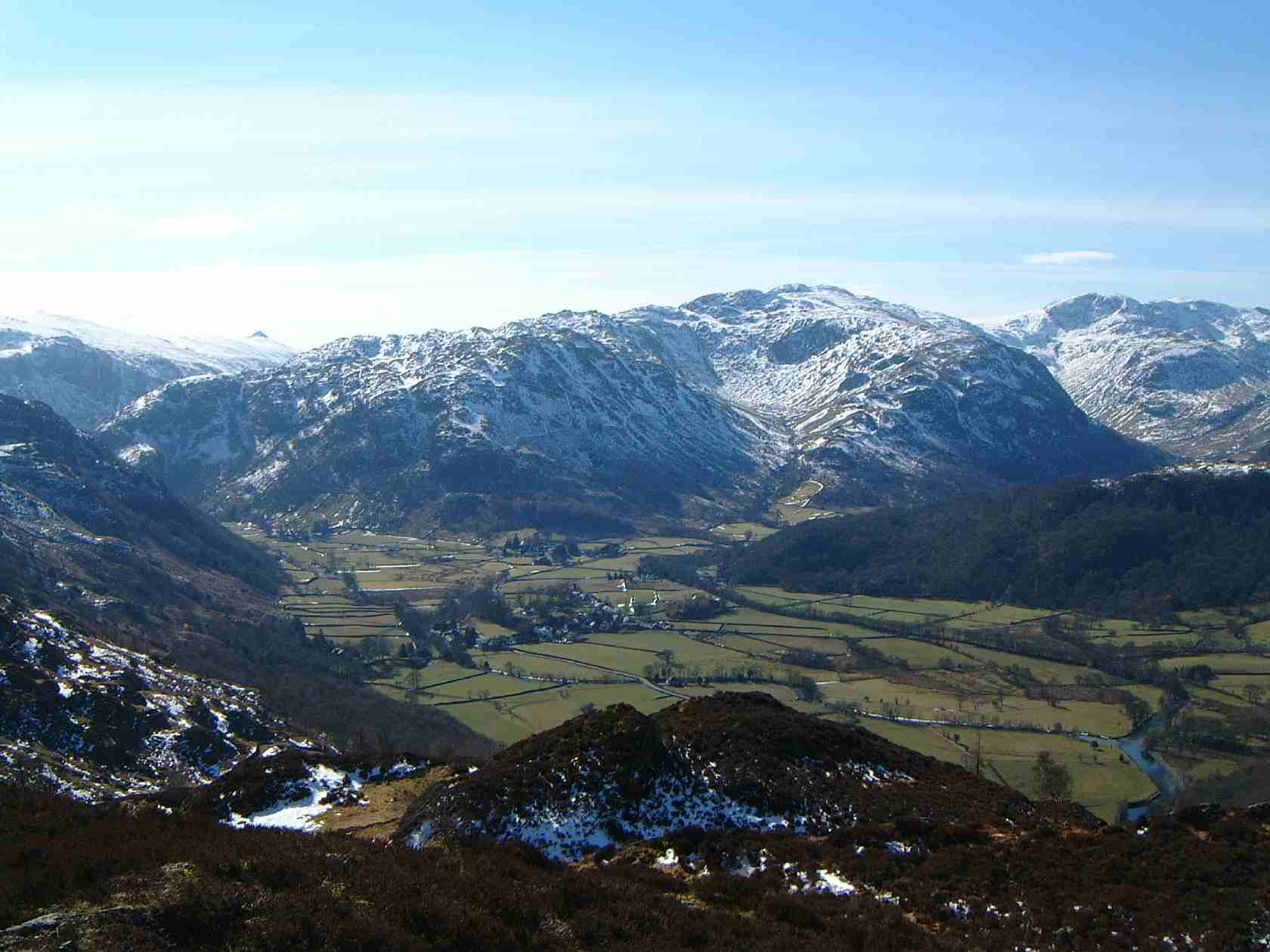
- Glaramara with the hanging valley of Combe Gill (centre right) seen from Grange Fell, 6 km to the north

Highest point
- Elevation: 783 m (2,569 ft)
- Prominence: 121 m (397 ft)
- Parent peak: Scafell Pike
- Listing: Hewitt, Nuttall, Wainwright
- Coordinates: 54°29′00″N 3°09′55″W

Naming
- English translation: "Hill with the mountain hut by a chasm"
- Language of name: Old Norse

Geography
- Location within the Lake District Location within the former Allerdale Borough
- Location: Cumbria, England
- Parent range: Lake District, Southern Fells
- OS grid: NY246104
- Topo map: OS Landrangers 89,90, Explorer OL4

Listed summits of Glaramara
| Name | Grid ref | Height | Status |
|---|---|---|---|
| Looking Steads | NY245101 | 775 m | Nuttall |
| Combe Head | NY249109 | 735 m | Nuttall |
| Red Beck Top (Lincomb Head) | NY242097 | 721 m | Hewitt, Nuttall |
| Combe Door Top | NY253108 | 676 m | Nuttall |
| Dovenest Top (Woofgill Pike) | NY255113 | 632 m | Hewitt, Nuttall |

Glaramara is a fell in the English Lake District in Cumbria. It is a substantial fell that is part of a long ridge that stretches for over six kilometres (3 3/4 miles) from Stonethwaite in Borrowdale up to the important mountain pass of Esk Hause. The summit of Glaramara at 783 metres (2,569 ft) is the central point of this ridge, which separates the valleys of Langstrath and Grains Gill. However, the ridge has two additional fells, numerous subsidiary tops and several small tarns making its traverse an appealing and challenging walk.

== Name ==
The fell’s unusual and pleasant-sounding name, previously only applied to the summit rocks, has now been accepted as the name for the whole fell. Like many fells of the district the name comes from a series of Old Norse words which in this case is translated as “Hill with the mountain hut by a chasm”.

== Topography ==
Glaramara’s most striking feature is Combe Gill on its northern slopes, a classic example of a hanging valley that was formed by glacial erosion during the last ice age. The gill is full of crags and according to Alfred Wainwright contains the only natural cave in the Lake District, called the Dove Nest Caves. A rock slip from Dove Nest Crags has partly covered the cave which has three entrances. On its east and west flanks the fell falls away steeply with rocky slopes and scree to the valleys. To the south the ridge continues from the summit of Glaramara for two kilometres (1 1/4 miles) over various tops (some of which are Hewitts or Nuttalls) with little loss of height to the adjoining fell of Allan Crags before descending to Esk Hause.

== Ascents ==
The direct ascent of the fell is usually started from the Borrowdale road midway between Rosthwaite and Seatoller. From here it is possible to ascend on either of the ridges to the east or west of Combe Gill, the east ridge being the best because it allows for the climbing of Rosthwaite Fell and its subsidiary summit of Dovenest Top (632 metres, 2073 ft). On this route two other tops of Glaramara, Combe Door Top (676 metres, 2218 ft) and Combe Head (735 metres, 2411 ft), are passed over. Both of these are Nuttalls. Combe Head gives fine views down into Combe Gill and from here it is short climb to the twin summits of Glaramara.A second, even more direct ascent can be made from the hamlet of Seathwaite to the west. This route is unusually steep and therefore lesser used.

== Summits ==
The view from the top of the fell is very good. Glaramara’s position in the centre of the Lake District and its relative isolation from other fells by deep valleys gives a good all-round panorama with the view north down Borrowdale towards Skiddaw being especially fine. Most walkers will continue south along the ridge towards the next main fell of Allen Crags taking in three more subsidiary tops on the way. The first of these is Looking Steads (775 metres, 2543 ft) which has Nuttall status, the second is Glaramara South Top / Red Beck Top / Lincomb Head (721 metres, 2365 ft) which is a Hewitt and also a Nuttall (called Red Beck Top on the list) and finally High House Tarn Top (684 metres, 2244 ft) which is also a Nuttall.

== Fell race ==
The fell is the scene of the annual Glaramara Fell Race which has taken place in April in the past but the 2006 event was switched to July. This is an eight-kilometre (five-mile) race from Glaramara Outdoor Centre near Seatoller to Glaramara’s summit with 640 metres (2,100 ft) of ascent. The winner of the race usually takes around 47 minutes to complete the course.
