= Grange in Borrowdale =

Village in Cumbria, England

Coordinates: 54.546903°N 3.156273°W

Grange
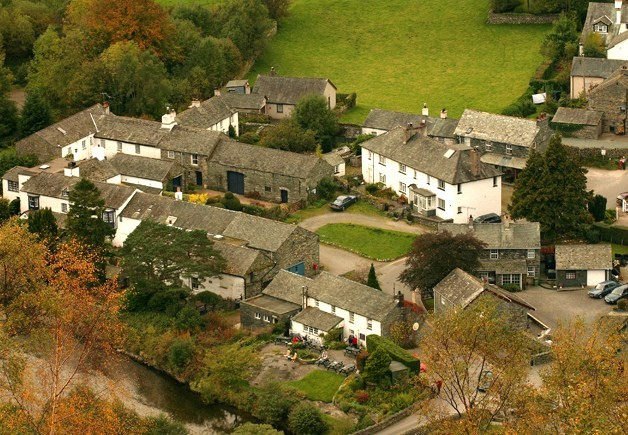
- Grange taken from Grange Crags

- Location in Allerdale, Cumbria Location within Cumbria
- OS grid reference: NY252174
- Civil parish: Borrowdale
- Unitary authority: Cumberland
- Ceremonial county: Cumbria
- Region: North West
- Country: England
- Sovereign state: United Kingdom
- Post town: KESWICK
- Postcode district: CA12
- Dialling code: 017687
- Police: Cumbria
- Fire: Cumbria
- Ambulance: North West
- UK Parliament: Penrith and Solway

Grange, often called Grange in Borrowdale, is a village in Borrowdale in the English Lake District. It lies just off the B5289 road to the south of Derwent Water and 4 miles (6.4 km) south of Keswick, in the county of Cumbria, historically part of Cumberland,

The village is overlooked by Grange Fell and Castle Crag, which flank either side of the narrow section of Borrowdale in which it sits. Its origins date back to medieval times, when the monks of Furness Abbey built a monastic grange on the site. The double-arched bridge that links the village to the B5289 across the River Derwent was built in 1675. Holy Trinity Church followed in 1861.

The novelist Hugh Walpole owned Brackenburn, a large house about 1 mile (1.6 km) to the north of Grange, and lived there from 1924 until his death in 1941.

== Governance ==
Grange in Borrowdale is within the Penrith and Solway UK Parliamentary constituency.

For Local Government purposes it is in the Cumberland unitary authority area.

Grange in Borrowdale has its own Parish Council; Borrowdale Parish Council.

== See also ==
- Listed buildings in Borrowdale
