= Stonethwaite =

Village in Cumbria, England

Coordinates: 54.50689°N 3.14435°W

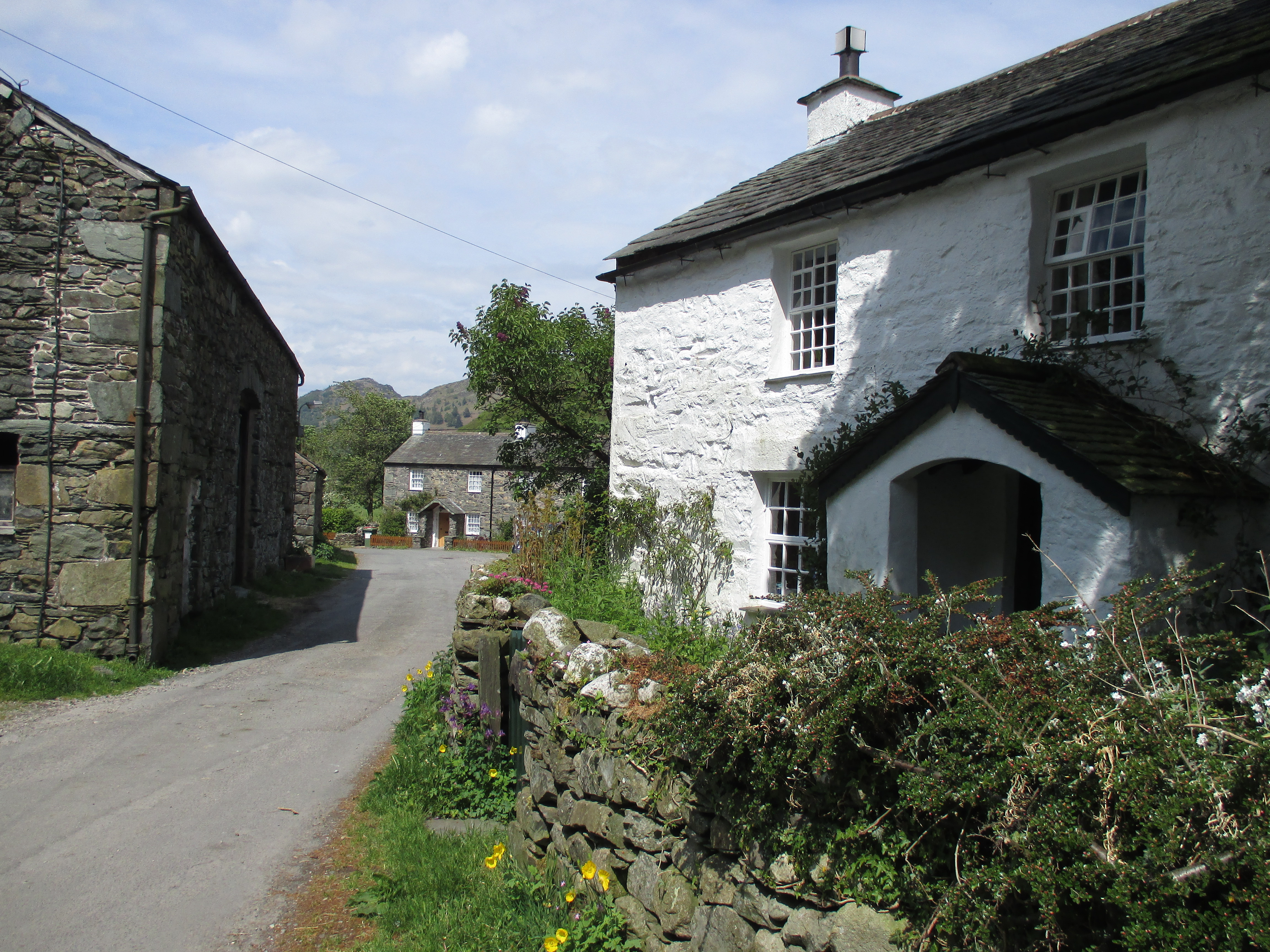
- Stonethwaite's main street

- Location in Allerdale, Cumbria Location within Cumbria
- OS grid reference: NY2613
- Civil parish: Borrowdale
- Unitary authority: Cumberland
- Ceremonial county: Cumbria
- Region: North West
- Country: England
- Sovereign state: United Kingdom
- Post town: KESWICK
- Postcode district: CA12
- Dialling code: 017687
- Police: Cumbria
- Fire: Cumbria
- Ambulance: North West
- UK Parliament: Penrith and Solway

Stonethwaite is a small village in the Lake District in the English county of Cumbria, historically part of Cumberland, it is situated in the valley of the Stonethwaite Beck, a side valley of Borrowdale, and within the Lake District National Park. It is on the Cumbria Way long-distance footpath.

== History ==
The farm at Stonethwaite was once owned by the monks at Fountains Abbey in Yorkshire from 1195 as part of lands they owned in the Borrowdale valley. The monks of Furness complained to King Edward II that they objected to the terms of the ownership of what was now a thriving dairy business. The king did not adjudicate but merely sequestrated the farm and then sold it back to Fountains Abbey in 1304 for two pounds.

== Governance ==
Stonethwaite is within the Penrith and Solway UK parliamentary constituency.

Stonethwaite has its own Parish Council; Borrowdale Parish Council.

== See also ==
- Listed buildings in Borrowdale
