= Honister Pass =

Mountain pass in the Lake District, Cumbria, England

Coordinates: 54°31′N 3°13′W

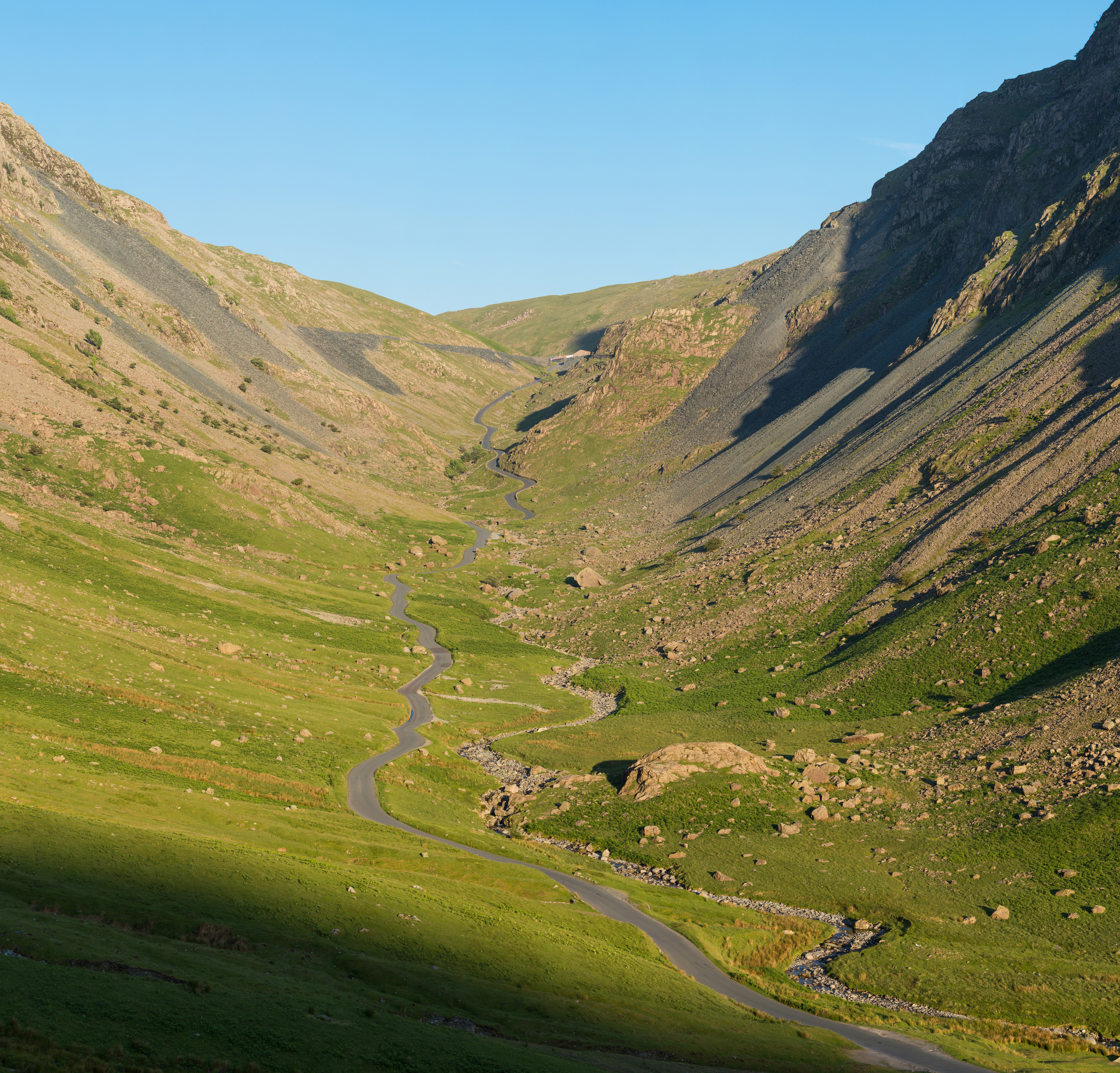
The ascent to the top of the pass from the north-west side

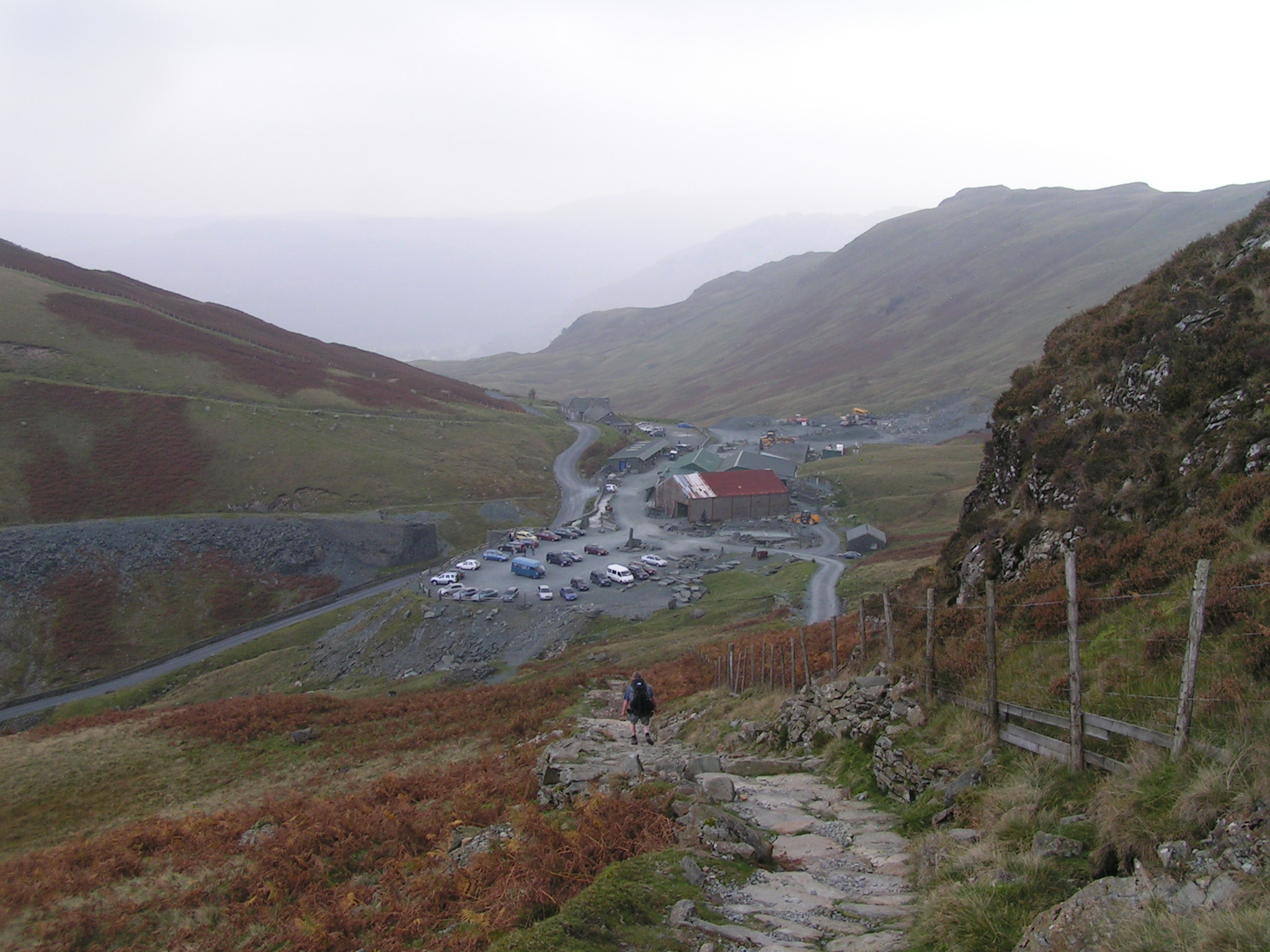
The top of Honister Pass and the slate mine

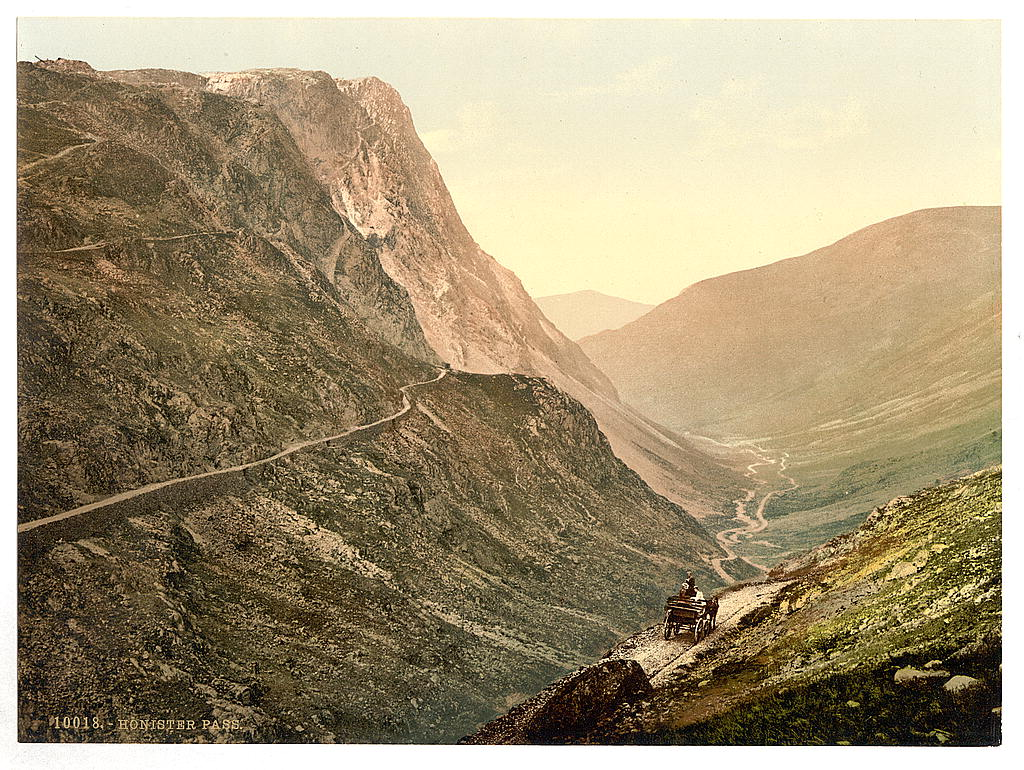
Honister Pass, circa 1895

Honister Pass is a mountain pass in the Lake District in Cumbria, England. It is located on the B5289 road, linking Seatoller, in the valley of Borrowdale, to Gatesgarth at the southern end of Buttermere. The pass reaches an elevation of 1,167 feet (356 m), making it one of the highest in the region, and also one of the steepest, with gradients of up to 1-in-4 (25%). The saddle at the watershed is known as Honister Hause, using the Cumbrian word hause for such a feature.

Honister Pass is one of three passes that link the tourist area around Keswick, including Derwent Water and Borrowdale, with the valley of the River Cocker, including the lakes of Buttermere, Crummock Water and Loweswater. From north to south these passes are Whinlatter Pass, Newlands Pass and Honister Pass.

Honister Slate Mine and Honister Hause Youth Hostel are located at the summit of the pass.

Footpaths lead from the summit of the pass to Fleetwith Pike to the west, Grey Knotts to the south, and Dale Head to the north.

Honister Pass holds the UK 24-hour rainfall record; in the 24 hours to 6 pm on 5 December 2015 during Storm Desmond, 341.4 mm (13.44 in) of rain fell there.

== See also ==
- List of hill passes of the Lake District
