= Grange Fell =

Fell in the Lake District, Cumbria, England

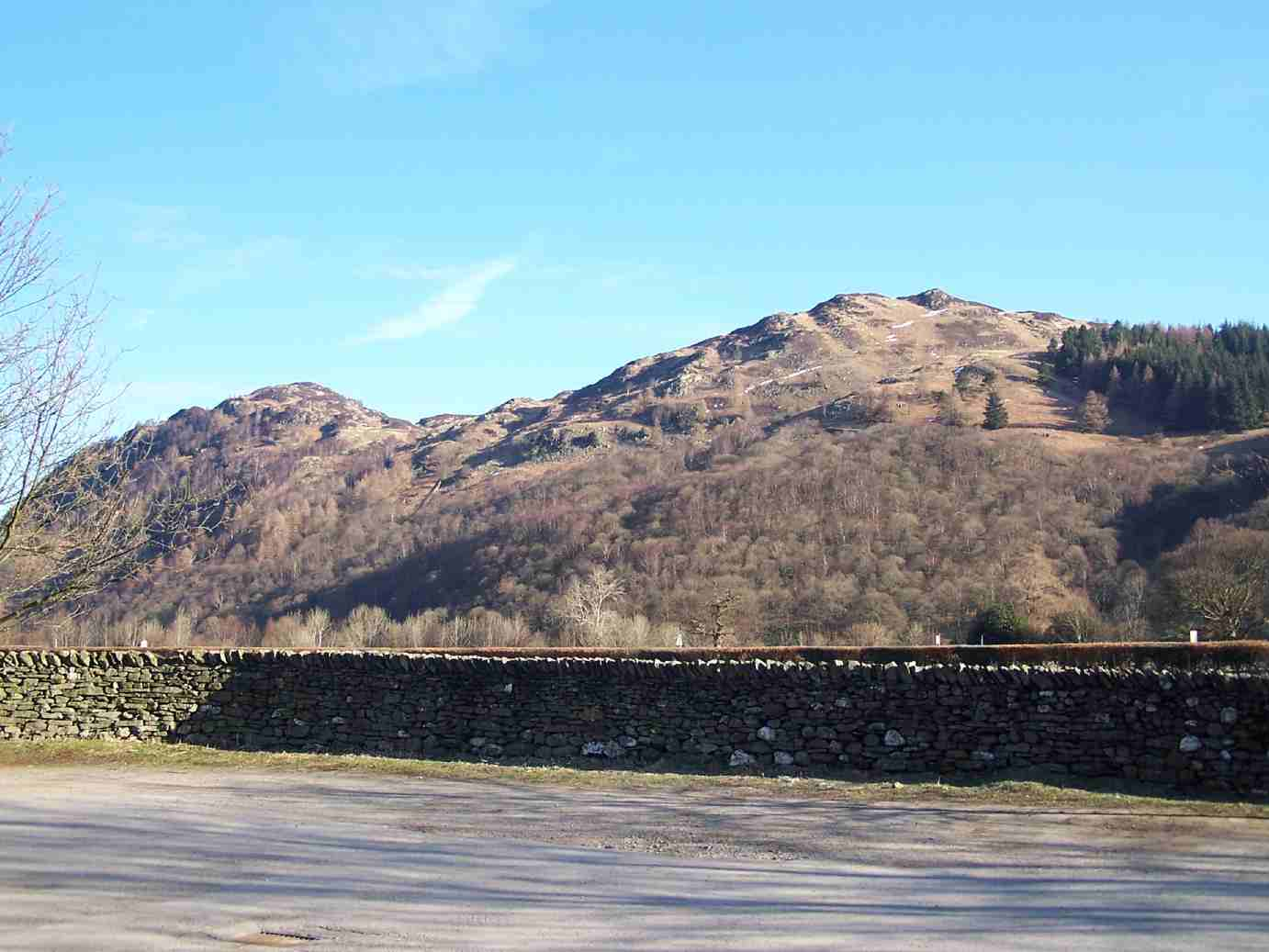
- Grange Fell as seen from Rosthwaite in Borrowdale, King's How is to the left and Brund Fell to the Right

Highest point
- Elevation: 419 m (1,375 ft)
- Prominence: 94 m (308 ft)
- Parent peak: Great Crag
- Listing: Wainwright
- Coordinates: 54°32′40″N 3°07′57″W

Geography
- Location within the Lake District
- Location: Cumbria, England
- Parent range: Lake District, Central Fells
- OS grid: NY268172
- Topo map: OS Explorer OL4

Listed summits of Grange Fell
Name	Grid ref	Height	Status
Ether Knott	NY268172	419 m	separate hill
King's How	NY258167	392 m	hill
Shepherds Crag	NY264185	233 m	hill
Grange Crags	NY256176	194 m	hill

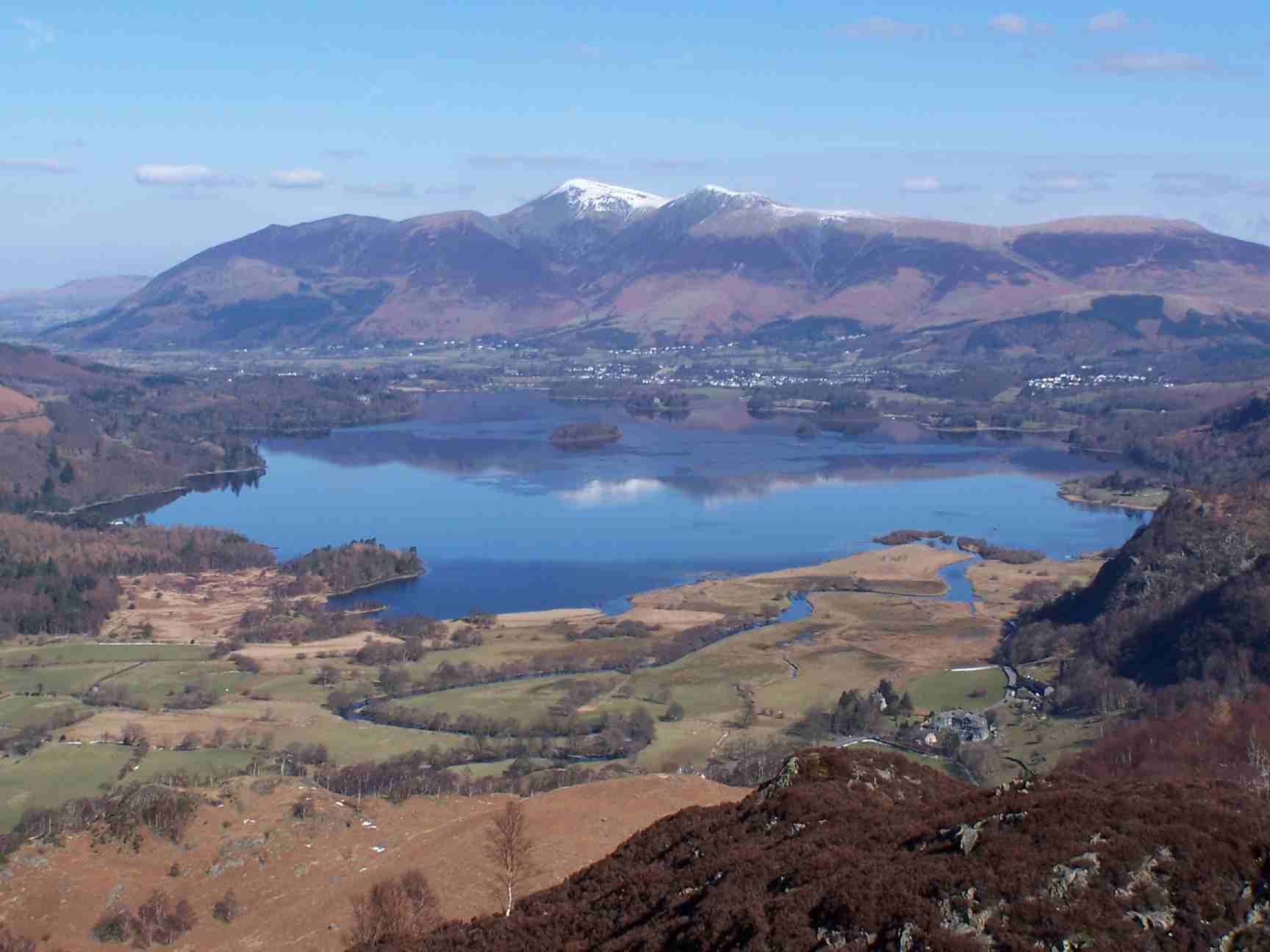
Derwent Water with Skiddaw in the background as seen from Kings How.

Grange Fell is a small fell in the English Lake District in the county of Cumbria, situated in the Borrowdale valley overlooking the villages of Grange in Borrowdale and Rosthwaite.

== Topography ==
The fell has a summit plateau which consist of many heather-covered hummocks, drystone walls and clumps of trees. Well-known Lake District writer Alfred Wainwright credits Grange Fell as a single fell with three main summits, namely Brund Fell, King's How and Ether Knott. The lesser known Ether Knott is now identified as the highest point at a height of 419 metres (1,375 feet) and is less frequently visited by walkers. Brund Fell is at 415 metres (1,362 feet) while King's How is the best viewpoint and has an altitude of 392 metres (1,286 feet). On the other hand, another Lakes walking expert Bill Birkett lists Brund Fell and King's How as separate fells in his “Complete Lakeland Fells” volume, while Mark Richards includes all three.

There are also two small hills on the fringes of the fell, both unfrequented although they lie on access land. Shepherds Crag above the more famous rockface of that name, adjacent to the Lodore Falls and Hotel, and Grange Crags above Grange.

== History ==
Grange Fell is owned by the National Trust and was one of its first acquisitions in the Lake District in 1910; the fell was purchased by public subscription as a memorial to King Edward VII at the bequest of the King's sister Princess Louise, who then was President of the Trust. The magnificent viewpoint of King's How was named after the King as a memorial, and a commemorative slate plaque is situated just below the summit. It reads:

In Loving Memory of King Edward VII, Grange Fell is dedicated by his sister Louise as a sanctuary of rest and peace. Here may all beings gather strength, find in scenes of beautiful nature a cause for gratitude and love to God, giving them courage and vigour to carry on his will.

== Geology ==
The geology of the fell is complex with outcropping of various members of the Birker Fell Formation (andesite lavas), the Eagle Crag Member (siltstone and sandstone conglomerates), and intrusions of dolerite.

== Ascents ==
Ascents of Grange Fell can be started from Rosthwaite, Grange in Borrowdale or Watendlath. The Rosthwaite to Watendlath bridleway can be utilised to its highest point before striking northerly to the summit of Brund Fell following a high dry stone wall for much of the way. The climb from Grange goes through the deciduous woodland at the foot of the fell and skirts round Greatend Crag before reaching King's How and is ranked as one of the "loveliest short walks in the Lake District". The two principal summits of Brund Fell and King's How should both be climbed by any visitor to the fell and they are linked by an undulating path through the hillocks.

== Summit ==
The main summit bears a number of rock tors, protruding sharply from the heathery plateau. King's How has a steep sided domed top. Both bear cairns. The view from the top of the fell takes in Derwentwater with Skiddaw in the background, while Borrowdale and the high fells round its head show well in the opposite direction.
