= Rosthwaite, Borrowdale =

Settlement in Cumbria, England

Coordinates: 54.523522°N 3.146982°W

Rosthwaite
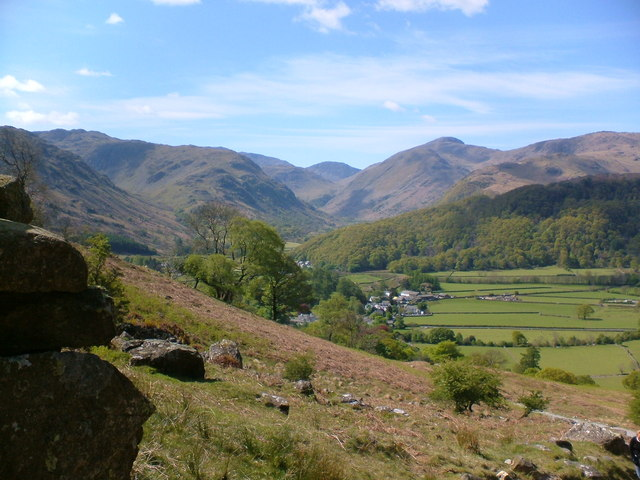
- Rosthwaite

- Location in Cumberland, Cumbria Location within Cumbria
- OS grid reference: NY257148
- Civil parish: Borrowdale
- Unitary authority: Cumberland
- Ceremonial county: Cumbria
- Region: North West
- Country: England
- Sovereign state: United Kingdom
- Post town: KESWICK
- Postcode district: CA12
- Dialling code: 017687
- Police: Cumbria
- Fire: Cumbria
- Ambulance: North West
- UK Parliament: Penrith and Solway

Rosthwaite is a settlement in the Borrowdale parish of Cumberland, Cumbria, England. It is also in Borrowdale in the English Lake District to the south of Derwent Water. The B5289 road goes through the settlement and it is to the east of the Honister Pass.

Historically part of Cumberland, the nearest town to Rosthwaite is Keswick, which is situated approximately 6 miles (9.7 km) to the north.

== Geographical features ==
Rosthwaite is host to many interesting post-glacial geographical features. The town nestles underneath the How, a large roche moutonnée, with a smaller roche moutonnée being further to the west.

Near to and within Rosthwaite is also a set of terminal moraines which show the staggered retreat of the Stonethwaite Glacier. These are quite obvious, with the middle and best preserved moraine being found NY 258145.

== Governance ==
Rosthwaite is within the Penrith and Solway UK Parliamentary constituency.

For Local Government purposes it is in the Keswick Ward of Cumberland Council.

Rosthwaite is parished; Borrowdale Parish Council.

== See also ==
- Listed buildings in Borrowdale
