= Borrowdale =

Valley and civil parish in Cumbria, England

Coordinates: 54°31′50″N 3°09′10″W

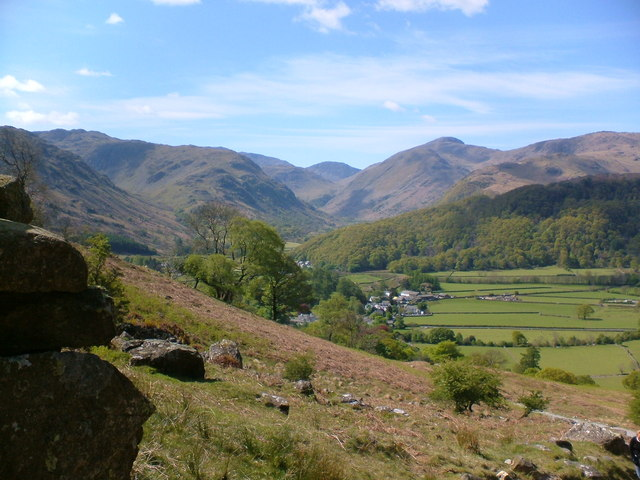
- Rosthwaite

- Location in Allerdale, Cumbria Location within Cumbria
- Population: 417 (2011)
- Civil parish: Borrowdale
- Unitary authority: Cumberland
- Ceremonial county: Cumbria
- Region: North West
- Country: England
- Sovereign state: United Kingdom
- Post town: Keswick
- Postcode district: CA12
- Dialling code: 017687
- Police: Cumbria
- Fire: Cumbria
- Ambulance: North West
- UK Parliament: Penrith and Solway

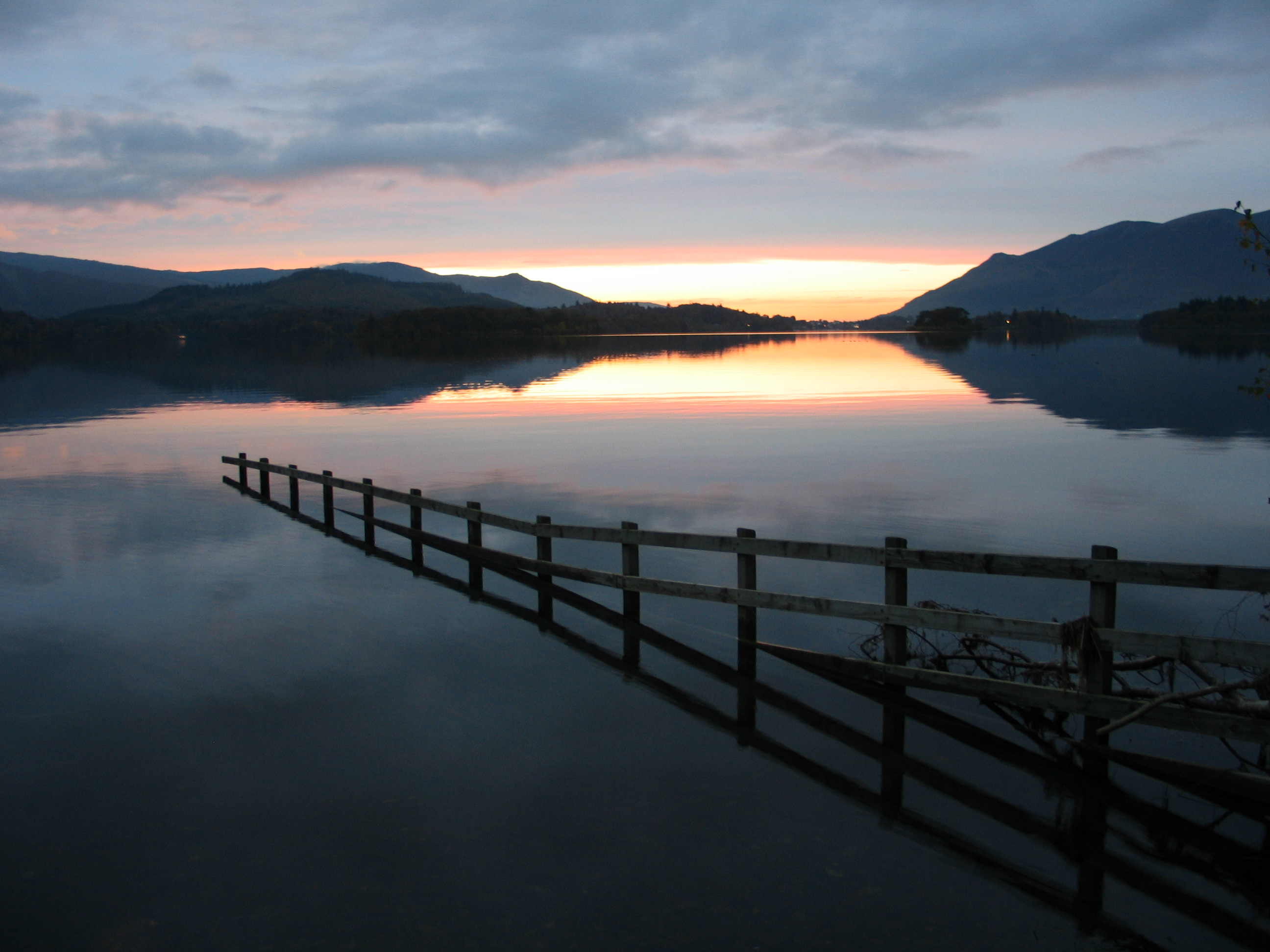
Derwent Water in Borrowdale at dusk

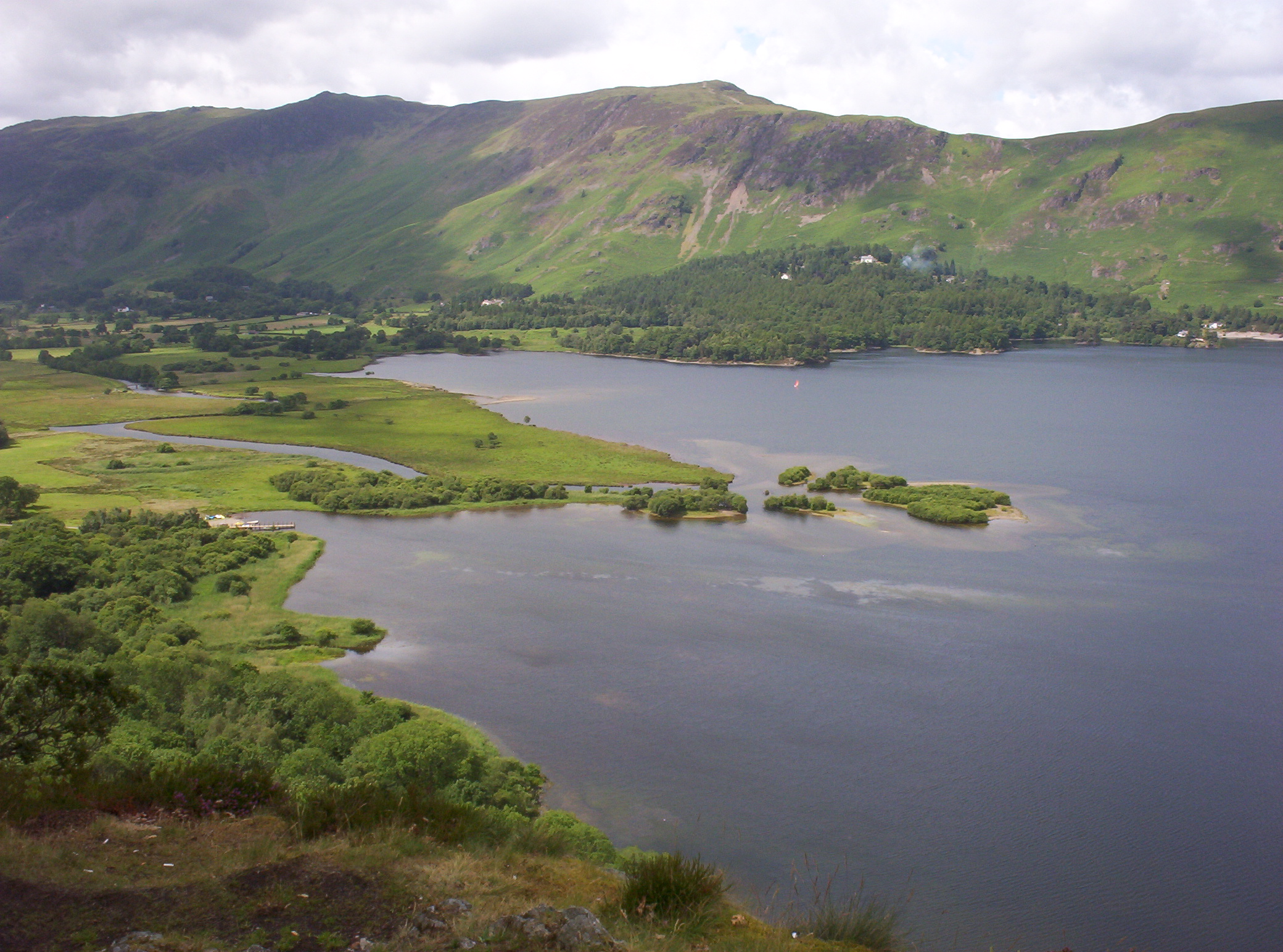
Southern aspect of Derwent Water and fells

Borrowdale is a valley and civil parish in the English Lake District in Cumberland, England. It is in the ceremonial county of Cumbria, and is sometimes referred to as Cumberland Borrowdale to distinguish it from another Borrowdale in the historic county of Westmorland.

== Geography ==
The valley rises in the central Lake District, and runs north carrying the River Derwent into the lake of Derwentwater. The waters of the river have their origins over a wide area of the central massif of the Lake District north of Esk Hause and Stake Pass. These origins include drains from the northern end of Scafell, Great End, the eastern side of the Dale Head massif, the western part of the Central Fells and all the Glaramara ridge. Near Rosthwaite the side valley of Langstrath joins the main valley from Seathwaite before the combined waters negotiate the narrow gap known as the Jaws of Borrowdale. Here it is flanked by the rocky crags of Castle Crag and Grange Fell. The valley then opens out around Grange before the river empties into Derwentwater, overlooked by Catbells, Skiddaw and Walla Crag.

Most of the mountains at the head of Borrowdale, including Scafell Pike and Great Gable, are part of the Borrowdale Volcanic Group, a geological development from the Ordovician period.

The B5289 road runs down the full length of the valley, and at the southern end crosses the Honister Pass to Buttermere. At the heart of the valley is the village of Rosthwaite, other Borrowdale villages include Stonethwaite, Seatoller, Seathwaite, and Grange. The valley also contains the largest remnant of ancient temperate rainforest in England, which was declared a national nature reserve in 2024.

== Governance ==
Borrowdale is within the Penrith and Solway UK parliamentary constituency, while for Local Government purposes it is within the Cumberland unitary authority area.

Borrowdale also has a Parish Council. The civil parish of Borrowdale covers a considerable area around the valley, including the southern half of Derwent Water. It includes the settlements of Grange, Rosthwaite, Seathwaite, Seatoller, Stonethwaite and Watendlath. It lies entirely within the Lake District National Park.

At the time of the 2001 census, the parish had a population of 438 people, living in 137 households. The 2011 Census showed that the population had declined to 417 residents among 128 households.

== Economy ==
The valley is currently a tourist location with hotels, guesthouses, holiday cottages, bed and breakfasts, youth hostels and campsites. It caters to lowland visitors as well as hillwalkers.

Sometime before 1565 (some sources say as early as 1500), a major deposit of graphite was discovered near the Seathwaite hamlet in Borrowdale parish. The locals found that it was useful for marking sheep. The graphite was pure and solid, and it could easily be sawn into sticks; the pencil industry was born in nearby Keswick. The graphite find remains unique.

== In literature ==
In the first of Sir Hugh Walpole's series of four novels Rogue Herries about the Herries family, Borrowdale is the site of a fictional house called Herries, the home of Francis Herries, the protagonist of the novel. Subsequent novels in the series are also largely set in Borrowdale. The valley and its surrounding mountains are described in sympathetic detail.

Walpole himself had a house at Brackenburn, Manesty, overlooking Derwent Water from 1924 until his death in 1941. Hazel Bank Country House was the fictional home of Rogue Herries and birthplace of Judith Paris. Walpole was a friend of the Simpson family, who owned Hazel Bank. This is where Walpole found the inspiration for the "Herries Chronicles".

== See also ==
- Listed buildings in Borrowdale
- The Bowder Stone
