= Whiteless Pike =

Fell in England

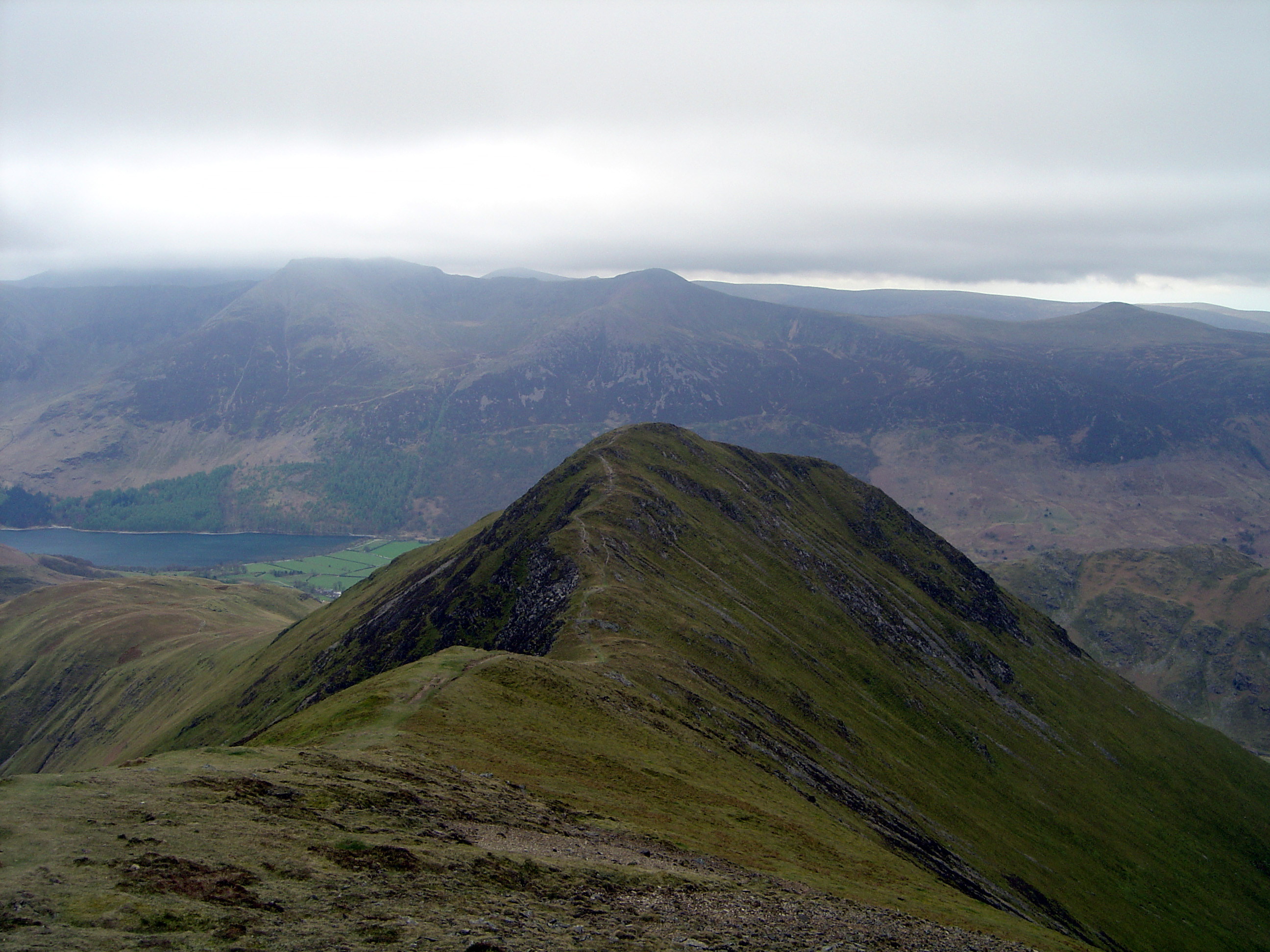
- Whiteless Pike from Whiteless Edge

Highest point
- Elevation: 660 m (2,170 ft)
- Prominence: c. 35 m (115 ft)
- Parent peak: Crag Hill
- Listing: Wainwright, Hewitt, Nuttall
- Coordinates: 54°33′31″N 3°16′10″W

Geography
- Location within the Lake District
- Location: Cumbria, England
- Parent range: Lake District, North Western Fells
- OS grid: NY180189
- Topo map: OS Landranger 89, Explorer OL4

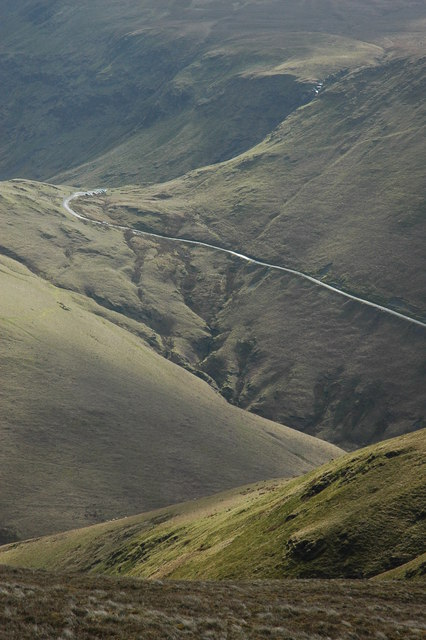
The view over Newlands Pass from just below the summit of Whiteless Pike.

Whiteless Pike, 660 metres (2,170 ft) high, is a fell in the north-western English Lake District. It stands immediately east of Crummock Water and forms a pyramid shape when viewed from Rannerdale. In his celebrated guide to the Lakeland fells, A Wainwright called it "the Weisshorn of Buttermere". There are good views of Great Gable and the Scafells from the summit.

== Topography ==
The North Western Fells occupy the area between the rivers Derwent and Cocker, a broadly oval swathe of hilly country, elongated on a north-south axis. Two roads cross from east to west, dividing the fells into three convenient groups. The central sector, rising between Whinlatter Pass and Newlands Pass, includes Whiteless Pike.

The highest ground in the North Western Fells is an east-west ridge in this central sector, beginning with Grasmoor above Crummock Water and then gradually descending eastwards over Crag Hill, Sail, Scar Crags and Causey Pike. Grasmoor has the greatest elevation, but Crag Hill stands at the hub of the range. It sends out a subsidiary ridge to the south west, stepping down over Wandope and Whiteless Pike toward Buttermere village.

From the broad plateau of Wandope, the fine and airy ridge of Whiteless Edge descends south west to the depression at Saddle Gate (2,065 ft / 629 m). A short climb then leads to the summit of Whiteless Pike. The ridge now turns south and falls to the wide shoulder of Whiteless Breast (1,440 ft / 440 m), from where the slope continues down to Buttermere village. This is not however the end of the ridge, which twists sharply north west to continue to Rannerdale Knotts. Both sides of the ridge are steep throughout.

The eastern face of the fell drains via several feeders into Sail Beck, bound for Crummock Water via Buttermere Village. The north western flanks supply Rannerdale Beck, another feeder of Crummock Water which flows between Whiteless Pike and Grasmoor. The sharp elbow in the ridge, between Whiteless Pike and Rannerdale Knotts, forms the head of Squat Beck, a tributary of Rannerdale.

== Geology ==
The summit of the fell is a part of the Kirkstile Formation, Ordovician rocks of the Skiddaw group. This is primarily laminated mudstone and siltstone. The Causey Pike Fault runs across to the south and Whiteless Breast and the lower slopes are examples of the Buttermere Formation, an olistostrome of disrupted sheared and folded mudstone, siltstone and sandstone. Within this are minor intrusions of basalt... There is no history of mining on the fell.

== Summit ==
Whiteless Pike has a small peaked summit overlain with loose stones and bearing a cairn. The steep slopes add foreground to the view, which includes a fine prospect of the Scafells. The Helvellyn range and Western Fells are well seen, with the rather drab close-up of Grasmoor perhaps the only disappointment. Buttermere, Crummock and Loweswater complete the view.

== Ascents ==
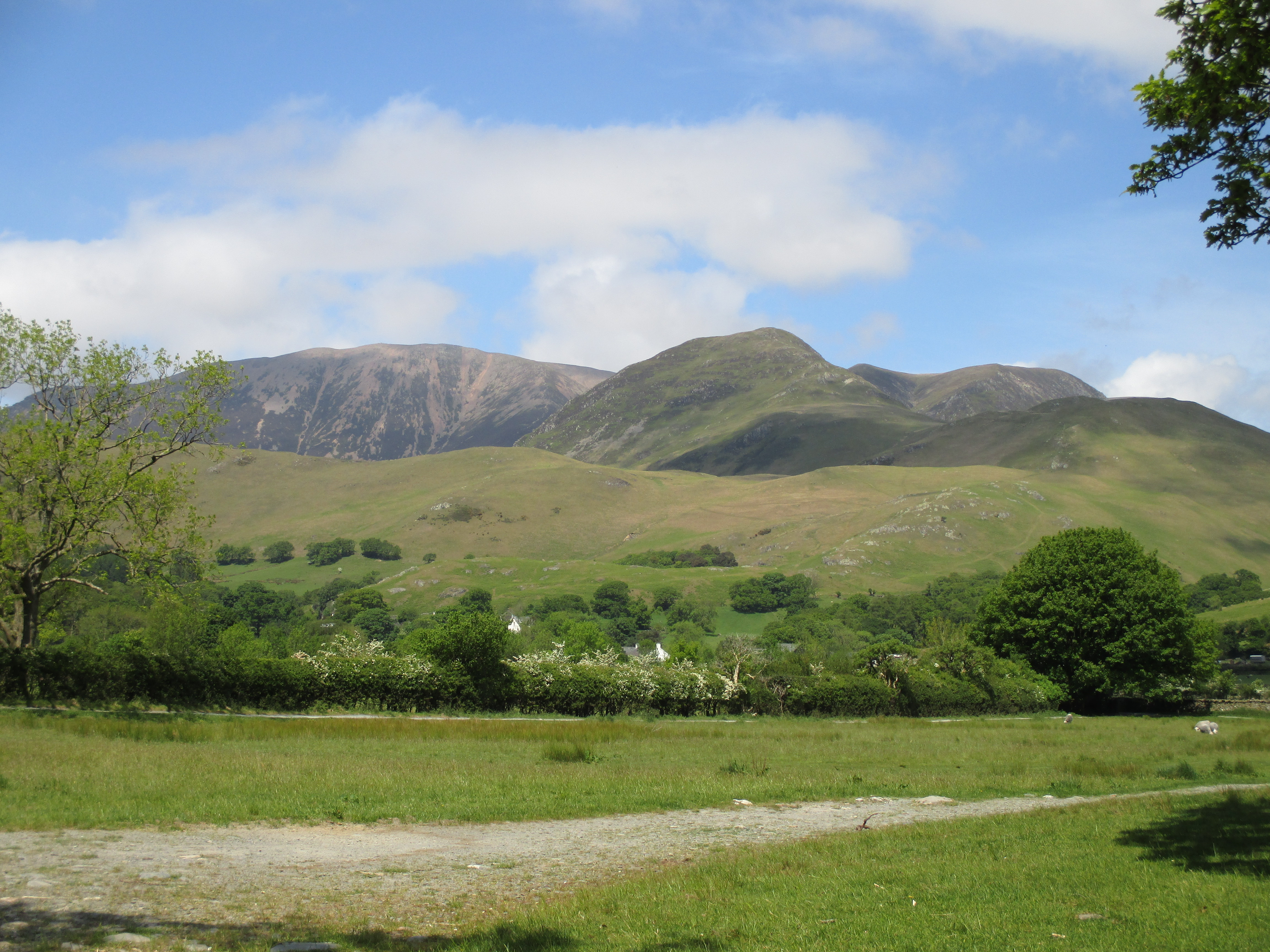
Whiteless Pike seen from the foot of Buttermere, with the summit of Grasmoor on the left

Buttermere provides the obvious starting point, climbing on a good path up Whiteless Breast and onto the ridge. From the shore of Crummock Water, access can be gained into Rannerdale, branching off up the course of Squat Beck to the elbow in the ridge between Rannerdale Knotts and Whiteless Pike. Circuits of Rannerdale via the complete ridge of Rannerdale Knotts can also be made.
