= Wandope =

Fell in the Lake District, Cumbria, England

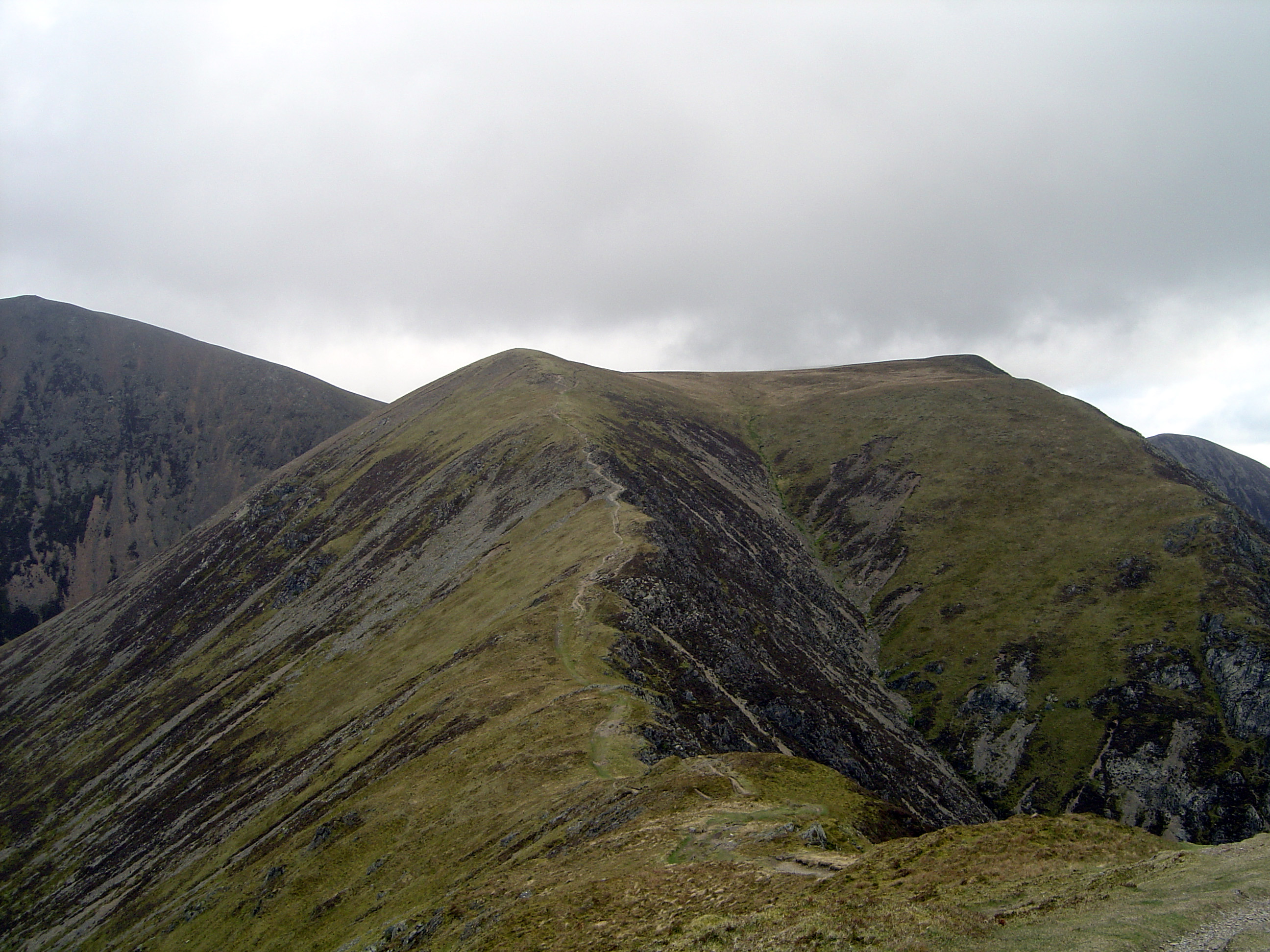
- Whiteless Edge & Wandope from Whiteless Pike

Highest point
- Elevation: 772 m (2,533 ft)
- Prominence: c. 30 m (100 ft)
- Parent peak: Crag Hill
- Listing: Wainwright, Hewitt, Nuttall
- Coordinates: 54°33′58″N 3°15′26″W

Geography
- Location within the Lake District Location within the former Allerdale Borough
- Location: Cumbria, England
- Parent range: Lake District, North Western Fells
- OS grid: NY188197
- Topo map: OS Landranger 89, Explorer OL4

Wandope (also known as Wanlope is a fell in the north-western area of the English Lake District. It lies to the east of Crummock Water and south of Crag Hill. From the summit there are excellent panoramas of the Sca Fell and High Stile ranges.

== Topography ==
The North Western Fells occupy the area between the rivers Derwent and Cocker, a broadly oval swathe of hilly country, elongated on a north–south axis. Two roads cross from east to west, dividing the fells into three convenient groups. The central sector, rising between Whinlatter Pass and Newlands Pass, includes Wandope.

The highest ground in the North Western Fells is an east–west ridge in this central sector, beginning with Grasmoor above Crummock Water and then gradually descending eastwards over Crag Hill, Sail, Scar Crags and Causey Pike. Grasmoor has the greatest elevation, but Crag Hill stands at the hub of the range. It sends out a subsidiary ridge to the south west, stepping down over Wandope and Whiteless Pike toward Buttermere village.

Wandope is not prominent in views from below and from most directions appears subservient to its higher neighbours. The connection to Crag Hill is the broad plateau of Wandope Moss, sloping down easily to the west. On the opposite side is the striking feature of Addacomb Hole. This symmetrical hanging valley resembles a half crater, its headwall being 700 feet (210 m) high.

The ridge south westward from Wandope is divided into two by Third Gill. The eastern branch is a short blunt ended spur, but the western arm narrows to the fine airy ridge of Whiteless Edge. This makes straight for the summit of Whiteless Pike across the col of Saddle Gate (2,065 feet; 629 m). The flanks of the ridge are steep and rough throughout, but with more exposed rock to the east.

All of the run-off from the fell finds its way ultimately to Crummock Water, the Derwent-Cocker watershed ignoring Wandope in favour of the onward connection from Crag Hill to Ard Crags. Sail Beck carries the water from the south and east, running out from between Knott Rigg and Whiteless Pike into Buttermere village. Addacomb Beck and Third Gill are the tributaries which mark the northern and southern boundaries of Wandope on this flank. To the north and west of the fell is Rannerdale Beck, disgorging its flow direct into the centre section of the lake.

== Geology ==
The summit areas of Wandope are composed of the Ordovician Kirkstile Formation. This is the typical rock of the Skiddaw fells and is composed of laminated mudstone and siltstone. Beneath this are the Greywacke sandstone turbidites of the Loweswater Formation. The Causey Pike Fault runs across the southern flanks of the fell, beyond which are the rocks of the Buttermere Formation.

== Summit ==
A small cairn marks the summit, a few yards in from the fall into Addacomb Hole. The view north is blocked by Grasmoor and Crag Hill, but a mountain view extends in all other directions. The Scafells are perhaps the highlight from this vantage point.

== Ascents ==
Buttermere is the obvious starting point for climbing Wandope, and several routes are available. Sail Beck and then Third Gill can be followed to give a toehold on the shorter eastern branch of the south west ridge. Alternatively Sail Beck can be followed further up the valley until Addacomb Beck is reached. Above this point a fine ridge can be seen, skirting the southern rim of Addacomb Hole.

Indirect routes are also popular, and Wandope can either be added to the traverse of the Grasmoor-Causey Pike ridge, or taken on a circuit of Rannerdale.
