= Sail (Lake District) =

Hill in the Lake District, England

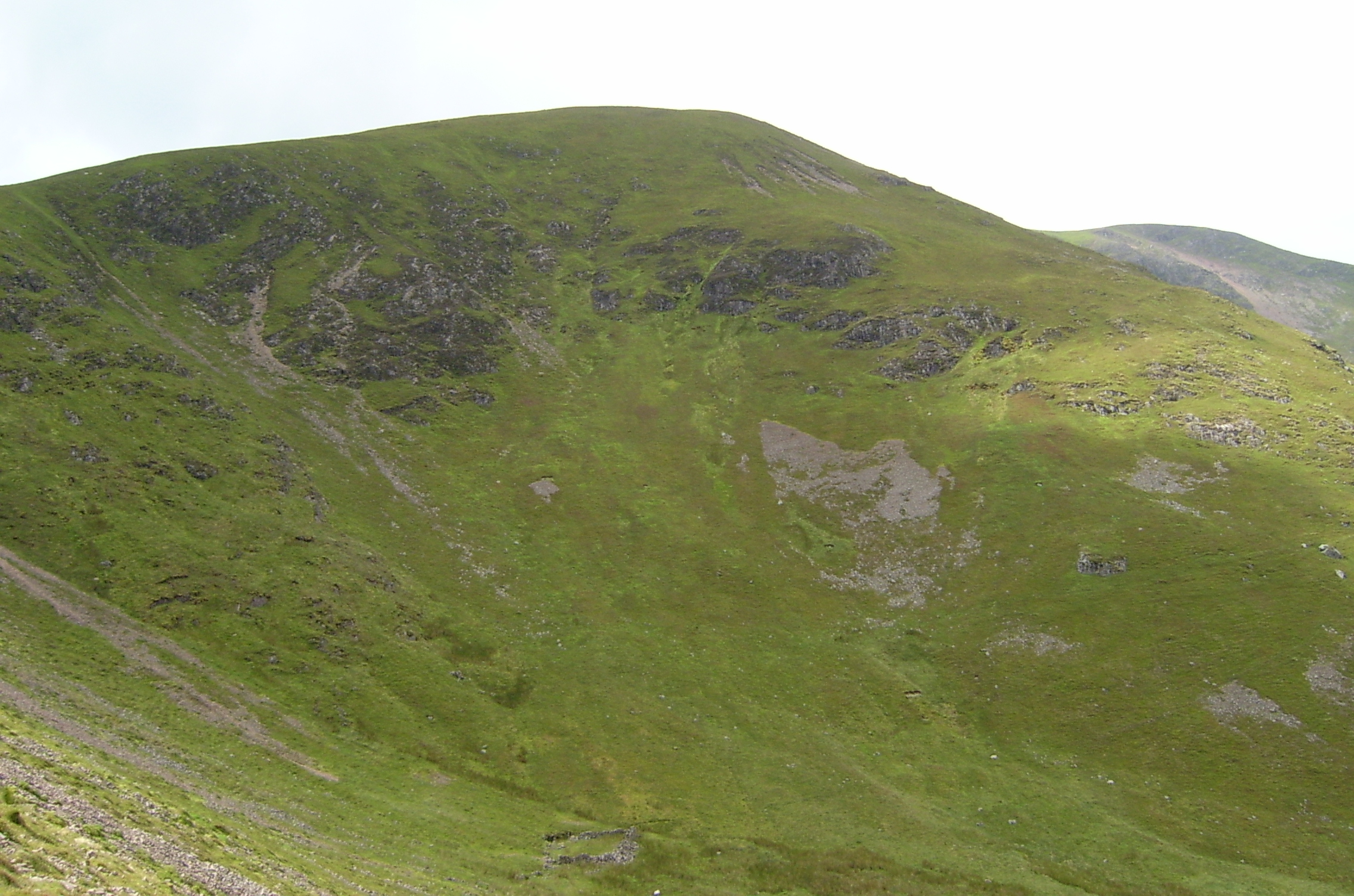

Highest point
- Elevation: 773 m (2,536 ft)
- Prominence: 32 m (105 ft)
- Parent peak: Crag Hill
- Listing: Wainwright, Hewitt, Nuttall
- Coordinates: 54°34′16″N 3°14′31″W

Geography
- Location within the Lake District Location within the former Allerdale Borough
- Location: Cumbria, England
- Parent range: Lake District, North Western Fells
- OS grid: NY198204
- Topo map: OS Landranger 89, 90, Explorer OL4

Sail is a hill in the English Lake District, lying between Derwentwater and Crummock Water.

== Topography ==
The North Western Fells occupy the area between the rivers Derwent and Cocker, a broadly oval swathe of hilly country, elongated on a north-south axis. Two roads cross from east to west, dividing the fells into three convenient groups. The central sector, rising between Whinlatter Pass and Newlands Pass, includes Sail. The highest ground in the North Western Fells is an east-west ridge in this central sector, beginning with Grasmoor above Crummock Water and then gradually descending eastwards over Crag Hill, Sail, Scar Crags and Causey Pike.

Sail is in every sense a satellite of Crag Fell, although having sufficient prominence to be listed as a Hewitt. From the summit of Crag Hill the eastward ridge narrows between opposing walls of crag. This rocky crest is The Scar, the depression being at around 2,425 feet (739 m). The roughness decreases as the rounded top of Sail is reached, and the ridge then turns east north east. A further depression at 2,015 feet (614 m) leads to the summit of Scar Crags. This col is unnamed on maps of the Ordnance Survey, but Alfred Wainwright termed it Sail Pass in his influential Pictorial Guide to the Lakeland Fells

Sail has a further connection to the south of the main ridge, a high level bridge to Ard Crags. Ard Crags and its neighbour, Knott Rigg, form a lower parallel ridge to the south of the main range.

The main drainage to the north of Sail runs to Coledale. This is a long uninhabited valley which exits into the floodplain of the Derwent at the village of Braithwaite. Near its head are two successive steps of crag, each bearing a waterfall. The southern flanks of the fell are drained by Sail Beck and its tributaries, flowing south west between the slopes of Wandope and Knott Rigg to Buttermere village. Sail thus stands on the main watershed of the North Western Fells, a virtue not shared by the higher Grasmoor.

Sail's slopes are steep and rough throughout, with the ridge to Crag Fell being bounded by rock, Scott Crag to the north and Scar Crag to the south. The other principal face is Long Crag which overlooks High Moss and Outerside.

== Geology ==
The summit areas of Sail are composed of the Ordovician Kirkstile Formation. This is the typical rock of the Skiddaw fells and is composed of laminated mudstone and siltstone. Beneath this are the Greywacke sandstone turbidites of the Loweswater Formation. The Causey Pike Fault runs across the southern flanks of the fell, beyond which are the rocks of the Buttermere Formation. This is an olistostrome of disrupted sheared and folded mudstone, siltstone and sandstone.

On the northern side of Sail Pass are the remains of a cobalt mine. The vein runs north-south and, although showing some cobalt, was found to contain a great deal more arsenic. The mine was opened in 1848, after great sums had been spent on a roadway and dressing plant. The total yield of cobalt was only a few ounces and the venture was swiftly abandoned. Several levels can be seen at the surface.

Force Crag mine in Coledale was a much more successful enterprise, but is properly within the territory of Hopegill Head.

== Summit ==
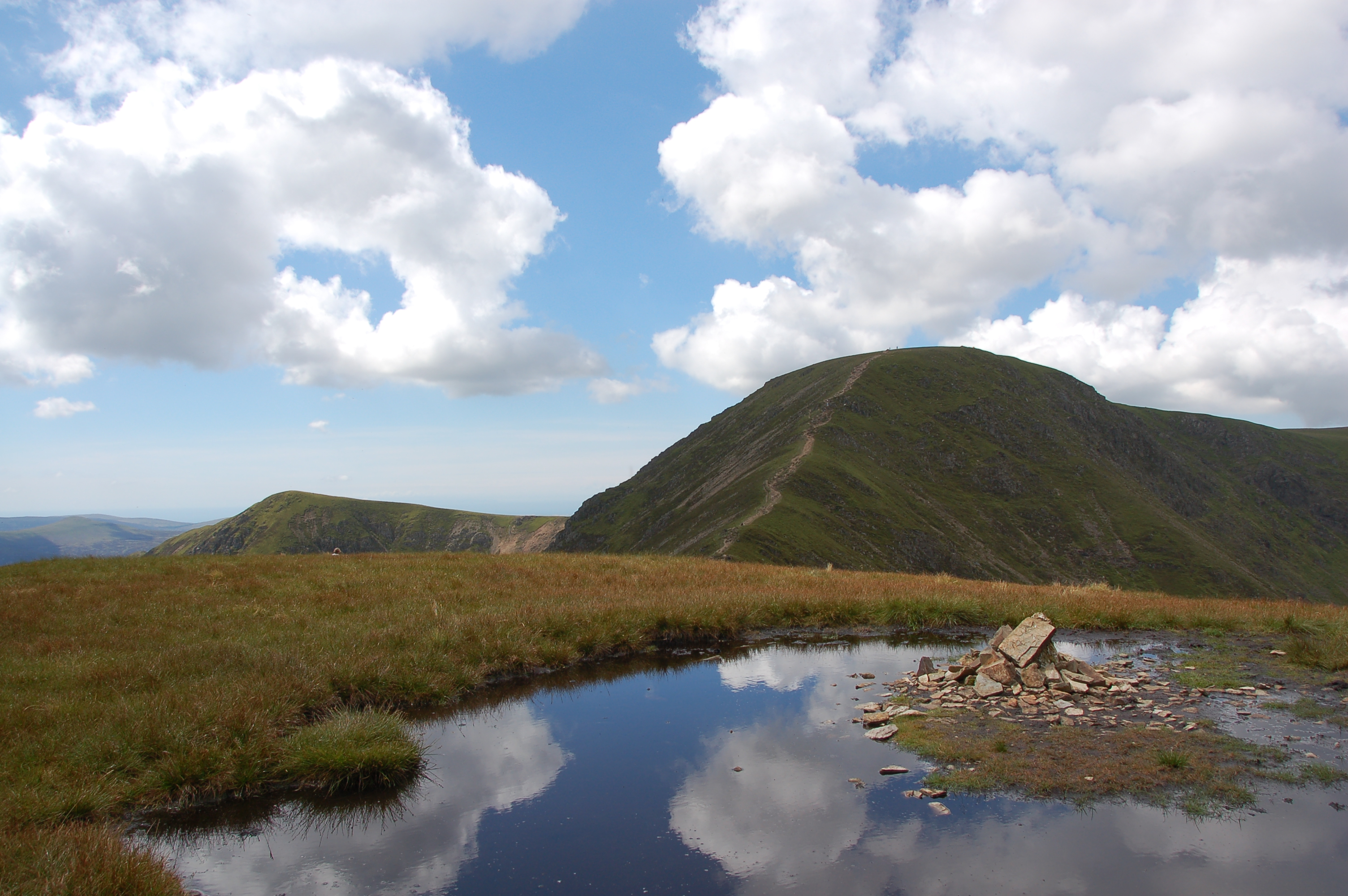
The summit of Sail and the view towards Crag Hill and Wandope.

The top of Sail is a heathery dome bearing a small cairn. The main path along the ridge passes by to the south to take its heavily eroded course up Crag Hill. The view, other than where blocked by this lower neighbour, is excellent. The head of Coledale is laid out to the north while eastward is the full sweep of the Helvellyn range above Catbells. The High fells around Ennerdale, Wasdale and the head of Eskdale complete the panorama southward. Bassenthwaite Lake can be seen from the summit and a few steps will bring Buttermere and Derwentwater into view.

== Ascents ==
Perhaps most walkers will arrive at Sail as part of a ridge-top traverse, starting either with Grasmoor or Causey Pike. Direct routes from the north east begin at either Braithwaite or Stair. From the former the track to High Coledale Farm is the initial objective, before crossing the Outerside ridge in the vicinity of Stile End. The path then rises to Sail Pass from the north. Starting from Stair, the Stoneycroft Mine Road also gives access to Sail Pass, via the cobalt mine. From Buttermere village a long walk up Sail Beck and 'behind' Ard Crags can be used to gain Sail Pass from the other side.

== See also ==
- Coledale horseshoe
