= Ard Crags =

Fell in Cumbria, England

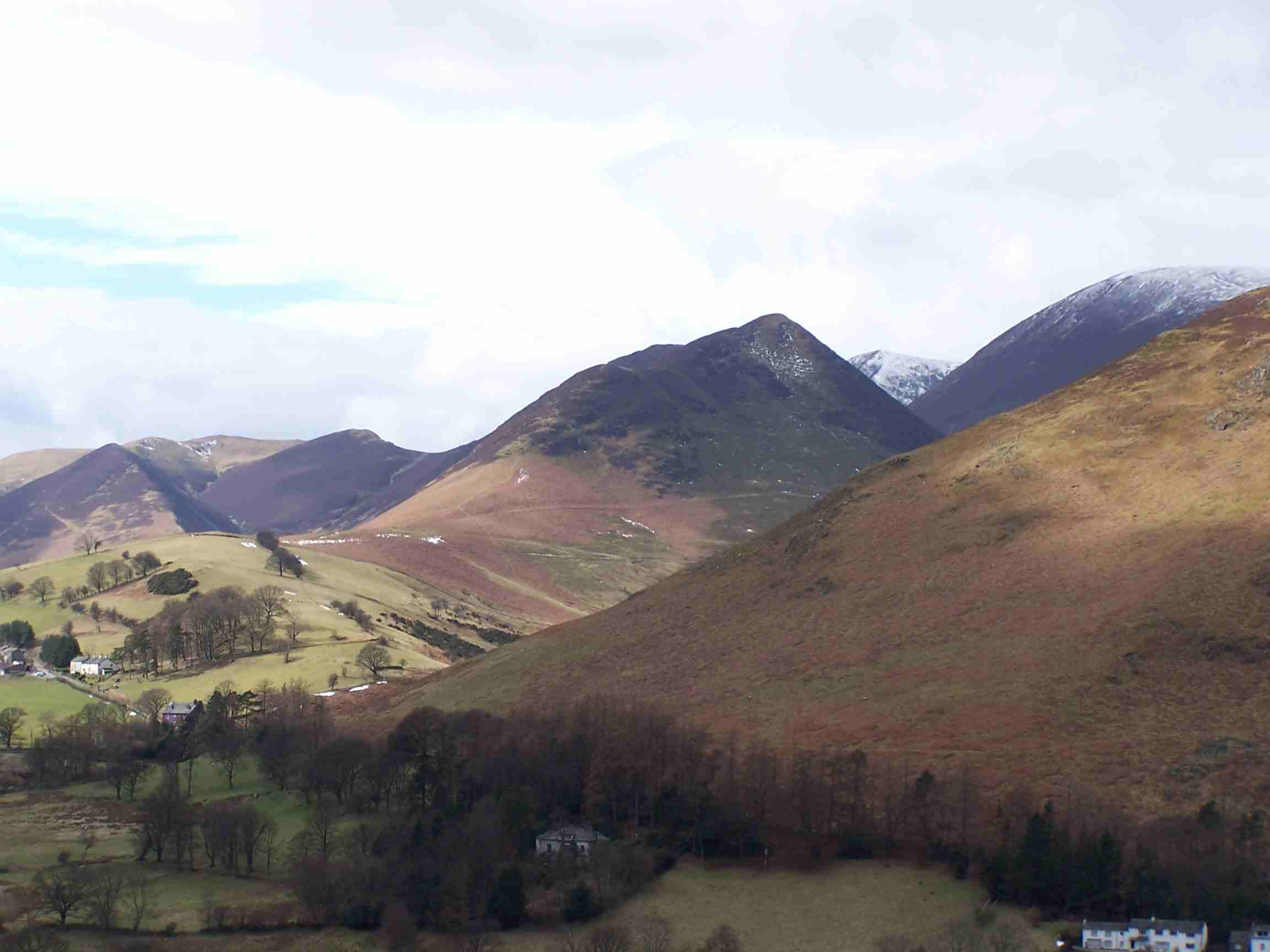
- Ard Crags seen from Skelgill in the Newlands Valley

Highest point
- Elevation: 581 m (1,906 ft)
- Prominence: c. 120 metres (390 ft)
- Parent peak: Grasmoor
- Listing: Wainwright
- Coordinates: 54°33′59″N 3°13′46″W

Geography
- Location within the Lake District
- Location: Cumbria, England
- Parent range: Lake District, North Western Fells
- OS grid: NY206197
- Topo map: OS Landranger 89, 90 OS Explorer 4

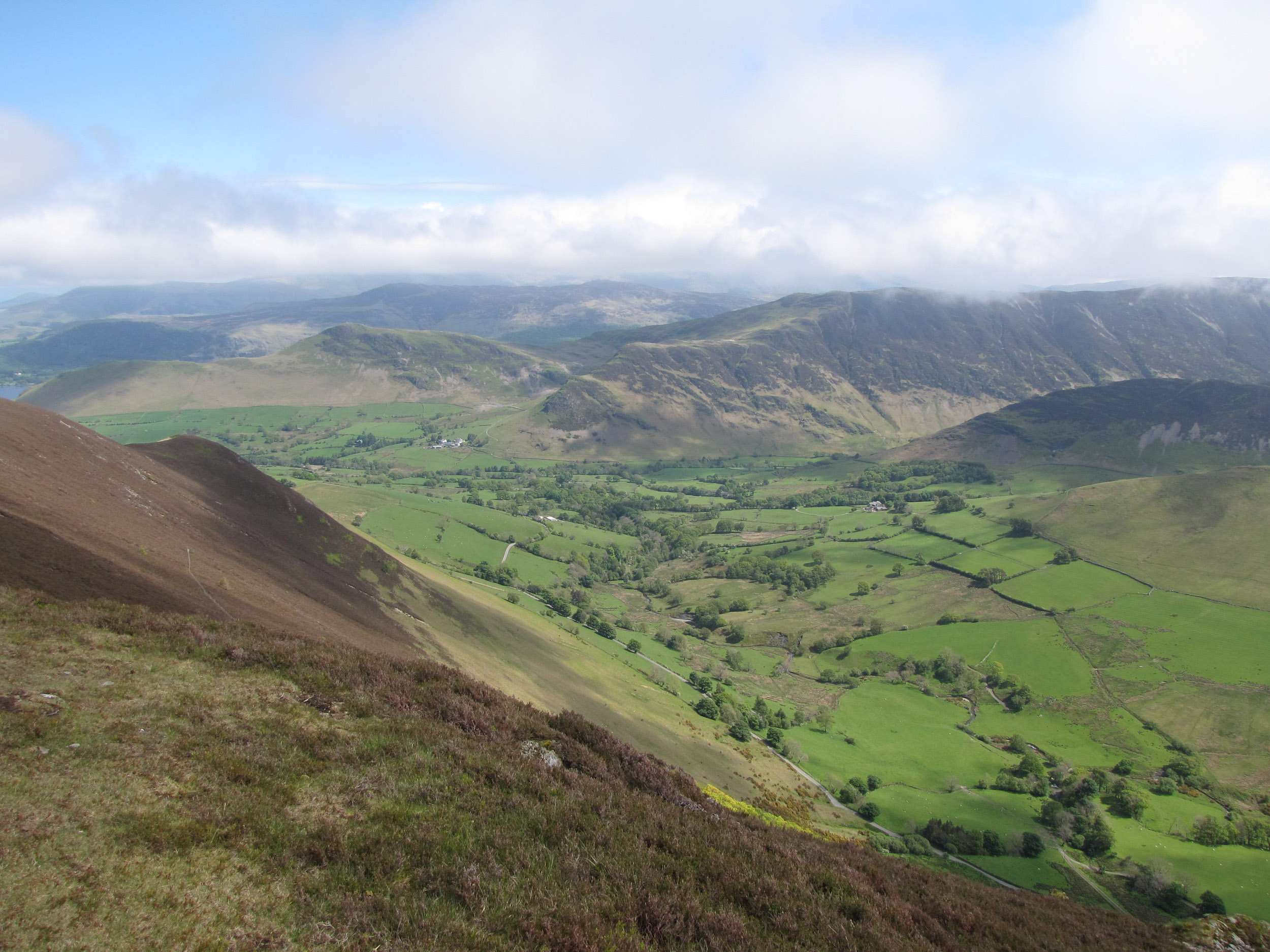
The view east from the summit to the Newlands Valley.

Ard Crags is a fell in the Lake District in Cumbria, England, it is situated in the Newlands Valley just off the minor road between Keswick and Buttermere. The Ordnance Survey officially records the fell's altitude at 581 metres (1,906 ft), considerably more than the approximate 1,860 feet (570 m) that Alfred Wainwright attributed to it in his Pictorial Guide to the North Western Fells, published in 1964 well before the advent of satellite mapping. Ard Crags is situated close to other higher fells such as Causey Pike and Eel Crag and can be easily overlooked. However, viewed from certain points in the Rigg Beck or Newlands valley area it presents a clearly defined and pyramidal shape which catches the eye.

== Topography ==
A long high ridge sweeps east from Whiteless Pike, via Wandope, Crag Hill, Sail (Lake District) and Causey Pike, crossing from Buttermere to Stair. Running parallel to the south is a lower ridge, a tenuous connection made centrally at Sail. This lower ridge consists of Knott Rigg and Ard Crags, and has a beautiful narrow and airy character. Ard Crags forms the eastern half of the ridge, rising between Keskadale and the side valley of Rigg Beck. It is sometimes referred to as Aikin Knott, the name of the rash of rock on the nose of the ridge.

== Geology ==
The Ard Crags ridge is an example of the Buttermere Formation, an olistostrome of disrupted, sheared and folded mudstone, siltstone and sandstone.

== Ascents ==
The fell is linked by a ridge to another “Wainwright” fell, Knott Rigg and most walkers will climb both hills together in the same walk. There are two possible starting points, one is at Rigg Beck in Newlands, near the site of the eccentrically painted “purple house” which was destroyed by fire in June 2008. This route goes directly up the eastern ridge passing the outcrop of Aikin Knott after which the ridge narrows considerably to reach the heather covered summit which gives a precipitous view of Newlands. The alternative starting point is the car park at Newlands Hause which stands at an altitude of 333 metres (1,093 ft), the summit of Knott Rigg is crossed first before continuing onto Ard Crags.

== Summit ==
The narrow ridge is carpeted with heather, the top marked by a small cairn. The view from the summit is severely restricted in a north and westerly direction by the higher Eel Crag to Causey Pike ridge, the best feature of the view is the aerial view of the Newlands valley while Scafell Pike can be glimpsed 8 miles (13 km) away through a gap in the hills to the south.
