= Buttermere Fells =

Protected area in Cumbria, England

- Site of Special Scientific Interest
- Location within Cumbria
- Location of Buttermere Fells.
- Area of search: Cumbria
- Grid reference: NY200195
- Coordinates: 54.564377°N 3.2387551°W
- Area: 15,008.7 acres (61 km^{2}; 23 sq mi)
- Notification date: 1989

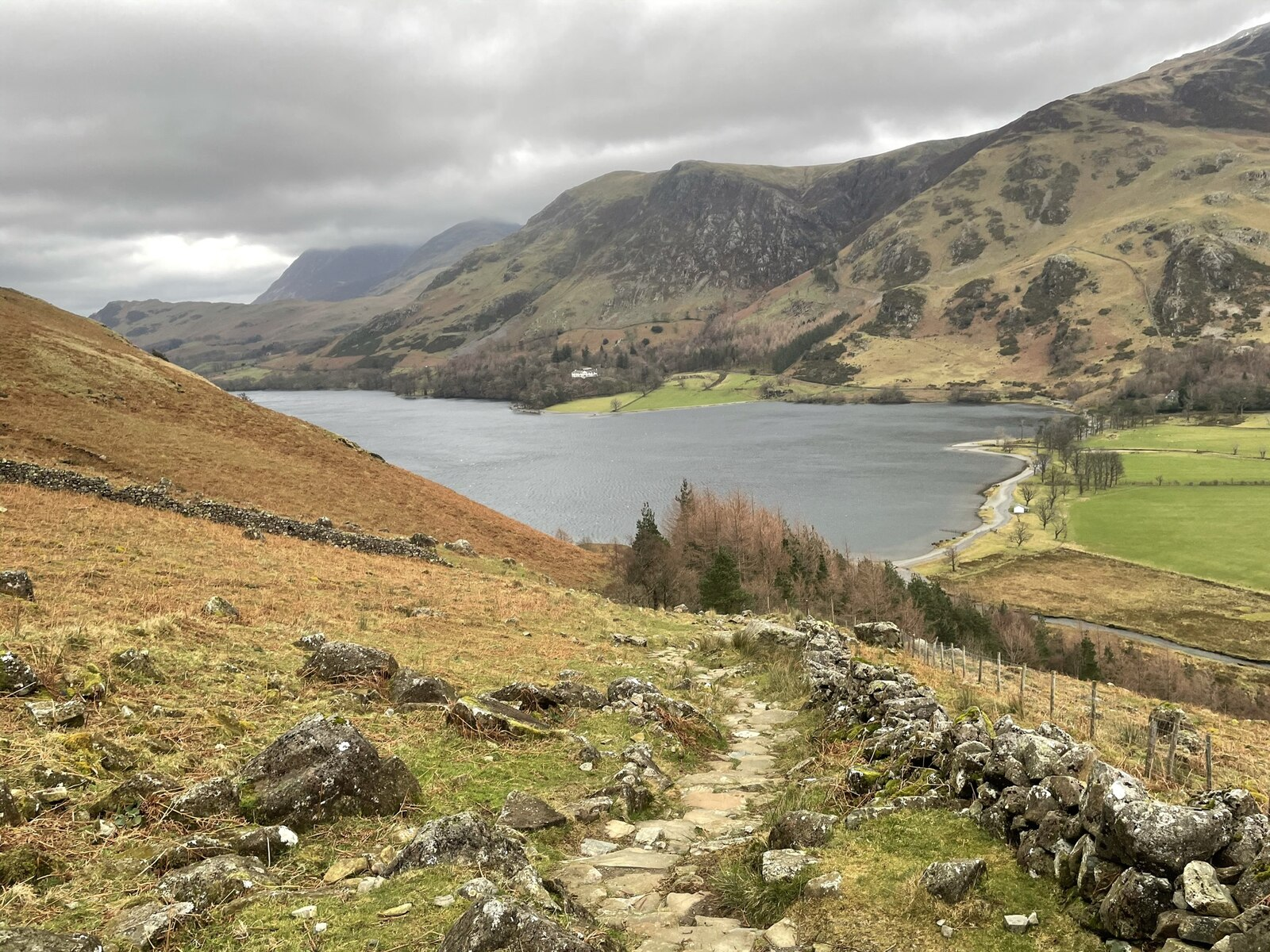
Buttermere Fell

Buttermere Fells is a Site of Special Scientific Interest (SSSI) within Lake District National Park in Cumbria, England. The protected area includes many of the hills and mountains between the Buttermere lake valley near the village of Buttermere and the River Derwent valley near the village of Braithwaite. This protected area includes the mountains of Grasmoor, Crag Hill, Causey Pike and Hindscarth. The protected area includes much of the North Western Fells. This protected area contains exceptional examples of montane dwarf shrub heath communities.

The northern section of this protected area includes part of Whinlatter Forest.

Part of Buttermere Fells SSSI was previously notified as Keskdale and Birkrigg Oaks SSSI.

== Biology ==
Buttermere Fells SSSI has extensive acid-loving heaths. Plants in these heaths include bilberry, crowberry, lingonberry, dwarf juniper, cross-leaved heath and bearberry. Moss species in these heaths include Hylocomium splendens, Pleurozium schreberi and Plagiothecium undulatum. The club-moss species Diphasiastrum alpinum and Huperzia selago are also found here.

Blanket bog is infrequent in this protected area, but on High Scawdel there is blanket bog with pools where the plants bogbean and round-leaved sundew have been recorded. Mosses in these blanket bog habitats include Sphagnum papillosum, Sphagnum capillifolium and Sphagnum cuspidatum.

On high ridges, plant species include dwarf willow and the moss species Racomitrium lanuginosum, that is now confined to two patches. Plant species on cliffs include alpine catchfly and alpine cinquefoil.

Woodlands where sessile oak dominates are found near Keskadale and Birkrigg. They are relics of previously extensive high level woodland. In these woodlands, the moss species Hedwigia integrifolia and the lichen species Alectoria chalybeiformis and Usuea frugilescens have been recorded.

Bird species recorded in this protected area include peregrine, merlin, raven, dotterel and twite.

== Geology ==
Much of the rocks within Buttermere Fells SSSI are Skiddaw Slates and in this region, these rocks have a strong tendency to form cliffs. Weathering of Skiddaw Slates produces acidic soils, hence supporting extensive acid-loving heaths.

== Land ownership ==
Most of the land within Buttermere Fells SSSI is owned by the National Trust. The section of Whinlatter forest within Buttermere Fells SSSI (Hobcarton End) is on land owned by the Forestry Commission. Management plans for Whinlatter forest include restoration of habitat in felled areas at Hobcarton End.
