= Whiteside (Lake District) =

Fell in Cumbria, England

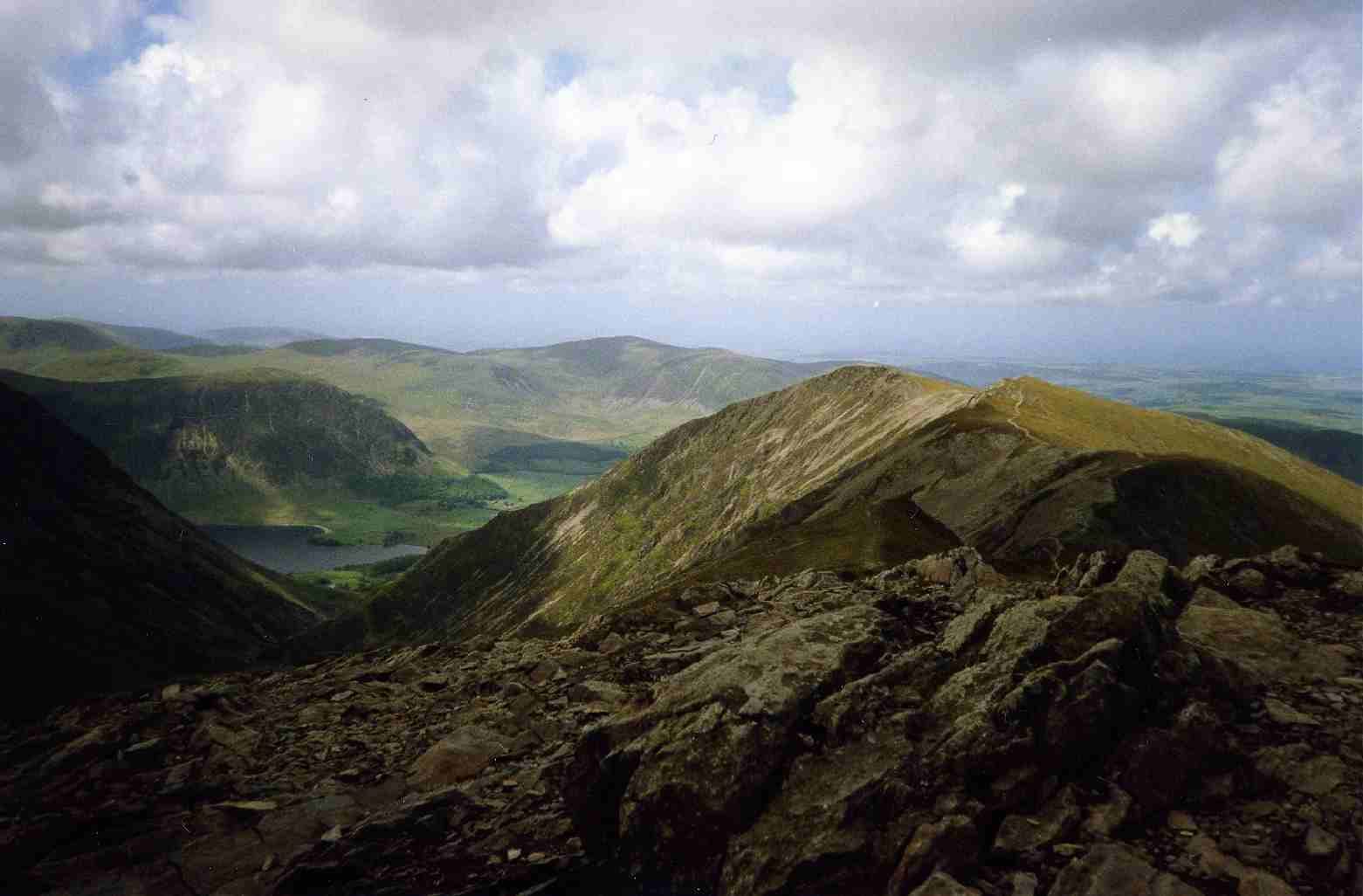
- Looking along the ridge from Hopegill Head to Whiteside. The east top is visible midway along

Highest point
- Elevation: 719 m (2,359 ft)
- Prominence: 34 m (112 ft)
- Parent peak: Hopegill Head
- Listing: Wainwright, Hewitt, Nuttall
- Coordinates: 54°35′13″N 3°16′44″W

Geography
- Location within the Lake District
- Location: Cumbria, England
- Parent range: Lake District, North Western Fells
- OS grid: NY175221
- Topo map: OS Landranger 89, 90, Explorer OL4

Listed summits of Whiteside (Lake District)
| Name | Grid ref | Height | Status |
|---|---|---|---|
| Whiteside ("Wainwright" top) | NY170219 | 707 m (2,320 ft) | Nuttall |

Whiteside is a fell in the north-western area of the English Lake District. It stands at the western end of the Grisedale Pike- Hopegill Head ridge overlooking Crummock Water.

== Topography ==
The North Western Fells occupy the area between the rivers Derwent and Cocker, a broadly oval swathe of hilly country, elongated on a north-south axis. Two roads cross from east to west, dividing the fells into three convenient groups. The central sector, rising between Whinlatter Pass and Newlands Pass, includes Whiteside.

The high ground in this group of fells is formed by a series of ridges in the form of the letter 'H' lying on one side. The northern ridge is formed by Whiteside, Hopegill Head and Grisedale Pike, while the Grasmoor to Causey Pike ridge runs parallel to the south. The bridge between the two is the pass of Coledale Hause. This stands at the head of two valleys, Coledale descending eastward and Gasgale Gill flowing west.

Whiteside forms a shallow crescent, concave to the south and fringed on that face by the great wall of Gasgale Crags. These drop 500 feet (150 m) direct from the summit ridge into the valley below. The eastern end of the fell connects to Hopegill Head without any great loss of height, while the western end of the ridge descends steeply over Whiteside End to the Vale of Lorton. The subsidiary top of Whin Ben 1,355 feet (413 m) stands at the south west corner, overlooking the point where Gasgale Gill debouches into the fields of Lanthwaite.

The northern slopes are much more extensive with two long ridges being thrown out from the main mass of the fell. The shorter is Penn, while further to the east is Dodd 1,489 feet (454 m). The valley of Hopegill separates Dodd from Ladyside Pike and the northern ridge of Hopegill Head.

== Geology ==
The southern crags expose rock of the Kirkstile Formation, comprising laminated mudstone and siltstone. To the north is the Loweswater Formation of greywacke sandstone. In the vicinity of Dodd the Hopebeck Formation is exposed, mudstone and siltstone with greywacke sandstone turbidities. There is also a minor intrusion of lamprophyre in this area.

There are two mining trial workings on the western slopes of Whiteside. On the northern side of Gasgale Gill there is a short level, perhaps aimed at picking up the course of the Force Crag vein from Coledale (see Force Crag mine). Beneath Whiteside End is a small working where some galena was extracted.

== Summits ==
Whiteside has three summits: the "Wainwright" top stands at the Crummock Water end of the ridge and has a height of 707 metres (2,320 ft). Wainwright accepted that it was not the highest point, but chose it as the summit in his Pictorial Guide to the Lakeland Fells. This western top does have sufficient prominence to be classified as a Nuttall. Wainwright described the true summit as the Whiteside East top, this being 400 metres (440 yd) further along the ridge to Hopegill Head and substantially higher at 719 metres (2,359 ft). The Nuttalls describe the true summit as "Whiteside East Top" and the lower "Wainwright" summit as "Whiteside".

The third top lies further to the east, a similar distance beyond the true summit. This has a height of 703 metres (2,306 ft) and is referred to in some guidebooks as Gasgill Crags.

There is a fine vista of West Cumberland, the Solway Firth and the hills of Scotland. Closer at hand the view of the fells is interrupted by Grasmoor and Crag Hill to the south and Hopegill Head to the east, although isolated groups of fells appear in the gaps. Crummock Water and Loweswater are brought into view by descending a little to the west. The ridge walk between Whiteside and Hopegill Head is ranked as one of the best in the district with Alfred Wainwright describing it as “an exhilarating high level traverse”; there are excellent views down into Gasgale Gill on the southern side.

== Ascents ==
The main route of ascent is from Lanthwaite Green at the north end of Crummock Water ascending heathery slopes over the minor top of Whin Ben before reaching the summit. Whiteside can also be climbed from the north, using either the Dodd or Penn ridges.
