= North Western Fells =

Region of the Cumbrian Mountains

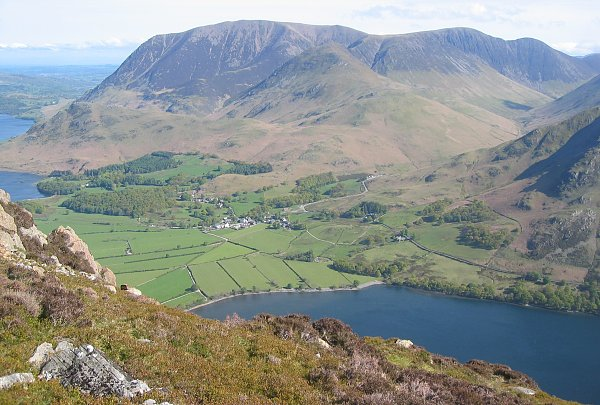
Grasmoor (left) and its satellites above Crummock Water

The North Western Fells are a part of the Cumbrian Mountains in the Lake District of England. Including such favourites as Catbells and Grisedale Pike, they occupy an oval area beneath the Buttermere and Borrowdale valley systems. The North Western Fells are characterised by soaring east-west ridges and an absence of mountain tarns.

== Partition of the Lakeland Fells ==
The Lake District is a National Park in the north west of the country which, in addition to its lakes, contains a complex range of hills. These are known locally as fells and range from low hills to the highest ground in England. Hundreds of tops exist and many writers have attempted to draw up definitive lists. In doing so the compilers frequently divide the range into smaller areas to aid their description.

The most influential of all such authors was Alfred Wainwright whose Pictorial Guide to the Lakeland Fells series has sold in excess of 2 million copies, being in print continuously since the first volume was published in 1952. Wainwright divided the fells into seven geographical areas, each surrounded by valleys and low passes. While any such division must be arbitrary – and later writers have deviated to a greater or lesser extent from this blueprint – Wainwright's sevenfold division remains the best known partitioning of the fells into 'sub ranges', each with its own characteristics. The North Western Fells are one of these divisions, covered by volume 6 of Wainwright's work.

== Boundaries ==
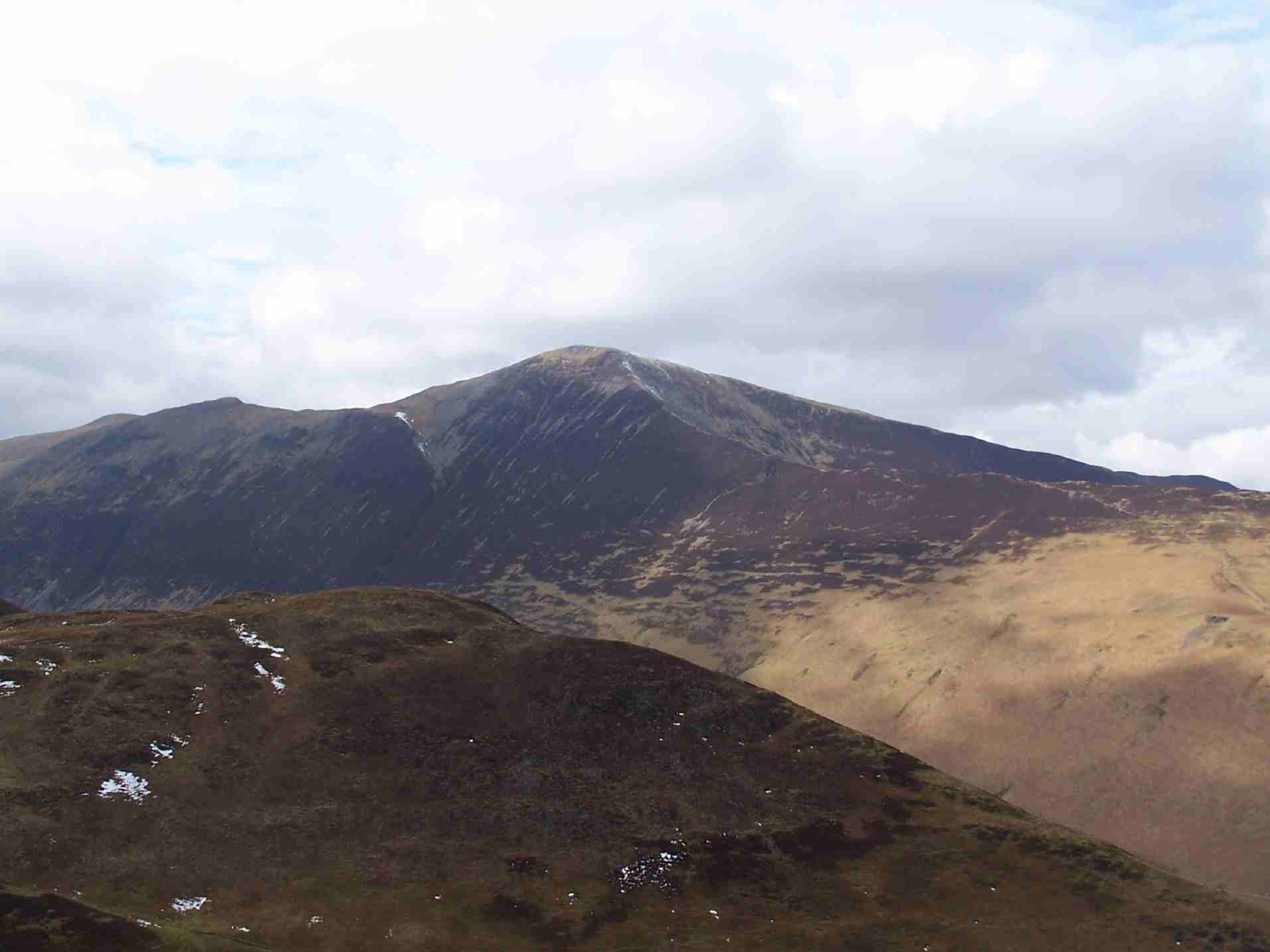
Grisedale Pike from Barrow

The North Western Fells form a self-contained unit, its borders being well defined. The only link with other high ground is at the summit of Honister Pass in the extreme south. Across the depression are Fleetwith Pike and the Western Fells. The streams falling east and west from Honister turn gradually northward and flow along roughly parallel courses for around 12 miles (19 km). On the west is the River Cocker and its headwaters, passing through the lakes of Buttermere and Crummock Water. The eastern boundary is formed by the Derwent system, including Derwent Water and Bassenthwaite Lake. The Derwent ultimately turns westward and is joined by the Cocker at the town of Cockermouth, completing the circuit.

== Topography ==
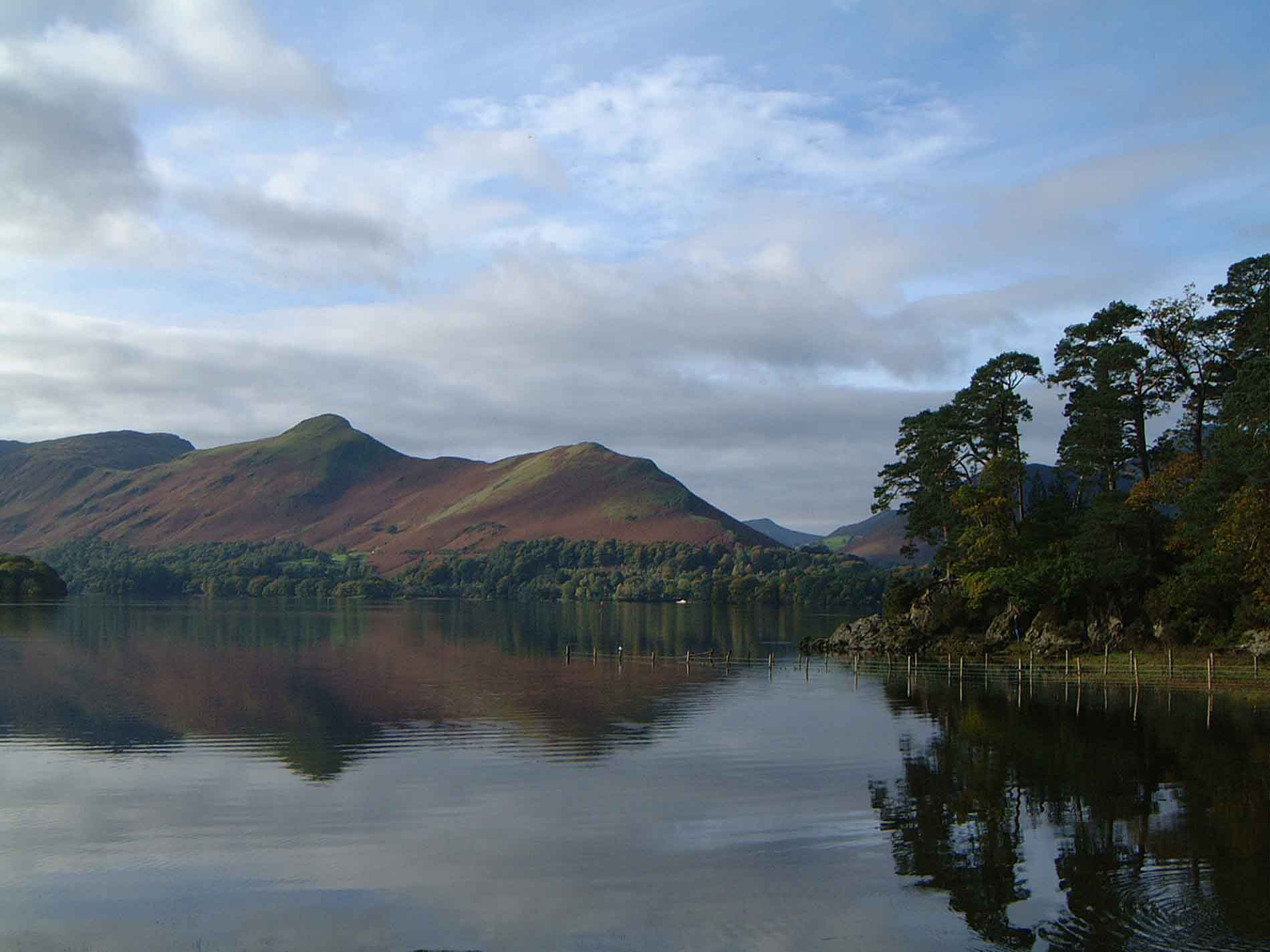
Catbells across Derwent Water

Unusually for areas of high fell, the North Western Fells are traversed by two roads. Both cross east to west, connecting the bordering valleys. Newlands Pass runs from Braithwaite village to Buttermere while Whinlatter Pass takes a more northerly route from Braithwaite to High Lorton. These passes divide the North Western Fells into three sectors.

The most southerly sector consists of a ridge running broadly north east to south west. Beginning with the family favourite of Catbells, the high ground continues over Maiden Moor, High Spy, Dale Head, Hindscarth and Robinson. An outlier of High Spy in the 'Jaws of Borrowdale', Castle Crag is listed as a separate fell by Wainwright.

The central area is based around two parallel east-west ridges. The southerly line begins above Derwent Water with the knobbly outline of Causey Pike and then marches west over Scar Crags, Sail, Eel Crag, Wandope and finally Grasmoor. This is the highest of the North Western Fells at 2,795 feet (852 m), standing above a dramatic fall to Crummock Water. Outliers to the south of this ridge are Ard Crags, Knott Rigg, Whiteless Pike and Rannerdale Knotts, while Barrow and Outerside stand to the north. The parallel northern ridge includes Grisedale Pike, visible as a fine triangular pyramid from Keswick, Hopegill Head and Whiteside.

The fells to the north of Whinlatter are generally lower and less rugged. They include Whinlatter, Graystones, Broom Fell, Lord's Seat, Barf (with its famous 'Bishop'), Sale Fell and Ling Fell.

== Access for walkers ==
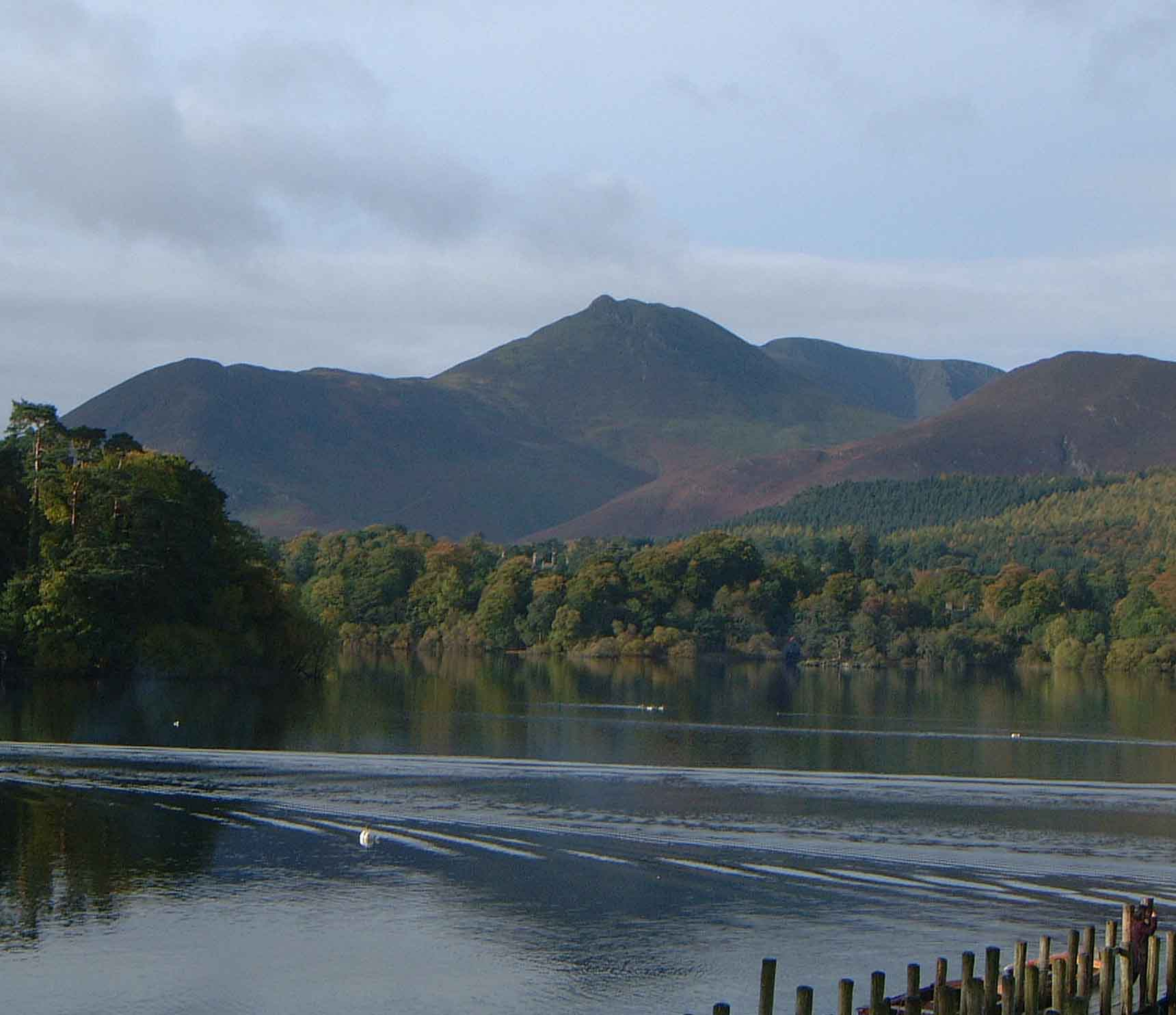
Causey Pike from Derwentwater

The North Western Fells are entirely surrounded by roads, and additionally traversed by two more. Keswick and Buttermere provide good bases to the north and west while the summits of Honister, Newlands and Whinlatter passes all provide parking. The most popular climb in the area is Cat Bells via Hause End, a walk which can be made from Keswick via the Derwentwater launches.

== See also ==
- Eastern Fells
- Far Eastern Fells
- Central Fells
- Southern Fells
- Northern Fells
- Western Fells
