= Grasmoor =

Mountain in the English Lake District, Cumbria, England

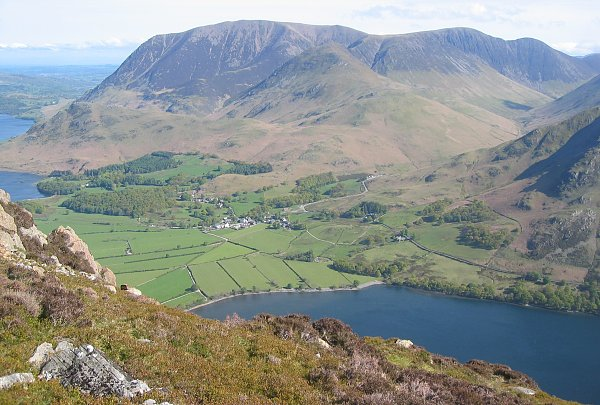
- The huge bulk of Grasmoor above the Crummock Water valley

Highest point
- Elevation: 852 m (2,795 ft)
- Prominence: 519 m (1,703 ft)
- Parent peak: Scafell Pike
- Listing: Marilyn, Wainwright, Hewitt, Nuttall
- Coordinates: 54°34′16″N 3°16′45″W

Geography
- Location within the Lake District Location within the former Allerdale Borough
- Location: Cumbria, England
- Parent range: Lake District, North Western Fells
- OS grid: NY174203
- Topo map: OS Landranger 89, 90, Explorer OL4

Grasmoor is a mountain in the north-western part of the Lake District, northern England. It is the highest peak in a group of hills between the villages of Lorton, Braithwaite and Buttermere, and overlooks Crummock Water.

Grasmoor is distinguished by its steep western flank, dropping dramatically to Crummock Water. This face is however not suitable for rock climbers as there is little clean rock, although Alfred Wainwright describes a challenging route up the face in his Pictorial Guides to the Lakeland Fells. To the east the fell is linked to others by Crag Hill and Coledale Hause. Grasmoor is also home to the most extensive scree slopes in the North Western Fells.

== Name ==
Grasmoor takes its name from the Old Norse element grise, meaning wild boar. This element appears in other Lake District place names, including Grisedale Pike and Grizedale Forest.

== Topography ==
The North-Western Fells occupy the area between the rivers Derwent and Cocker, a broadly oval swathe of hilly country, elongated on a north–south axis. Two roads cross from east to west, dividing the fells into three convenient groups. The central sector, rising between Whinlatter Pass and Newlands Pass, includes Grasmoor.

The highest ground in the North-Western Fells is an east–west ridge in this central sector, beginning with Grasmoor above Crummock Water and then gradually descending eastwards over Crag Hill, Sail, Scar Crags and Causey Pike. Grasmoor has the greatest elevation, although Crag Hill stands at the hub of the range.

From the valley floor near Little Town at the eastern end, the ridge requires four miles (6 km) of gradual ascent to attain the summit of Grasmoor. Starting at the shores of Crummock Water in the west, the same is achieved by a single slope of scree in less than a quarter of the distance. Grasmoor is Lakeland's terminal height par excellence.

The summit is at the west end of a broad, gently domed promenade of moss and short grass, with a narrowing in the middle where the deep bowl of Dove Crags bites into the northern face. To the east of this plateau are broad smooth slopes descending to a wide unnamed col at 2,368 ft (722 m). This connects onward to Crag Hill. At the western end the summit area narrows, culminating at the subsidiary top of Grasmoor End (2,445 ft / 745 m) which crowns the western face. Great fans of scree descend to the lakeside road below. Grasmoor has one minor ridge which descends south-westward over Lad Hows (1,397 ft / 426 m) before a steeper fall to the valley floor.

To the south of Grasmoor is the valley of Rannerdale, which flows to Crummock Water between Lad Hows and the neighbouring Wandope. This drainage is supplemented by Cinderdale Beck, separating Lad Hows from the main body of the fell. The northern flank of the ridge stands above Liza Beck, in the valley of Gasgale Gill. This stream also makes due west for Crummock Water, but is diverted northward by the low top of Lanthwaite Hill to join the Cocker after its exit from the lake. An area of lowland to the north-west is thus annexed to Grasmoor from the natural territory of Whiteside.

== Geology ==
The surface rocks of Grasmoor are composed primarily of the Ordovician Kirkstile Formation. These are laminated mudstone and siltstone, typical of the Skiddaw range. There is no history of mining beneath the slopes of Grasmoor. The bowl of Dove Crags is one of the largest glacial combs or cirques in the Lake District, yet has no tarn, but dry hollows noted as curious by Alfred Wainwright. This cavity has originated or been enlarged by a very large landslip (rock slope failure)which over at least the last 20,000 years has been displacing the Liza Beck northwards, narrowing Gasgale Gill valley and provoking the unusually extensive scree slopes of Whiteside.

== Summit ==
The top of the fell lies toward the western end of the summit plateau, marked by a huge sprawling cairn. There are many smaller cairns and the top is characterised by sheep-mown grass. The view is extensive although robbed of some foreground by the extent of the summit. All of the major Lakeland ranges are in sight with the exception of the Far Eastern Fells, with High Stile above Crummock Water perhaps the highpoint. This is best seen from the western end of the plateau.

== Ascents ==
The obvious way is direct up the screes from Lanthwaite on the Crummock Water road, picking through the rock scenery above to appear on Grasmoor End from the north west. This involves 2,000 ft (600 m) of ascent in about one-half mile (one kilometre). From the same starting point a detour along Liza Beck/ Gasgale Gill can be used to give access to the northern slopes. A way can then be found almost direct to the summit around the rim of Dove Crags. From Rannerdale a choice of routes arises, either climbing the Lad Hows ridge or following Red Gill a little to the west. Finally Coledale Hause can be used to gain the main ridge between Crag Hill and Grasmoor. This can be reached from Lanthwaite or as the first objective of a longer march from Braithwaite in the east. Coledale Hause connects to Hopegill Head and the fells to the north, providing further indirect possibilities.

== Protection ==
Grasmoor is within Buttermere Fells Site of Special Scientific Interest which is also within Lake District National Park. The land surface of Grasmoor mountain is owned by the National Trust.
