= Buttermere and Ennerdale =

National Trust property in the Lake District, England

Coordinates: 54.540°N 3.334°W

Buttermere and Ennerdale is a National Trust property located in the Lake District of Cumbria, England.

The property comprises an area of 8,866 acres (35.88 km^{2}) of fell and common land, including the lakes of Buttermere, Crummock Water and Loweswater, seven farms and woodland, as well as access to Ennerdale Water.
