= Knott Rigg =

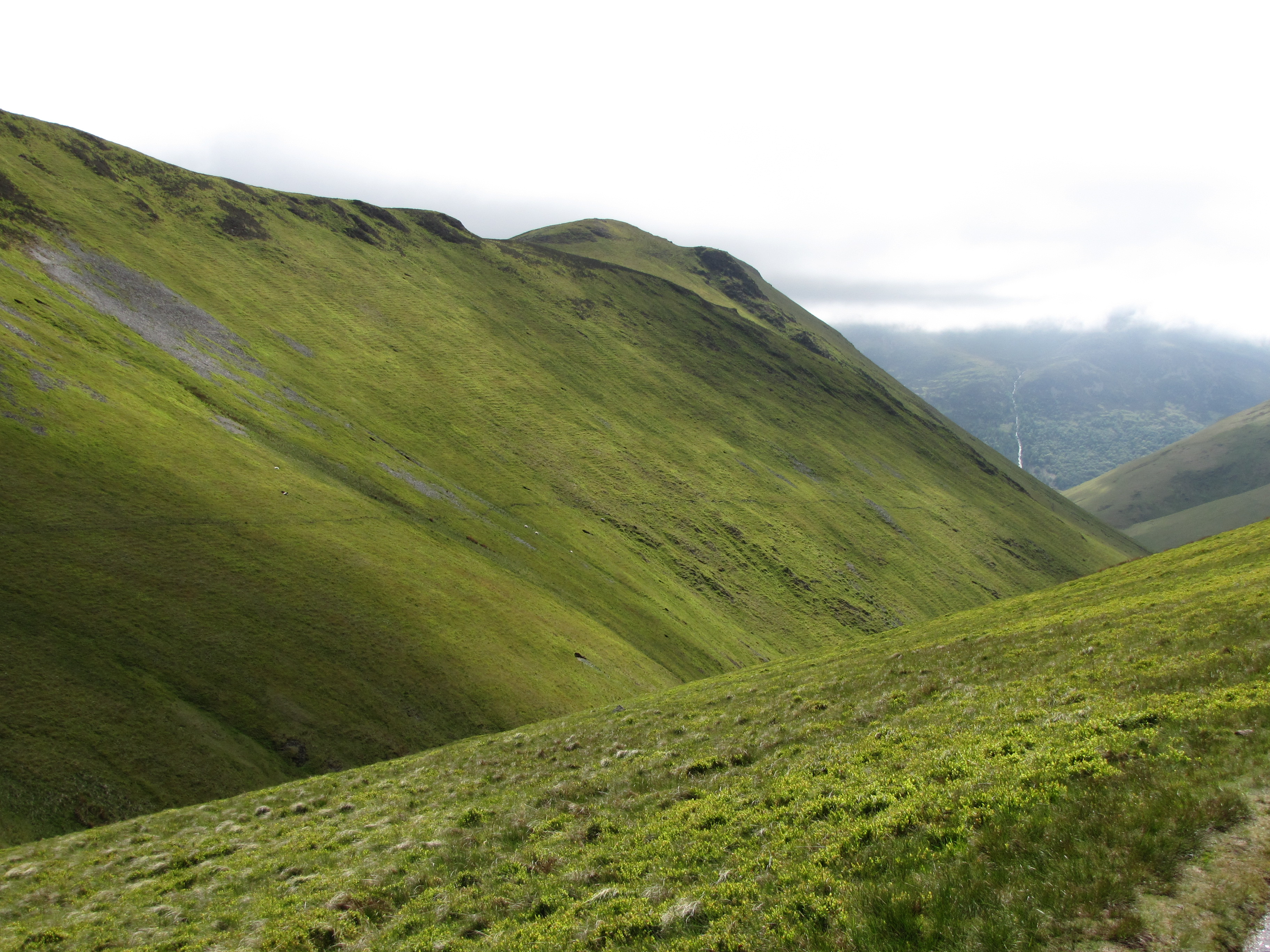
- Viewed from near the source of Rigg Beck.

Highest point
- Elevation: 556 m (1,824 ft)
- Prominence: 61 m (200 ft)
- Parent peak: Ard Crags
- Listing: Wainwright
- Coordinates: 54°33′29″N 3°14′31″W

Geography
- Location within the Lake District
- Location: Cumbria, England
- Parent range: Lake District, North Western Fells
- OS grid: NY197188
- Topo map: OS Landranger 89, 90 OS Explorer 4

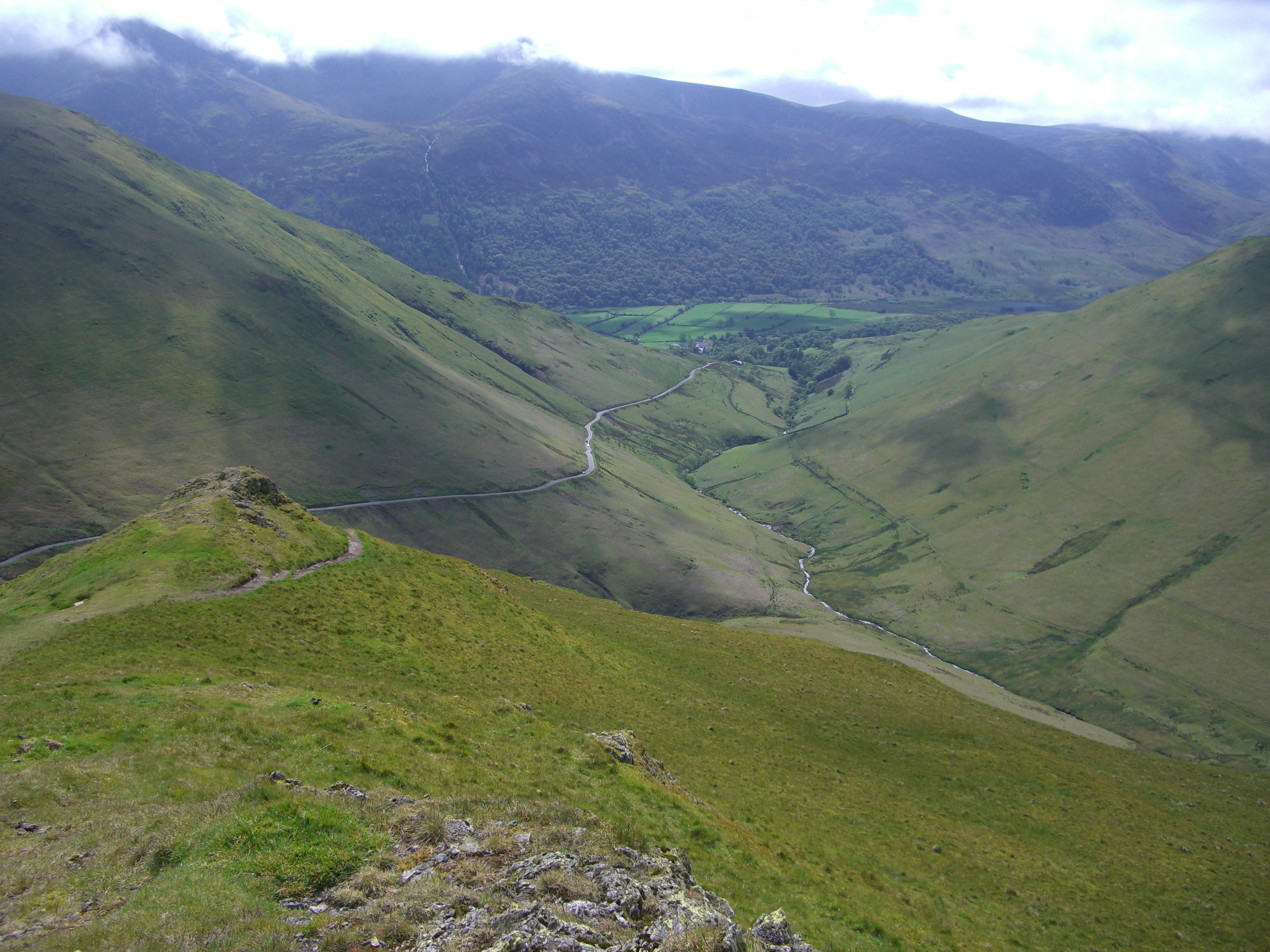
Looking south from the summit ridge towards the Buttermere valley.

Knott Rigg is a fell at the head of the Newlands Valley in the English Lake District. It is situated some 8 1/2 kilometres (5 1/4 mi) south west of Keswick and has a modest height of 556 metres (1,824 feet). Its name is derived from the Old English language and means “hill on a knobbly ridge”. Despite its modest height, the fell is listed on a number of hill lists, including the Birketts and TuMPs, and also has its own chapter in Alfred Wainwright’s Pictorial Guide to the Lakeland Fells.

== Topography ==
Knott Rigg is located on a four-kilometre (2 1/2-mile) long ridge, which springs from Rigg Beck in the Newlands valley midway along its length and runs south westerly to conclude at Newlands Hause. The ridge also contains the adjoining fell of Ard Crags which stands 1 1/2 kilometres (1 mile) north east of Knott Rigg; both fells are usually climbed in combination with each other. Knott Rigg is steep sided, with the western flank falling away to the valley of Sail Beck, while the eastern side descends to the minor road between Keswick and Buttermere in the Newlands valley. The fell is best viewed from Newlands Hause, where it is seen as a sharp conical peak (although the highest point is not in view), or from Buttermere, from where a complete picture of the fell is seen (although it is rather distant).

== Geology ==
The Ard Crags ridge is an example of the Buttermere Formation, an olistostrome of disrupted, sheared and folded mudstone, siltstone and sandstone. There are minor intrusions of basalt on Knott Rigg.

== Ascents ==
The easiest ascent of Knott Rigg is started from the car park at Newlands Hause (grid reference NY192176). This gives the advantage of starting at a height of 333 metres (1,093 ft), giving an easy vertical ascent of just over 200 metres (660 ft). An alternative start can be made from further down the Newlands valley, either at Keskadale Farm or Rigg Beck. The latter route goes over Ard Crags first before continuing to Knott Rigg.

== Summit ==
The view from the summit is restricted by the surrounding higher hills of the Coledale and Buttermere Fells. However, there is a view to the east in the arc between Sail and Robinson, which reveals views of the Skiddaw and Helvellyn ranges.
