= Causey Pike Fault =

Major fault zone in the English Lake District

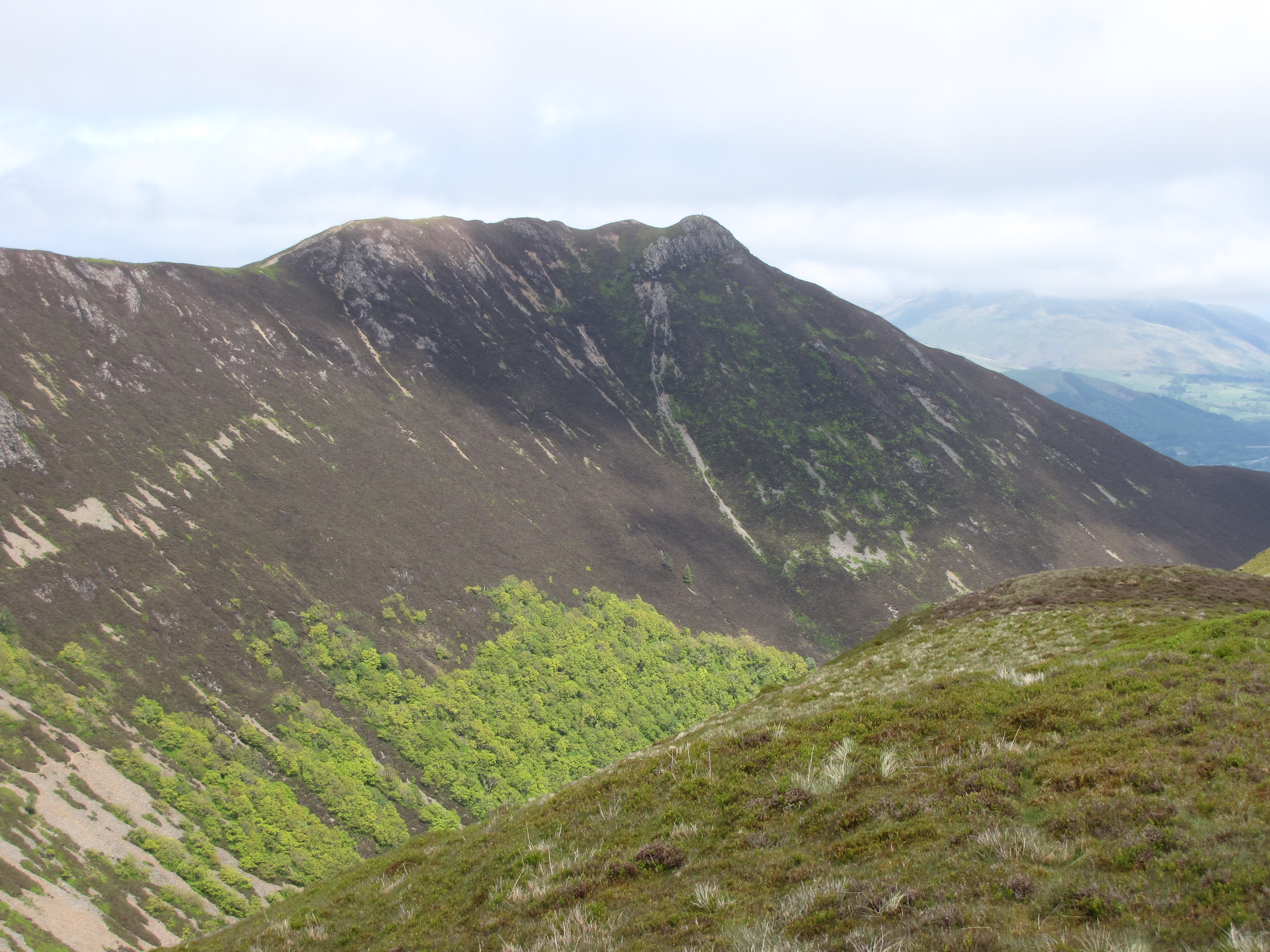
The Causey Pike Fault visible at the base of the crags on Causey Pike and across the flank of Scar Crags, viewed from Ard Crags

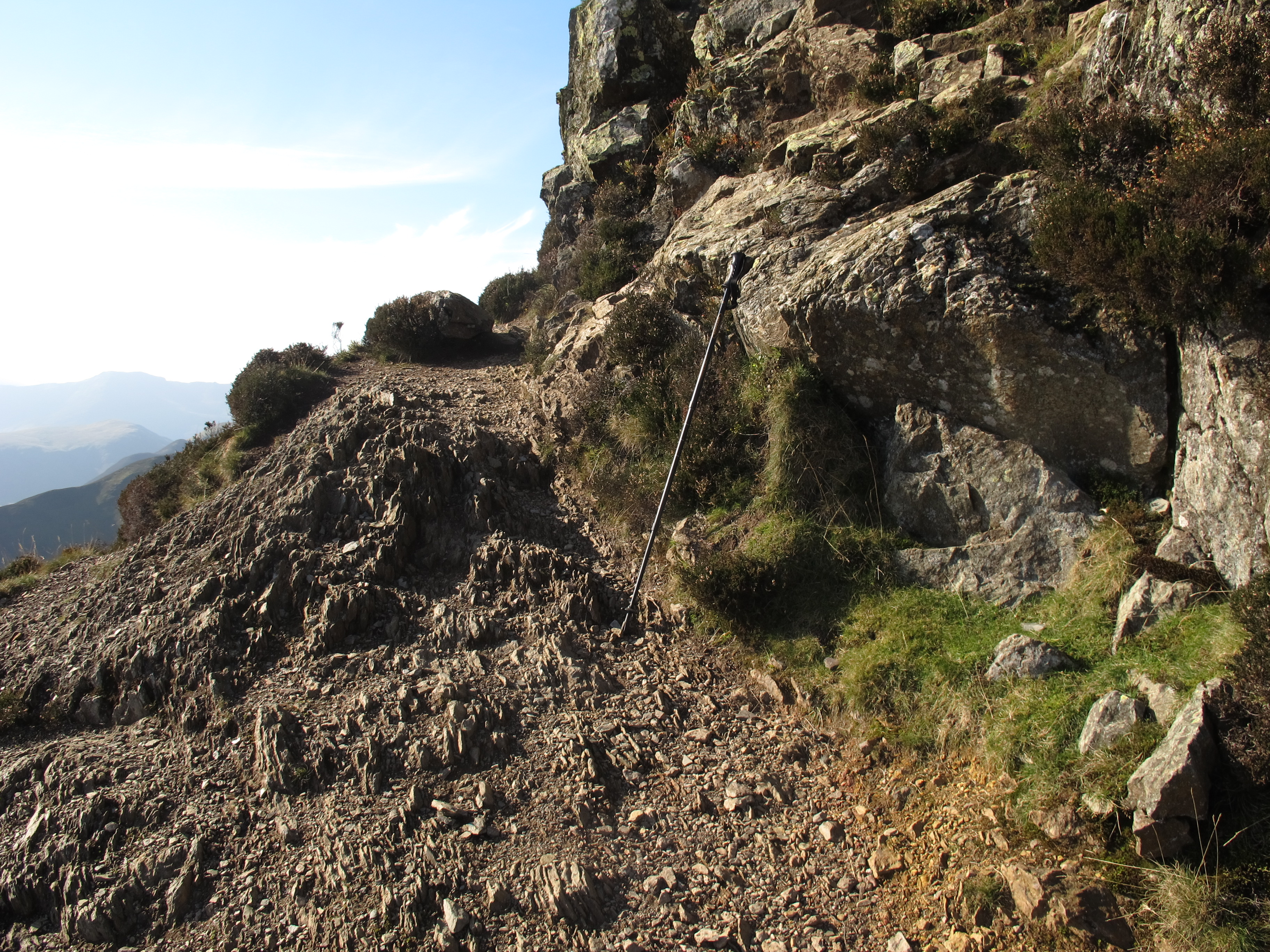
Rocks of the Crummock Water Aureole, thrust over a sandstone olistolith of the Buttermere Formation, just below the top of Causey Pike

The Causey Pike Fault or Causey Pike Thrust is a major WSW-ENE trending fault within the Lower Paleozoic rocks of the English Lake District. It is named for Causey Pike, where the fault was first recognised.

== Extent ==
The Causey Pike Fault has been recognised across the entire outcrop of the Lake District inlier, extending about 35 km from near Ennerdale Bridge in the west, to near Troutbeck in the east. A possible continuation of the fault to the east has been recognised in the Cross Fell inlier, where it also juxtaposes two differing parts of the Skiddaw Group.

== Recognition ==
It juxtaposes two successions dominated by mudrocks that are of similar age. To the north of the fault, the Ordovician Skiddaw Group is represented by the Kirk Stile Formation, to the south by the Buttermere Formation, both of Arenig age. The younger sequence of volcanic rocks overlying the Skiddaw Group also differs, with the Eycott Volcanic Group to the north and the Borrowdale Volcanic Group to the south. The fault is described as a thrust near Causey Pike, where metasomatised rocks of the Crummock Water Aureole are emplaced over sandstone olistoliths of the Buttermere Formation, but the overall displacement on this structure is oblique, with a significant component of sinistral (left lateral) strike-slip motion.

== Age of movement ==
The differences in stratigraphy and interpreted depositional environment across the fault may indicate that the fault was originally a normal fault, active during deposition of the Skiddaw Group. The oblique slip movement on the fault occurred during the Acadian Orogeny, at least in part postdating the contact metamorphism that caused the development of the Crummock Water Aureole (dated to about 401 Ma - Emsian), which itself postdates the formation of the regional cleavage seen within the Skiddaw Group.
