= Whinlatter Pass =

Mountain pass in the Lake District, Cumbria, England

Coordinates: 54.6096°N 3.2483°W

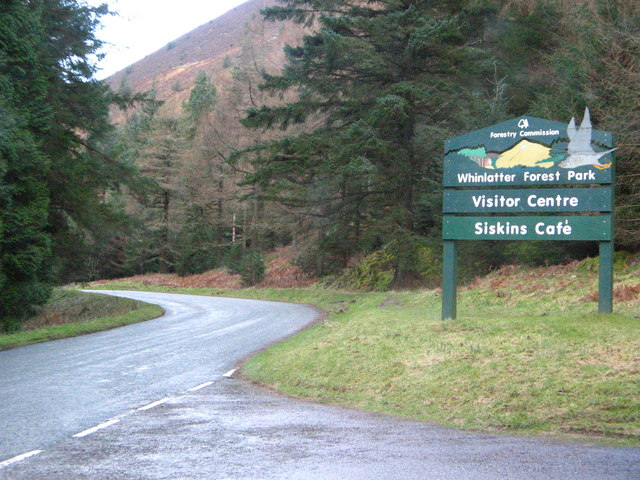
The summit of the Whinlatter Pass and the entrance to the Whinlatter Forest Park.

The Whinlatter Pass is a mountain pass in the Lake District in Cumbria, England. It is located on the B5292 road linking Braithwaite, to the west of Keswick, with High Lorton to the south of Cockermouth.

To the north the pass is flanked by Whinlatter fell, while to the south the Whiteside, Hopegill Head and Grisedale Pike fells borders the pass. From the top of the pass, paths climb Whinlatter and Grisedale Pike. There is also a Forestry Commission tourist centre there.

The Whinlatter Pass is one of three passes that link the tourist area around Keswick, including Derwent Water and Borrowdale, with the valley of the River Cocker, including the lakes of Buttermere, Crummock Water and Loweswater. From north to south these passes are the Whinlatter Pass, the Newlands Pass, and the Honister Pass. The Whinlatter Pass can be icy in winter, but it is a less severe route than the other two passes.

The Pass was used for the first King of the Mountains climb on the second stage of the 2016 Tour of Britain cycle race.

Whinlatter Forest is England’s only true mountain forest and sits atop the Whinlatter Pass and is celebrated for its panoramic views, extensive waymarked walking trails, and the longest purpose-built mountain bike routes in the area.

== See also ==
- List of hill passes of the Lake District
