= Newlands Pass =

Mountain pass in the Lake District, Cumbria, England

Coordinates: 54.547326°N 3.249464°W

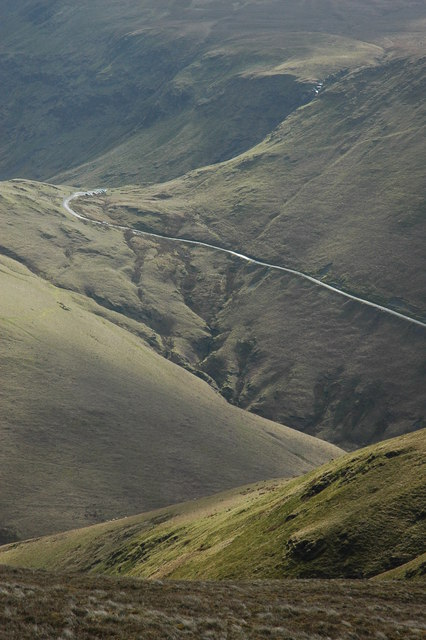
Newlands Pass

The Newlands Pass, also known as Newlands Hause, is a mountain pass in the Lake District in Cumbria, England. It is located on an unclassified road linking the Newlands Valley, to the west of Keswick and Derwent Water, with the village of Buttermere. The highest point on the pass is at an altitude of 1,093 feet (333 m), and it has gradients of 1 in 4 on both sides.

The Newlands Pass is one of three passes that link the tourist area around Keswick, including Derwent Water and Borrowdale, with the valley of the River Cocker, including the lakes of Buttermere, Crummock Water and Loweswater. From north to south these passes are the Whinlatter Pass, the Newlands Pass, and the Honister Pass.

The Moss Force Waterfall falls down the southern side of Newlands Pass and can easily be reached from the top of the pass.

== See also ==
- List of hill passes of the Lake District
