= Buttermere =

Lake in Cumbria, England

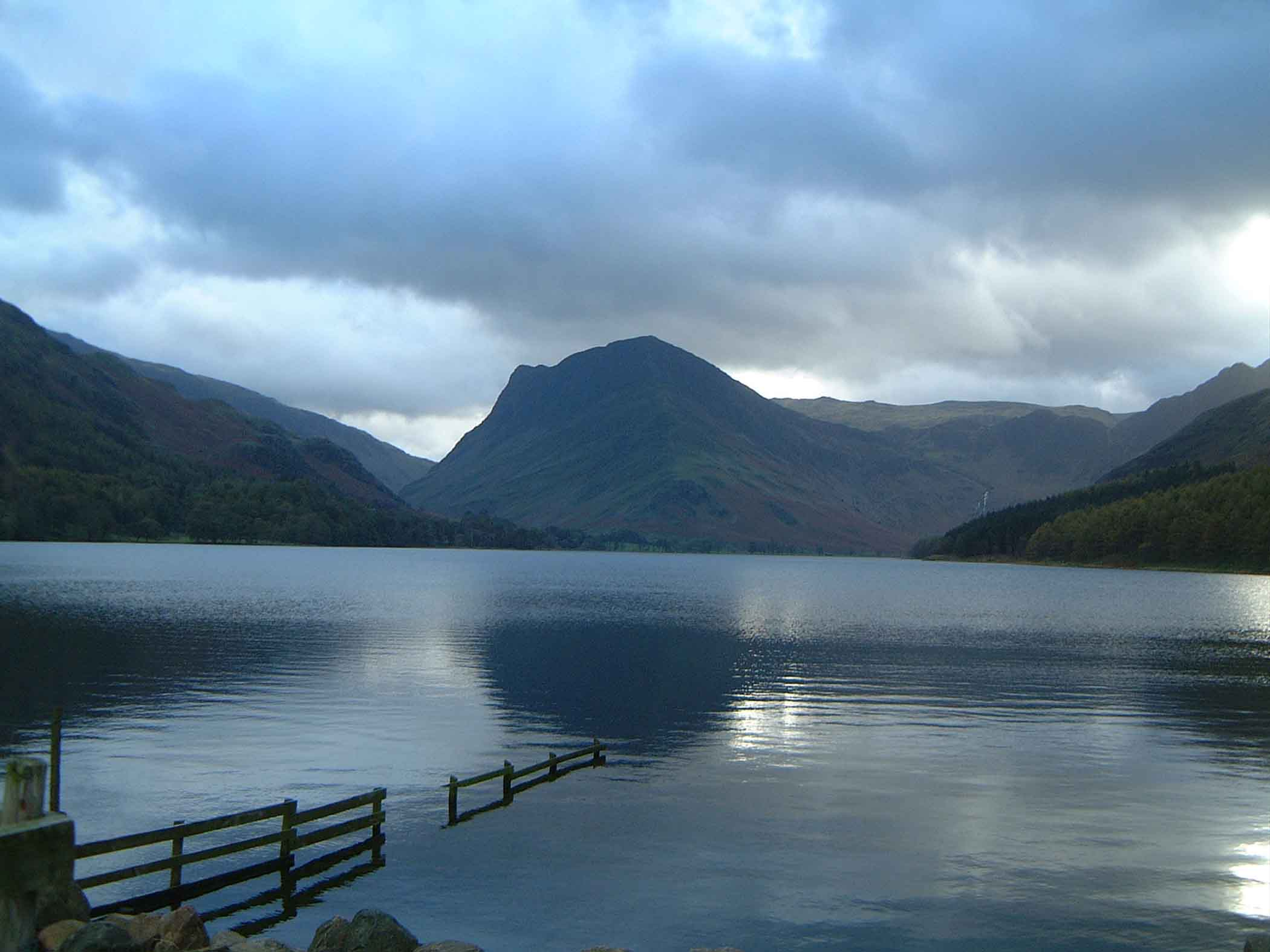
- View of lake with Fleetwith Pike in the background

- Location in the Lake District National Park Location in Allerdale, Cumbria

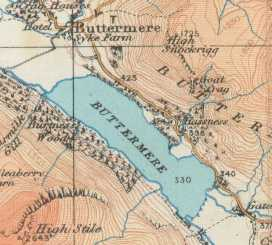
- Map (1925)
- Location: Lake District
- Coordinates: 54°32′N 3°16′W
- Lake type: Ribbon
- Primary inflows: Gatesgarthdale Beck
- Primary outflows: Buttermere Dubs
- Basin countries: United Kingdom
- Max. length: 2 km (2,200 yd)
- Max. width: 0.57 km (620 yd)
- Surface area: 0.93 km^{2} (0.36 sq mi)
- Max. depth: 75 ft (23 m; 12.5 fathoms)
- Shore length^{1}: 5.35 km (3 mi 571 yd)
- Surface elevation: 329 ft (100 m)
- Islands: 0
- ^{1} Shore length is not a well-defined measure.

Buttermere is a lake in the Lake District in North West England. It has an area of 0.9 square kilometres (0.35 sq mi), a length of approximately 2 kilometres (1.2 mi), a maximum width of 0.54 kilometres (0.34 mi), a maximum depth of 28.6 metres (94 ft), and a surface elevation of 100.3 metres (329 ft) above sea level. Its primary outflow is Buttermere Dubs, a short stream which connects the lake to Crummock Water. From Crummock Water the River Cocker flows to Cockermouth, where it joins the River Derwent and finally enters the Irish Sea at Workington. The lake is in the unitary authority of Cumberland, and the ceremonial county of Cumbria.

== Geography ==
The lake is 1 1/4 miles (2 km) long by 1/4 mile (400 m) wide, and is 75 feet (23 m; 12.5 fathoms) deep. It has an elevation above sea level of 329 feet (100 m). It is situated towards the head of the valley of the River Cocker and is surrounded by fells, notably the High Stile range to the south west, Robinson to the north-east, Fleetwith Pike and Haystacks to the south-east and Grasmoor to the north-west.

The village of Buttermere stands at the north-western end of the lake, and beyond this is Crummock Water. There is a path around the lake which is about 4 1/2 miles (7 km) long, and at one point runs through a rock tunnel beneath the locality of Hassness. Access is by road, from Cockermouth in the north-west; from Borrowdale via the Honister Pass; or from Braithwaite and the Newlands Valley via Newlands Hause.

The lake is owned by the National Trust, forming part of its Buttermere and Ennerdale property.

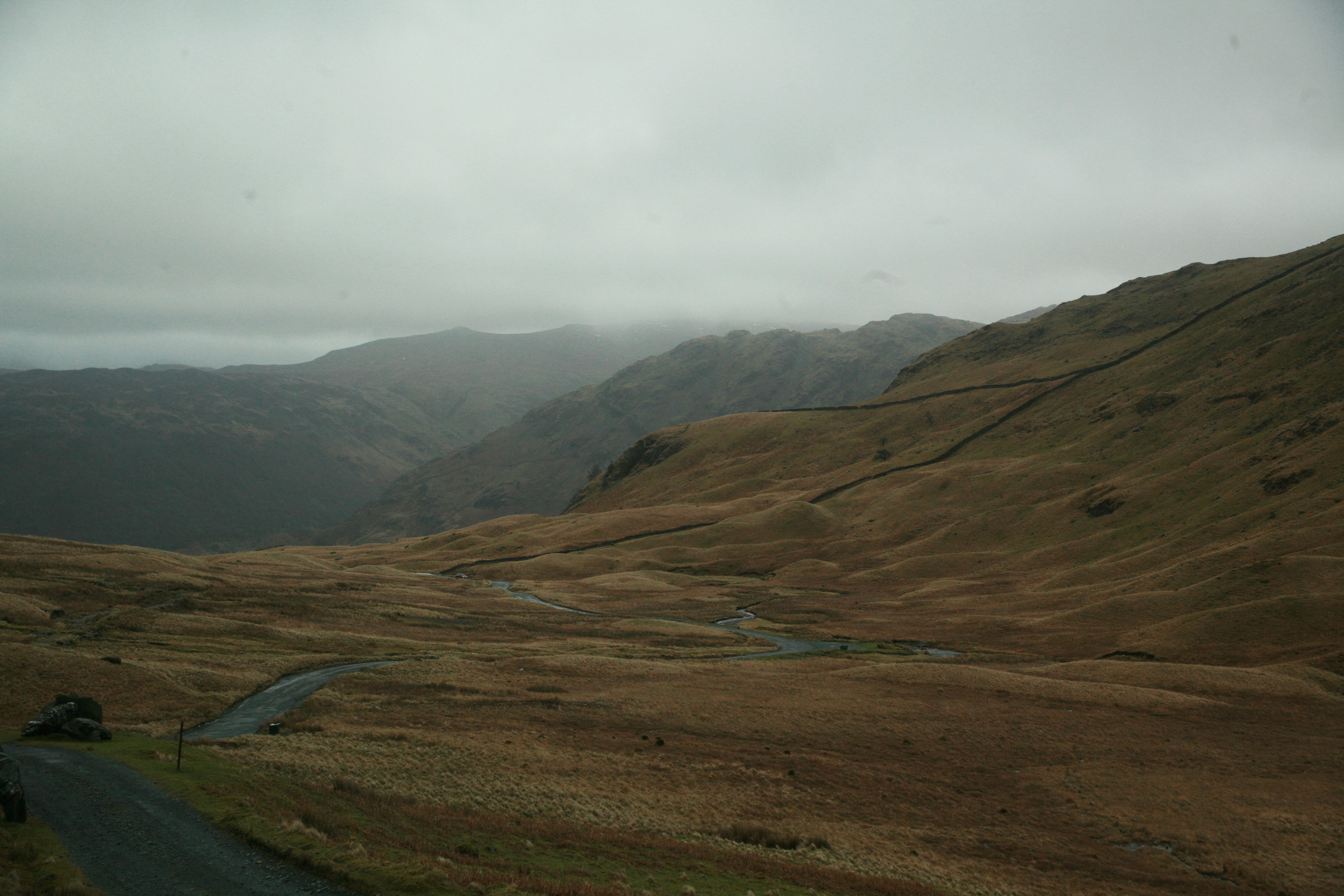
Part of the trail that goes round Buttermere

== Toponymy ==
The name Buttermere literally means "butter lake", from Old English butere and mere. The word butere was often used in the names of places with rich pastures that produced good butter, and according to Diana Whaley, the name Buttermere conveys "the fertile nature of the flat alluvial land at both ends of the lake". An alternative theory, dismissed by Whaley, traces the name to an earl named Boethar, who supposedly led the Anglo-Scandinavian resistance against the Normans in the 11th century.

== Legend and literature ==
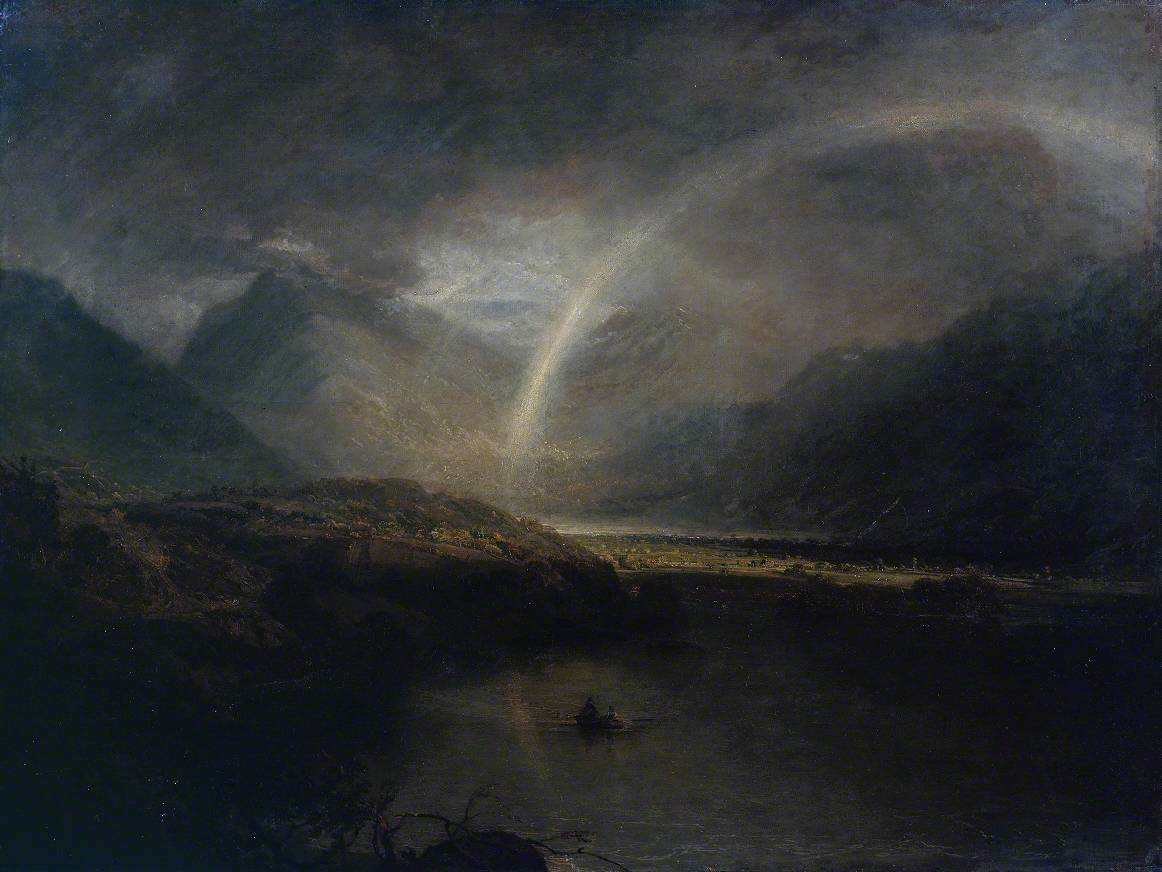
Buttermere Lake by J.M.W. Turner, 1798

From his hidden stronghold at Buttermere, it is said that Earl Boethar conducted a campaign of running resistance against the Norman invaders, from the time of William the Conqueror's Harrying of the North in 1069 right up until the early 12th century. In 1072 King William set up a garrison at Carlisle, but the isolated garrison needed constant reinforcement and supplies. It is claimed that the Cumbrians fought a guerrilla war against the Normans for almost half a century, attacking supply wagons, ambushing patrols and inflicting great losses upon them in terms of money, material and men.

The extent to which Earl Boethar is a semi-mythological figure is unclear. He is apparently mentioned in 12th-century Norman documents, but much of his story appears to be based on local legend and archaeology, later enhanced by Nicholas Size's popular dramatised history (see below).

Earl Boethar's campaign and a final battle at Rannerdale between the Normans and the Anglo-Scandinavian Cumbrians led by the Jarl is the subject of a dramatised history by Nicholas Size, called The Secret Valley: The Real Romance of Unconquered Lakeland, published in 1930.

Rosemary Sutcliff's YA novel Shield Ring, published in 1956, imagines the lives of Earl Boethar and his band of Cumbrian rebels, and their last stand against the forces of a Norman army under the command of Ranulf le Meschin, Lord of Carlisle and later Earl of Chester, nearly 50 years after the Norman Conquest of England in 1066. It was clearly inspired by Nicholas Size's history, which it closely follows.

Mary Robinson (1778–1837), known as the "Maid of Buttermere" and the subject of Melvyn Bragg's novel of that name, was the daughter of the landlord of the Fish Inn in Buttermere village.
