= Crummock Water =

Lake in Cumbria, England

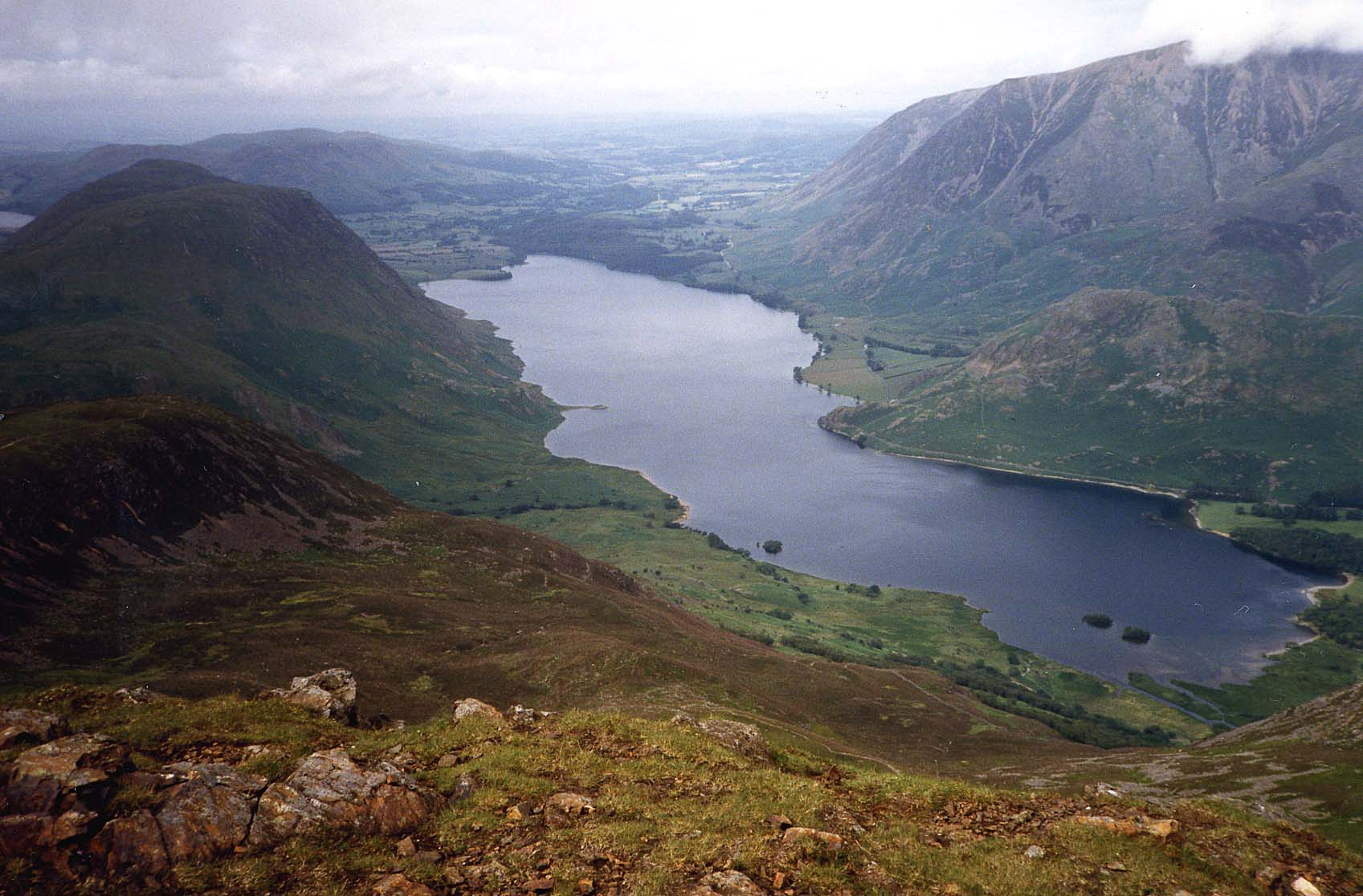
- Crummock Water from Red Pike

- Location in the Lake District National Park Location in Allerdale, Cumbria

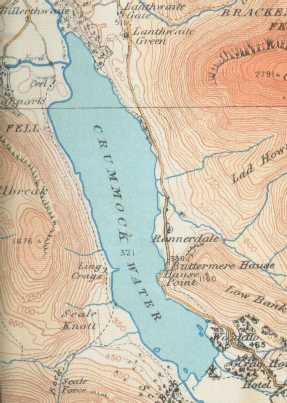
- map (1925)
- Location: Lake District, Cumbria
- Coordinates: 54°33′N 3°18′W
- Type: Ribbon
- Primary inflows: Buttermere Dubs
- Primary outflows: River Cocker
- Basin countries: United Kingdom
- Max. length: 2.5 mi (4.0 km)
- Max. width: 0.6 mi (0.97 km)
- Surface area: 2.57 km^{2} (0.99 sq mi)
- Max. depth: 140 ft (43 m)
- Shore length^{1}: 6.26 mi (10.07 km)
- Surface elevation: 96 m (315 ft)
- Islands: 6
- ^{1} Shore length is not a well-defined measure.

Crummock Water is a lake in the Lake District in North West England. It is 2.5 miles (4.0 km) long, 0.6 miles (0.97 km) wide, 140 feet (43 m) deep, and has an area of 2.5 square kilometres (0.97 sq mi). The lake's primary inflow is Buttermere Dubs, itself the outflow of Buttermere, and its outflow is the River Cocker, which meets the River Derwent at Cockermouth before entering the Irish Sea at Workington. It is in the unitary authority of Cumberland and the ceremonial county of Cumbria. It is in the parish of Buttermere, and its western shore forms part of the western boundary of the parish.

== Geography ==
The hill of Mellbreak runs the full length of the lake on its western side; as Alfred Wainwright described it 'no pairing of hill and lake in Lakeland have a closer partnership than these'. The lake is owned by the National Trust.

Scale Force, the highest waterfall in the Lake District, feeds the lake and has a drop of 170 feet (52 m).

== Toponymy ==
"The meaning of 'Crummock' seems to be 'Crooked one', from British" (Brythonic Celtic) "'crumbaco'-'crooked'". This may refer to the winding course of the River Cocker, which flows out of the lake, or refer to the bending nature of the lake itself. It may also refer to the road that runs along the eastern side of the lake, which is extremely winding and 'crooked'. The word "'water' is the main Lakeland term for 'lake'".

== History ==
Water from the lake was treated at Cornhow water treatment works, near Loweswater, and was distributed to the towns of Silloth-on-Solway, Maryport, Workington, and many smaller towns, villages, and hamlets in the surrounding area for drinking and all other uses. This use ceased in October 2022 with the commissioning of the United Utilities pipeline to bring supply from Thirlmere.

Crummock Water gained attention in 1988 when the body of Sheena Owlett was found in the lake. It later transpired she had been murdered in Wetherby, West Yorkshire.

== Gallery ==
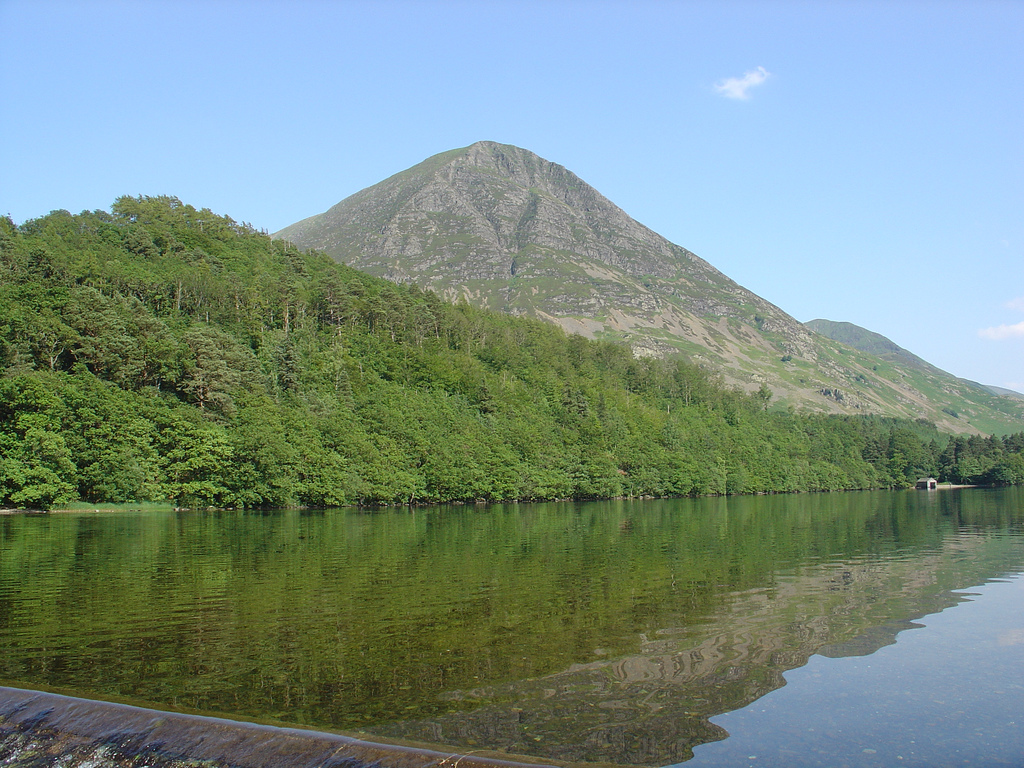
Crummock Water with Grasmoor in the distance

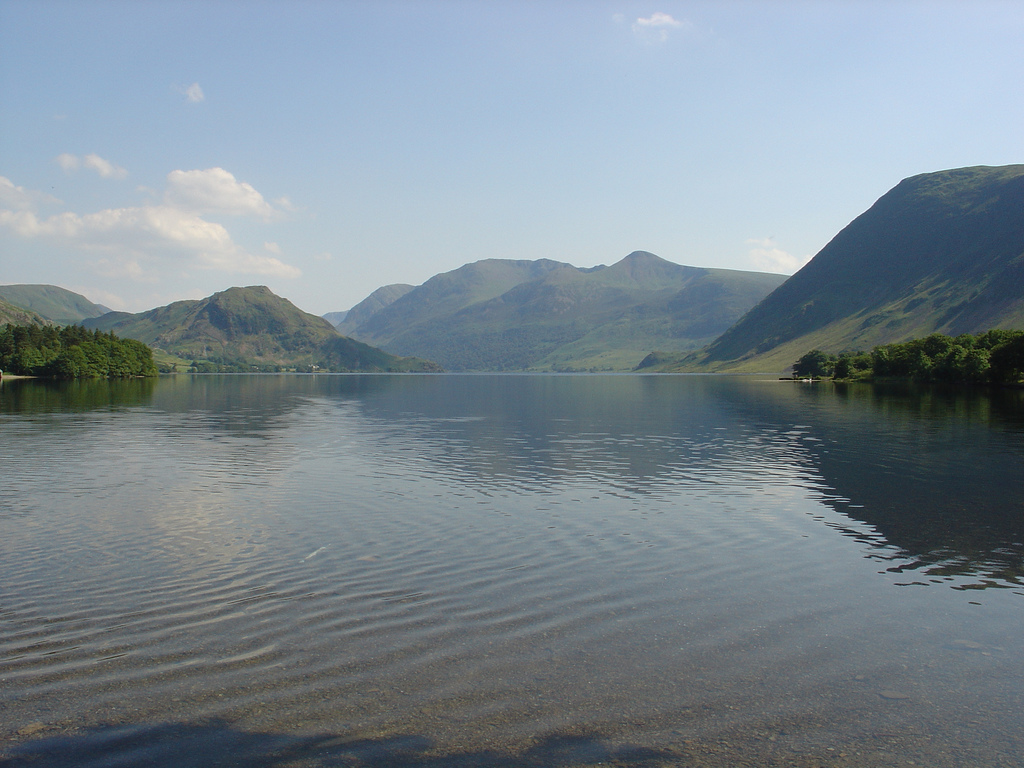
Looking down Crummock towards Buttermere

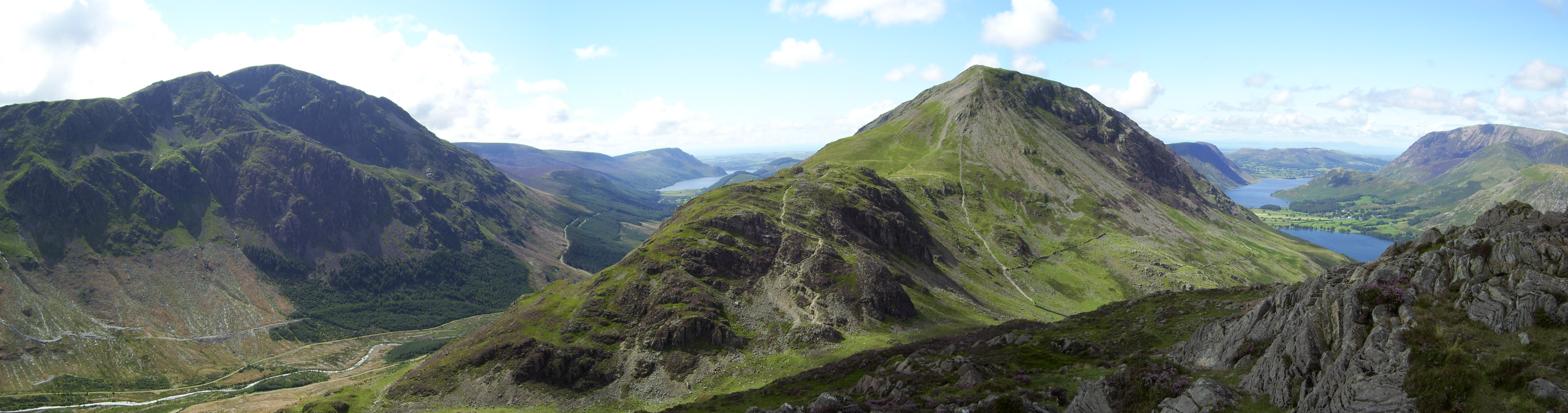
High Crag, Pillar, Buttermere and Crummock Water from Haystacks

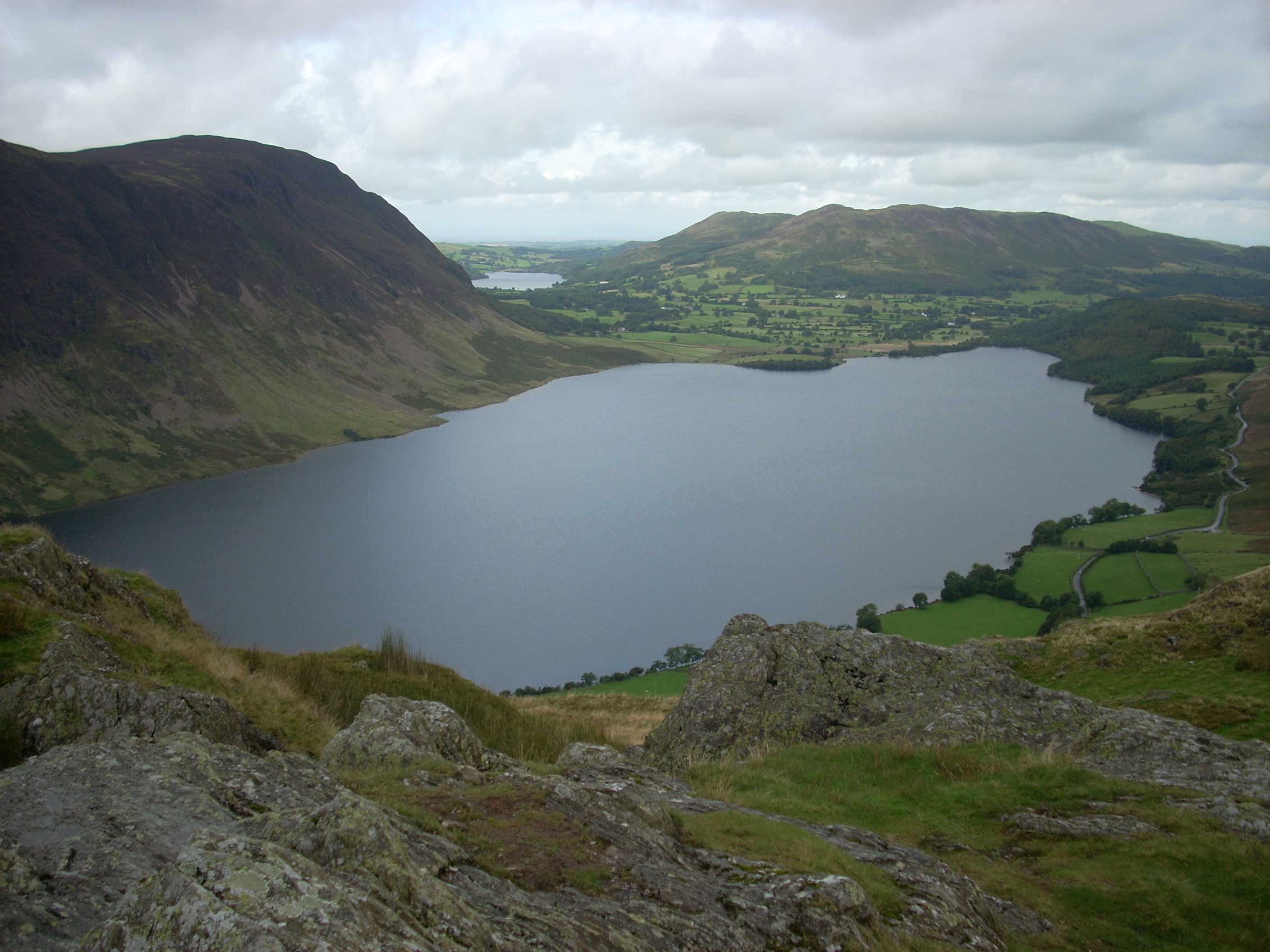
The western end of Crummock Water from Rannerdale Knotts

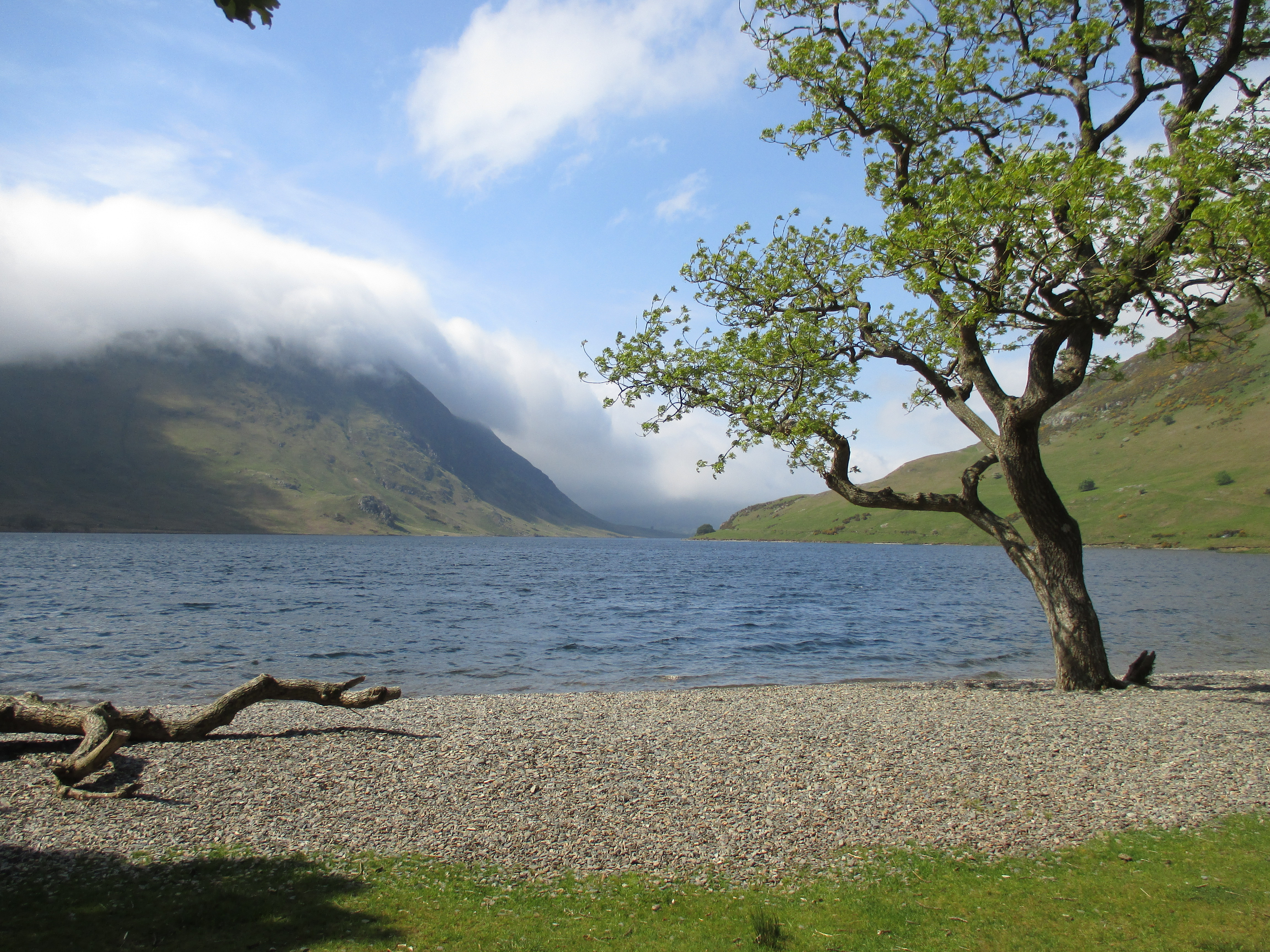
Crummock Water from the south-eastern end
