= List of churches in Allerdale =

The following is a list of churches in the former Allerdale district in Cumbria, England. This area is now part of the Cumberland unitary authority area.

The following parishes have no active churches: Bewaldeth and Snittlegarth; Bothel and Threapland; Dundraw; Greysouthen; Holme Low; Oughterside and Allerby; Papcastle; Winscales; Woodside.

The former district has an estimated 121 churches for 96,422 people, a ratio of one church for every 797 inhabitants.

== Map of medieval parish churches ==
For the purposes of this map medieval is taken to be pre-1485. It is of note that Cumbria, unlike most parts of England, saw a sustained programme of church building during the 16th and 17th centuries as the more remote parts of the district were settled.

Medieval parish churches in Allerdale

== List ==
Name	Civil parish (settlement)	Dedication	Web	Founded	Denomination	Benefice	Notes
St Herbert, Braithwaite	Above Derwent (Braithwaite)	Herbert of D'water		1900	Church of England	Upper Derwent	
Newlands Church	Above Derwent (Newlands)			C16th	Church of England	Upper Derwent	Current building 1843
St Mary, Thornthwaite	Ab. Derwent (Thornthwaite)	Mary		Medieval	Church of England	Upper Derwent	Medieval chapel of ease; current church 1831
St Andrew, Aikton	Aikton	Andrew		Medieval	Church of England	East Solway Churches	Benefice also includes three churches in the former Carlisle District
All Saints, Allhallows	Allhallows	All Saints		1896-1899	Church of England	Binsey Team	Replaced earlier 12th-century church nearby
Christ Church, Allonby	Allonby	Jesus		1744	Church of England	Allonby, Crosscanonby, Dearham	Rebuilt 1845
St Kentigern, Aspatria	Aspatria	Mungo		Ancient	Church of England	Aspatria with Hayton, Gilcrux	Rebuilt 1846-1848
Aspatria Methodist Church	Aspatria			1898	Methodist	Wigton Methodist Circuit	
St John, Bassenthwaite	Bassenthwaite	John ?		1878	Church of England	Binsey Team	Originally chapel of ease since St Bega's so far from village
St Bega, Bassenthwaite	Bassenthwaite	Bega		Ancient	Church of England	Binsey Team	
Bassenthwaite Methodist Church	Bassenthwaite			1865	Methodist	Keswick & Cockermouth MC	
Blennerhasset Evangelical Mission	Blennerhasset & Torpenhow				FIEC		Affinity
St Michael & All Angels, Torpenhow	Blennerhasset & Torpenhow	Michael & Angels		Medieval	Church of England	Binsey Team	
St Michael, Mosser	Blindbothel	Michael		C16th	Church of England	Clifton, Dean & Mosser	Originally chapel of ease. Current building 1773
St Michael, Isel	Blindcrake	Michael		Medieval	Church of England	Binsey Team	
All Saints, Boltongate	Boltons	All Saints		C14th	Church of England	Binsey Team	
Holy Trinity, Grange in Borrowdale	Borrowdale (Grange)	Trinity		1861	Church of England	Upper Derwent	Also hosts Methodist services since Grange Meth Ch. closed
St Andrew, Borrowdale	Borrowdale	Andrew		1687	Church of England	Upper Derwent	Rebuilt 1825
St Michael, Bowness-on-Solway	Bowness	Michael		Medieval	Church of England	Bowness, Kirkbride, Newton Arlosh	
Solway Methodist Church	Bowness (Port Carlisle)			1861	Methodist	North Cumbria MC	
St Bridget, Bridekirk	Bridekirk	Brigid of Kildare		Medieval	Church of England	Cockermouth Area Team	Rebuilt 1868
St Bridget, Brigham	Brigham	Brigid of Kildare		Medieval	Church of England	Brigham, Gt B'ton, B'ton Moor	
Brigham Methodist Church	Brigham			1883	Methodist	Keswick & Cockermouth MC	
St Mungo, Bromfield	Bromfield	Mungo		Ancient	Church of England	Solway Plain Team	Current building 1100s
Christ Church, Great Broughton	Broughton	Jesus		1856	Church of England	Cockermouth Area Team	
Broughton Evangelical Church	Broughton				Unknown		
Broughton Baptist Church	Broughton						No information other than a photo, may be defunct
Broughton Methodist Church	Broughton			pre-1859	Methodist		Current building 1907
St Columba, Broughton Moor	Broughton Moor	Columba		1905	Church of England	Brigham, Gt B'ton, B'ton Moor	
St James, Buttermere	Buttermere	James		1507	Church of England	Lorton, Loweswater, Buttermere	Rebuilt 1840
St Kentigern, Caldbeck	Caldbeck	Mungo		Ancient	Church of England	Caldbeck, C. Sowerby, Sebergham	Current building 1112. Benefice includes one church in Eden
Caldbeck Methodist Chapel	Caldbeck			1863	Methodist	Wigton Methodist Circuit	
Hesket Newmarket Free Church	Caldbeck (Hesk. Newmarket)			1850s	FIEC (1993)		Affinity
St Peter, Camerton	Camerton	Peter		Medieval	Church of England	Camerton, Seaton	Rebuilt 1794
All Saints, Cockermouth	Cockermouth	All Saints		Medieval	Church of England	Cockermouth Area Team	Current building 1854
Christ Church, Cockermouth	Cockermouth	Jesus		1865	Church of England	Cockermouth Area Team	
St Joseph, Cockemouth	Cockermouth	Joseph		1856	Roman Catholic	Keswick & C'mouth Catholic	
Cockermouth Methodist Church	Cockermouth			pre-1932	Methodist	Keswick & Cockermouth MC	Current building 1932
Cockermouth URC	Cockermouth			1651	URC		Current building 1850
Cockermouth Friends Meeting House	Cockermouth			1688	Quakers	Cumberland Area Quakers	Current building 1884
King's Church Cockermouth	Cockermouth	Jesus			Newfrontiers		
St John the Evangelist, Crosscanonby	Crosscanonby	John the Evangelist		Medieval	Church of England	Allonby, Crosscanonby, Dearham	
St Oswald, Dean	Dean	Oswald of N'umbria		Medieval	Church of England	Clifton, Dean & Mosser	
St Philip, Eaglesfield	Dean (Eaglesfield)	Philip		1891	Church of England	Clifton, Dean & Mosser	AKA the John Dalton Memorial Church
Pardshaw Friends Meeting House	Dean (Pardshaw)			1729	Quakers	Cumberland Area Quakers	Home to Pardshaw Young Friends' Centre
St Mungo, Dearham	Dearham	Mungo		Medieval	Church of England	Allonby, Crosscanonby, Dearham	
Dearham Methodist Church	Dearham				Methodist	Solway Methodist Circuit	
St Cuthbert, Embleton	Embleton	Cuthbert		Medieval	Church of England	Binsey Team	Rebuilt 1806
St Mary, Gilcrux	Gilcrux	Mary		Medieval	Church of England	Aspatria with Hayton, Gilcrux	
Great Clifton Methodist Church	Great Clifton				Methodist	Solway Methodist Circuit	
St James, Hayton	Hayton and Mealo	James		1867	Church of England	Aspatria with Hayton, Gilcrux	
St Mary, Abbeytown	Holme Abbey (Abbeytown)	Mary		Medieval	Church of England	Solway Plain Team	Largely destroyed by fire 2009
Abbeytown Methodist Chapel	Holme Abbey (Abbeytown)			1858	Methodist	Wigton Methodist Circuit	
St John the Evangelist, Newton Arlosh	Holme East Waver	John the Evangelist		Medieval	Church of England	Bowness, Kirkbride, Newton Arlosh	
St Cuthbert, Holme St Cuthbert	Holme St Cuthbert	Cuthbert		1845	Church of England	Solway Plain Team	
St James, Ireby	Ireby and Uldale	James		1845	Church of England	Binsey Team	Replaced Norman church a mile away (redundant 1971)
St James, Uldale	Ireby and Uldale	James		Medieval	Church of England	Binsey Team	
St Kentigern, Crosthwaite	Keswick (Great Crosthwaite)	Mungo		Ancient	Church of England	Crosthwaite	
St John, Keswick	Keswick	John the Evangelist		1838	Church of England	Keswick	Designed by Anthony Salvin
Our Lady of the Lakes & St Charles, Keswick	Keswick	Mary & Charles Borr			Roman Catholic	Keswick & C'mouth Catholic	
Orthodox Parish of SS Bega, Mungo & Herbert	Keswick	Bega, Mungo, Herbert		2007	AROCWE		Also meet in Braithwaite Methodist Chapel
Keswick Methodist Church	Keswick			pre-1835	Methodist	Keswick & Cockermouth MC	Current building 1863
Lake Road Chapel, Keswick	Keswick			1654	EFCC		Affinity. Settled on current site 1803, building rebuilt 1858
King's Church Keswick	Keswick	Jesus			Newfrontiers		
Keswick Friends Meeting House	Keswick			c. 1665	Quakers	Cumberland Area Quakers	Current building 1994
Keswick Gospel Hall	Keswick						
St Peter, Kirkbampton	Kirkbampton	Peter		Medieval	Church of England	East Solway Churches	
St Bride, Kirkbride	Kirkbride	Brigid of Kildare		Medieval	Church of England	Bowness, Kirkbride, Newton Arlosh	
St Luke, Clifton	Little Clifton	Luke		Medieval	Church of England	Clifton, Dean & Mosser	Current building 1858
St Cuthbert, Lorton	Lorton	Cuthbert		Medieval	Church of England	Lorton, Loweswater, Buttermere	Rebuilt 1807-1809
St Bartholomew, Loweswater	Loweswater	Bartholomew		Medieval	Church of England	Lorton, Loweswater, Buttermere	Current building 1829. Chapel of ease until recent times
St Nicholas, Flimby	Maryport (Flimby)	Nicholas		Medieval	Church of England	Maryport	Current building 1794. Chapel of ease until 1546
St Mary, Maryport	Maryport	Mary		1760	Church of England	Maryport	Originally a chapel of ease to Crosscanonby. Rebuilt 1890
All Souls, Netherton	Maryport	All Saints		1886	Church of England	Maryport	
Trinity Baptist Church, Maryport	Maryport	Trinity		1807	Ind. Bapt.		Current building 1968-1973
Our Lady & St Patrick, Maryport	Maryport	Mary & Patrick		1844	Roman Catholic		
St Mark's Methodist Church, Maryport	Maryport	Mark		1806	Methodist	Solway Methodist Circuit	Relocated to new buildings 1864, 1973
Maryport Pentecostal Church	Maryport				Unknown		AKA Maryport Community Church
Furnace Road Gospel Hall	Maryport				Unknown		Building was once a Baptist chapel, built 1861
St Cuthbert, Plumbland	Plumbland	Cuthbert		Medieval	Church of England	Binsey Team	Rebuilt 1871
Plumbland Evangelical Chapel	Plumbland				FIEC		Affinity
St Paul, Seaton	Seaton	Paul		1882	Church of England	Camerton, Seaton	Became own parish 1987
Seaton Methodist Church	Seaton				Methodist	Solway Methodist Circuit	
St Mary, Sebergham	Sebergham	Mary		Medieval	Church of England	Caldbeck, C. Sowerby, Sebergham	
St James, Welton	Sebergham	James		C19th	Church of England	Westward Group	
St Barnabas, Setmurthy	Setmurthy	Barnabas		Medieval	Church of England	Binsey Team	Current building 1794. Previously chapel of ease to Brigham
Christ Church, Silloth	Silloth on Solway	Jesus		1870	Church of England	Solway Plain Team	
The Assumption, Silloth	Silloth on Solway	Assumption of Mary			Roman Catholic		
St Andrew's URC, Silloth	Silloth on Solway	Andrew		1887	URC		
Trinity Methodist Church, Silloth	Silloth on Solway	Trinity		1875	Methodist	Wigton Methodist Circuit	
Silloth Evangelical Free Church	Silloth on Solway				FIEC		Affinity
Greenrow Pentecostal Church	Silloth on Solway			1930s	Unknown		
St John, St John's in the Vale	St John's C'rigg & Wythburn	John the Evangelist		pre-1550	Church of England	St John's, Threlkeld, Wythburn	Earliest mention 1554. Building 1845
Wythburn Church	St John's C'rigg & Wythburn	Unknown		pre-1550	Church of England	St John's, Threlkeld, Wythburn	Earliest mention 1554. Current building 1640
St Andrew, Thursby	Thursby	Andrew		Ancient	Church of England	Thursby	Current building 1846
Thursby Methodist Church	Thursby				Methodist	North Cumbria MC	
Underskiddaw Parish Room	Underskiddaw			1829	Church of England	Crosthwaite	
Christ Church, Waverton	Waverton	Jesus		1865	Church of England	Solway Plain Team	
St Matthew, Westnewton	Westnewton	Matthew		1857	Church of England	Solway Plain Team	
St Hilda, Westward	Westward	Hilda of Whitby		pre-1570	Church of England	Westward Group	Rebuilt 1786
Holy Trinity, Rosley	Westward	Trinity		1840s	Church of England	Westward Group	
St Mary, Wigton	Wigton	Mary		Medieval	Church of England	Wigton	Current building 1788
Wigton Methodist Church	Wigton			1819	Methodist	Wigton Methodist Circuit	
St Cuthbert, Wigton	Wigton	Cuthbert		1837	Roman Catholic		
Lowmoor Evangelical Church	Wigton			1997	Unknown		
St John, Workington	Workington	John the Evangelist		1823	Church of England	Workington St John's	
St Mary, Westfield	Workington	Mary		1887	Church of England	Workington St Mary's	
St Michael, Workington	Workington	Michael		Ancient	Church of England	Workington St Michael's	Current building 1770
St Mary, Harrington	Workington (Harrington)	Mary		Medieval	Church of England	Harrington	Rebuilt 1634 and 1884-1885
Our Lady Star of the Sea & St Michael, Workington	Workington	Mary & Michael		1813	Roman Catholic	Good Shepherd Workington	Rebuilt 1876
St Gregory, Westfield	Workington	Pope Gregory I		1964	Roman Catholic	Good Shepherd Workington	
St Mary's Catholic Church, Harrington	Workington (Harrington)	Mary		1872	Roman Catholic	Good Shepherd Workington	Current building 1892
Harrington Methodist Church	Workington (Harrington)			1828	Methodist	Solway Methodist Circuit	
Influence Church	Workington			2021	AoG		
United Church, Workington	Workington				Methodist / URC	Solway Methodist Circuit	Methodist and URC churches merged 2008
Harrington URC	Workington (Harrington)				URC		
Emmanuel Church Workington	Workington	Jesus			ECFCE		
Workington Gospel Hall	Workington				Gospel Hall		
Westfield Gospel Hall	Workington				Gospel Hall		
Grace Baptist Church, Workington	Workington						
Christ Central Workington	Workington			2011	Newfrontiers		Bridge Church and Hope Church merged 2011
St Margaret, Wythop	Wythop	Margaret the Virgin		1865	CoE	Binsey Team	

== Defunct churches ==
Name	Civil parish (settlement)	Dedication	Web	Founded	Redundant	Denomination	Notes
St Paul's, Causewayhead	Holme Low	Paul		1845	2016	Church of England	
Christ Church, Maryport	Maryport	Jesus		1872	2013	Church of England	
Holy Trinity, West Seaton	Seaton	Trinity		1891		Church of England	
Holy Trinity, Northside	Workington	Trinity		c. 1900	2015	Church of England	
