= Listed buildings in Above Derwent =

Above Derwent is a civil parish in the Cumberland district in Cumbria, England. It contains 16 listed buildings that are recorded in the National Heritage List for England. All the listed buildings are designated at Grade II, the lowest of the three grades, which is applied to "buildings of national importance and special interest". The parish is in the Lake District National Park, and it includes the settlements of Braithwaite, Thornthwaite, Portinscale, Stair and Little Town. Parts of the parish are agricultural, and much of it consists of fells and mountains. All the listed buildings are in the settlements and the valleys. Most of them are, or originated as, houses, farmhouses, and farm buildings. The other listed buildings include churches, war memorial and a bridge.

== Buildings ==
Name and location	Photograph	Date	Notes
Lane Foot Farmhouse; 54.61085°N 3.19706°W	—	Mid 16th century	Originally a farmhouse, later used as a private house, it is roughcast on a chamfered plinth with a green slate roof. There are two storeys and four bays, and in the front is a 20th-century wooden porch. The windows are sashes with plain reveals.
Peter House; 54.60189°N 3.19211°W	—	16th century	The house is in rubble with a stone slab roof and is in two storeys. The main part has three bays, there is a rear outshut, and at the front is a projecting former bakehouse and workshop. The windows are in deep reveals, one is a sliding sash window, and the others are later replacements.
Stair House; 54.58012°N 3.18369°W	—	1647	The house is in rendered stone with a Westmorland slate roof, in two storeys and three bays. The doorway to the right has a moulded doorcase and a lintel inscribed with initials and the date. Some of the windows on the front are horizontal sashes, and also on the front is a panel inscribed with the name of the house. At the rear is a gabled stair tower, and inside the house is a bressumer.
Low House Farm; 54.56119°N 3.19640°W	—	17th century	A linear range of domestic and agricultural buildings built in local rubble, boulders, and slate, with Westmorland green slate roofs, dating from the 17th to the 19th centuries. The original part is a long house with accommodation for people and for animals. Attached to this is an 18th-century farmhouse, rendered, in two storeys and three bays, and a 19th-century barn. Inside the long house is n inglenook.
Low Snab and barn 54.55747°N 3.19332°W	—	Mid 17th century	A farmhouse and attached barn, the house is in rendered stone, and the barn is in stone, both under a green slate roof. The house has two storeys and three bays, a stone porch with side seats, and sash windows. The barn to the right has doorways, including a loft doorway, and ventilation slits. Inside the house is an inglenook.
Hall Garth Farmhouse; 54.61221°N 3.20197°W	—	Late 17th century	A roughcast farmhouse with a green slate roof, in two storeys and three bays. The windows are sashes, and on the front of the house is a 20th-century open porch.
The Old Manor; 54.59663°N 3.18183°W	—	1726	A stuccoed house on a chamfered plinth with an eaves cornice and quoins, it has a green slate roof, and is in Classical style. There are two storeys and three bays. The central doorway has pilasters, a pediment, and a triglyph and rosette frieze. The windows are sashes, those in the upper floor being bowed, and all with architraves.
Powe House; 54.60301°N 3.16542°W	—	1737	A stuccoed house with quoins and a green slate roof, it is in two storeys and five bays. The central doorway has a Tuscan doorcase with a pediment, and the windows are sashes with architraves.
Ladstock Country House Hotel; 54.61309°N 3.20484°W	—	Late 18th century	Originally a house, later used as a hotel, it was extended in 1902. The hotel is built in Skiddaw slate rubble with sandstone dressings and a green slate roof. The building is in two storeys with four bays and additional bays to the right. On the front is a slated verandah porch that is flanked by bay windows with mullions on the ground floor and casement windows above. Most of the other windows are casements, but there is one original sash window. Inside the building is an inglenook.
Hall Garth House and former stable/barn 54.61260°N 3.20237°W	—	Late 18th or early 19th century	Originally a farmhouse with an adjoining barn and stable, it was later converted into a private house. The former house is roughcast, the former barn is in Skiddaw slate rubble, and the roof is in green slate. The house has two storeys, three bays, and sash windows. Some of the windows in the former barn are sashes, and others are casements.
Little Braithwaite Farmhouse; 54.59701°N 3.18176°W	—	Early 19th century	The farmhouse is roughcast with quoins and a green slate roof. It has two storeys and three bays. The windows are sashes; they and the doorway have painted stone surrounds.
Stair Bridge; 54.58100°N 3.18233°W		Early 19th century	The bridge carries a road over Newlands Beck. It is in sandstone and cobble, and consists of a single segmental arch with a hump back. The bridge has slate voussoirs and a solid parapet with rubble coping.
St Mary's Church; 54.61805°N 3.19945°W		1832–33	The church was extended in 1853. It is in slate rubble and has a roof of green slate. The church consists of a nave with a west porch, transepts, and a chancel with a north vestry. There is a west bellcote, and the windows are lancets.
Newlands Church and former School; 54.56361°N 3.19251°W		1843	The schoolroom was added in 1887, and has since been used as a meeting room. The buildings are roughcast with green slate roofs. The church has a combined three-bay nave and chancel, a south porch, tall round-headed windows, and a twin bellcote at the west end. The former school is in one storey with two bays and casement windows. On the wall is an inscribed plaque.
Lingholm; 54.58984°N 3.15595°W		1871-75	A country house by Alfred Waterhouse and later extended and altered. It is built in local slate stone, partly roughcast, with red and yellow sandstone dressings, and roofs of Westmorland slate. It consists of a main range facing east to Derwent Water, and an L-shaped rear service range. Its features include gables, dormers, windows that are mullioned or mullioned and transomed, and balconies.
Above Derwent War Memorial; 54.60289°N 3.17563°W		1921	The war memorial stands in a patch of woodland, and is in stone. It consists of a Celtic Cross on a tapering shaft, on a plinth and a base. The cross head has a carved monogram, Greek key design, and knotwork decoration. On the lower art of the shaft and the plinth are an inscription and the names of those lost in the First World War, and there is a slate tablet with the names of those lost in the Second World War.
