= Coledale horseshoe =

Hiking trail in the Lake District, England

The Coledale horseshoe, or Coledale Round, is a semi-circle of fells surrounding Coledale in the Lake District, England.

It provides excellent ridge-walking over the fells. Due to the topography, there are multiple variants of the horseshoe with the option for walkers to add in a variety of extra peaks if they choose.

== Fell structure ==
A horseshoe of high summits surrounds Coledale: from Grisedale Pike in the north, round through Hopegill Head, down to the pass of Coledale Hause, and then up to Eel Crag (named 'Cragg Hill' on Ordnance Survey maps) and Sail. To the south, the ridge splits into two after Sail, with Scar Crags and Causey Pike on the outer ridge, and Outerside and Barrow on the inner, forming what Wainwright called: "a lower and parallel ridge like an inner balcony".

== The Rounds ==
There is no definitive version of the round. The Coledale Horseshoe fell running race takes in Grisedale Pike before dropping down to Coledale Hause, and then covers Eel Crag, Sail, Outerside and Barrow, which is the shortest version of the Horseshoe. It is common to add Hopegill Head to this core version after Grisedale Pike and before the hause.

The most obvious other variant is to take the outer southern ridge over Scar Crags and Causey Pike rather than the inner ridge over Outerside and Barrow, with the stretch from Eel Crag to Causey Pike considered by Wainwright as "a grand ridge walk...an excellent ridge-walk". which figured among his top ten ridge walks. Walkers may combine the two southern ridges by connecting between Causey Pike and Outerside over High Moss. Additionally, either or both of the peaks of Wandope and Grasmoor can be visited between Eel Crag and Coledale Hause for an extended walk.

== See also ==
- Coledale Beck
- Fairfield horseshoe
