= Coledale (Cumbria) =

Valley in the Lake District, England

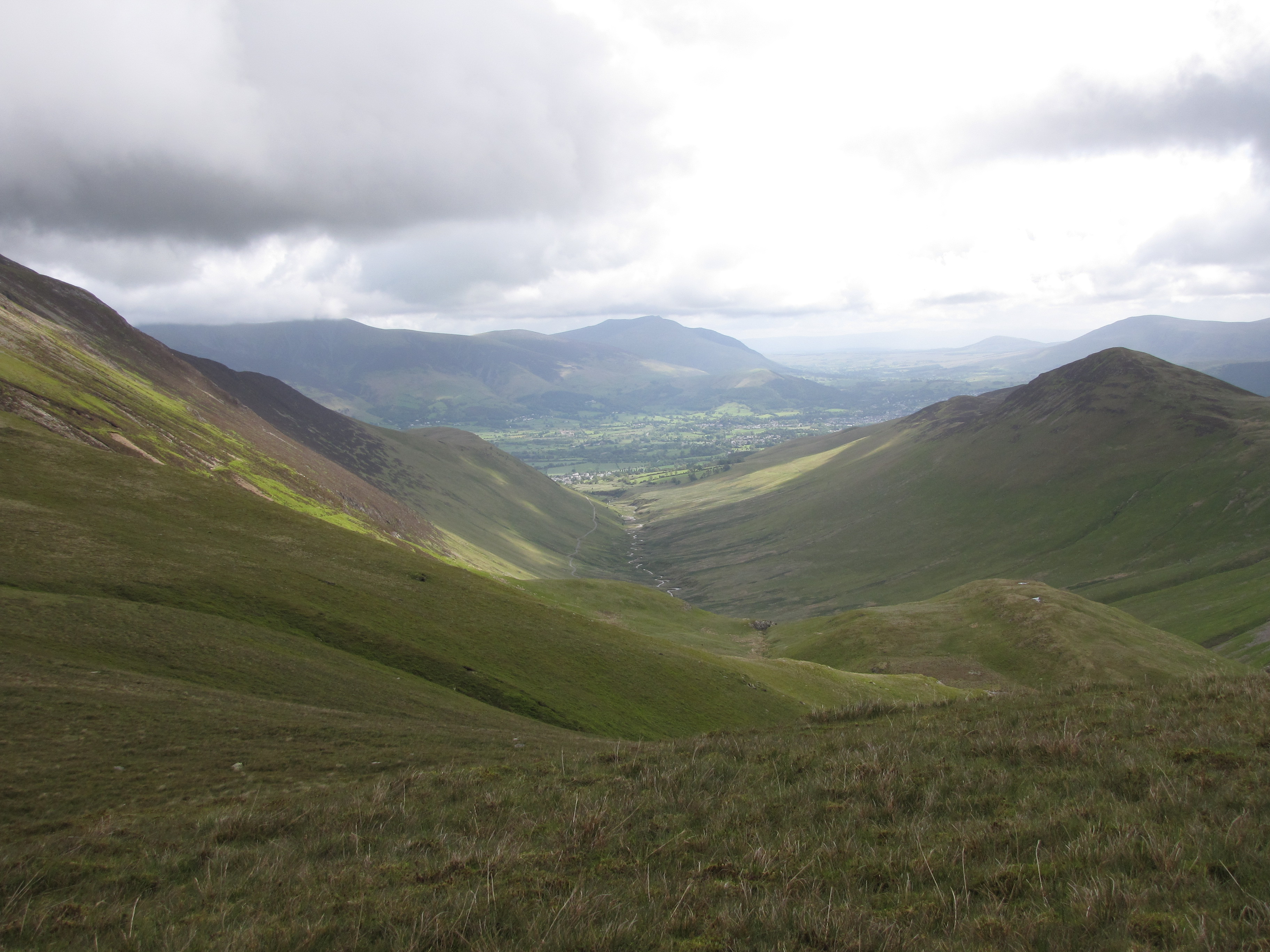
- Coledale seen from Coledale Hause with the vale of Keswick and the fell Blencathra in the background.

Geography
- Location: Lake District, Cumbria
- Interactive map of Coledale

Coledale is a valley in the northwestern region of the Lake District in Cumbria, England.

== Geography ==
Coledale is a narrow U-shaped valley running approximately north-east towards the Derwent Valley floodplain and the village of Braithwaite at the northeastern end. The valley river Coledale Beck feeds into Newlands Beck and is fed by small streams from the valley sides and head, including Birkthwaite Beck, and Pudding Force.

At the head of the valley a large rock formation is found named Force Crag, which forms a waterfall 'Low Force' as Pudding Beck passes over it.

The valley is ringed by peaks popular with tourists (Grisedale Pike, Hopegill Head, Coledale Hause, Crag Hill (formerly Eel Crag), Sail, Sail Pass, and Outerside) forming a horseshoe ridge walk known as Coledale horseshoe or 'Coledale round'.

== Force Crag Mine ==
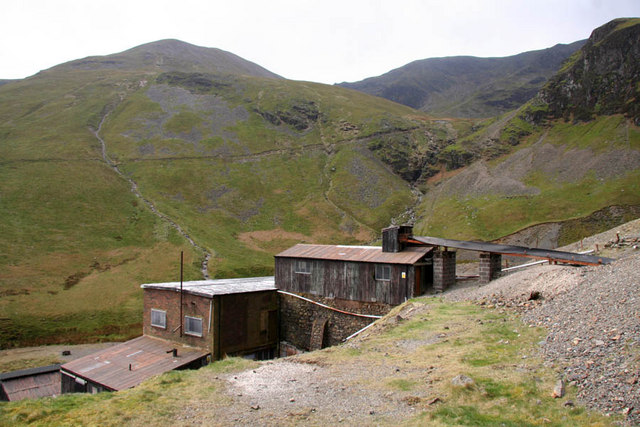
Derelict remains of Force Crag Mine photographed in May 2009

Coledale's most notable feature is Force Crag Mine; the buildings, spoil heap and associated structures of which are practically the only sign of human influence in the upper valley.

Mineral workings may date back to 1578 in the valley Significant workings did not begin until the 1800s with lead and silver being mined until 1865, ending with a drop in the price of lead rendering it uneconomic. Later Barytes was mined, with 5300 tons of ore being produced up to 1879 when again market forces led to production ending. The mine was worked on and off with various changes in operation, and under different owners, with lead, barium and zinc ores being extracted. In 1990 a collapse in the mine led to it being closed, and ownership passed to the National Trust.

There were two workings of the mine, the low and high, and as of 2015 the mill of the mine still stood. The building is a scheduled monument and the mine is a site of special scientific interest. The buildings can now be visited by appointment through the National Trust.

As well as an aerial ropeway for transporting ore to the mill built in the late 1930s, the mine also operated a small narrow gauge railway in the mine, utilising diesel and battery powered locomotives, one of which (Wingrove & Rogers Battery loco) is now at the Springfield Agricultural Railway, three 2 ft (0.61 m) gauge wagons from the mine are to be found at the Moseley museum in Redruth, Cornwall.
