= Chapel Beck =

River in Cumbria, England

Coordinates: 54.6229°N 3.1919°W

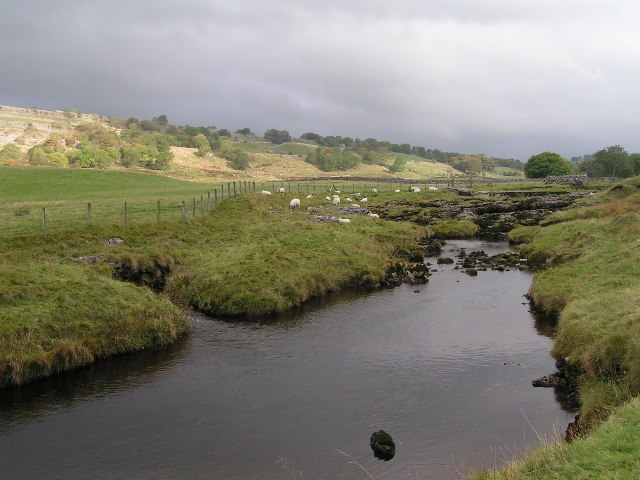
God's Bridge across Chapel Beck

Chapel Beck is a minor river in the county of Cumbria in England.

The beck rises in the Whinlatter Forest in the Lake District at the confluence of Grisedale Gill and Sanderson Gill, streams draining the mountain of Grisedale Pike. The two streams meet at Revelin Moss to form Comb Beck. Comb Beck is fed by Comb Gill which, along with its tributary Black Gill, flows southward through Thornthwaite Forest.

Comb Beck continues through the village of Thornthwaite where it takes the name Chapel Beck, before flowing into Newlands Beck at Rough Mire which is just south of Bassenthwaite Lake.
