= Newlands Beck =

River in Cumbria, England

Coordinates: 54°37′43″N 3°11′54″W

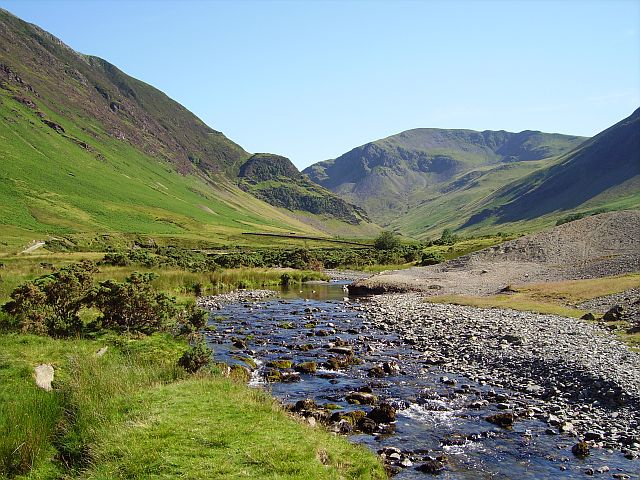
Newlands Beck looking upstream to Dale Head

Newlands Beck is a river of Cumbria in England.

The beck rises on Dale Head and flows northwards through the picturesque Newlands Valley, past the settlement of Little Town and between Braithwaite and Portinscale before flowing into Bassenthwaite Lake north east of Thornthwaite.

== Tributaries ==
- Chapel Beck
  - Comb Beck
    - Comb Gill
      - Black Gill
  - Grisedale Gill
  - Sanderson Gill
- Hallgarth Beck
  - Masmill Beck
- Pow Beck
- Coledale Beck
  - Barrow Gill
  - Birkthwaite Beck
  - Pudding Beck
- Pow Beck
- Stonycroft Gill
- Rigg Beck
- Yewthwaite Gill
- Keskadale Beck
  - Ill Gill
    - Ard Gill
  - Dudmanscomb Gill
  - High Hole Beck
  - Moss Beck
- Scope Beck
  - Deep Gill
- Parrocks Gill
- Barnes Gill
- Near Broadgill
- Lewthwaite Gill
- Far Broadgill
- Step Gill
- Near Tongue Gill
- Far Tongue Gill
