= Coledale Beck =

River in Cumbria, England

Coordinates: 54.5996°N 3.1824°W

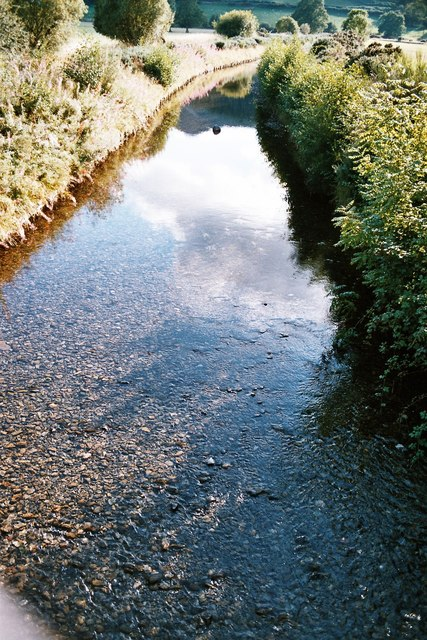
Coledale Beck

Coledale Beck is a minor river running through Cumbria in England.

== Course ==
The beck rises north east of Eel Crag, where Pudding Beck meets Birkthwaite Beck. From there, Coledale Beck runs east north east through Coledale, between Grisedale Pike and Causey Pike. Emerging from the valley, the beck runs through the village of Braithwaite, before feeding Newlands Beck, on the way picking up Barrow Gill (running north from Barrow). Wainwright singled out the latter stream for its exceptional ravine, which he described as “a gorge of amazing proportions for so slender a stream and deeper even than Piers Gill”.

== Literary associations ==
- David Wright in his poem ‘Storm’ (about the exceptional cloudburst of 1966) wrote of the Beck how “I didn’t expect the animal under our bridge...the livid rapid/ That lipped the bank and, reared on hind legs, battered/ the stone arch, hurtling missiles…. The beck had its dander up, and wonderfully….”.
