= Scar Crags =

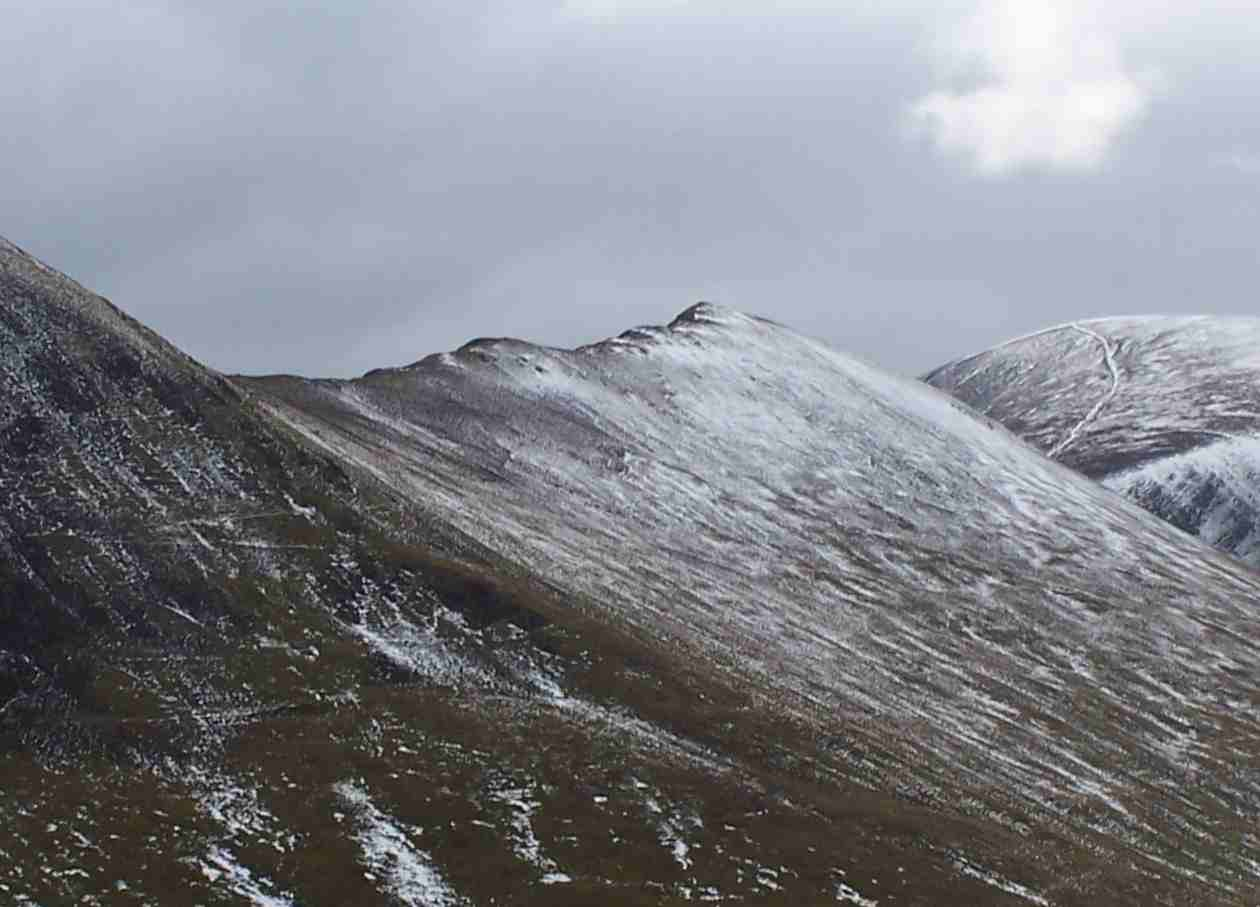
- The northern slopes of Scar Crags from Stonycroft Gill.

Highest point
- Elevation: 672 m (2,205 ft)
- Prominence: 55 m (180 ft)
- Parent peak: Crag Hill
- Listing: Hewitt, Nuttall, Wainwright
- Coordinates: 54°34′28″N 3°13′36″W

Geography
- Location within the Lake District
- Location: Cumbria, England
- Parent range: Lake District, North Western Fells
- OS grid: NY208206
- Topo map: OS Landranger 89, 90, OS Explorer Outdoor Leisure 4

Scar Crags is a fell in the north-western part of the English Lake District in the county of Cumbria. It is one of the Coledale group of fells, situated 6.4 kilometres (4 miles) south west of Keswick, and reaches a height of 672 metres (2,205 ft).

== Topography ==
The fell is part of the ridge that extends eastward from Crag Hill and includes the adjoining fells of Sail and Causey Pike before dropping to the Newlands Valley. Scar Crags has steep craggy flanks on its southern side which fall away steeply to Rigg Beck, while the northern slopes are less steep and grassy as they drop to Stoneycroft Gill.

== Geology ==
The ridge line is composed of the laminated mudstone and siltstone of the Kirkstile Formation.

== Ascents ==
Scar Crags is very rarely climbed directly. The only feasible direct ascent follows an old mine road that starts from Stair and goes up Stoneycroft Gill to finish at Sail Pass, from where it is a short ascent to the fell summit. Scar Crags is more usually approached from the east, along the ridge from Causey Pike, or from the west from Sail. It is a busy fell, as it is part of the Coledale Round, a 17.5-kilometre (11-mile) walk starting and finishing at Braithwaite or Stair in the Newlands Valley and including the other nearby fells of Grisedale Pike, Hopegill Head, Eel Crag, Sail, and Causey Pike with over 1,300 metres (4,300 ft) of ascent.

== Summit ==
The top of the fell is grassy and often muddy, with a small cairn. It gives a view down onto Rigg Beck and provides views of the surrounding district.

== Mining ==
The northern slopes of Scar Crags, below Long Crag, contain the remains of the Lake District’s only cobalt mine. It was opened by the Keswick Mining Company in 1846, who invested £7,000 in the project. A road and an inclined tramway were built to convey the ore down to Stoneycroft in the Newlands valley. Four adits were driven into the hillside, the longest being about 60 metres (200 ft) in length. The mine was not a success as it was impossible to extract the mineral from the ore in the expected quantities; it later closed.
