= Coledale =

Coledale may refer to:

- Coledale (Cumbria), a valley in the English Lake District
- Coledale, New South Wales, a suburb of Wollongong in New South Wales, Australia
- Coledale, also refers to a part of the suburb of West Tamworth, New South Wales
