= Rigg Beck =

River in Cumbria, England

Coordinates: 54°34′16″N 3°11′02″W

Rigg Beck is a minor river of Cumbria in England.

Rigg Beck is also the name of a famous dwelling – the Purple House – placed where the Beck crosses the Keskadale road, and which formed an excellent starting point for exploring the fells.

== Source and course ==
Rigg Beck arises at the top of the high pass between Ard Crags and Causey Pike, of the latter of which it forms one boundary. The beck flows eventually into Newlands Beck.

The path alongside Rigg Beck forms an attractive pedestrian route between Newlands Valley and Buttermere.

== Literary associations ==
- The Scottish poet Margot Adamson wrote of the beck “Young as the grass that fringes where it sprays,/Old as the clefts from whence it takes its flight”.
- The Purple House (Rigg Beck) was associated with poets like Sylvia Plath and Ted Hughes.

== See also ==
- Keskadale Beck
