= Outerside =

Fell in the Lake District, Cumbria, England

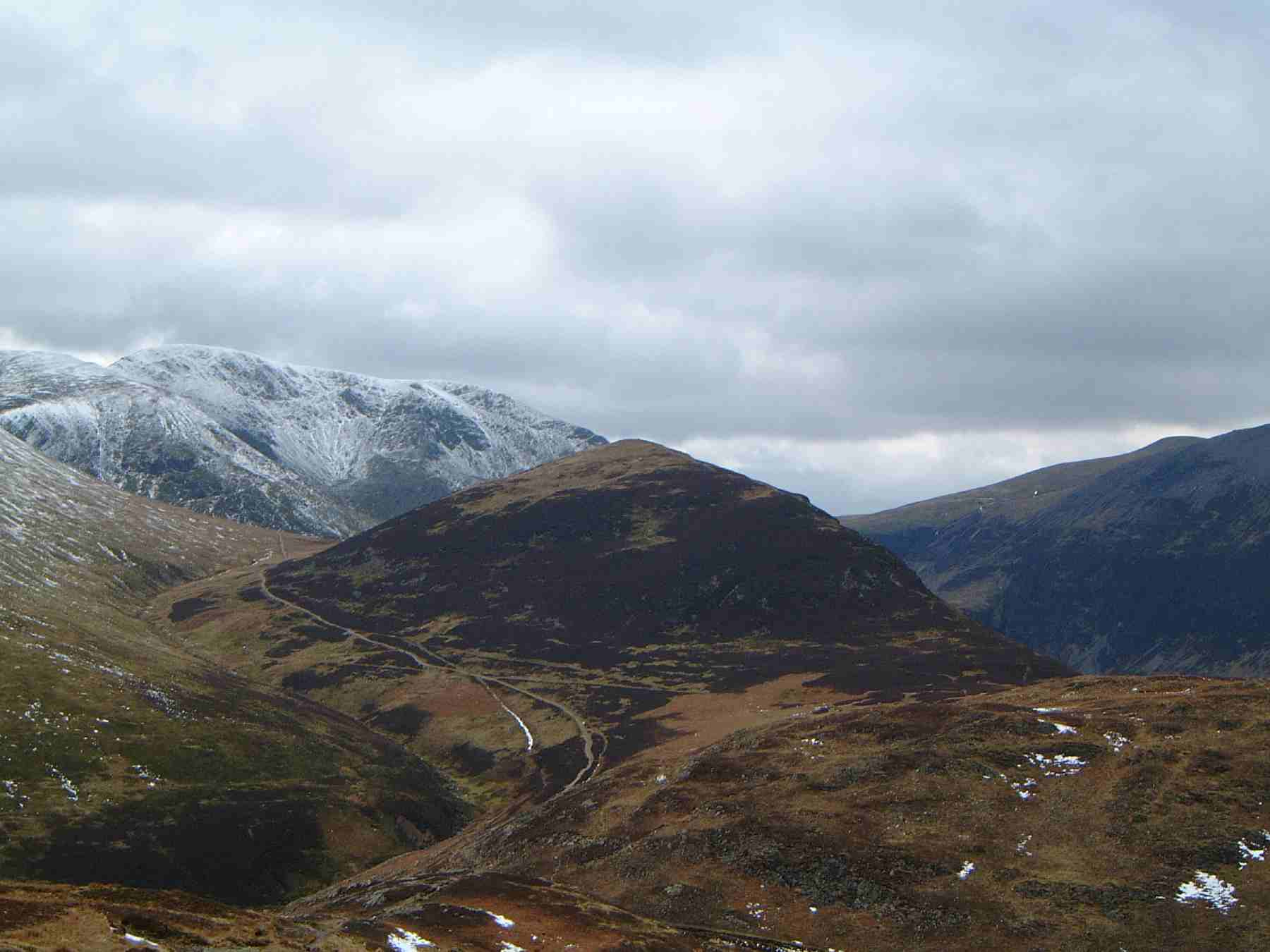
- Outerside seen from Barrow, 2 kilometres to the east. The snow-covered fell of Eel Crag is seen behind

Highest point
- Elevation: 596 m (1,955 ft)
- Prominence: c. 70 m (230 ft)
- Parent peak: Crag Hill
- Listing: Wainwright
- Coordinates: 54°34′54″N 3°13′20″W

Geography
- Location within the Lake District
- Location: Cumbria, England
- Parent range: Lake District, North Western Fells
- OS grid: NY211214
- Topo map: OS Landrangers 89, 90, Explorer OL4

Outerside is a fell in the Lake District in Cumbria, England. It is located 6 kilometres (4 miles) west of Keswick in the north western part of the national park and is a smaller member of the Coledale group of fells with a height of 568 metres (1,864 feet). The fell is part of a ridge on the southern side of Coledale which descends from the higher fell of Scar Crags and continues over the neighbouring smaller fell of Barrow before reaching the valley at the village of Braithwaite.

== Topography ==
The North Western Fells occupy the area between the rivers Derwent and Cocker, a broadly oval swathe of hilly country, elongated on a north–south axis. Two roads cross from east to west, dividing the fells into three convenient groups. The central sector, rising between Whinlatter Pass and Newlands Pass, includes Outerside.

The highest ground in the North Western Fells is an east–west ridge in this central sector, beginning with Grasmoor above Crummock Water and then gradually descending eastwards over Crag Hill, Sail, Scar Crags and Causey Pike. Outerside is a satellite of Scar Crags, standing out to the north of the main ridge across the marshy depression of High Moss, 1,625 ft (495 m).

Outerside has a conical profile in most views and its upper slopes are clad predominantly in heather. To the north of the fell runs the valley of Coledale, falling north eastwards to Braithwaite and the floodplain of the Derwent. To the south is the little dale of Stonycroft Gill, havings its birth at High Moss. It flows east between Outerside and Causey Pike to join Newlands Beck at Stair. All of the waters of Outerside thus run to Bassenthwaite Lake.

North east of Outerside the little ridge continues across Low Moss to the subsidiary top of Stile End, 1,466 ft (447 m). This was not treated as a separate fell by Alfred Wainwright, although some later guidebooks take a different view. Beyond is Barrow, a shapely fell overlooking Braithwaite village.

== Geology ==
The rocks of Outerside are representative of the Kirkstile Formation, laminated mudstone and siltstone also typical of the Skiddaw group. At High and Low Moss this is overlain by peat. The fell has no history of mining, unlike many of the surrounding hills.

== Ascents ==
The fell is ascended either from Braithwaite or Stair in the Newlands Valley; the ascent from Stair uses an old mine road up Stoneycroft Gill which crosses the shoulder of the fell at a height of 460 m (1,510 ft) from where the walker then strikes northerly to attain the summit. The direct route from Braithwaite follows Barrow Gill south westerly before going west to the highest point. The fell is often climbed along with the adjoining fell of Barrow to which it is connected by a ridge.

== Summit ==
The view from Outerside's summit cairn is restricted by the higher Coledale fells of Grisedale Pike, Crag Hill and Causey Pike in an arc to the west but there is a good prospect of the Helvellyn range to the east and the Skiddaw group to the north east, as well as a bird's-eye view directly down into Coledale with the Force Crag mine at its head.
