= Scope Beck =

River in Cumbria, England

Coordinates: 54.5623°N 3.1913°W

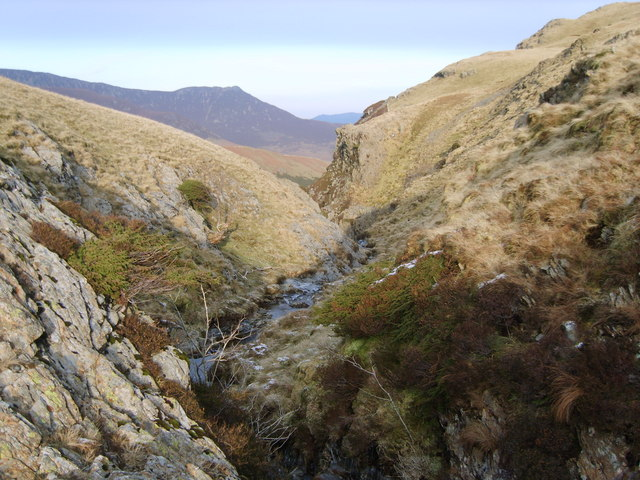
Near Littledale crags

Scope Beck is a minor river in the county of Cumbria in England.

The beck runs through Little Dale, a valley between the mountains of Hindscarth (to the east) and Robinson, in a north north easterly direction.

The beck is fed by Deep Gill, which runs east from Burnt Crags, and two streams from Littledale Edge. Scope Beck itself surrenders its waters to Newlands Beck south of Chapel Bridge.
