= Rowling End =

Hill in Cumbria, England

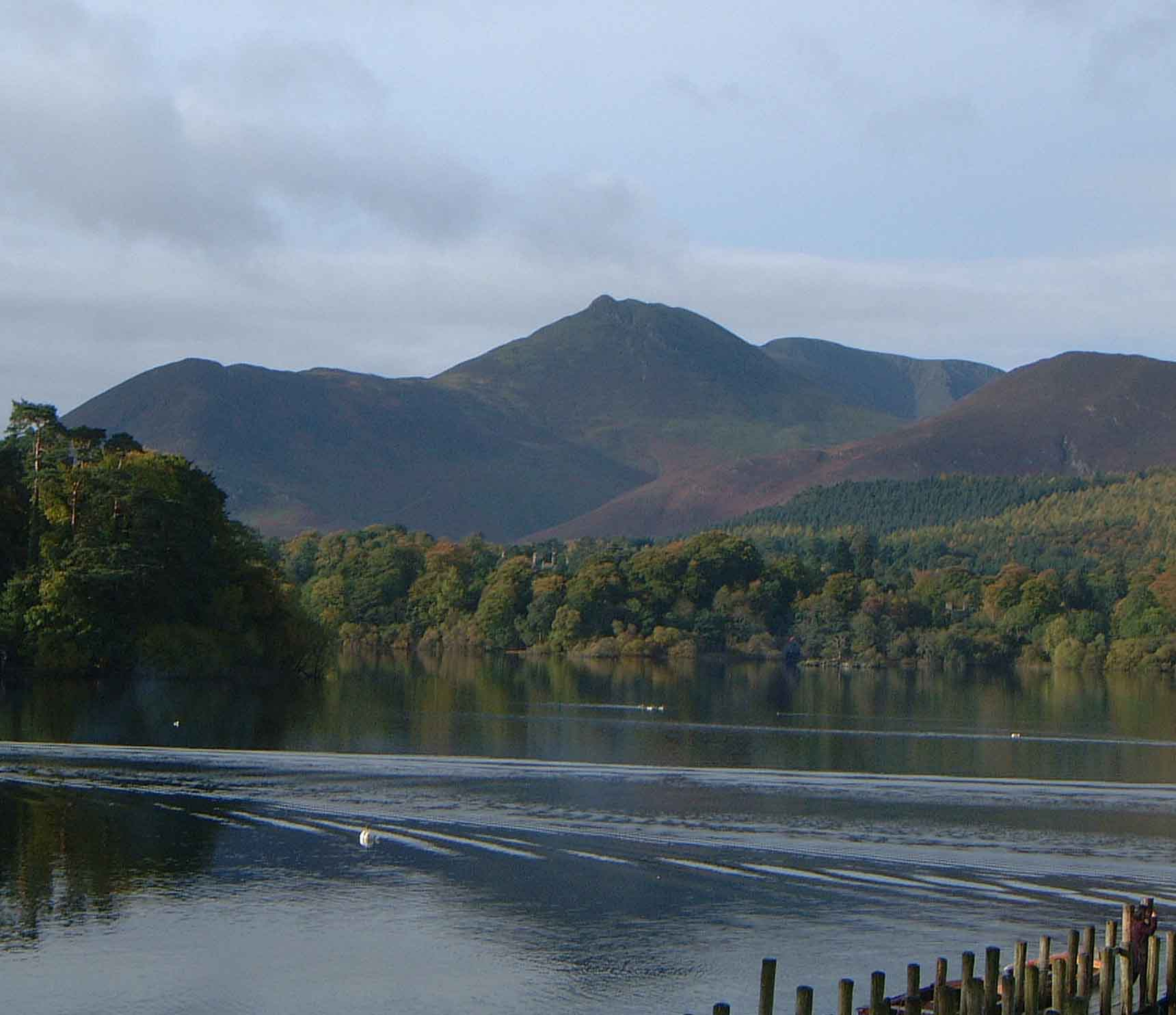
- Rowling End can be seen in front of Causey Pike behind Derwent Water. In summer

Highest point
- Elevation: 433 m (1,421 ft)
- Parent peak: Causey Pike
- Listing: Hewitt, Nuttall
- Coordinates: 54°34′35″N 3°12′41″W

Geography
- Location within the Lake District
- Location: Cumbria, England
- Parent range: Lake District, North Western Fells
- OS grid: NY228206
- Topo map: OS Landrangers 89, 90, Explorer OL4

Rowling End is a peak in the Lake District about 433 meters it is a steep slope leading up towards Causey Pike. It is briefly mentioned in books however they mainly focus on Causey Pike. The summit has a small cairn on it amongst the heather and other shrubs and plants.
