= Hopegill Head =

Fell in Cumbria, England

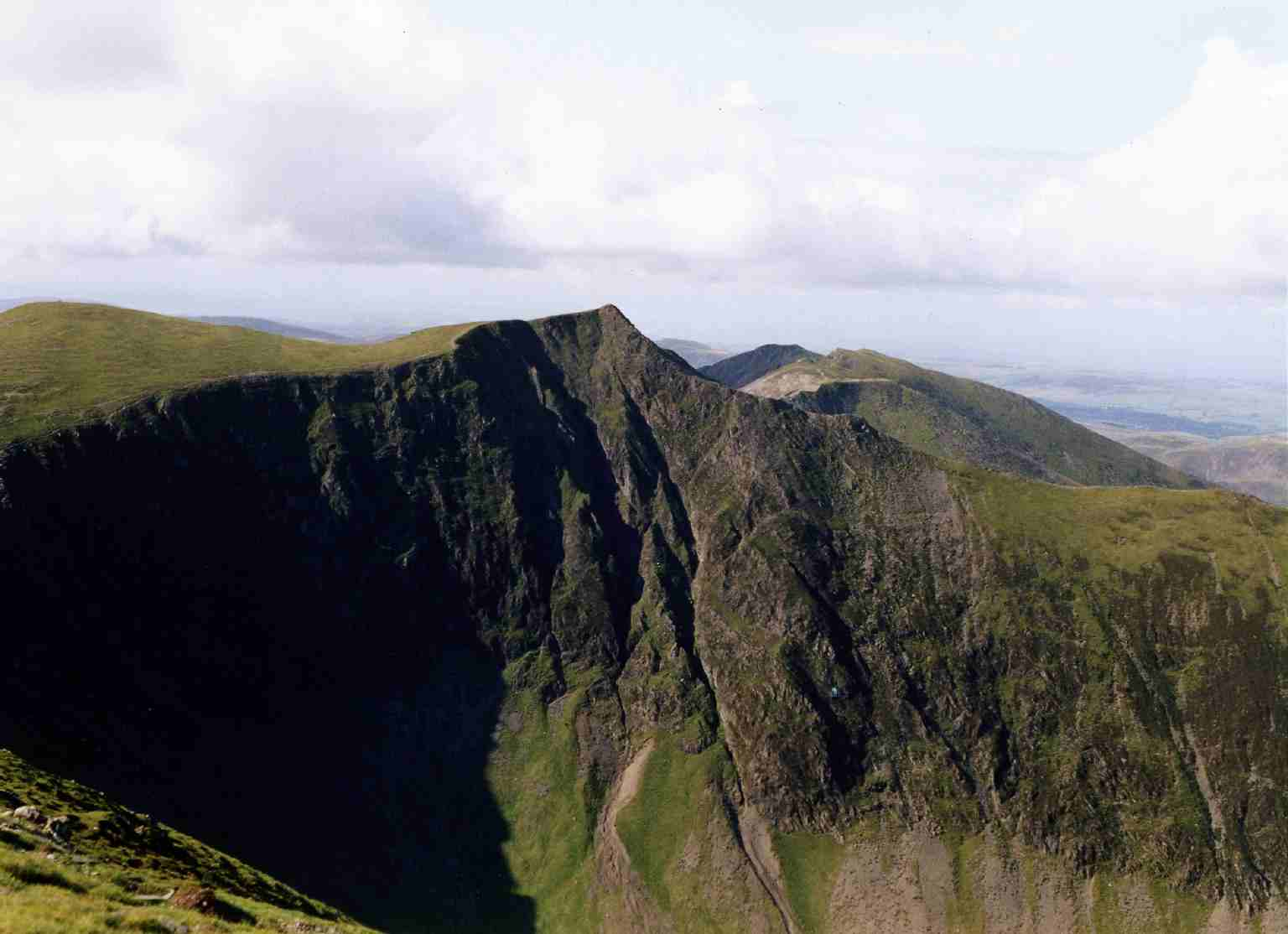
- Hopegill Head seen from Grisedale Pike. Hobcarton Crag is beneath the fell. The grassy hill on the left is Sand Hill.

Highest point
- Elevation: 770 m (2,530 ft)
- Prominence: 97 m (318 ft)
- Parent peak: Grisedale Pike
- Listing: Wainwright, Hewitt, Nuttall
- Coordinates: 54°35′15″N 3°15′46″W

Naming
- English translation: Source of Hope Gill

Geography
- Location within the Lake District Location within the former Allerdale Borough
- Location: Cumbria, England
- Parent range: Lake District, North Western Fells
- OS grid: NY185221
- Topo map: OS Landranger 89, 90, OS Explorer Outdoor Leisure 4

Listed summits of Hopegill Head
Name	Grid ref	Height	Status
Sand Hill	NY187218	756 m (2,480 ft)	Nuttall
Ladyside Pike	NY185227	703 m (2,306 ft)	Nuttall

Hopegill Head is a fell in the English Lake District in Cumbria. It is located nine kilometres (5 1/2 miles) west of the town of Keswick and is well seen from the B5292 road which crosses the Whinlatter Pass.

== Topography ==
Hopegill Head is the middle fell of three fells on a ridge that starts at Braithwaite and goes west for eight kilometres (5 miles) to conclude at the northern end of Crummock Water. The other two fells on the ridge are Grisedale Pike and Whiteside. The fell is often referred to locally as Hobcarton Pike as it stands at the head of Hobcarton Gill. However, the Ordnance Survey have officially named the fell Hopegill Head on maps after Hope Gill, which is another valley that goes north-west from the summit. Hopegill Head reaches a height of 770 metres (2,530 ft) and has two subsidiary summits, Ladyside Pike (703 metres; 2,306 ft) and Sand Hill (756 metres; 2,480 ft) both of which have Nuttall status.

Hopegill Head’s most striking feature is the 130-metre-high (430 ft) cliff of Hobcarton Crag, which drops precipitously to Hobcarton Gill on the fell's north east side. These cliffs are unsuitable for conventional rock climbing because they are made of crumbly Skiddaw Slate but they do provide good winter climbing with the best known routes being Thompson’s Chimney and Cave Route. The crags, which are owned by the National Trust, are the only location in England of Viscaria alpina, the red alpine catchfly.

== Geology ==
The laminated mudstone and siltstone of the Kirkstile Formation predominated, with the underlying greywacke sandstone of the Loweswater Formation outcropping to the north.

== Ascents ==
Hopegill Head can be climbed by various routes. Many people arrive along the ridge from Grisedale Pike or Whiteside but it is also possible to ascend from the Vale of Lorton and from the Whinlatter Pass road by the north west ridge, taking in the subsidiary top of Ladyside Pike. It is also possible to arrive or leave via the Coledale Hause passing over the satellite summit of Sand Hill. This is quite often done as part of the Coledale Round, an 18 kilometre horseshoe walk which takes in the other Coledale fells of Grisedale Pike, Eel Crag, Sail, Scar Crags and Causey Pike.

== Summit ==
The summit of the fell is an exhilarating place, a small pointed peak poised on the edge of Hobcarton Crag giving wide ranging views. The Isle of Man is seen on clear days, as are the Scottish Border hills. To the east the Helvellyn range is well seen.
