= Keskadale Beck =

River in Cumbria, England

Coordinates: 54.5655°N 3.1897°W

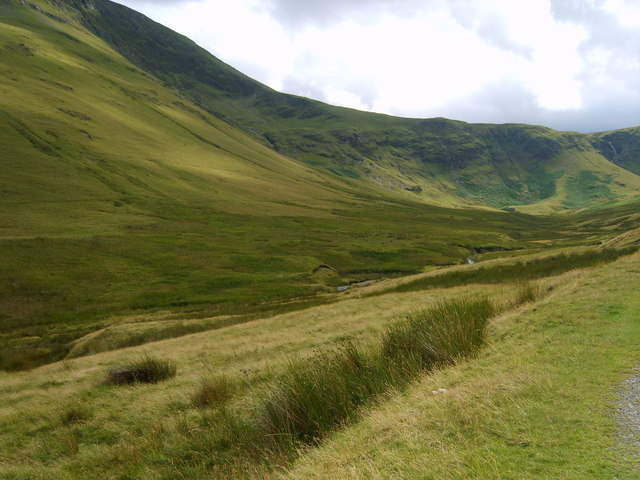
View of Keskadale Beck Valley from the road to Newlands Hause

Keskadale Beck is a minor river of Cumbria, England.

The beck rises at the confluence of High Hole Beck (which rises beneath Robinson Crags) and Moss Beck (from Buttermere Moss). From there, Keskadale Beck flows north east, picking up Dudmanscomb Gill (running north from Robinson). Ill Gill joins near Keskadale Farm.

The beck joins Newlands Beck opposite Little Town.
