= Newlands Church =

Coordinates: 54.5636°N 3.1925°W

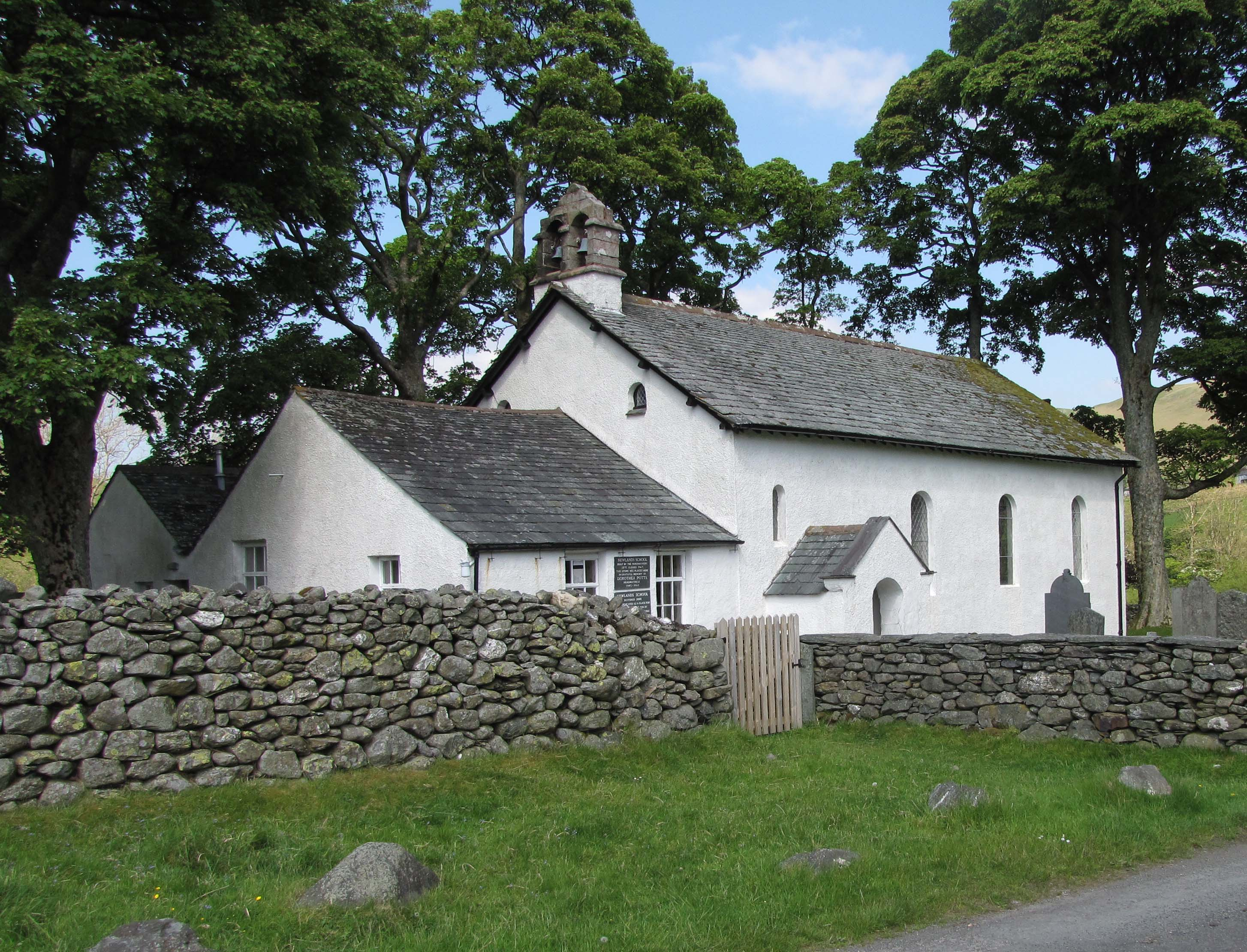
- Newlands Church with the former school building to the left
- Newlands Church
- OS grid reference: NY 22990 19366
- Location: Little Town, Cumbria
- Country: England
- Denomination: Anglican

History
- Status: Church
- Founded: Unknown, but possibly 16th century

Architecture
- Functional status: Active
- Heritage designation: Grade II

Specifications
- Materials: Roughcast

Newlands Church is a 16th-century church situated less than 500 metres west of the hamlet of Little Town, Cumbria, England in the Newlands Valley of the Lake District. Its exact date of origin is unknown, but a map of 1576 shows a "Newlande Chap." on the site.

The church exterior presents white-washed roughcast walls and a green slate roof; the interior displays two stained glass windows, a gallery, and a reading desk and a pulpit dated 1610. Tourists and hillwalkers visit on their way to the fells. The church is a Grade II listed building.

== Location ==
The whitewashed roughcast Church of Newlands lies in open countryside some 500 yards (450 metres) west of the hamlet of Little Town, Cumbria, England near the confluence of Newlands Beck, Scope Beck, and Keskadale Beck in the Lake District National Park and six miles (ten kilometres) by road from Keswick. It is situated in the Newlands Valley, separated from Derwent Water to the east by the summit of Catbells. It is surrounded by the high mountains which encircle the head of the valley.

== History ==
=== Origins ===
The exact date of the origin of Newlands Church is unknown but is believed to be some time in the middle 16th century. Christopher Saxton’s map of 1576 shows a church on the site marked "Newlande Chap.". The church was mentioned again in 1594 when John Mayson of the local farm Stoneycrofte left the sum of 3s 4d to Newlandes Chappell in his will. Due to the effects of the plague of 1558 the church did not have an Incumbent in its early years and it was not until 1610 that Anthony Bragg was installed as the church's first Lay reader. A Lay reader was an unqualified member of the clergy (usually a local person) who could read the services but could not perform christenings, marriages, or Communion, these duties being the bailiwick of the primary priest on his rounds of the valley. Nine Lay readers served the church until 1731, the longest serving being Thomas Birkhead (1654–1690) and John Atkinson (1690–1728).

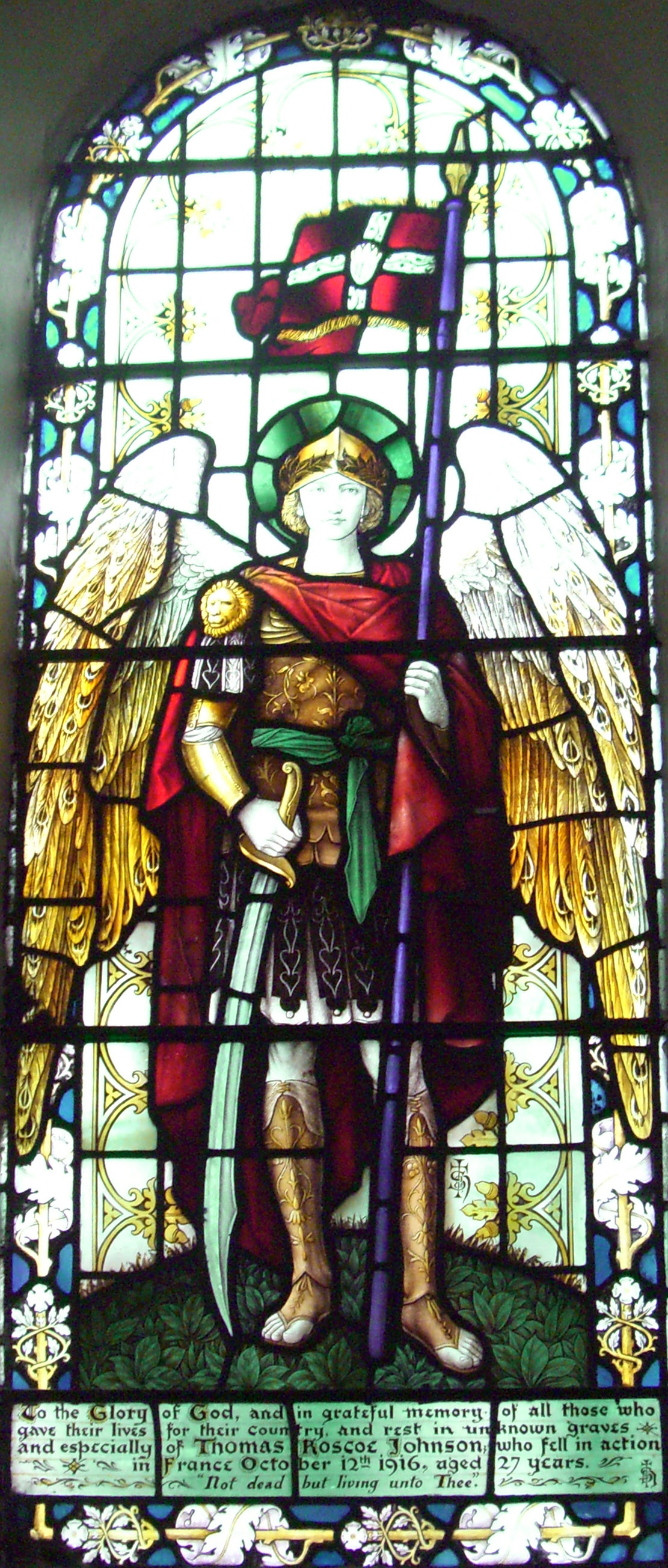
Stained glass window in the south wall depicting St. Michael in armour

=== Curacy ===
In 1731, Joseph Fisher was appointed the church's first Curate and served until 1779. Newlands was one of the poorer clergy with an annual stipend of £2 11s 7d, the lowest in the Diocese of Carlisle. The church received three payments of £200 under the laws of Queen Anne's Bounty in 1748, 1750 and 1757. Ten Curates served in Newlands until 1868. William Parsable served for 32 years (1794–1826) and was known as “Peppery Billy”. He also served as Headmaster at Crosthwaite School in nearby Keswick and was known for his quick temper and firm discipline which put fear into both the congregation and pupils.

=== Rebuilding ===
By the early years of the 1840s, the church was in a rundown state. John Monkhouse became Curate in 1840 and raised funds to rebuild the structure and to add a school. The school was built on the west side of the church at a cost £37 and opened in 1841. A modern plaque outside the school says it was built in 1877 but records confirm its construction in 1841. The rebuilding of the church cost £200 and included a new roof, new windows and an end wall. The height of the building was increased thereby, allowing for the construction of an upstairs Gallery.

=== 1880s to present ===
In 1882, the church received its first vicar, A.C. Forbes, and, in 1885, further renovations were conducted with new pews, new flooring, and a heating system being installed. A slate plaque was put in the north wall to commemorate the re-opening by the Bishop of Carlisle. The graveyard was extended in 1926. The school remained open until 1967 when the pupils were transferred to Braithwaite Primary School. The school room fell into disrepair after closure but was refurbished in the late 1990s and reopened on 9 April 2000 by the Bishop of Carlisle as a place for quiet reflection. Today, twice monthly Sunday services are conducted, and the church is open during the day for visitors and hill walkers to call in as they pass on their way to the fells. The church is a Grade II listed building.

== Interior ==
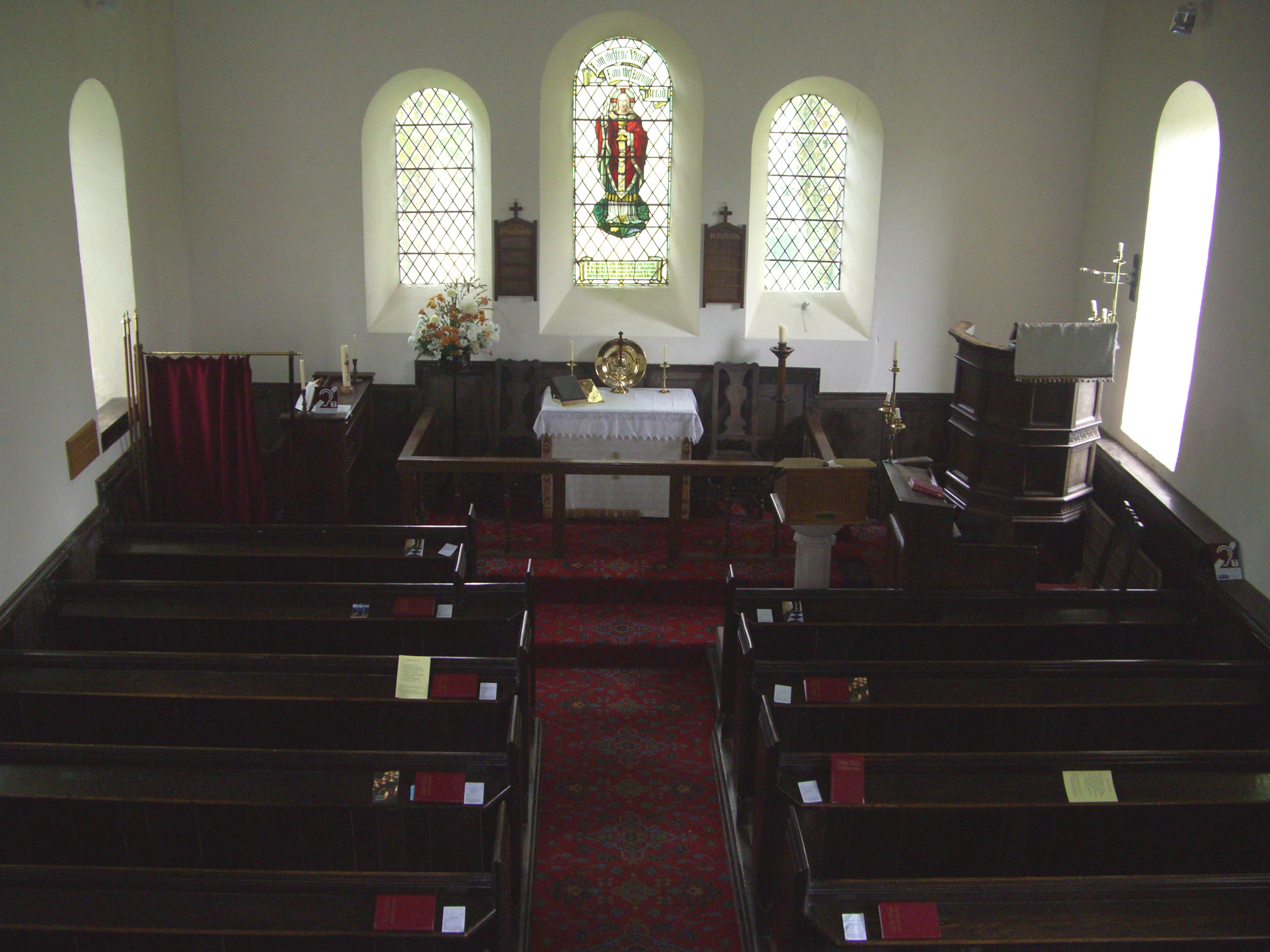
Interior from the Gallery

At the east end of the church is a reader's desk and pulpit which both date to 1610. The sandstone and wood lectern dates to 1937. The wooden top of the lectern can be removed to allow the sandstone plinth to be used as a baptismal font.

The stained-glass east window by Abbot & Co. of Lancaster dates to 1845 and was paid for by local residents to commemorate the rebuilding of the church. It displays Christ holding the wine and bread beneath the words, "I am the true vine, I am the living bread". A stained glass in the middle south wall window (the only other in the church) by Shrigley and Hunt displays St Michael in armour with a lion's head on his shoulder. The window is a memorial to Thomas Roscre Johnston, killed in World War I.

A slate memorial in the north wall commemorates the re-opening of the church by the Bishop of Carlisle on 4 June 1885. There are memorials to benefactors Moses and Sarah Mawson of Emerald Bank, and to the Clark brothers (slain in action during World War II). The offertory box near the door is a memorial to John Bulman. A large wooden armorial with the Royal Coat of Arms of George II, dated 1737, hangs on the south wall.

== Literary connections ==
The poet William Wordsworth and his daughter Dora visited Newlands Church in May 1826 while on a walking tour of the fells from Rydal Mount. Wordsworth was so impressed by his first glimpse of the church through half-opened leaves that he was prompted to write in his poem, "To May":

"How delicate the leafy veil
Through which yon house of God
Gleams, mid the peace of this deep dale
By few but shepherds trod!"

In the summer of 1901, children's author and illustrator Beatrix Potter was staying at nearby Lingholm and often had the Vicar of Newlands Church and his family to tea. The vicar's young daughter Lucie Carr played with Potter's pet hedgehog during these visits and inspired the character of Lucie in The Tale of Mrs. Tiggy-Winkle (1905). In the illustration of Lucie running along a path, Potter depicted the church in a grove of trees.
