= Above Derwent =

Civil parish in Cumbria, England

Coordinates: 54°34′41″N 3°11′56″W

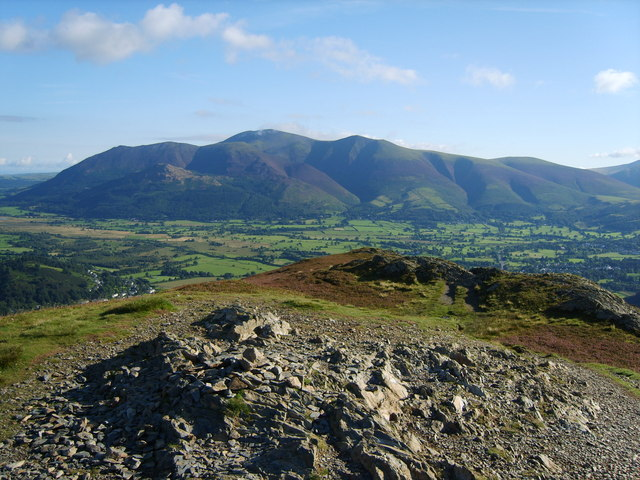
- The summit of Barrow

- Location in Allerdale, Cumbria Location within Cumbria
- Area: 55.0472 km^{2} (21.2538 sq mi)
- Population: 1,198 (2011)
  - Density: 22/km^{2} (57/sq mi)
- OS grid reference: NY231236
- Civil parish: Above Derwent
- Unitary authority: Cumberland
- Ceremonial county: Cumbria
- Region: North West
- Country: England
- Sovereign state: United Kingdom
- Post town: Keswick
- Postcode district: CA12
- Police: Cumbria
- Fire: Cumbria
- Ambulance: North West
- UK Parliament: Penrith and Solway

Above Derwent is a civil parish in Cumbria, England, to the west of Derwentwater and Keswick. It lies entirely within the Lake District National Park.

At the 2011 Census the parish had a population of 1,198 in 514 households, a small decrease from the 2001 figure of 1,207 living in 516 households.

The area of the civil parish is 5,505 hectares (13,600 acres; 21.25 sq mi).

== History ==
Above Derwent CP comprised the ancient townships of Braithwaite, Coledale or Portinscale, and Thornthwaite, and the chapelry of Newlands".

The population, according to the 1811 Census, was 668, "rising to 1115 in 1851 and then stable throughout the 19th Century".

== Topography ==
The parish is bounded to the east by Derwentwater, the River Derwent and Bassenthwaite Lake, it includes sections of both lakes. To the West and South, the parish is bounded by the summit of Lord's Seat, the Whinlatter Pass, the summits of Grisedale Pike and Crag Hill, the Newlands Pass, and the summits of Robinson and Catbells.The parish comprises relatively low level land alongside and between both lakes, together with the Newlands Valley, and large areas of the surrounding fells. It includes the settlements of Braithwaite, Thornthwaite, Portinscale, Stair and Little Town. The A66 primary route enters the CP at its most northerly point, Beck Wythop. The most southerly point of the CP is about 1 km south-south-east of the summit of Dale Head, at grid reference NY228144.

== Governance ==
Above Derwent has a parish council, the lowest tier of local government in England.

For Local Government purposes it is in the Cumberland unitary authority area.

Above Derwent was previously in the electoral ward of Derwent Valley. The total population of this ward taken at the 2011 Census was 1,615.

The parish is within the Penrith and Solway constituency of the UK Parliament.

== See also ==
- Listed buildings in Above Derwent
