= Listed buildings in Bewaldeth and Snittlegarth =

Bewaldeth and Snittlegarth is a civil parish in the Cumberland district in Cumbria, England. It contains eight listed buildings that are recorded in the National Heritage List for England. All the listed buildings are designated at Grade II, the lowest of the three grades, which is applied to "buildings of national importance and special interest". It contains the settlement of Bewaldeth, and is almost entirely rural. All the listed buildings are houses and associated structures, farmhouses and farm buildings.

== Buildings ==
Name and location	Photograph	Date	Notes
High House and farm buildings 54.72398°N 3.21685°W	—	1669	The farmhouse, stables, byres and barn are in rubble with green slate roofs, and they form a U-shaped plan. The house has two storeys and two bays, and contains sash windows. The doorway has a chamfered surround, a shaped inscribed lintel, and a hood mould. The farm buildings have various openings, and include a lean-to dairy with a bellcote. Inside the house is an inglenook.
High Bewaldeth Cottage and stable 54.69666°N 3.20600°W	—	Late 17th century	Originally a farmhouse and a stable, later converted into a house and a garage, the building is in roughcast with a green slate roof. The house has two storeys and three bays, with a single-bay stable to the right. The windows are sashes.
Snittlegarth and adjoining stables 54.72998°N 3.21396°W		Early 18th century	The farmhouse, that was extended in 1801, and the adjoining stables are in limestone with green slate roofs. The house has two storeys and five bays with a two-bay extension, all on a chamfered plinth. It has flush quoins, eaves modillions, and sash windows. On the front is a prostyle porch with Ionic columns, triglyphs and a dentilled cornice. At the rear is a Venetian stair window. The stable is at right angles and its openings include doorways, sash windows, loft openings, and a partly blocked carriage entrance with an alternate-block surround. Against the wall is a mounting block.
Binsey View; 54.70124°N 3.22537°W	—	1760	A roughcast farmhouse with a green slate roof, in two storeys and with two bays. The doorway has an architrave and a dated lintel. In the ground floor the windows are mullioned, and in the upper floor there are horizontal sliding sash windows.
Low Garth and Crag View; 54.70165°N 3.22710°W	—	Late 18th century	Originally a farmhouse incorporating earlier material, it was extended in the 19th century, and later divided into two dwellings. The house is in rubble on a chamfered plinth, with angle pilasters and a modillioned cornice, and it has a green slate roof. There are two storeys, a central block of three bays, and flanking lower single-bay wings. The doorway has a Tuscan doorcase and a fanlight, and the windows on the front are sashes. On the rear are mullioned windows, a round-headed staircase window, and a doorway with an architrave.
Barns and byres, Low Garth and Crag View; 54.70186°N 3.22696°W	—	Late 18th century	The barns incorporate some earlier material, and are in rubble with sandstone dressings and a green slate roof. They have two storeys, and are in a cruciform plan, with a long axis and two side wings. They contain doorways, a cart entrance with a segmental head, and windows, some of which are mullioned and others are casements.
Garden wall and gate piers, Low Garth and Crag View; 54.70180°N 3.22751°W	—	Late 18th century	The garden wall and gate piers are in stone. The piers have a square plan with pyramidal roofs.
The Lodge; 54.73268°N 3.21671°W	—	1801	The lodge to Snittlegarth is in limestone with sandstone dressings, including quoins, and has a green hipped slate roof. It has one storey, a hexagonal plan, and a two-bay front. The windows are sashes.
