= Causey Pike =

Mountain in Cumbria, England

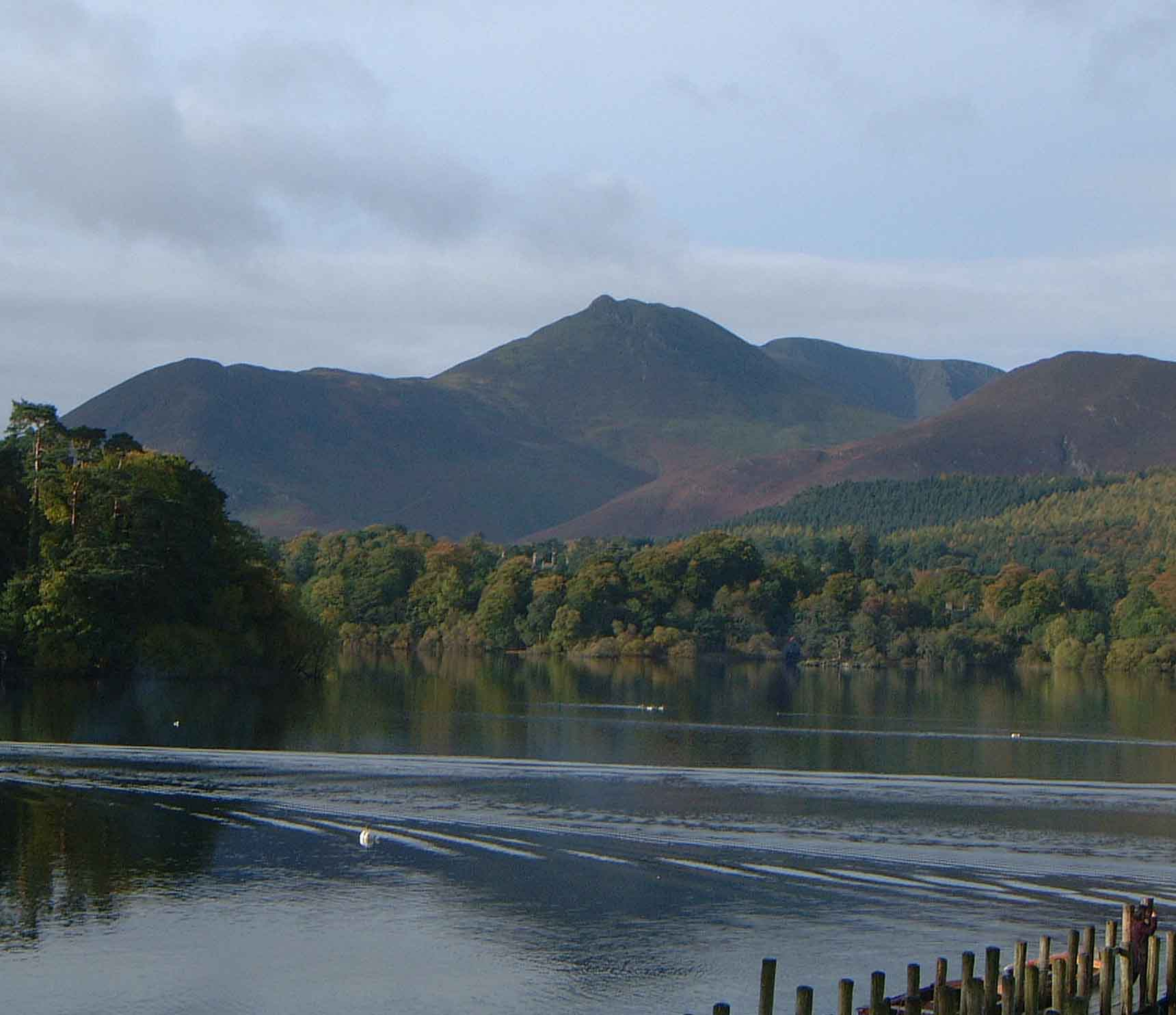
- Causey Pike with its distinctive bump seen from Derwentwater

Highest point
- Elevation: 637 m (2,090 ft)
- Prominence: 40 m (130 ft)
- Parent peak: Scar Crags
- Listing: Hewitt, Nuttall, Wainwright
- Coordinates: 54°34′35″N 3°12′41″W

Geography
- Location within the Lake District
- Location: Cumbria, England
- Parent range: Lake District, North Western Fells
- OS grid: NY218208
- Topo map: OS Landrangers 89, 90, Explorer OL4

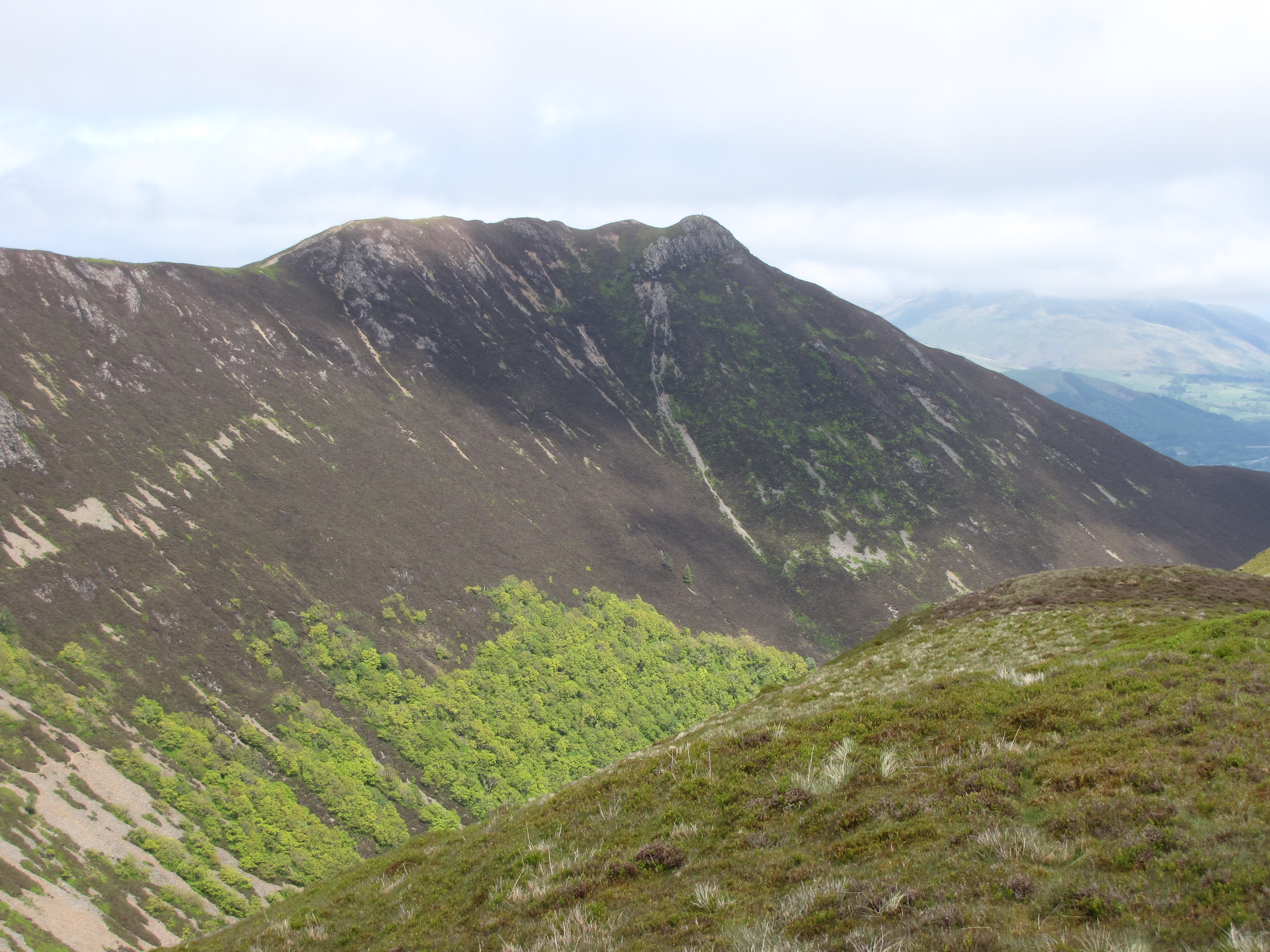
Causey Pike seen from Ard Crags, one km to the SW.

Causey Pike is a fell in the English Lake District. It is situated in the Newlands Valley, 5 kilometres (3 miles) south-west of the town of Keswick. Even though it has a modest height of 637 metres (2,090 ft) it is one of the most distinctive fells when viewed from the Derwent Water and Keswick area due to its distinguishing summit "knobble" which catches the eye. The fell is one of 214 fells described by Alfred Wainwright in his series of Pictorial Guides to the Lakeland Fells: Causey Pike features in Book Six, The North Western Fells.

== Topography ==
The North Western Fells occupy the area between the rivers Derwent and Cocker, a broadly oval swathe of hilly country, elongated on a north–south axis. Two roads cross from east to west, dividing the fells into three convenient groups. The central sector, rising between Whinlatter Pass and Newlands Pass, includes Causey Pike. The highest ground in the North Western Fells is an east–west ridge in this central sector, beginning with Grasmoor above Crummock Water and then gradually descending eastwards over Crag Hill, Sail, Scar Crags and Causey Pike.

Causey Pike is separated from Barrow and Outerside to the north by Stonycroft Gill. Southward across Rigg Beck is Ard Crags. Causey Pike has a long blunt-ended shoulder running eastward to the Newlands Valley, dropping steeply from its terminus at Rowling End.

== Geology ==
The entire hill is formed from Ordovician-age rocks assigned to the Skiddaw Group. The summit ridge and northern slopes are composed of the laminated mudstone and siltstone of the Kirkstile Formation, whilst the summit knobble and southern slopes are formed from the Buttermere Formation, an olistostrome of disrupted, sheared and folded mudstone, siltstone and sandstone. The eastern spur and Rowling End reveal the large olistoliths of greywacke sandstone of the Robinson Member, a sub-unit of the Buttermere Formation.

== Ascents ==
The direct ascent of the fell is usually started from the Newlands valley at Stonycroft where there is some car parking space; this route is steep at the beginning and the end with an easier section in the middle, the final 20 metres (65 ft) of ascent being a rocky scramble. An easier and longer alternative from the same starting point goes by an old track which used to serve the cobalt mine on the slopes of Scar Crags, this approaches the fell "from the back" reaching Sail Pass and then crossing the summit of Scar Crags before attaining Causey Pike. The fell is also part of the horseshoe walk known as the Coledale Round which is usually started at the village of Braithwaite just west of Keswick (but can also be started in the Newlands Valley) and includes the additional fells of Grisedale Pike, Hopegill Head, Grasmoor, Eel Crag, Sail and Scar Crags. It is a strenuous 11-mile (18 km) ridge walk with over 4,000 foot (1,200 m) of ascent.

== Summit ==
The summit of the fell is unique: it is a narrow ridge with the highest point being on the "knobble" but with four other smaller bumps of almost equal height further on. The scree slopes around the summit have yielded some fossils: trilobites, trace fossils and graptolites are found on rare occasions. The view from the summit is extensive with Derwentwater, the Newlands valley, Skiddaw, Blencathra and the Helvellyn range seen very well.

== Protection ==
Causey Pike is within Buttermere Fells Site of Special Scientific Interest. The land surface of Causey Pike mountain is owned by the National Trust. An area of unnamed woodland clings to the hillside on the southern (Rigg Beck) side of the hill. It lies at a height of around 400 metres and is 5.5 hectares (13.59 acres) in size.

== Fell race ==
There is an annual Causey Pike fell race which takes place in March; it starts and finishes at Stair in the Newlands Valley and has a distance of 4 1/2 miles (7 km) with 542 metres (1,778 ft) of climbing. It climbs the fell directly via Ellas Crag and returns via the mine track in Stonycroft Gill. The course record for men is held by Simon Booth at 32 minutes and 14 seconds, while the women's record is held by Lizzie Adams at 37 minutes and 33 seconds.
