= Bewaldeth and Snittlegarth =

Civil parish in Cumbria, England

Coordinates: 54.702°N 3.226°W

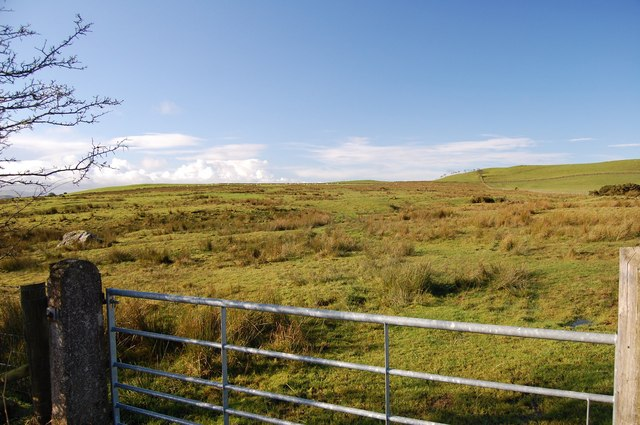
- The site of Caer Mote Roman Fort

- Location in Allerdale, Cumbria Location within Cumbria
- OS grid reference: NY210348
- Civil parish: Bewaldeth and Snittlegarth
- Unitary authority: Cumberland
- Ceremonial county: Cumbria
- Region: North West
- Country: England
- Sovereign state: United Kingdom
- Post town: COCKERMOUTH
- Postcode district: CA13
- Dialling code: 017687
- Police: Cumbria
- Fire: Cumbria
- Ambulance: North West
- UK Parliament: Penrith and Solway

Bewaldeth and Snittlegarth is a civil parish in Cumbria, England, historically part of Cumberland. It lies north of Bassenthwaite Lake, in the Lake District and near its northern edge.

According to the 2001 census it had a population of 40 who live in 1,534 acres (621 ha). At the 2011 Census it was measured that the population was still less than 100.

According to Bulmer's History & Directory Of Cumberland (1901); "Snittlegarth ... is supposed to have been formerly a village of considerable magnitude. The word "Snittlegarth" is thought to signify an enclosure".

== Governance ==
Bewaldeth and Snittlegarth is part of the parliamentary constituency of Penrith and Solway.

For Local Government purposes it is in the Cumberland Unitary Authority area.

There is no parish council, only an annual parish meeting.

== See also ==
- Listed buildings in Bewaldeth and Snittlegarth
