= Stair, Cumbria =

Village in Cumbria, England

Coordinates: 54.5810°N 3.1821°W

Stair
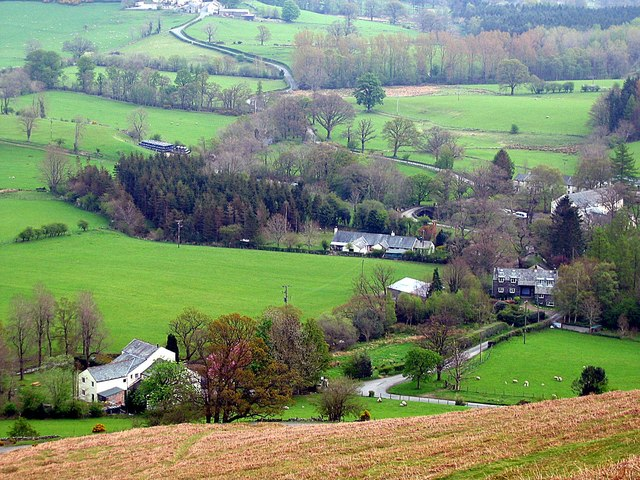
- The village of Stair

- Location in Allerdale, Cumbria Location within Cumbria
- OS grid reference: NY236212
- Civil parish: Above Derwent
- Unitary authority: Cumberland
- Ceremonial county: Cumbria
- Region: North West
- Country: England
- Sovereign state: United Kingdom
- Post town: KESWICK
- Postcode district: CA12
- Dialling code: 017687
- Police: Cumbria
- Fire: Cumbria
- Ambulance: North West
- UK Parliament: Penrith and Solway

Stair is a village in Cumbria, England. It is situated in the Newlands Valley, to the west of Derwent Water and within the Lake District National Park. It is some 4 miles (6.4 km) by road from Keswick.

For administrative purposes, Stair lies within the civil parish of Above Derwent, the unitary authority of Cumberland, and the ceremonial county of Cumbria. It is within the Penrith and Solway constituency of the United Kingdom Parliament.

== Gallery ==
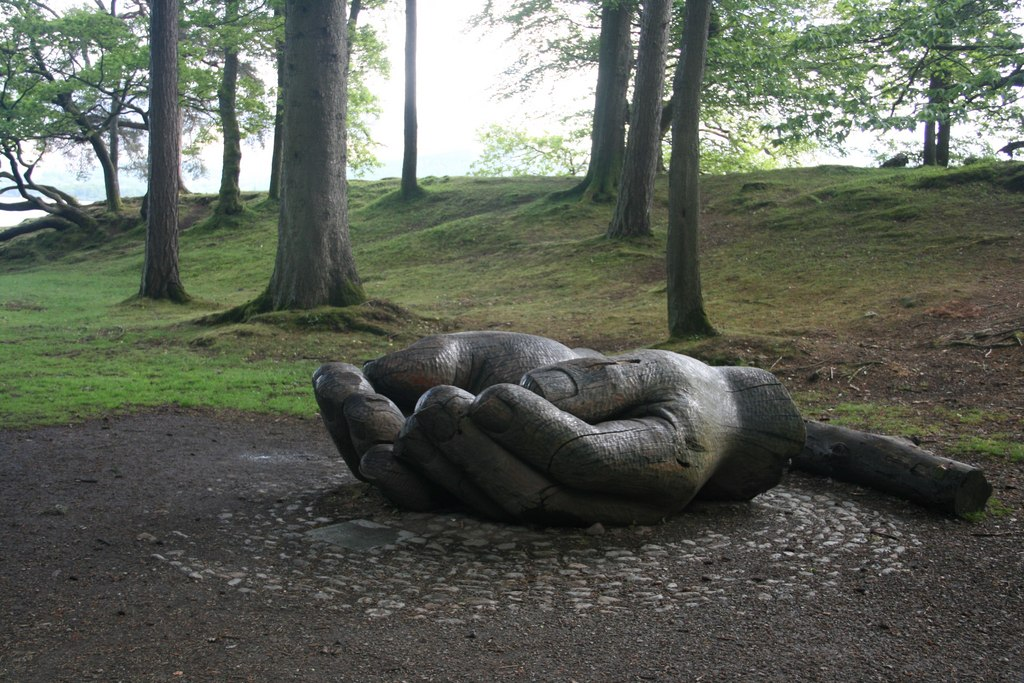
Entrust in Brandelhow Park, near to Stair, Cumbria. This wooden sculpture of cupped hands commemorates the centenary of the National Trust's first ever land purchase, 108 acres of the Brandlehow estate.
