= Barrow (Lake District) =

Fell in the English Lake District

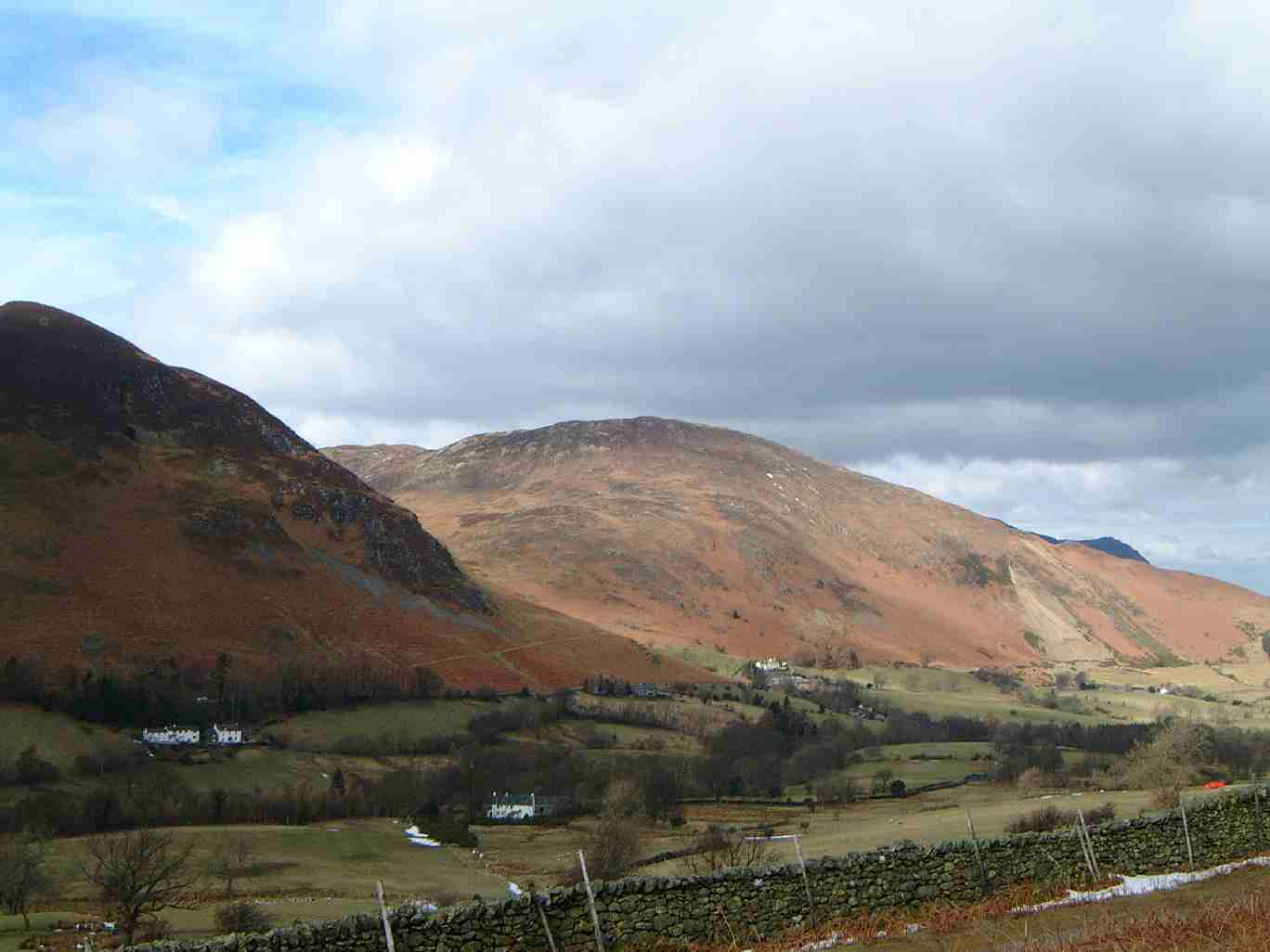
- Barrow seen from the Newlands Valley; note the light-coloured fans of mining spoil

Highest point
- Elevation: 455 m (1,493 ft)
- Prominence: c. 60 m (197 ft)
- Parent peak: Outerside
- Listing: Wainwright
- Coordinates: 54°35′09″N 3°11′49″W

Geography
- Location within the Lake District
- Location: Cumbria, England
- Parent range: Lake District, North Western Fells
- OS grid: NY226218
- Topo map: OS Landranger 89, 90 OS Explorer 4

Barrow is a small fell in the English Lake District in the county of Cumbria which reaches a height of 455 metres (1,494 feet). It is in the Newlands Valley 2.5 miles (4 km) south-west of Keswick. Although comparatively small in height, Barrow commands an all-round view, with the vales of Keswick and Newlands being visible. The name of the fell originates from the Anglo Saxon language meaning a hill or long ridge.

== Topography ==
Barrow is a slender ridge climbing south-west from Braithwaite. At the summit it turns due west across the depression of Barrow Door, diverted by the valley of Stonycroft Gill. Beyond the col are Stile End and Outerside. The valley of Coledale lies to the north-west and Newlands Beck forms the eastern boundary.

== Ascents ==
Ascents of the fell are usually started from either the Newlands Valley or Braithwaite, both providing a short ramble which can be combined with the adjoining higher fell of Outerside. The climb from Newlands starts at the hamlet of Stair and utilises an old mine road up Stonycroft Gill up to a height of 350 metres (1,148 feet) before veering back east to attain the summit. There are two paths from Braithwaite; one follows the northern ridge of the fell while the other approaches up the valley of Barrow Gill.

== Geology ==
Barrow is composed of the laminated mudstone and siltstone of the Kirkstile Formation, typical of the Skiddaw group. A band of greywacke sandstone runs along the eastern flanks.

Like many of the fells in the Newlands Valley, Barrow has been extensively mined for lead in the past, the spoil heaps are extensive and sweep down to the road at the eastern foot of the hill. The spoil is quite light in colour and is clearly visible from afar. Barrow mine first opened in the 17th century and closed in 1888. The remaining spoil heaps are said to be in a state of continual slight movement and it is possible to hear a small rustle as the spoil slides down the hill. Another noteworthy topographical feature is the ravine of Barrow Gill, which appears on the Braithwaite side of the fell, the Gill is deep and extensive and seems out of proportion to the small stream that it accommodates.

== Summit ==
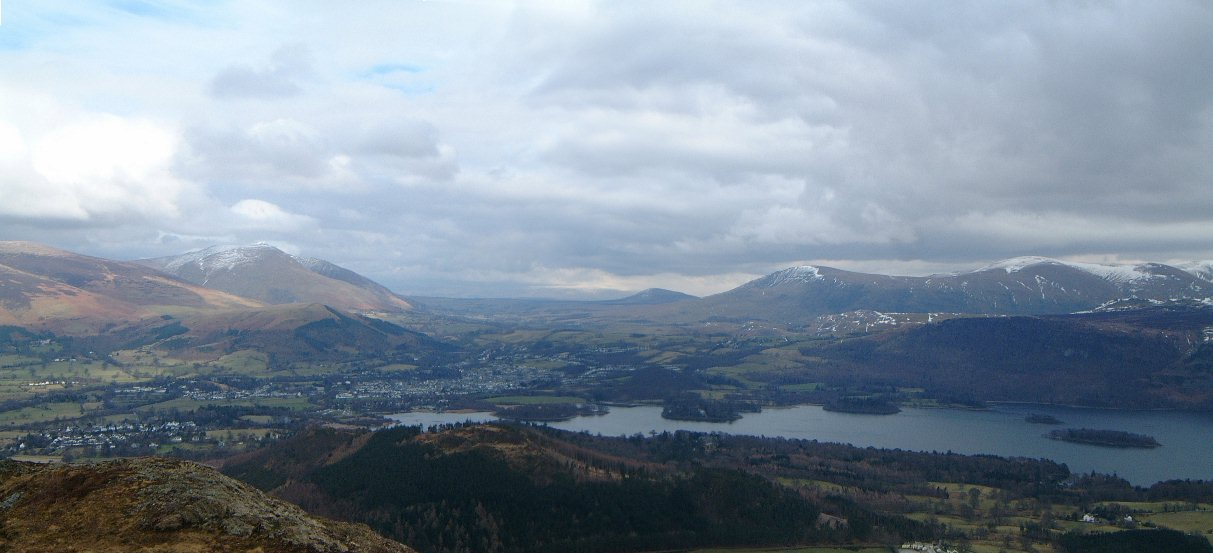
The view easterly from the summit takes in Derwentwater and the vale of Keswick.

A small cairn on grass marks the summit, with heather surrounding the top on all sides. The view takes in the surrounding higher North Western Fells, together with the Helvellyn range across Derwentwater and Skiddaw standing above Keswick.
