= Little Town, Cumbria =

Hamlet in Cumbria, England

Coordinates: 54.5657°N 3.1852°W

Little Town
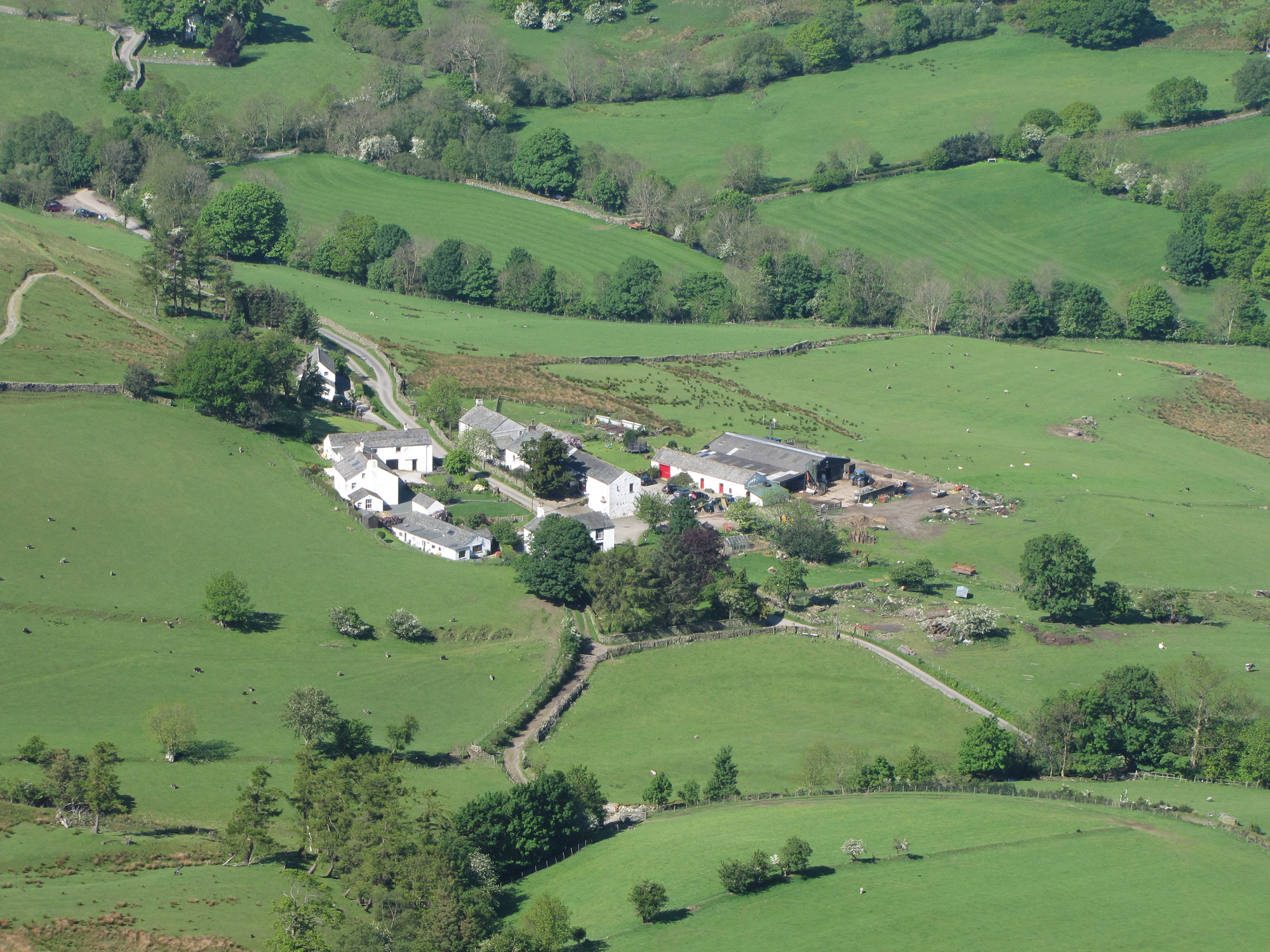
- Little Town seen from Catbells. Newlands Church is just visible at the top left edge of the photograph.

- Location in Allerdale, Cumbria Location within Cumbria
- OS grid reference: NY233196
- Civil parish: Above Derwent
- Unitary authority: Cumberland
- Ceremonial county: Cumbria
- Region: North West
- Country: England
- Sovereign state: United Kingdom
- Post town: Keswick
- Postcode district: CA15
- Dialling code: 01768
- Police: Cumbria
- Fire: Cumbria
- Ambulance: North West
- UK Parliament: Penrith and Solway
- Website: Above Derwent

Little Town is a hamlet in the civil parish of Above Derwent, in the Cumberland district of Cumbria, England. It is in the Penrith and Solway constituency of the United Kingdom Parliament.

Little Town is in the Lake District National Park. It is in the Newlands Valley, separated from Derwent Water to the east by the summit of Catbells. The hamlet is about 5 1/2 miles (9 kilometres) by road from Keswick.

== History ==
The tiny 16th-century Newlands Church is about 500 yards (450 metres) west of Little Town. William Wordsworth visited this church in 1826 while on a walking tour of the fells, and that he was so impressed by his first glimpse of the church through half-opened leaves that he wrote a stanza in his poem To May.

Children's author and illustrator Beatrix Potter set The Tale of Mrs. Tiggy-Winkle (1905) in and around Little Town.
