= Thornthwaite =

Village in Cumbria, England

Coordinates: 54.618133°N 3.203974°W

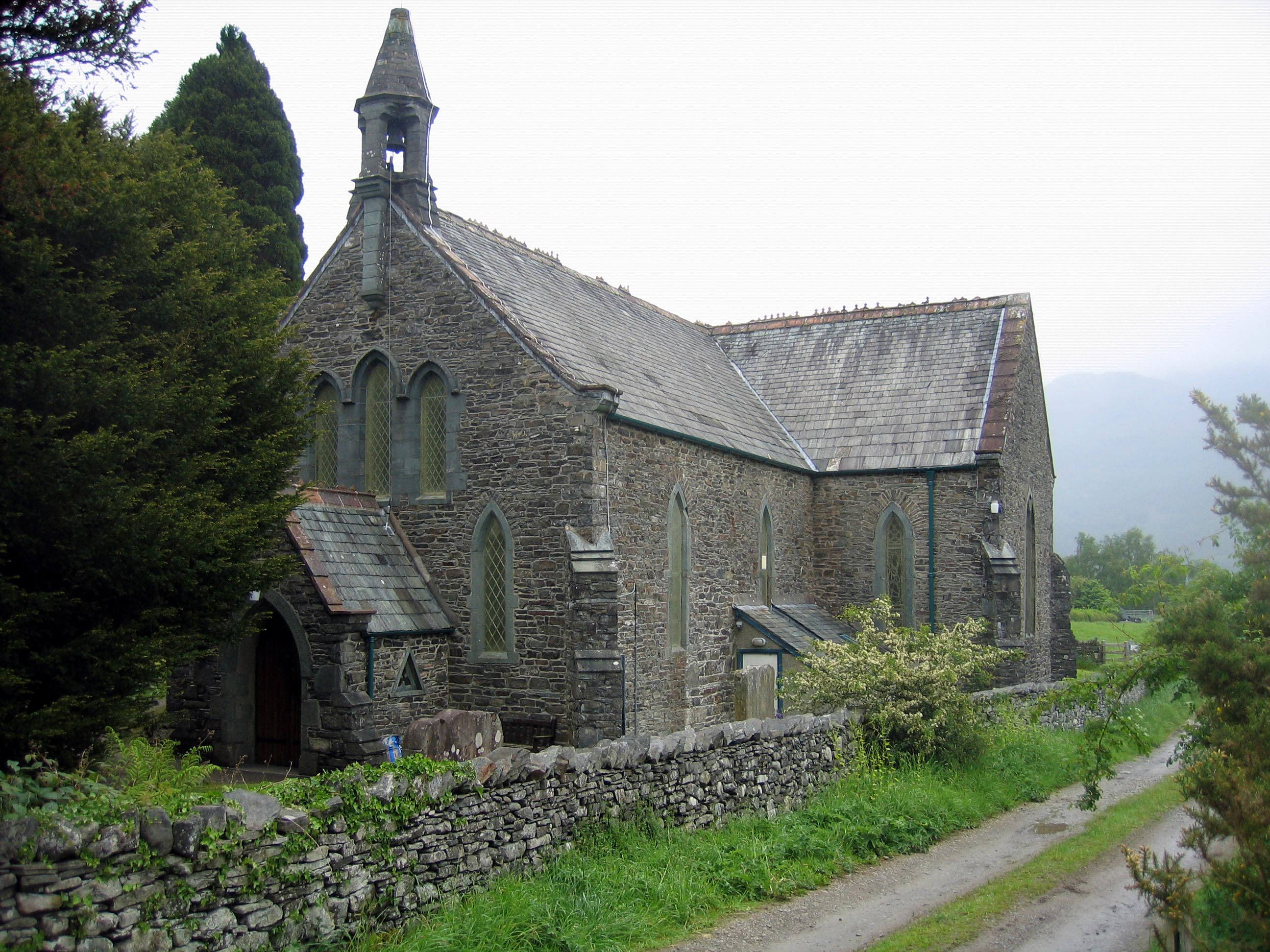
- St. Mary's Church, Thornthwaite

- Location in Allerdale, Cumbria Location within Cumbria
- OS grid reference: NY222254
- Civil parish: Above Derwent
- Unitary authority: Cumberland
- Ceremonial county: Cumbria
- Region: North West
- Country: England
- Sovereign state: United Kingdom
- Post town: KESWICK
- Postcode district: CA12
- Dialling code: 017687
- Police: Cumbria
- Fire: Cumbria
- Ambulance: North West
- UK Parliament: Penrith and Solway

Thornthwaite is a village in Cumbria, England. Historically in Cumberland, it is just off the A66 road, south of Bassenthwaite Lake and within the Lake District National Park. It is 3.5 miles (5.6 km) by road from Keswick. In 1861 the township had a population of 153. The place-name contains thwaite ("clearing").

For administrative purposes, Stair lies within the civil parish of Above Derwent, the unitary authority of Cumberland, and the ceremonial county of Cumbria. It is within the Penrith and Solway constituency of the United Kingdom Parliament.

St Mary's Church is located a short distance east of the village. It was built in 1831, replacing an earlier church of c.1760 on the same site. The Church is a Grade II listed building.
