= Grisedale Pike =

Mountain in the English Lake District, Cumbria, England

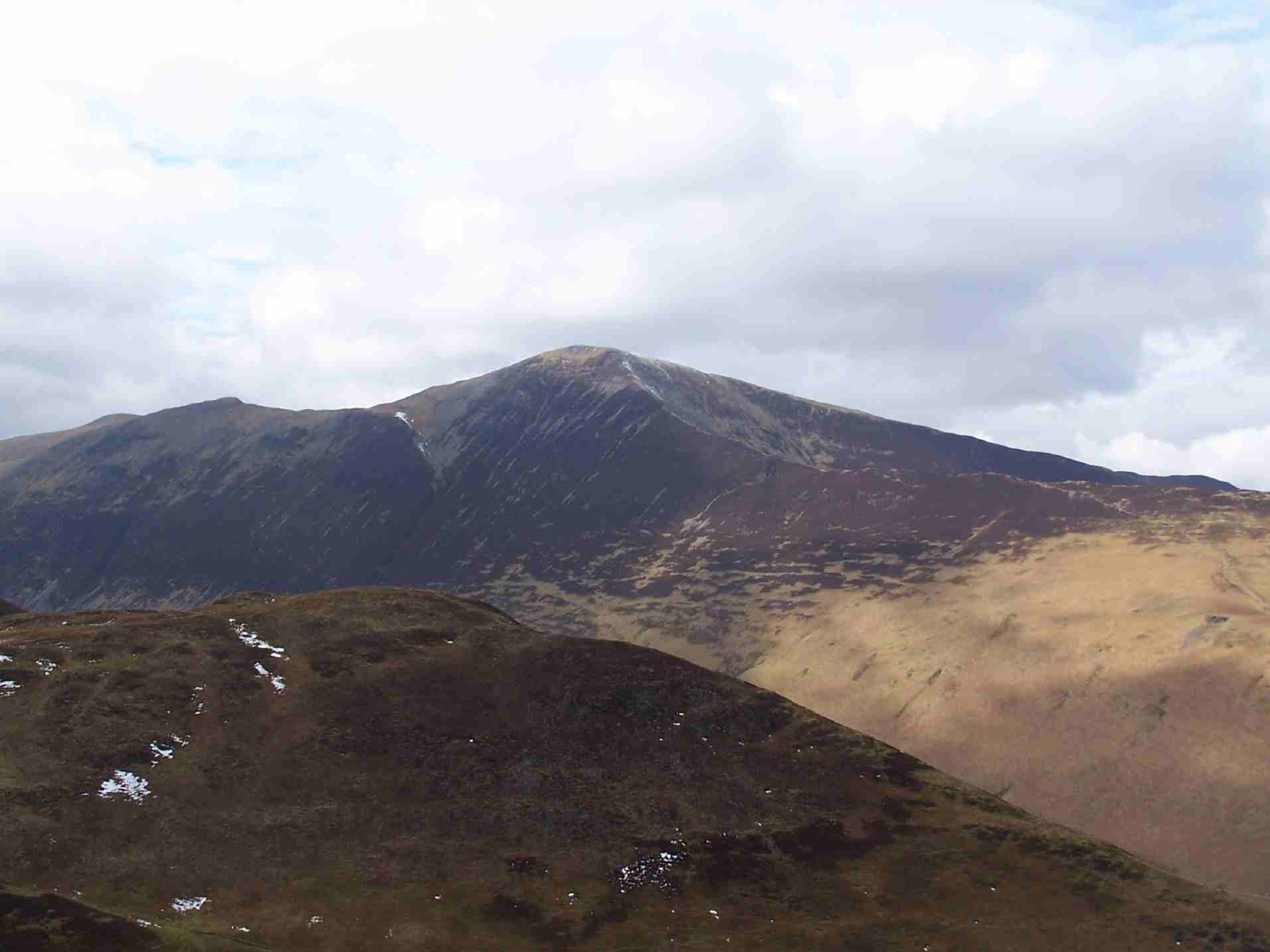
- Grisedale Pike seen from the fell of Barrow, 3 km to the east

Highest point
- Elevation: 791 m (2,595 ft)
- Prominence: c. 189 m
- Parent peak: Grasmoor
- Listing: Marilyn, Hewitt, Wainwright, Nuttall
- Coordinates: 54°35′31″N 3°14′28″W

Geography
- Location within the Lake District Location within the former Allerdale Borough
- Location: Cumbria, England
- Parent range: Lake District, North Western Fells
- OS grid: NY198225

Listed summits of Grisedale Pike
Name	Grid ref	Height	Status
Hobcarton Crag	NY193220	739 m (2,425 ft)	Hewitt, Nuttall
Hobcarton End	NY194235	634 m (2,080 ft)	Nuttall

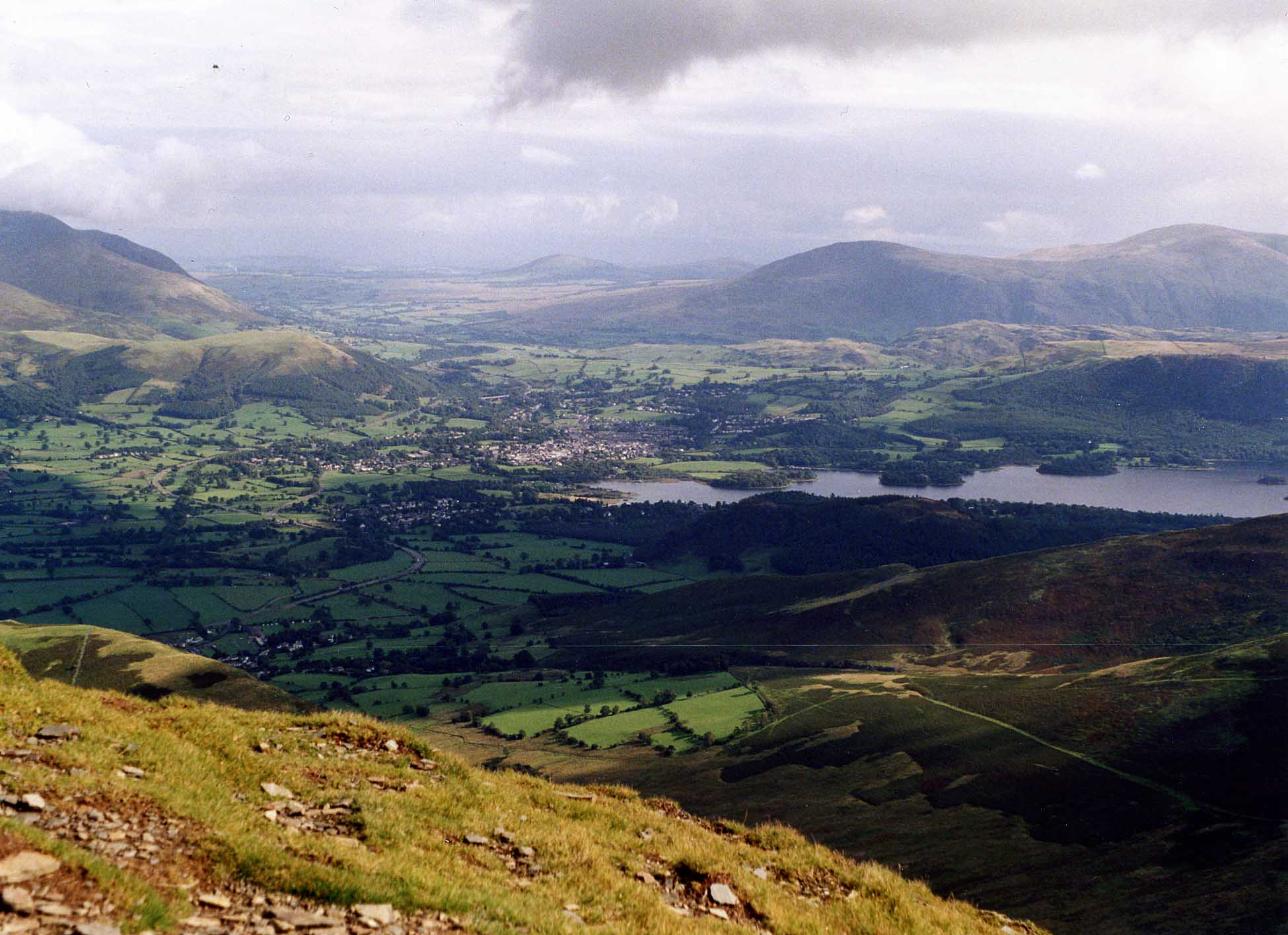
The view east from the summit takes in the Vale of Keswick and the head of Derwentwater.

Grisedale Pike is a fell in the Lake District, Cumbria, England, situated 4 1/2 miles (7 kilometres) west of the town of Keswick in the north-western sector of the national park. At a height of 791 metres (2,595 feet) it is the 40th-highest Wainwright in the Lake District; it also qualifies as a Hewitt, Marilyn and Nuttall. Grisedale Pike presents a striking appearance when viewed from the east, particularly from the vicinity of Keswick. It possesses two subsidiary summits: one unnamed (usually referred to as 'subsidiary summit', situated above Hobcarton Crag); the other Hobcarton End.

== Topography ==
Grisedale Pike is a large fell throwing down three long ridges to the valley floors and two shorter ones that link to the adjoining fell of Hopegill Head and the strategically important Coledale Hause which links the fell to the rest of the Coledale Fells. It is bounded to the south by the 2 1/2-mile (4-kilometre) valley of Coledale and to the north by the Whinlatter Pass which carries the B5292 motor road. The village of Braithwaite sits at the foot of the long eastern ridge, and some of the northern slopes have been planted by the Forestry Commission, with the Hospital Plantation occupying much of the valley of Grisedale.

== Geology ==
The ridge is composed of the laminated mudstone and siltstone of the Kirkstile Formation, typical of the Skiddaw group.

The Coledale side of the fell has been extensively mined, with the Force Crag mine being the last working lead mine in the Lake District before closing in 1990; it also produced zinc and barite. The mine has had many owners and been closed and reopened regularly since the early nineteenth century. The mine suffered a major collapse in 1990 which led to the owners, the New Coledale Mining Company, deciding to close it.

== Ascents ==
The majority of ascents of Grisedale Pike usually start at the village of Braithwaite using a well blazed trail up the eastern ridge. An alternative ascent starts at a car park in Hospital Plantation near the top of the Whinlatter Pass and goes up the northern ridge taking in the “Nuttall” top of Hobcarton End before continuing to the summit. From the same starting point it is possible to climb the fell up the north eastern ridge following a ruined dry stone wall.

Grisedale Pike is often included in the circular walk called the Coledale Round, an 11-mile (17.5-kilometre) walk starting and finishing at Braithwaite. It includes the other fells of Hopegill Head, Eel Crag, Sail, Scar Crags and Causey Pike with over 1300 metres of ascent. The view from the top of the fell is comprehensive with the Cumbrian coast in view to the west and the Pennines seen in the distance to the east. Grisedale Pike has a subsidiary top, 800 metres to the south west of the main summit. It is unnamed on maps but has been given the name of Hobcarton Crag by writers: at 739 metres (2425 feet) it has Nuttall and Hewitt status.

== Summit ==
A description of the view from west round clockwise, from this computer-generated panorama:

The hills near Belfast (about 180 km (110 mi) away) are visible over the sea to the west. In the north, the Southern Uplands of Scotland can be seen, including Merrick (62), White Coomb (58) and the closer Criffel (28). In the foreground to this is the Lord's Seat group (3).

The distant skyline continues over the Kielder Forest hills (55) to reach The Cheviot (75) before it is interrupted by the Skiddaw group (6) and Blencathra (8) with the Vale of Keswick and Bassenthwaite Lake in the foreground. The section of the Pennines containing Cross Fell (31) is visible.

The Helvellyn range (10) occupies the skyline to the east, fronted by the High Seat ridge (6), and in front of that, Catbells (3) and Causey Pike (2). Ingleborough (45) can be seen to the south-east. Then come the Langdale Pikes (11), the Coniston Fells (14), Bowfell (10) and Scafell Pike (10) with the Dale Head group (5) in front.

To the south-west the view is dominated by Crag Hill (1) and Grasmoor (2). A small portion of Wales (107) is visible to Crag Hill's left. To the west, above Hopegill Head (1), can be seen the Isle of Man (54) and Slieve Donard in Northern Ireland (112), the most distant peak visible.
