= Braithwaite =

Village in Cumbria, England

Coordinates: 54.60170°N 3.19190°W

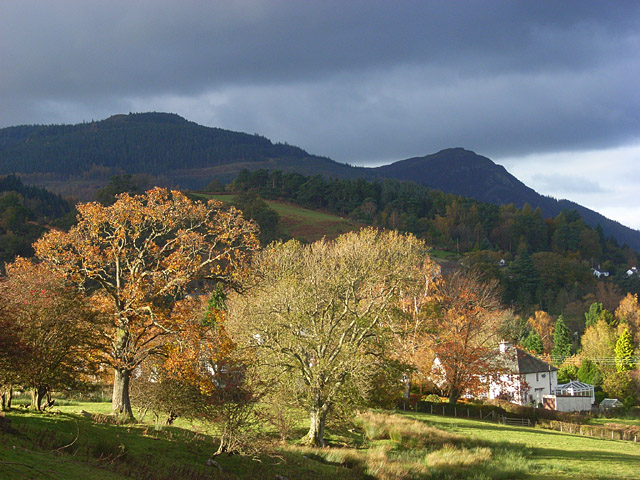
- Braithwaite

- Location in Allerdale, Cumbria Location within Cumbria
- OS grid reference: NY231236
- Civil parish: Above Derwent
- Unitary authority: Cumberland
- Ceremonial county: Cumbria
- Region: North West
- Country: England
- Sovereign state: United Kingdom
- Post town: KESWICK
- Postcode district: CA12
- Dialling code: 017687
- Police: Cumbria
- Fire: Cumbria
- Ambulance: North West
- UK Parliament: Penrith and Solway

Braithwaite /ˈbrɛθɪt/ is a village in the northern Lake District, in Cumbria, England. Historically in Cumberland, it lies just to the west of Keswick and to the east of the Grisedale Pike ridge. It forms part of the civil parish of Above Derwent.

The eastern end of the Whinlatter Pass road is in the village. The A66 road bypasses Braithwaite, but does not enter the village.

Braithwaite is situated around Coledale Beck, a brook which joins Newlands Beck shortly after passing through the village. Newlands Beck (coming from the Newlands Valley) then flows north towards Bassenthwaite Lake.

Braithwaite has a Village Shop by the Low Bridge, several pubs, including the Coledale Inn, the Royal Oak and the Middle Ruddings Hotel. Braithwaite is easily accessible due to its close proximity to the A66. It has a campsite with a caravan park, B + Bs, pubs and guest houses. It has a wide range of sports including sailing, climbing, abseiling, canoeing, hang-gliding, parasailing, orienteering, bird watching (For ospreys in the nearby lakes), photography and virtually any other outdoor pursuit all within four miles of the village.

Nearby is the Hope Memorial Camp, a residential centre used throughout the year by youth groups from all over the country. The camp was the brain-child of Mr A H Hope, Headmaster of The Roan School, Greenwich (now The John Roan School) from 1916 to 1930. In 1923, with his own money, Hope bought forty acres of land to the north-west of the village and built four huts on it, to provide his South London grammar school boys with 'an opportunity of seeing mountains and lakes and of having the valuable experience of camping and living at close quarters with others.' With the aid of The Roan Foundation, the original green and white painted wooden structures were replaced in 1989 by more substantial ones using modern building materials.

There is an Orthodox Church in Braithwaite, dedicated to a few British Saints: Saints Bega, Mungo and Herbert. They are under the jurisdiction of the Archdiocese of Great Britain through the Ecumenical Patriarchate of Constantinople. The Church is an old Methodist Church and was purchased from them in 2017.

The Cockermouth, Keswick and Penrith Railway, now closed, called at a station in Braithwaite.

Braithwaite is situated next to the fell called Barrow. A small mountain in the Newlands region which is a short walk from Braithwaite.

Braithwaite is near to the Whinlatter Forest which has many walking trails of varying length.

Braithwaite Farm hosts a small business hub which includes Keswick Groomers, The Flight Park, Milican, Alpacaly Ever After (offices) and KCS - IT Support & Web Design.

== See also ==
- 2015–16 Great Britain and Ireland floods#Cumbria and Lancashire floods
