= Crag Fell =

Fell in the Lake District, England

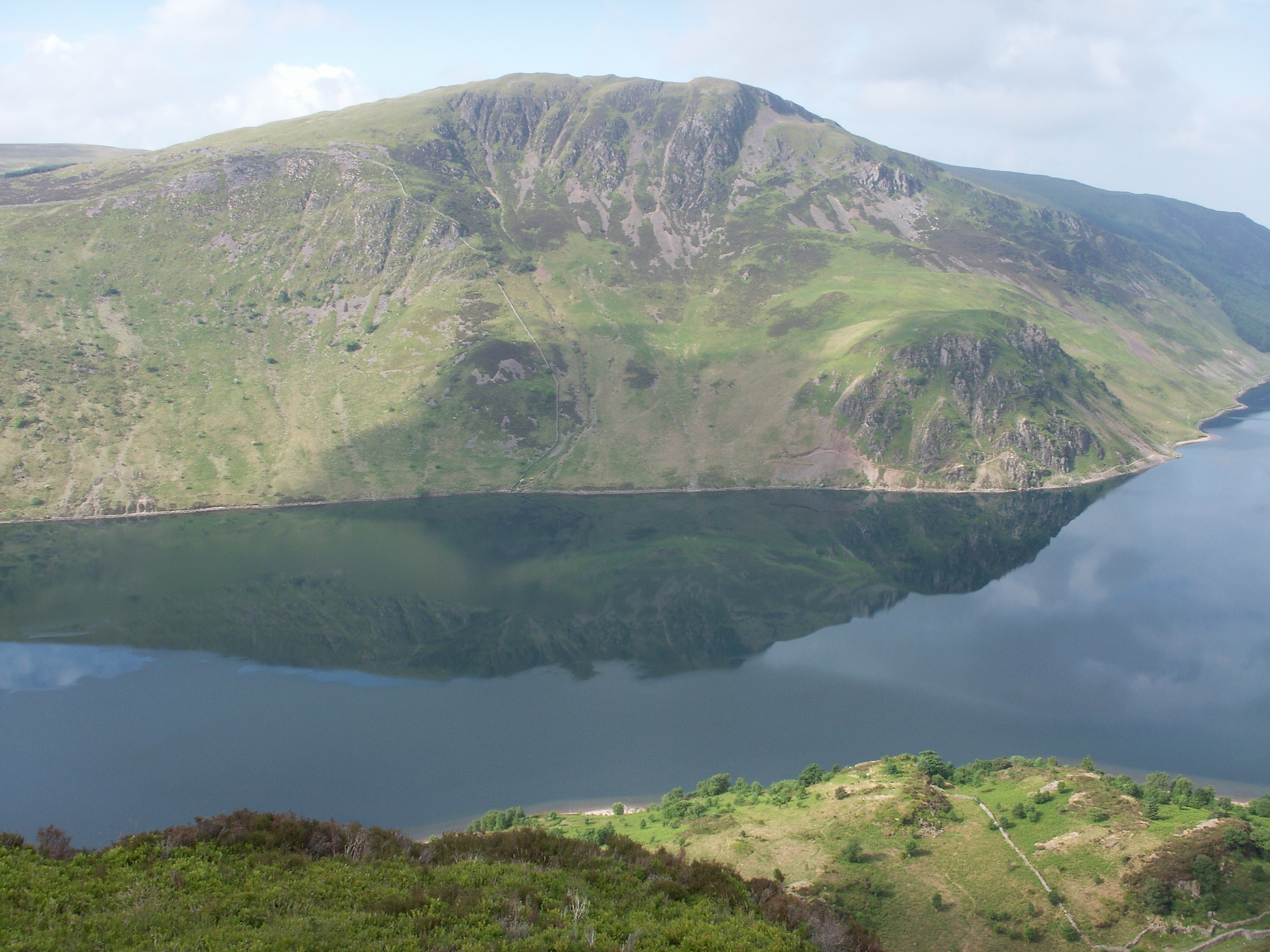
- Crag Fell across Ennerdale Water from Bowness Knott

Highest point
- Elevation: 1,715 ft (523 m)
- Prominence: c. 115m
- Parent peak: Pillar
- Listing: Wainwright
- Coordinates: 54°31′01″N 3°23′49″W

Geography
- Location within the Lake District Location within the former Borough of Copeland
- Location: Cumbria, England
- Parent range: Lake District, Western Fells
- OS grid: NY097144
- Topo map: OS Landranger 89, 90, Explorer OL4

Crag Fell is a hill in the English Lake District. It is part of the Lank Rigg group, standing above Ennerdale Water in the Western Fells. The craggy northern face above the lake gives the fell its name, prominent in views from the car park at Bowness Knott. Ascents are commonly made from the foot of Ennerdale Water.

== Topography ==
The Western Fells occupy a triangular sector of the Lake District, bordered by the River Cocker to the north east and Wasdale to the south east. Westwards the hills diminish toward the coastal plain of Cumberland. At the central hub of the high country are Great Gable and its satellites, while two principal ridges fan out on either flank of Ennerdale, the western fells in effect being a great horseshoe around this long wild valley. Crag Fell stands near the extremity of the southern arm.

The main watershed runs broadly westwards from Great Gable, dividing the headwaters of Ennerdale and Wasdale. The fells in this section are Kirk Fell, Pillar, Scoat Fell, Haycock and Caw Fell. The surrounding valleys gradually diverge until other rivers spring up to drain the intervening country. Worm Gill is one such watercourse, running south westward from Caw Fell, and forcing the ridge to detour northwards around the head of its valley. Beyond this stand the fells of the Lank Rigg group, the final high country within the National Park. Crag Fell and Grike complete the westward line of the ridge, whilst Lank Rigg lies to the south across the head of the River Calder.

The northern flanks of Crag Fell tumble roughly down to the shore of Ennerdale Water. One tier of crags is directly below the summit, Revelin Crag being a notable feature, whilst a second abuts the lake itself. This is Anglers Crag, also known as Robin Hood's Chair. By contrast the southern slopes fall steadily to the headstream of the Calder, the lower section being planted with conifers.

South eastward from Crag Fell begins the long ridge to Caw Fell, first descending to a col at 1,320 ft and then rising gently over the intermediate top of Iron Crag. To the west a narrower ridge runs along above the plantation to Grike. Crag Fell is bounded by Ben Gill in the west and Red Beck in the east.

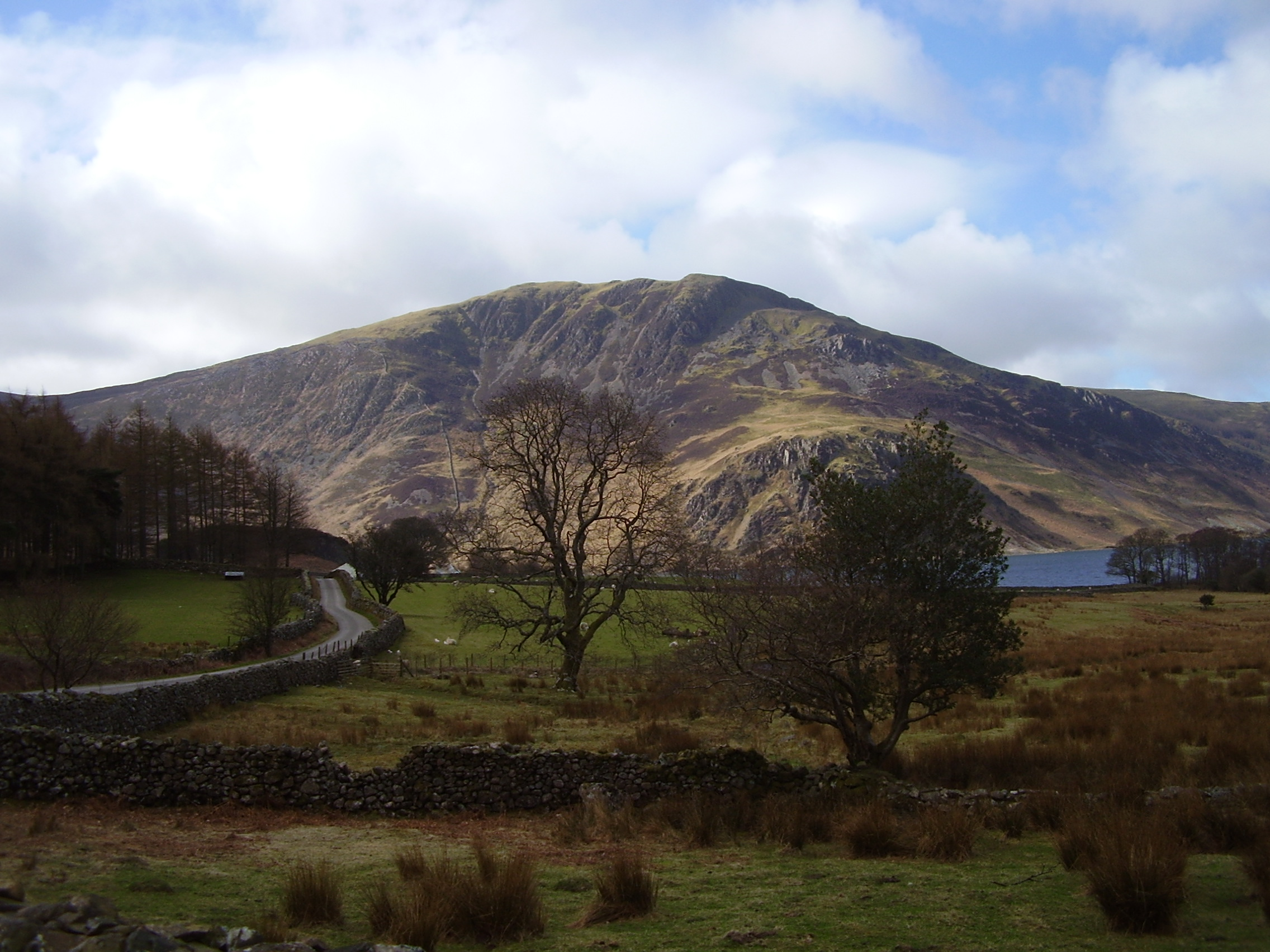
Crag Fell from across Ennerdale

== Mining ==
The remains of a number of iron mines can be found above the shore of the lake. Small trials were driven beneath Revelin Crag, above Anglers Crag and on the upper eastern slopes above Red Beck. Although haematite was found, the quantities were never sufficient and all of the mines had closed by 1896.

== Summit ==
There are two mounds on the top of the fell, that to the north west being the summit. The whole area is undulating and grassy. There is a wide panorama to seaward, taking in what Alfred Wainwright described as the "grotesque collection of towers and minarets of the Calder Hall atomic power station". The head of Ennerdale Water is seen to the east, surrounded by the high cirque of the Western Fells. Distant Fairfield and Ullscarf put in unexpected appearances through the gaps.

== Ascents ==
A narrow road runs east from the village of Ennerdale Bridge, giving access to a pair of car parks near the outflow of the lake. Two principal alternatives are available from here to climb Crag Fell. The first is to loosely follow the course of Ben Gill up beside the plantation, before swinging left toward the summit. A more interesting route is to use the lakeshore path to reach the top of Anglers Crag, before working up the hillside to turn Revelin Crag to the west. This takes the walker past what Wainwright called the Crag Fell Pinnacles, a fractured spine of rock rising 80 ft above the angle of the slope. Other ascents can be made from the Coldfell Road, south of Ennerdale Bridge. A track, formerly the mine road, can be followed almost to the summit, passing over the flanks of Grike. A circuit of the upper Calder, taking in the whole Lank Rigg group can also be started from here.
