= Grike (Lake District) =

Fell in the Lake District, England

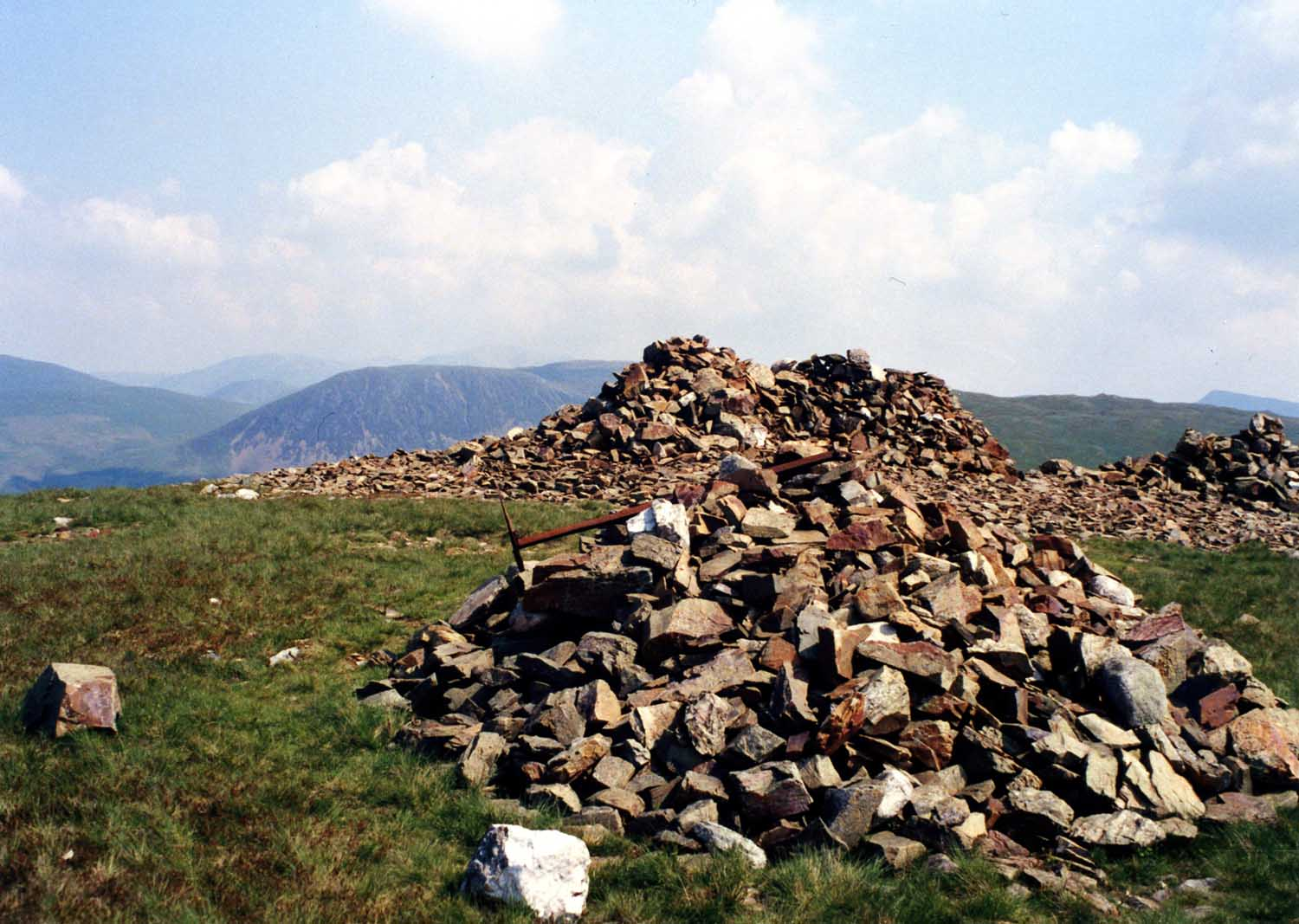
- Grike summit with its massive cairn and two smaller ones.

Highest point
- Elevation: 488 m (1,601 ft)
- Prominence: c. 37 m
- Parent peak: Crag Fell
- Listing: Wainwright
- Coordinates: 54°30′47″N 3°24′54″W

Geography
- Location within the Lake District Location within the former Borough of Copeland
- Location: Cumbria, England
- Parent range: Lake District, Western Fells
- OS grid: NY086141
- Topo map: OS Landranger 89, 90, Explorer OL4

Grike is a hill in the west of the English Lake District, near Ennerdale Water. It is part of the Lank Rigg group, the most westerly Wainwright as the fells diminish toward the coastal plain. It can be climbed from Kinniside or Ennerdale Bridge.

== Topography ==
The Western Fells occupy a triangular sector of the Lake District, bordered by the River Cocker to the north east and Wasdale to the south east. Westwards, the hills diminish toward the coastal plain of Cumberland. At the central hub of the high country are Great Gable and its satellites, while two principal ridges fan out on either flank of Ennerdale, the western fells in effect being a great horseshoe around this long wild valley. Grike stands at the extremity of the southern arm.

The main watershed runs broadly westwards from Great Gable, dividing the headwaters of Ennerdale and Wasdale. The fells in this section are Kirk Fell, Pillar, Scoat Fell, Haycock and Caw Fell. The surrounding valleys gradually diverge until other rivers spring up to drain the intervening country. Worm Gill is one such watercourse, running southwards from Caw Fell and forcing the ridge to detour northwards around the head of its valley. Beyond this stand the fells of the Lank Rigg group, the final high country within the National Park. Crag Fell and Grike complete the westward line of the ridge, while Lank Rigg itself lies to the south across the head of the River Calder.

The western ridge of Crag Fell narrows to a marshy depression at 1,480 ft, before climbing again up the easy slopes of Grike. The southern flanks of both fells have been planted with a long belt of conifers, running down to the headwaters of the Calder. Grike's northern slopes are also forested where gradient and crags allow. The Ennerdale face is less impressive than that of Crag Fell, although deeply riven by the beds of Ben Gill and Red Gill. Grike looks down not upon the lake itself, but on the floodplain of the River Ehen, its outflowing stream.

West of the summit is a broad slope leading down to Heckbarley (1,280 ft), a wide plateau with little prominence which is separated from the main fell by Stinking Gill and Goat Gill. Heckbarley has Grike's only real crags on its northern face. The ridge now turns south over a wooded depression to cross the minor tops of Blakeley Raise (1,276 ft), Burn Edge (1,050 ft) and Swarth Fell (1,099 ft). In his influential Pictorial Guide to the Lakeland Fells, Alfred Wainwright included only the first of these within the territory of Grike, although some later writers like Bill Birkett have added the whole of the ridge as far as the National Park boundary. The Coldfell road runs along the western side of these tops.

== Mining ==
Iron mines operated beneath the northern slopes of Grike and Crag Fell from 1860 to 1896. Levels were driven into the banks of Goat Gill and Red Gill, with the principal working, Main Drift Mine, between the two. The yields were never as great as hoped and the venture was a commercial failure.

== Summit ==
The top bears a massive stone cairn together with two smaller ones, built from the many specimens lying near the summit on an otherwise grassy dome. The main cairn gives the fell its alternative local name, Stone Man. A weather station is a rather more modern addition to the summit decorations.

The view seawards is extensive, but to the east the Lakeland panorama is partly obscured by Crag Fell. The horseshoe of the Western Fells is all that can be seen well, although the summits of Dollywaggon Pike and Fairfield put in unexpected appearances, along with Skiddaw and a small section of the North Western Fells. The foot of Ennerdale Water is also in sight.

== Ascents ==
From Ennerdale Bridge, or the car parks near the outflow of the lake, the lane to Crag Farm can be used to give access onto the fell. A good path makes for Crag Fell and this can be followed as far as Ben Gill before turning right up the hillside. The Coldfell road provides another starting point, a track heading eastward from near the Kinniside Stone Circle. This was once the road to the Crag Fell Iron Mines and crosses the initial ridge between Heckbarley and Blakeley Raise. It then contours along the southern flank of Grike, just above the trees.

== Gallery ==
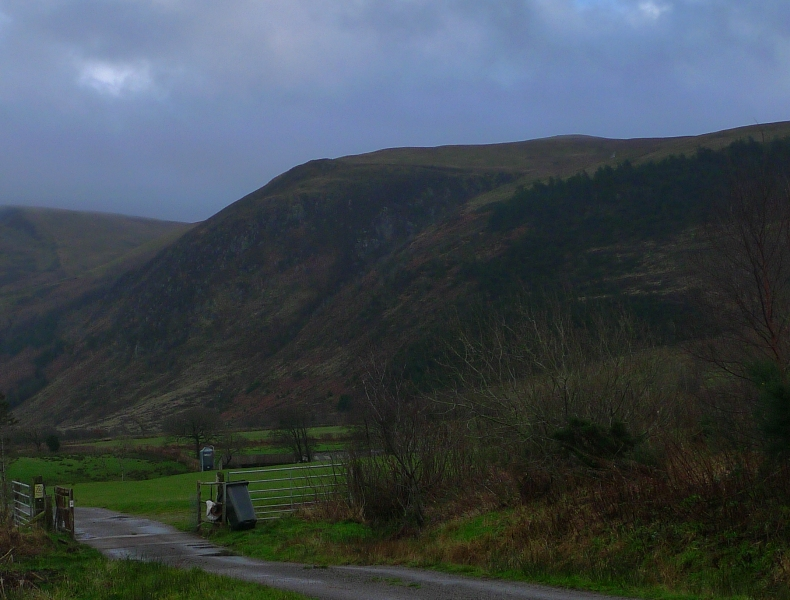
The North face of Grike from Ennderdale

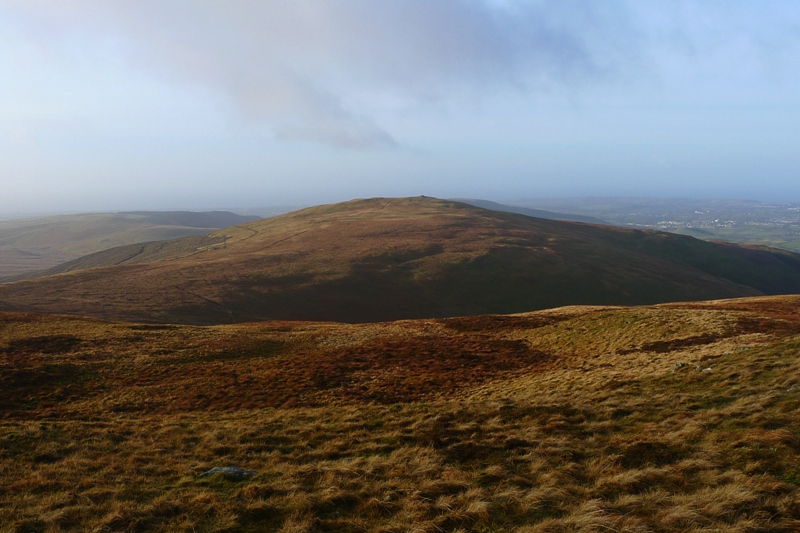
Eastern aspect of Grike from Crag Fell
