= Lank Rigg =

Fell in the Lake District, England

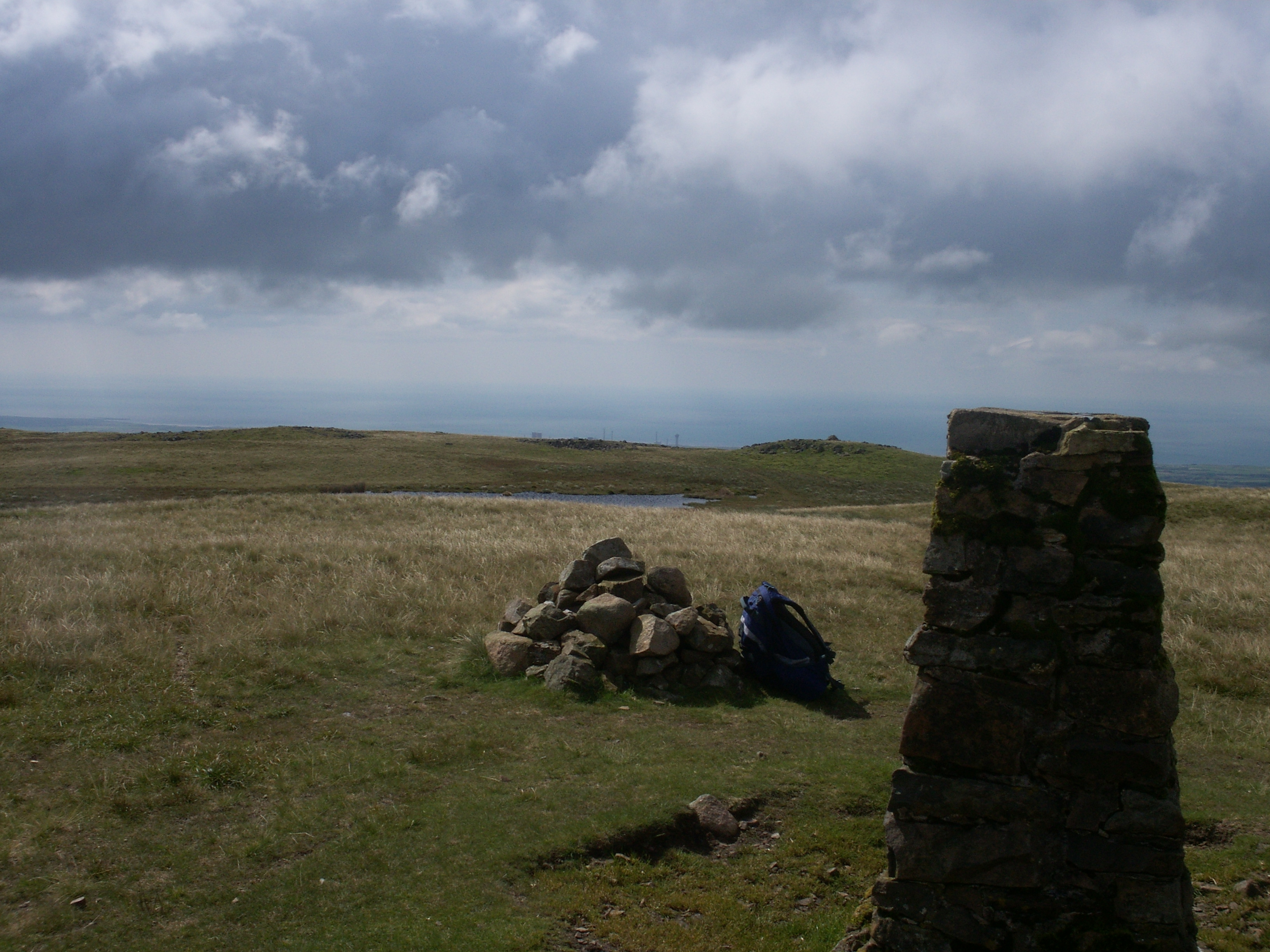
- Looking west from the summit

Highest point
- Elevation: 541 m (1,775 ft)
- Prominence: 111 m (364 ft)
- Listing: Wainwright
- Coordinates: 54°29′38″N 3°24′11″W

Geography
- Location within the Lake District Location within the former Borough of Copeland
- Location: Cumbria, England
- Parent range: Lake District, Western Fells
- OS grid: NY092119
- Topo map: OS Landranger 89, 90, Explorer OL4

Lank Rigg is a fell in the English Lake District. It stands to the south of Ennerdale in the Western Fells. A sprawling hill with gentle grassy slopes it can be climbed from various points on the Coldfell road. It carries various remains from ancient habitation.

== Topography ==
The Western Fells occupy a triangular sector of the Lake District, bordered by the River Cocker to the north east and Wasdale to the south east. Westwards the hills diminish toward the coastal plain of Cumberland. At the central hub of the high country are Great Gable and its satellites, while two principal ridges fan out on either flank of Ennerdale, the western fells in effect being a great horseshoe around this long wild valley. Lank Rigg is the highest of the group of fells at the extremity of the southern arm.

The main watershed runs broadly westwards from Great Gable, dividing the headwaters of Ennerdale and Wasdale. The fells in this section are Kirk Fell, Pillar, Scoat Fell, Haycock and Caw Fell. The surrounding valleys gradually diverge until other rivers spring up to drain the intervening country. Worm Gill is one such watercourse, running south westward from Caw Fell, and forcing the ridge to detour northwards around the head of its valley. Beyond this stand the fells of the Lank Rigg group, the final high country within the National Park. Crag Fell and Grike complete the westward line of the ridge, whilst Lank Rigg itself stands to the south across the head of the River Calder.

Lank Rigg occupies an upland area about 2 miles (3 km) square, bordered by the River Calder and Worm Gill to east and west. Worm Gill sweeps around the southern flank of the fell, joining the Calder at Thornholme to complete the moat on three sides. To the north east, via the subsidiary top of Whoap, 1,676 ft (511 m), is a connection to the main ridge. This joins it perpendicularly between Crag Fell and Caw Fell. The slopes of Lank Rigg are uniformly gentle, clad in grass with the occasional rash of stones. There is a small tarn just below the summit to the south west.

Although Wainwright regarded only Lank Rigg as an independent summit, other guidebooks give equal prominence to Whoap and the western tops of Latterbarrow 1,161 ft (354 m) and Kinniside 1,230 ft (375 m).

== History ==
Lank Rigg carries the remains of ancient settlement with a tumulus near the summit and various enclosures and cairns near Tongue Bank. These are marked as ‘cairn’, ‘settlement’ and ‘homestead’ on Ordnance Survey maps.

== Summit ==
The highest point bears an Ordnance Survey triangulation column. The Lakeland view is uninspiring, apart from an unexpected appearance by distant Blencathra, but the coastal plain is well seen.

To mark the completion of his Pictorial Guide to the Lakeland Fells, Alfred Wainwright buried a two-shilling (now ten pence) piece under a stone at the summit. He made mention of this in the last volume so that the first reader on the fell could collect the prize. It was, as he said, ‘a reckless thing to do’. Visitors to the summit may still occasionally find coins hidden there by generous fellwalkers in memory of Wainwright's act.

== Ascents ==
The unfenced Coldfell road runs south from Ennerdale Bridge to Calder Bridge, providing the best access to Lank Rigg. A footpath leads off eastward between Blakeley Raise and Burn Edge, dropping into the upper Calder valley. This can then be followed to the col between Whoap and Lank Rigg. A circular outing can be devised from the same starting point, also visiting Crag Fell and Grike.

From further south on the road a lane gives access to the Calder just opposite Tongue How. A long ascent up the south western slopes then follows.

== Gallery ==
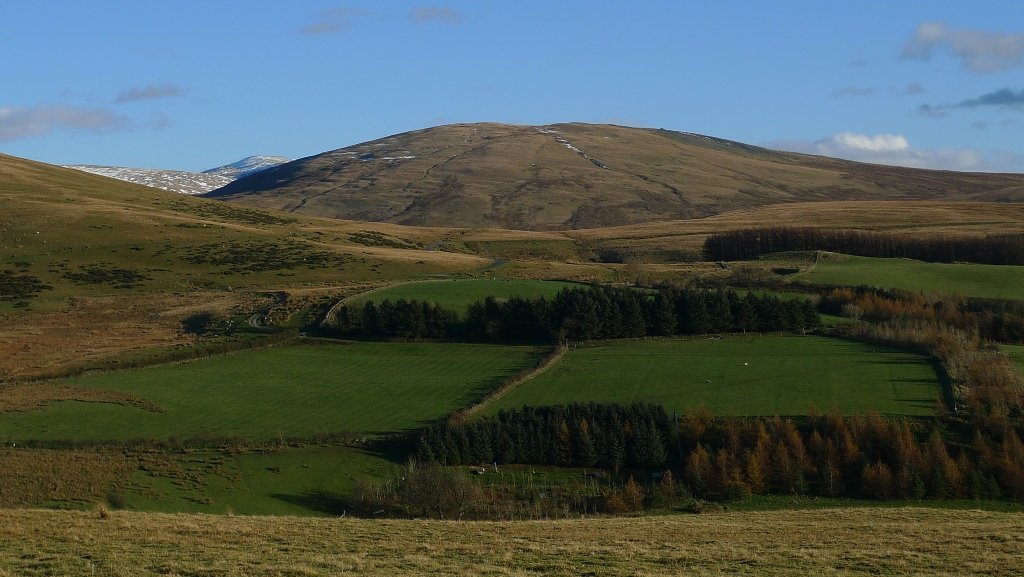
Lank Rigg from Flat Fell
