= Yewbarrow =

Mountain in the English Lake District, Cumbria, England

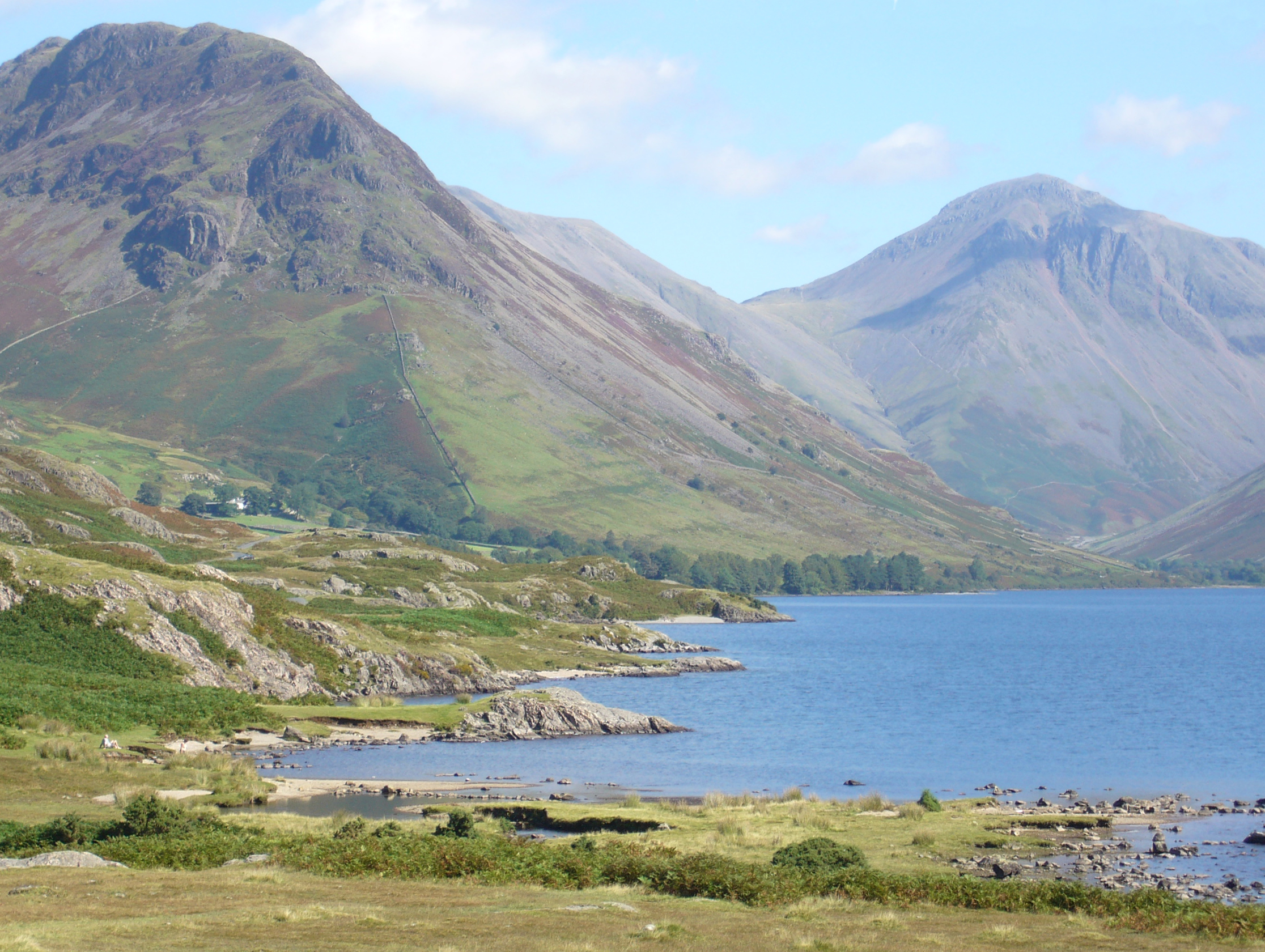
- Yewbarrow (left) from Wast Water

Highest point
- Elevation: 628 m (2,060 ft)
- Prominence: 142 m (466 ft)
- Listing: Hewitt, Wainwright, Nuttall
- Coordinates: 54°27′51″N 3°16′39″W

Geography
- Location within the Lake District Location within the former Borough of Copeland
- Location: Cumbria, England
- Parent range: Lake District, Western Fells
- OS grid: NY173084
- Topo map: OS Landrangers 89, 90, Explorer OL6

Yewbarrow is a fell, in the English Lake District, which lies immediately north of the head of Wast Water. It is 628 metres (2,060 feet) high and in shape resembles the upturned hull of a boat or a barrow. Yewbarrow is on the left in the classic view of Great Gable and Wast Water.

The top of Stirrup Crag forms a second summit 616 metres (2,021 feet) high, one-half mile (0.80 km) north of the main summit. The Hewitt and Nuttall lists classify the Yewbarrow North Top as a separate summit.

The name is derived from the past prevalence of yew trees on the fell and its "barrow" shape.

== Topography ==
The Western Fells occupy a triangular sector of the Lake District, bordered by the River Cocker to the north-east and Wasdale to the south-east. Westwards the hills diminish toward the coastal plain of Cumberland. At the central hub of the high country are Great Gable and its satellites, while two principal ridges fan out on either flank of Ennerdale, the western fells in effect being a great horseshoe around this long wild valley. Yewbarrow is an outlier of the southern arm.

The main watershed runs broadly westwards from Great Gable, dividing the headwaters of Ennerdale and Wasdale. Travelling in this direction the principal hills are Kirk Fell, Pillar, Scoat Fell, Haycock and Caw Fell. Scoat Fell throws out a long southern ridge terminating in Yewbarrow, with Red Pike standing part way along.

The southern end of Yewbarrow rises steeply from the shore of Wastwater, the crest of the fell running a little east of north for about two miles. Just beyond the second top, the ridge swings sharply to the west at the depression of Dore Head, 475 m (1,558 ft), continuing then onto Red Pike. The strath of Wasdale Head forms the eastern boundary of the fell with the quiet valley of Over Beck to the west. The ridge-top is rimmed by crags, particularly above Over Beck, and at either end. Stirrup Crag lies below the north summit, sometimes lending its name to the top, while Dropping Crag and Bell Rib guard the southern end of the crest.

== Geology ==
Listed summits of Yewbarrow
Name	Grid ref	Height	Status
Yewbarrow North Top	NY175091	616 m (2,021 ft)	Hewitt

The summit is formed from the tuff, lapilli tuff and breccia of the Lingmell Formation. The eastern slopes display the rhyolitic rocks of the Long Top Member and Crinkle Member. The crags on the western face are outcrops of the plagioclase-phyric andesite lavas of the Birker Fell Formation.

== Ascents ==
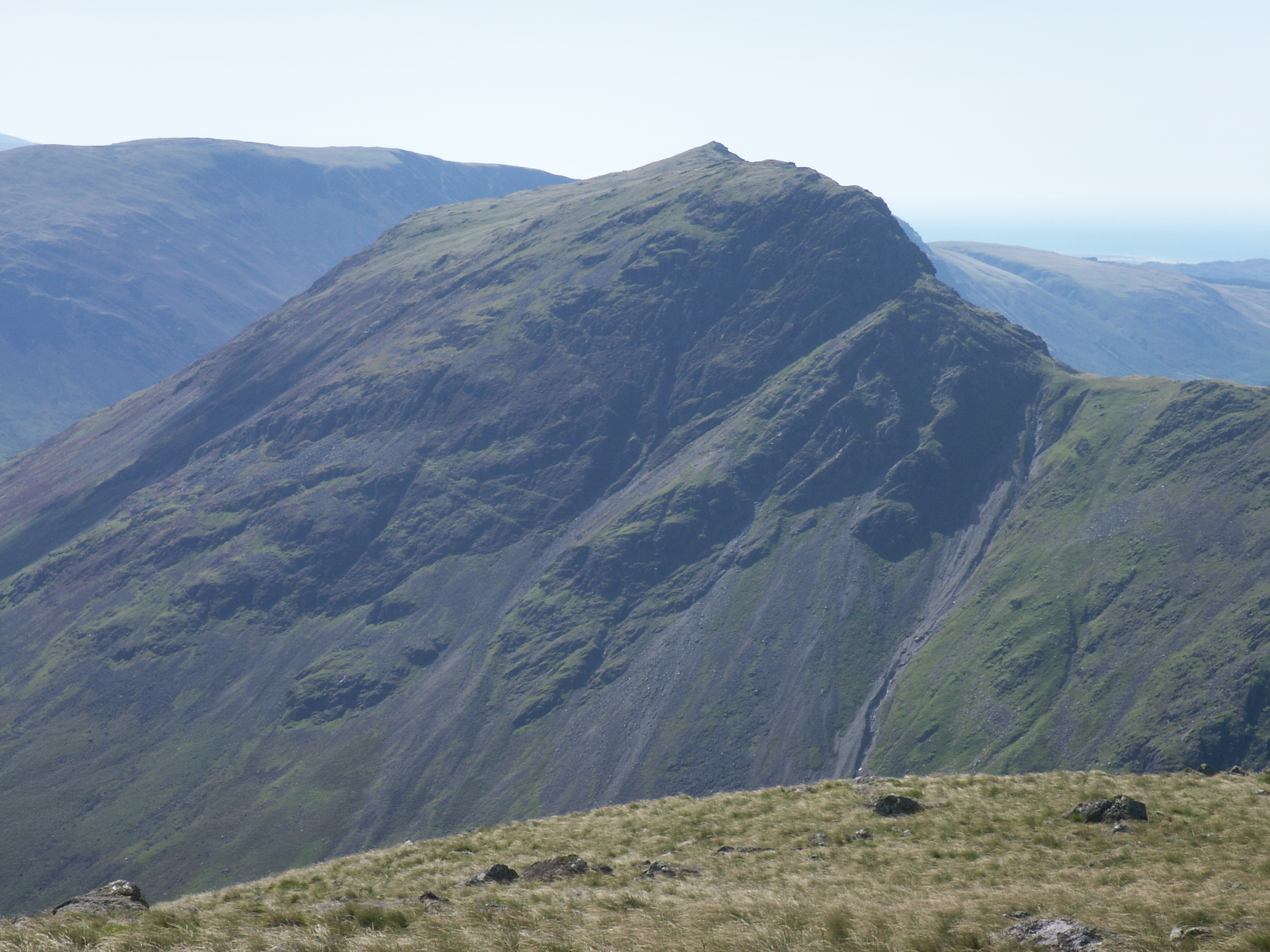
The northern face of Yewbarrow as seen from the slopes of Pillar

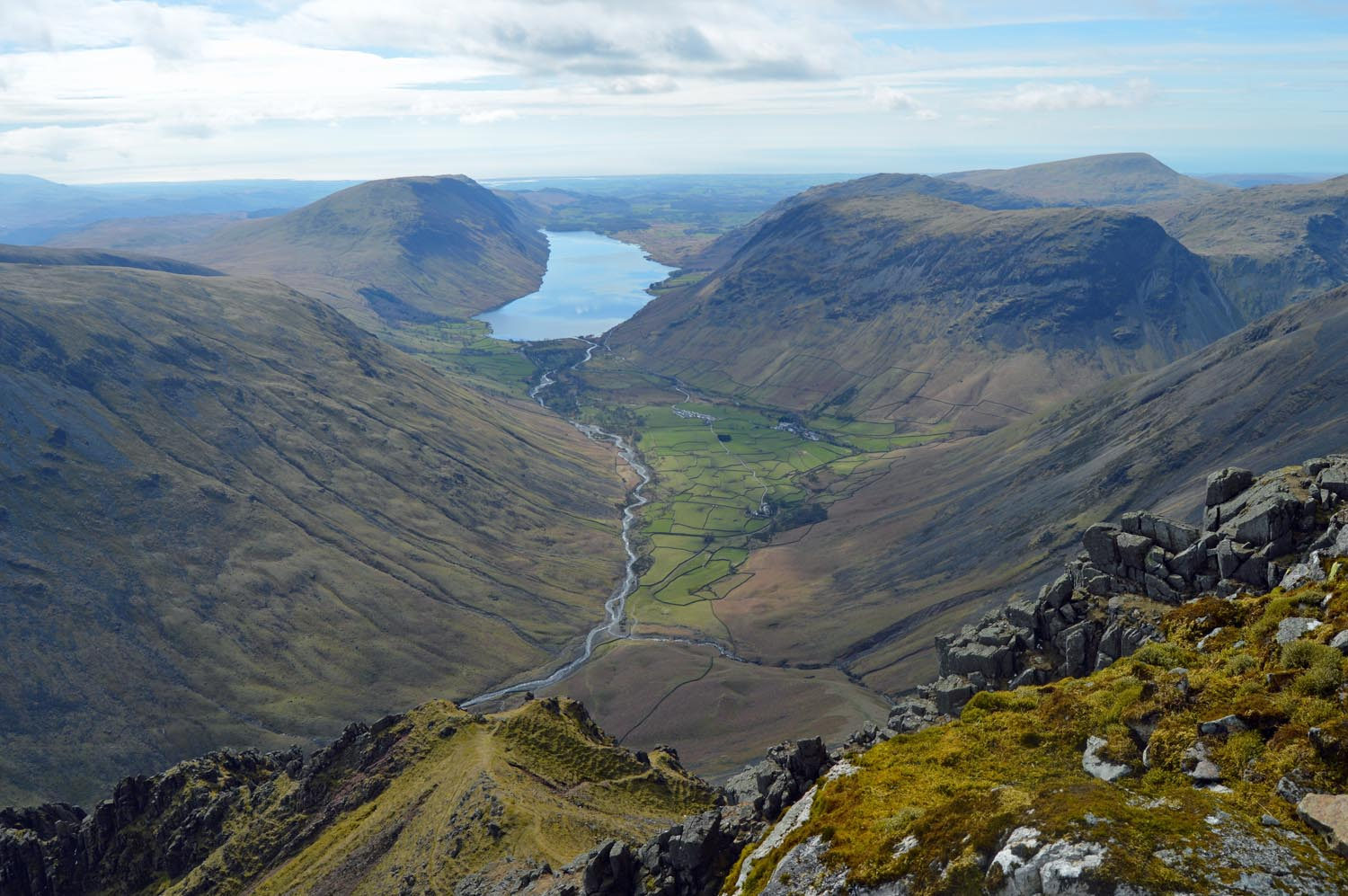
The view from the cairn put up by the Westmorland Brothers to the SW of the summit of Great Gable, showing Yewbarrow in right centre.

Although smaller than the other fells surrounding Wasdale Head — Scafell Pike, Scafell, Great Gable, Kirk Fell and Pillar — the ascent of Yewbarrow by the two traditional routes involves some scrambling. There are two primary ascents to Yewbarrow from Wasdale Head, via Overbeck Bridge and the Great Door (a cleft in the rocks providing thrilling views of Wast Water) or via Dore Head and Stirrup Crag. It is possible to circumvent almost all the scrambling on the route via Great Door by taking a path to the left of the major gully, and a cairned track without any scrambling runs up the west side from below Stirrup Crag to the minor col between the two tops of Yewbarrow.

It can also be climbed as part of the Mosedale Horseshoe, which can start or end at Yewbarrow and also includes Red Pike, Scoat Fell, Steeple and Pillar.

== Summit ==
The summit bears a cairn set on grass. Yewbarrow is a vantage point for the high fells in this part of the Lake District. Its location makes it have uninterrupted views of the Scafells, Great Gable, Kirk Fell and Pillar.
