= Whoap =

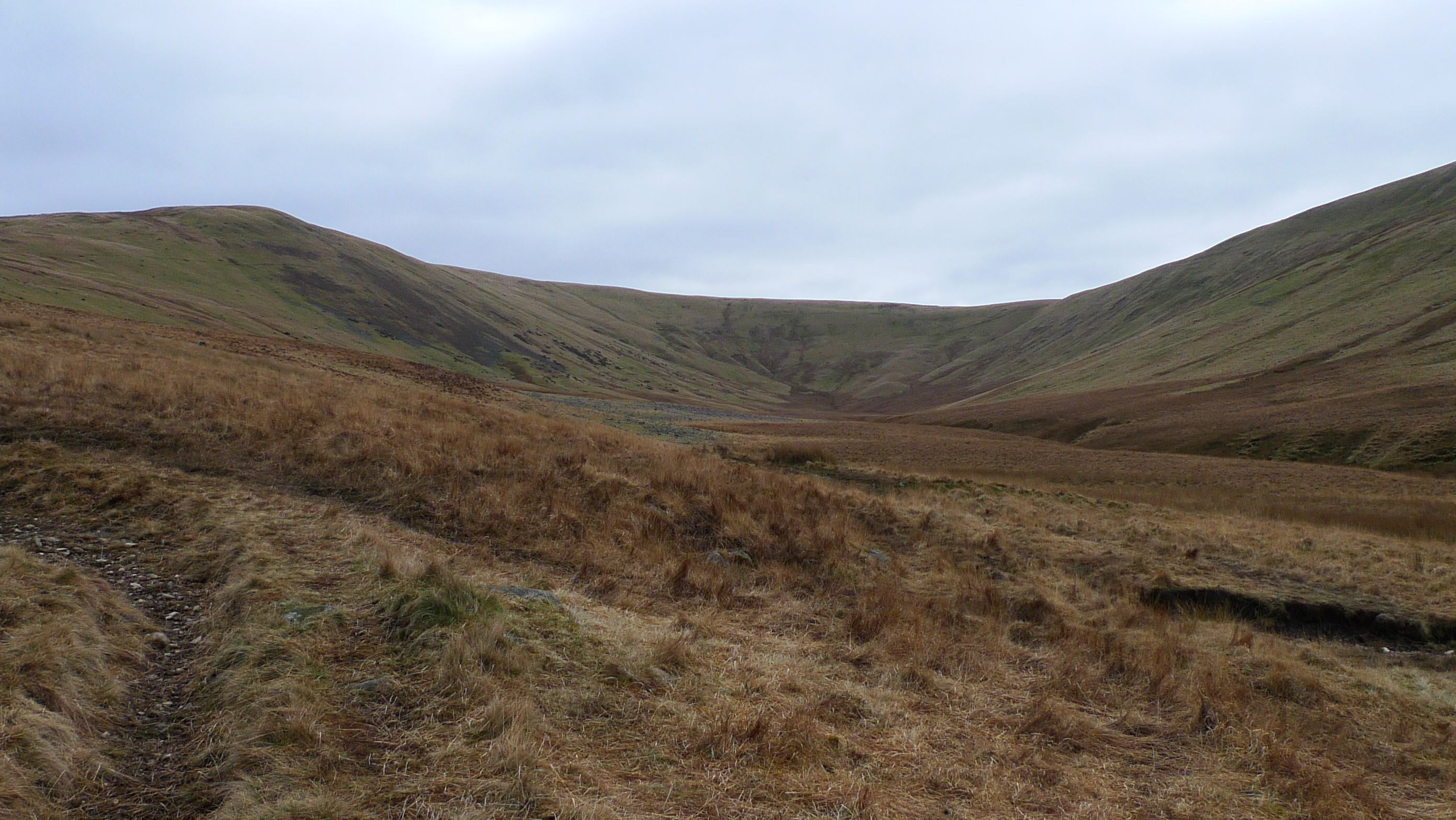
- Whoap (left) from the valley of the River Calder

Highest point
- Elevation: 511 m (1,677 ft)
- Parent peak: Lank Rigg
- Coordinates: 54°30′15″N 3°23′45″W

Geography
- Location within the Lake District
- Location: Lake District, England

Whoap is a hill located near the western edge of the English Lake District, standing at 511 m. It is part of the Lank Rigg group and is separated from this fell by an unnamed col, known locally as the Whoap Step. Whoap is not listed as a Wainwright, although it is briefly mentioned in the chapters for Lank Rigg and Crag Fell in Volume 7: The Western Fells.

== Topography ==
Whoap is a tongue-shaped hill lying between Lank Rigg to the south and Crag Fell to the north. The southern flank of Whoap is considerably steeper than the other aspects and features a small area of scree but no rocky outcrop.

== Ascent ==
The easiest ascent of Whoap is from the Coldfell road, at the point where it forms a right angle at the base of Blakeley Raise and Burn Edge. A track leads down into the Calder valley at which point it crosses Comb Beck and continues along the valley until a crossing of the Calder itself is reached. At this point, there are two options; either turn left and ascend Whoap directly, or continue along the valley to the unnamed col separating Whoap from Lank Rigg before turning left for the final ascent. The second route is less strenuous, although the ground can become quite boggy after rainfall.

== Summit ==
The summit of Whoap is marked by a small boulder and provides views of Grike, Crag Fell and the area between Whoap and Crag Fell, known as Black Potts.

== Gallery ==
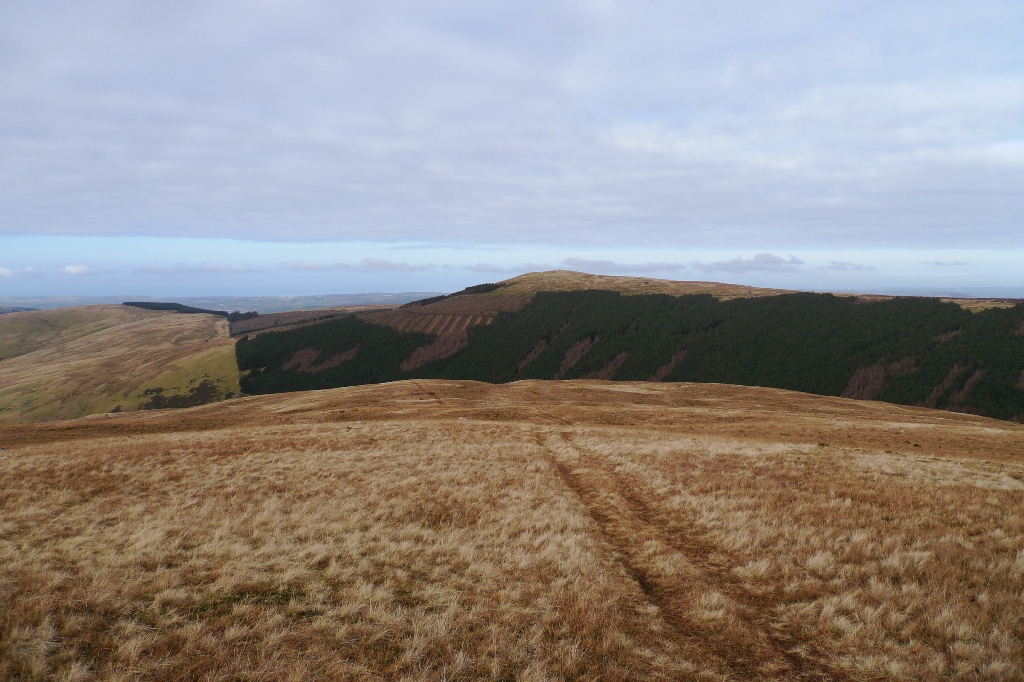
View from Whoap, looking West

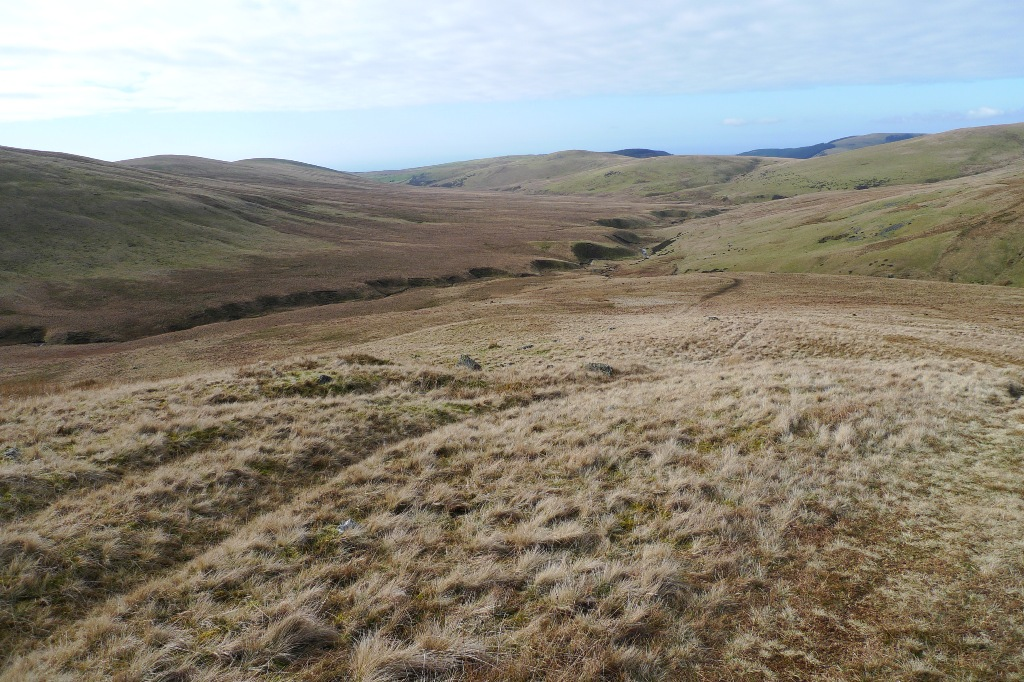
The Calder Valley
