= Red Pike (Wasdale) =

Mountain in the English Lake District, Cumbria, England

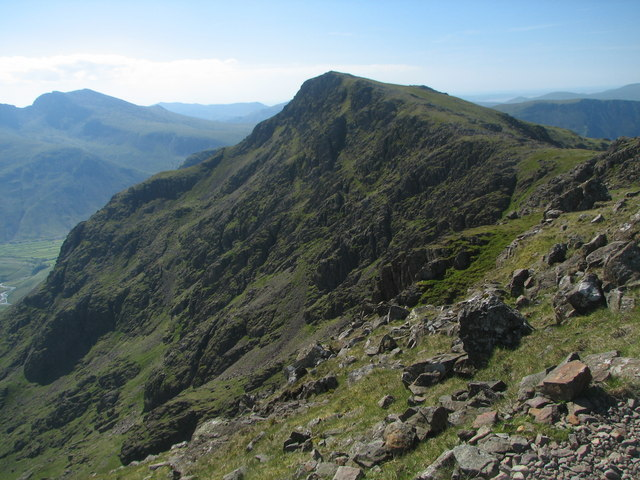

Highest point
- Elevation: 826 m (2,710 ft)
- Prominence: c. 62 m
- Listing: Wainwright, Nuttall, Hewitt
- Coordinates: 54°28′59″N 3°17′24″W

Geography
- Location within the Lake District Location within the former Borough of Copeland
- Location: Cumbria, England
- Parent range: Lake District, Western Fells
- OS grid: NY165105
- Topo map: OS Landranger 89, Explorer OL4, OL6

Red Pike is a fell in the English Lake District. It is 826 m or 2,709 ft high and lies due north of Wast Water. It is often climbed as part of the Mosedale Horseshoe, a walk which also includes Pillar.

The fell can be confused with Red Pike (Buttermere), not least because its namesake is only three miles (five kilometres) away, so according to Alfred Wainwright it is conventional to call it Wasdale Red Pike.

== Topography ==
The Western Fells occupy a triangular sector of the Lake District, bordered by the River Cocker to the north east and Wasdale to the south east. Westwards the hills diminish toward the coastal plain of Cumberland. At the central hub of the high country are Great Gable and its satellites, while two principal ridges fan out on either flank of Ennerdale, the western fells in effect being a great horseshoe around this long wild valley. Red Pike is an outlier of the southern arm.

The main watershed runs broadly westwards from Great Gable, dividing the headwaters of Ennerdale and Wasdale. Travelling in this direction the principal hills are Kirk Fell, Pillar, Scoat Fell, Haycock and Caw Fell. Scoat Fell throws out a long southern ridge terminating in Yewbarrow and Red Pike stands part way along.

The Red Pike ridge occupies a broad area of high country between Nether Beck in the west and Mosedale in the east. The Mosedale face is steeper with considerable areas of Crag, whilst the western slopes descend slowly over around two miles (three kilometres). The ridge begins at an unnamed col to the southeast of Scoat Fell. This narrow depression is squeezed between Black Comb, the birthplace of Mosedale Beck, and Scoat Tarn, the primary feeder of Nether Beck. From the depression it is only a short climb to the summit of Red Pike, the majority of the ridge lying beyond on the long south easterly descent to Dore Head. At this col the watershed turns south west, rising to the twin summits of Yewbarrow. Dore Head is the source of Over Beck, the stream separating Yewbarrow from the long western flanks of Red Pike.

Red Pike presents an almost continuous wall of crags above Mosedale, particularly above Black Comb. Bull and Black Crags meanwhile guard the southern section. To the west a long shoulder of land falls gradually between Nether Beck and Over Beck, narrowing as they converge toward the shore of Wastwater. In the middle of the plateau is Low Tarn, a large shallow waterbody lying in a flat basin. It drains via Brimfull Beck into Over Beck. This whole area is unfrequented with few paths amongst the grassy hillocks and low crags. Scoat Tarn at the head of Nether Beck is by contrast a corrie tarn, held in place by grassy moraines. Its depth is around 65 ft (20 m).

Red Pike has a subsidiary southern top with a height of 2,627 ft (801 m).

== Geology ==
The fell is mainly composed of the plagioclase-phyric andesite lavas of the Birker Fell Formation. There are also sills of lapilli tuff and intrusions of rhyolite.

== Summit ==
The main summit bears a cairn perched on the brink of the Mosedale Crags. To the west is a gentle slope, carpeted with short turf. The southern top also bears a large cairn and, a hundred yards beyond, is The Chair. This is an armchair shaped windshelter built onto a rock outcrop, a few yards off the path. It provides a fine vantage point for views southward, and is so prominent on the climb from Dore Head that it once gave its name to the fell. Scoat Fell and Pillar obstruct the view northward. The Scafells are well seen, as are the Wasdale Screes.

== Ascents ==
From Overbeck Bridge on the Wastwater road a way can be found up to Low Tarn, gaining the summit via the long western slopes. Alternatively Over Beck can be followed to its source at Dore Head, before making up the south ridge. Dore Head can also be reached from Mosedale if starting from Wasdale Head, although a long climb up scree is involved. It is possible instead to ascend Black Comb on easier slopes and then return to the summit. Red Pike is often the start of the Mosedale Horseshoe, a ridgewalk also visiting Scoat Fell and Pillar. Depending upon the strength of the walker Yewbarrow and Kirk Fell may also be added.
