= Mosedale Horseshoe =

Mountain walk in the Lake District, England

The Mosedale Horseshoe is a celebrated mountain walk around Mosedale in the English Lake District: starting at Wasdale Head, it includes Kirk Fell, Yewbarrow, Red Pike, Scoat Fell, and Pillar. It is a circular walk of 22.5 kilometres (14.0 mi) with a total ascent of 1,150 metres (3,770 ft).

Shorter versions can be made by omitting Yewbarrow and Kirk Fell, at start and finish, and (perhaps) the summit of Scoat Fell.

== Wainwright's warning ==
Alfred Wainwright placed the round among his dozen best lakeland ridge walks; but also warned that the full version was "an exhilarating mountain marathon for experienced fellwalkers only".

== See also ==
- Black Crag
- Coledale horseshoe
- Fairfield horseshoe
- Mosedale Beck (Wast Water)
