= Western Fells =

Region of the Cumbrian Mountains

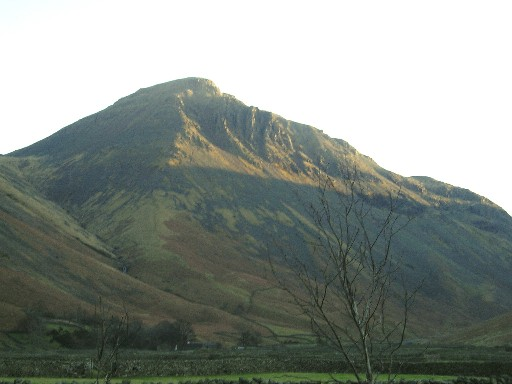
Great Gable from Wasdale

The Western Fells are a part of the Cumbrian Mountains in the Lake District of England. Centred on Great Gable, they occupy a triangular area between Buttermere and Wasdale. The Western Fells have high ridges and an abundance of naked rock.

== Partition of the Lakeland Fells ==
The Lake District is a National Park in the north west of the country which, in addition to its lakes, contains a complex range of hills. These are known locally as fells, and range from low hills to the highest ground in England. There are hundreds of tops, and many writers have attempted to draw up definitive lists. In doing so the compilers frequently divide the range into smaller areas to aid their description.

The most influential of all such authors was Alfred Wainwright, whose Pictorial Guide to the Lakeland Fells series has sold in excess of 2 million copies, being in print continuously since the first volume was published in 1952. Wainwright divided the fells into seven geographical areas, each surrounded by valleys and low passes. While any such division must be arbitrary, and later writers have deviated to a greater or lesser extent from this blueprint, Wainwright's sevenfold division remains the best known partitioning of the fells into "sub ranges", each with its own characteristics. The Western Fells are one of these divisions, covered by volume 7 of Wainwright's work.

== Boundaries ==
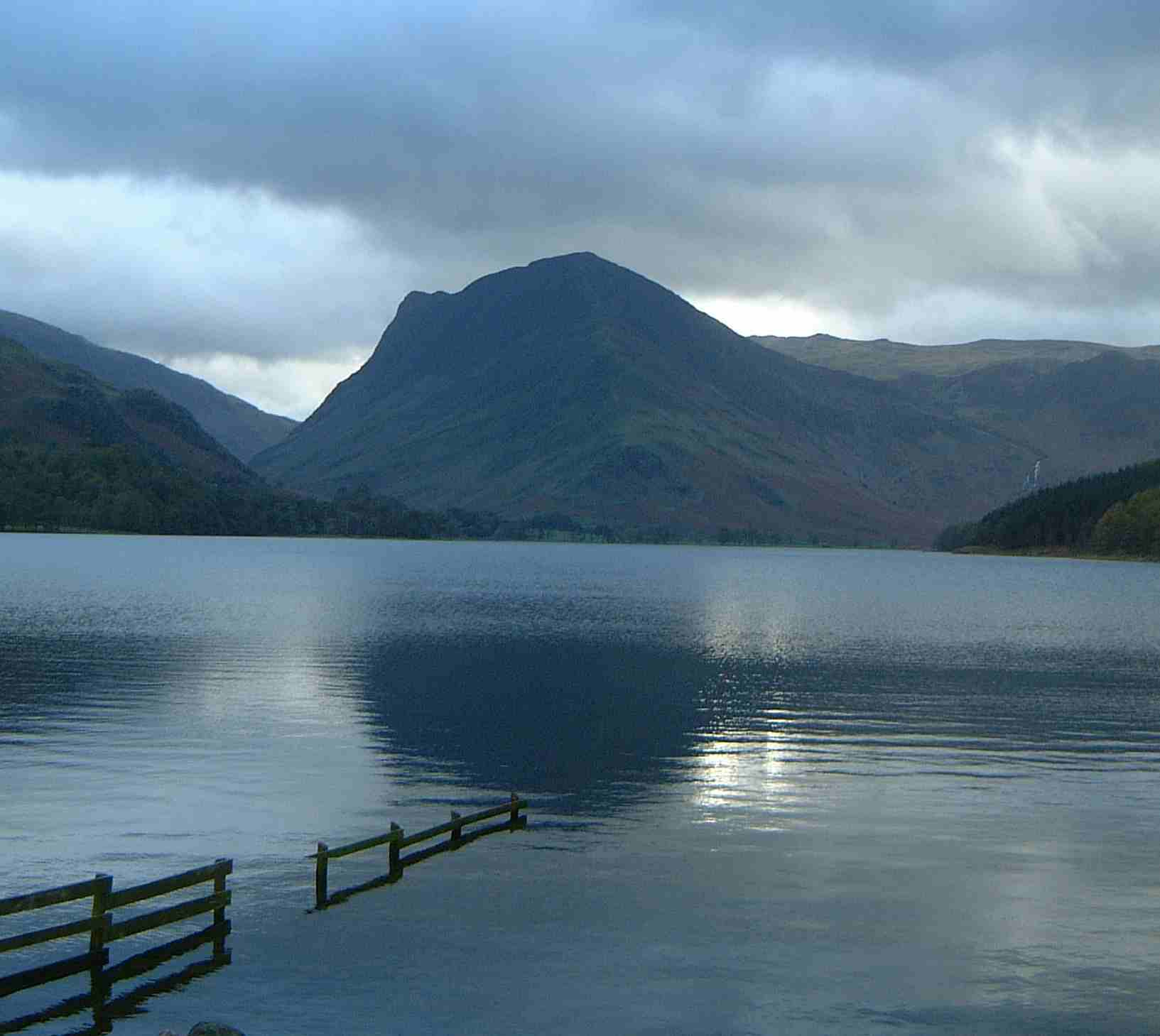
Fleetwith Pike across Buttermere

The Western Fells rise gradually from the Cumbrian coastal plain, Wainwright excluding some of the lower specimens nearest the sea. He drew a complex and arbitrary dividing line part way between his intended border at the extremity of the major lakes, and the more distant boundary of the National Park. The few hills thus excluded were covered later in his supplementary volume, The Outlying Fells of Lakeland (1974). The inner boundary is by contrast well defined. The River Cocker runs along the north eastern edge and Wasdale to the south east. In the acute angle where these valleys converge, the border is marked by headwaters of Borrowdale, closing the gap between Honister Pass and Sty Head. Honister connects to the North Western Fells and Sty Head to the Southern.

== Topography ==
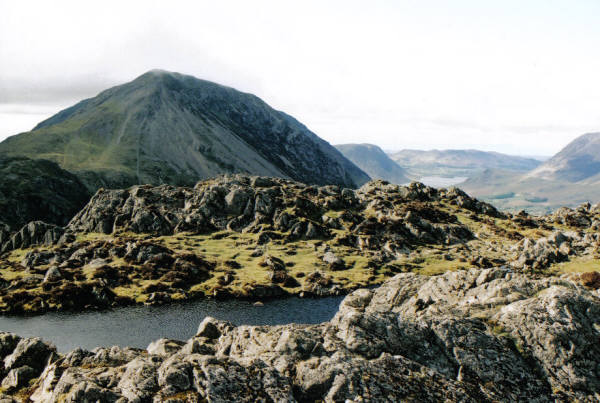
High Crag from the summit of Haystacks

The Western Fells form the southern wall of the Buttermere valley and the northern fence of Wasdale. Between the two lies Ennerdale, so that in effect the group is the shape of a single horseshoe, each branch about 10 miles (16 km) in length.

At the head of Ennerdale stands Great Gable, the highest of the Western Fells at 2,949 feet (899 m). More commonly thought of as a Wasdale Fell, its profile from that valley gives it its name. The southern arc of the group travels due west from Great Gable, the main ridge consisting of Kirk Fell, Pillar (named for its great out-thrust of rock), Scoat Fell, Haycock and Caw Fell. A number of outliers line the side valleys of Wasdale, namely Yewbarrow, Red Pike (Wasdale), Seatallan, Middle Fell and Buckbarrow. Beyond Caw Fell is the lower Lank Rigg group, consisting of Lank Rigg, Crag Fell and Grike.

The northern arc begins with Great Gable's lesser sibling, Green Gable, and Brandreth, before turning north west above the shore of Buttermere. First comes Haystacks, Wainwright's favourite fell and the resting place of his ashes. Next are High Crag, High Stile and Red Pike (Buttermere), the three fells of Buttermere Edge. These are connected by narrow soaring ridges and shelter dark coombes from the sunlight. The wild and rocky character of the range then gradually diminishes with Starling Dodd and Great Borne, before crossing the pedestrian Floutern Pass to the Loweswater Fells. These are Mellbreak, brooding darkly above Crummock Water, Hen Comb, Gavel Fell, Blake Fell and Burnbank Fell. The final extremity of the northern arc curves around the head of Loweswater to Low Fell and Fellbarrow. The satellites of the main ridge, Base Brown, Grey Knotts and Fleetwith Pike, centre upon Brandreth.

== Access for walkers ==
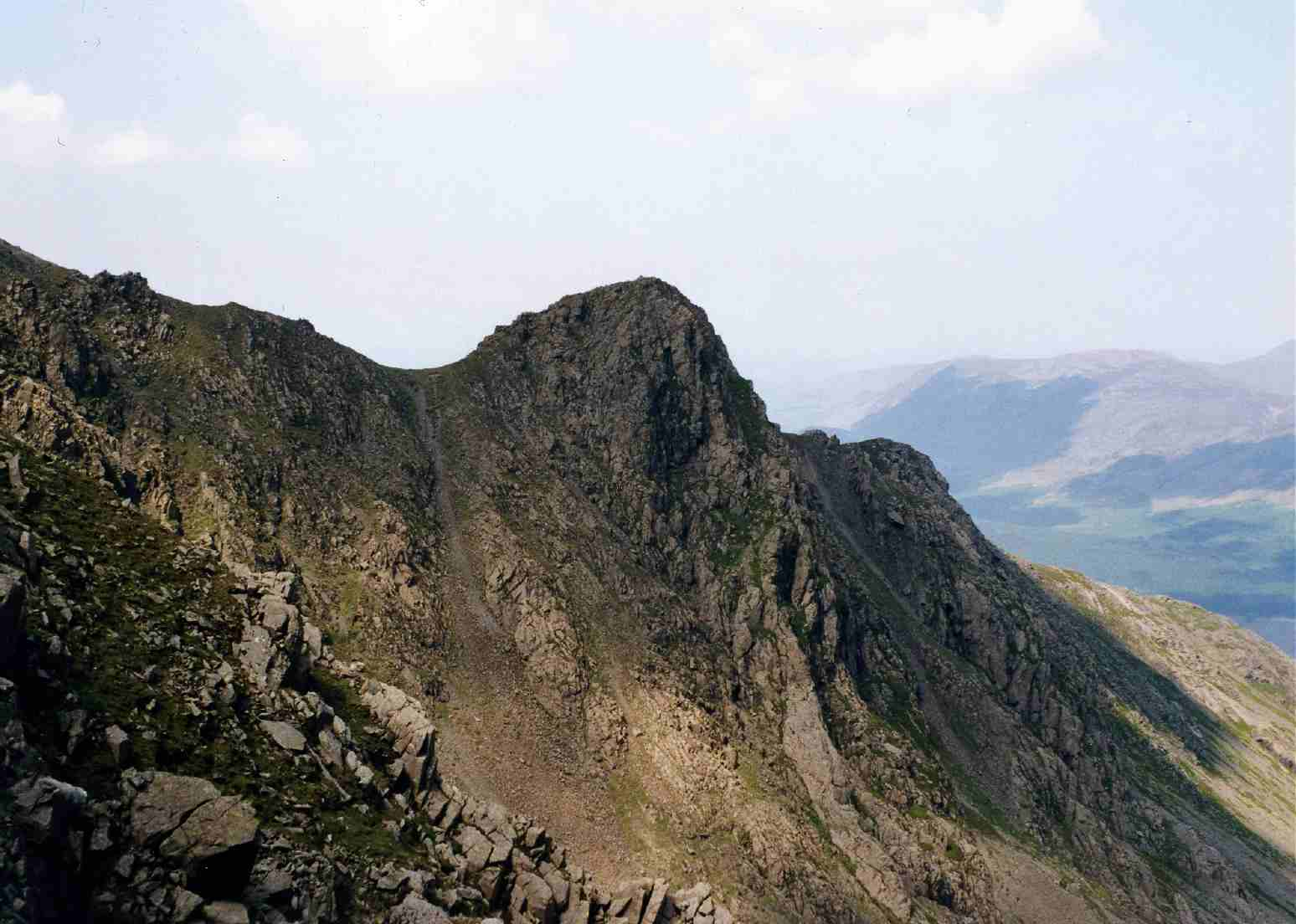
Steeple from Wind Gap

Ennerdale almost bisects the Western Fells, but access for cars barely penetrates the valley. At its head however is Black Sail Hut, England's most remote Youth Hostel. Great Gable and its neighbours can be reached from Wasdale Head, Seathwaite, Honister Pass or Gatesgarth (Buttermere). Access to the northern arc is continuous along the Buttermere valley although the southern arc is more remote, particularly as the ridge gradually moves away from Wasdale.

== See also ==
- Eastern Fells
- Far Eastern Fells
- Central Fells
- Southern Fells
- Northern Fells
- North Western Fells
