= Grike =

Grike, may refer to:

- Grike or gryke, a feature of limestone pavements
- Grike (Lake District), a hill in the English Lake District
- Grike, a character in the Mortal Engines Quartet
