= Caw Fell =

Fell in the Lake District, Cumbria, England

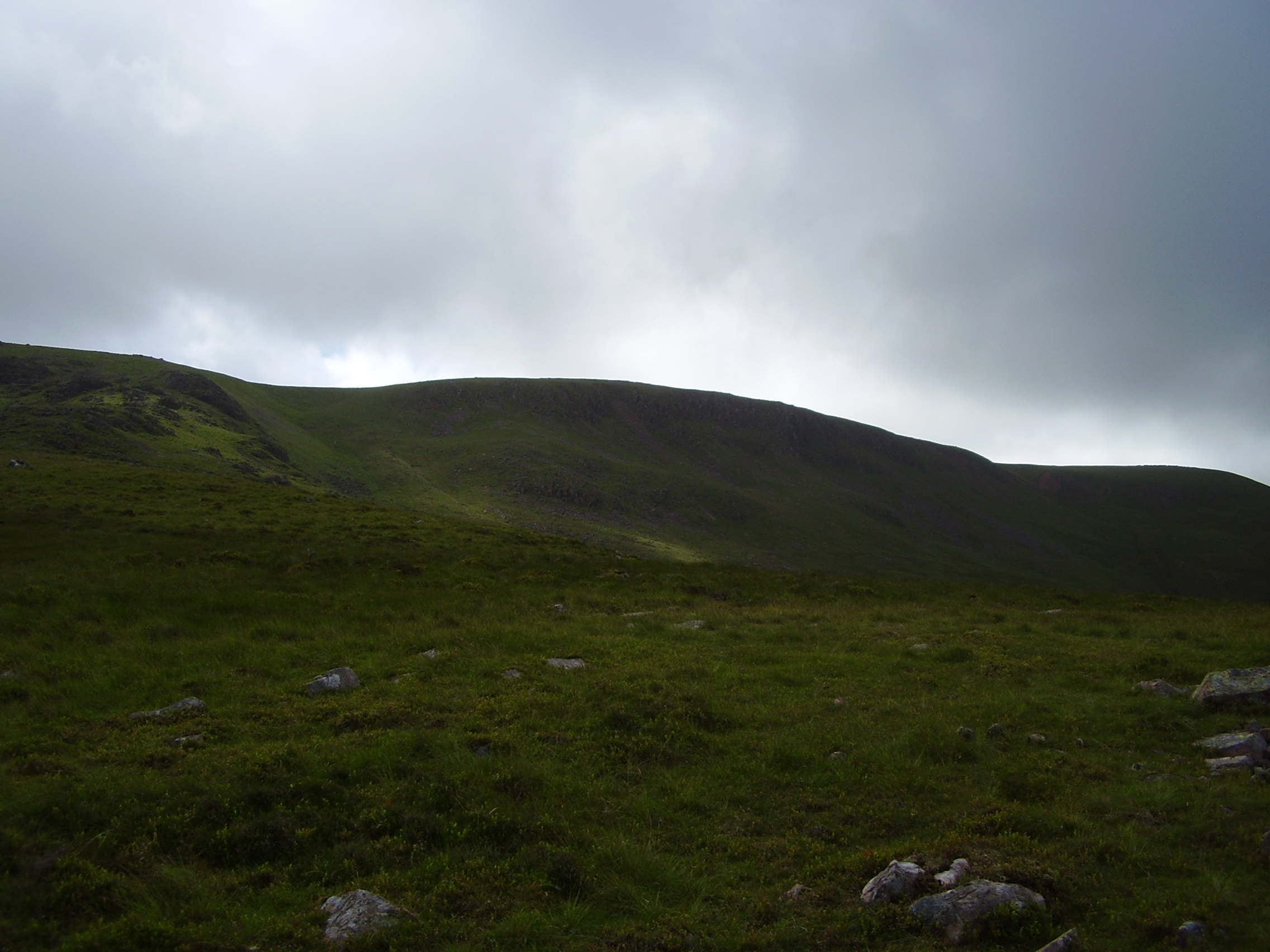
- Caw Fell from the ridge leading up from Ennerdale

Highest point
- Elevation: 697 m (2,287 ft)
- Prominence: c. 22 m
- Parent peak: Haycock
- Listing: Wainwright, Nuttall
- Coordinates: 54°29′10″N 3°20′35″W

Geography
- Location within the Lake District Location within the former Borough of Copeland
- Location: Cumbria, England
- Parent range: Lake District, Western Fells
- OS grid: NY132109
- Topo map: OS Landranger 89, 90, Explorer OL4, OL6

Listed summits of Caw Fell
Name	Grid ref	Height	Status
Iron Crag	NY123119	640 m (2,100 ft)	Hewitt

Caw Fell is a fell in the English Lake District, standing between Haycock the Lank Rigg group. It occupies a wide upland area with Ennerdale to the north and Blengdale to the south. Caw Fell is distant from any point of access by Lakeland standards, but can be climbed from Blengdale or Bowness Knott car-parks.

== Topography ==
The Western Fells occupy a triangular sector of the Lake District, bordered by the River Cocker to the north east and Wasdale to the south east. Westwards the hills diminish toward the coastal plain of Cumberland. At the central hub of the high country are Great Gable and its satellites, while two principal ridges fan out on either flank of Ennerdale, the western fells in effect being a great horseshoe around this long wild valley. Caw Fell stands on the southern arm.

The main watershed runs broadly westwards from Great Gable, dividing the headwaters of Ennerdale and Wasdale. The main fells in this section are Kirk Fell, Pillar, Scoat Fell, Haycock and Caw Fell. The surrounding valleys gradually diverge until at Caw Fell they are 6 miles (10 km) apart and other rivers spring up to drain the intervening country. The Bleng rises to the south of Caw Fell, while Worm Gill drains the western slopes. The fell is therefore the end of the westerly run of the ridge, and the watershed curves north around the head of Worm Gill, crossing the subsidiary top of Iron Crag on the transit to Crag Fell and Lank Rigg.

The unnamed col connecting Caw Fell to Haycock is flat topped and carries the Ennerdale Fence, in this section a substantial dry stone wall. Tongue Gill, the principal headwater of the Bleng, flows from the southern side of the saddle while on the opposite side is the steep headwall of Silver Cove, a deeply enclosed side-valley running into Ennerdale. The heathery spur of Tongue End runs parallel to the east.

West of the summit a broad ridge descends steeply to Worm Gill, a craggy bowl scooped out on the northern side above the tributary of Bleaberry Gill. Running due north between this corrie and Silver Cove is the ridge of Iron Crag, making the whole summit area resemble an inverted 'T' in plan. A narrow and steep sided col at 1,575 feet (480 m) provides Iron Crag with considerably more prominence than its parent, a small tarn lying on the northern slope. The rock face giving Iron Crag its name overlooks Silver Cove, but is not particularly prominent. From this top the ridge swings west again, the rough northern flanks running above the shore of Ennerdale Water. The main features here are Mart Knott, Stair Knott and Boat How. The ridge now meets the headwaters of the River Calder and divides to embrace the valley, Crag Fell to the north and Lank Rigg to the south.

Caw Fell also has a lower level south west ridge, running down between the River Bleng and Worm Gill. This descends first to Stockdale Moor, a site littered with tumuli, hut circles, enclosures and other remnants of ancient habitation. Beyond are the low hills centred on Ponsonby Fell at 1,033 feet (315 m), not included by Alfred Wainwright in his influential Pictorial Guide to the Lakeland Fells, but covered by other guidebooks.

== Geology ==
The north eastern flanks are overlain by drift deposits with the plagioclase-phyric andesite lavas of the Birker Fell Formation beneath. The rest of the fell exhibits rock of the Ennerdale Intrusion, granophyric granite.

Iron Crag Mine operated below the crag of that name from around 1864 to 1896. 500 tons of haematite ore was raised in 1881, but the mine never proved a commercial success. Other smaller operations ran briefly in Silver Cove and Deep Gill.

== Summit ==
The top stands to the north of the wall, marked by a cairn. Caw Fell is remote from higher fells and gives an all round panorama of the Western Fells and the Scafells. It is necessary to cross the wall to take in the full view.

== Ascents ==
The south west ridge over Stockdale Moor can be followed from the car park at Bleng Bridge, this being over five miles (8 km) each way. From Bowness Knott in Ennerdale, Caw Fell can be reached in a similar distance via the Tongue End spur. Indirect ascents can be made via Grike and Crag Fell from the Kinniside Stone Circle.

== Gallery ==
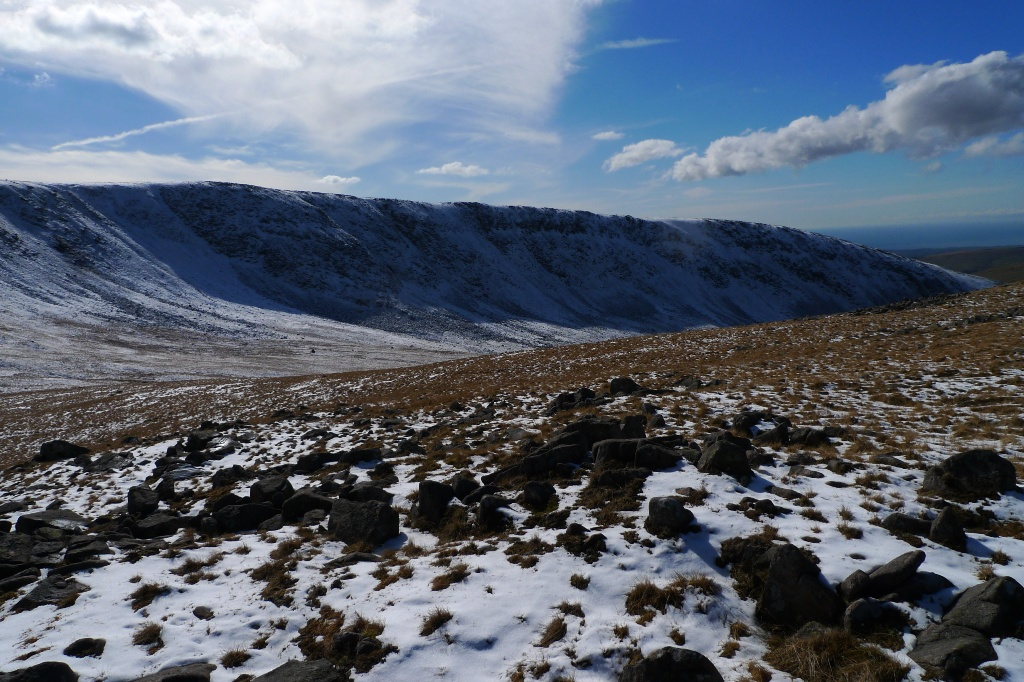
Caw Fell from Iron Crag
