= Scoat Fell =

Mountain in the English Lake District, Cumbria, England

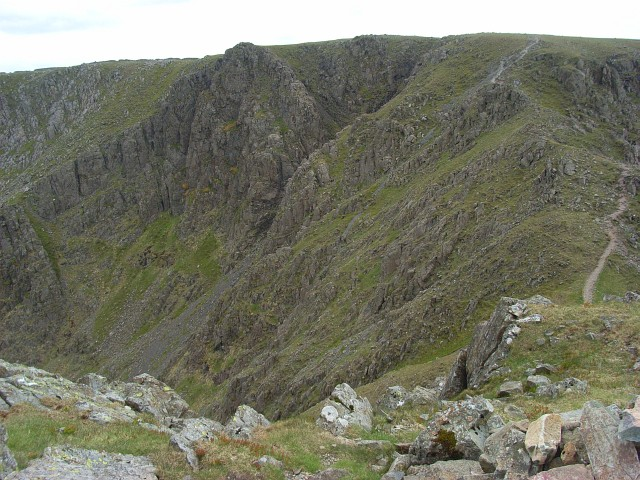

Highest point
- Elevation: 841 m (2,759 ft)
- Prominence: c. 46 m
- Parent peak: Pillar
- Listing: Nuttall, Hewitt, Wainwright
- Coordinates: 54°29′24″N 3°17′59″W

Geography
- Location within the Lake District Location within the former Borough of Copeland
- Location: Cumbria, England
- Parent range: Lake District, Western Fells
- OS grid: NY159113
- Topo map: OS Landranger 89, Explorer OL4

Listed summits of Scoat Fell
| Name | Grid ref | Height | Status |
|---|---|---|---|
| Black Crag | NY165116 | 828 m (2,717 ft) | Hewitt |

Scoat Fell is a fell in the western part of the English Lake District. It stands at the head of the Mosedale Horseshoe with its back to Ennerdale. Paths lead to Scoat Fell from Ennerdale over Steeple, from Wasdale over Red Pike, and along the ridge from Pillar.

== Topography ==
The Western Fells occupy a triangular sector of the Lake District, bordered by the River Cocker to the north east and Wasdale to the south east. Westwards the hills diminish toward the coastal plain of Cumberland. At the central hub of the high country are Great Gable and its satellites, while two principal ridges fan out on either flank of Ennerdale, the western fells in effect being a great horseshoe around this long wild valley. Scoat Fell is on the southern arm.

The main watershed runs broadly westwards from Great Gable, dividing the headwaters of Ennerdale and Wasdale. The principal fells in this section are Kirk Fell, Pillar, Scoat Fell, Haycock and Caw Fell, followed by the lower Lank Rigg group.

Scoat Fell occupies an important position at the crossroads of five ridges. To the east, across the subsidiary top of Black Crag, is Pillar. Southward is a long descending ridge heading toward the shore of Wastwater. The high point is Red Pike, before the terminal height of Yewbarrow. The main watershed continues west to Haycock, while two short spurs jut north into Ennerdale. These are Tewit How which descends from the western end of the plateau and Steeple, running from the summit.

As the radial point of so many ridges Scoat Fell forms the head of several valleys, the major ones being the Wasdale feeders of Mosedale and Nether Beck. Mosedale begins on the eastern flanks of Scoat Fell, between Red Pike and Pillar, in the hollow of Black Comb. There are crags in the headwall, particularly to the south. Nether Beck has its birth at Scoat Tarn, a large pool to the south of the fell. This corrie tarn, held in place by grassy moraines is around 65 ft deep. Between Steeple and Pillar to the north is Windgap Cove with Black Crag, a Hewitt at its head. Wind Gap is the col between Black Crag and Pillar, while the small Mirk Cove lies between Black Crag and the summit. Finally Mirklin Cove is the corrie between Steeple and Tewit How, drained into Ennerdale by Low Beck. All of the northern coves are home to impressive crags.

Of Scoat Fell's various satellites, Little Scoat Fell and Black Fell are generally considered to be a part of the parent fell, while Steeple, despite its clearly derivative position, is counted as a separate fell. This is due to its impressive appearance from Ennerdale rather than any great relative height, a triumph of the emotions over logic.

== Geology ==
Successive rock strata are displayed along the descending ridge of Tewit How to the north west, displaying the architecture of the fell. At the top is the plagioclase-phyric andesite lava of the Birker Fell Formation, followed by the siltstone, sandstone, conglomerate, tuff and lapilli tuff of the Eagle Crag Member. Further outcrops of the Birker Fell Formation are followed by a band of dacite before the igneous rocks of the Ennerdale Intrusion complete the picture.

== Summit ==
The top is a long plateau, running broadly east to west. Along it runs the stone wall of the Ennerdale fence, crossing the summit exactly. Purists have built a small cairn atop the wall, although a larger edifice lies just to the north, pointing the way to Steeple. The whole area is stony, with fine views into the northern coves. Ordnance Survey maps label the summit as Little Scoat Fell and a small hillock at the western end of the plateau as Great Scoat Fell. These names are based on area rather than height, Great Scoat Fell being 130 feet (40 m) lower.

Pillar reduces the field of view, without showing its better side, but almost the full horseshoe of the Western Fells can be seen. The wall makes it difficult to observe the full panorama from one point.

== Ascents ==
From Ennerdale many walkers will ascend indirectly via Steeple, but the ridge of Tewit How can also be used. Wasdale Head can be used as a base, first walking up Mosedale and then climbing up to the ridge via Black Comb. Finally Nether Beck Bridge on the shore of Wastwater provides access via Scoat Tarn onto the southern flanks. From the upper recesses of Nether Beck the walker can aim for either of the cols which connect the objective to Red Pike or Haycock. Perhaps the greatest number of visitors will cross the top as part of the Mosedale Horseshoe, also climbing Red Pike and Pillar.
