= Kirk Fell =

Fell in the Lake District, England

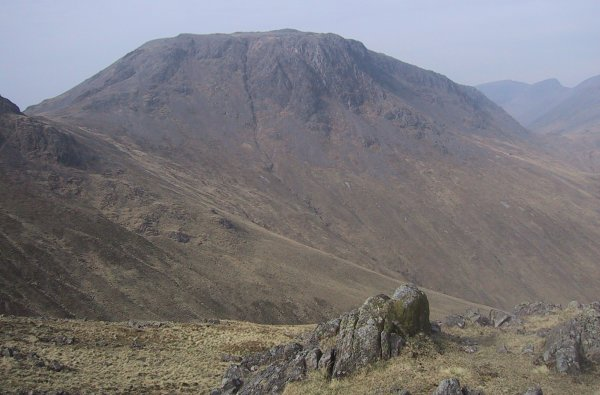
- Kirk Fell from Moses Trod by Ann Bowker

Highest point
- Elevation: 802 m (2,631 ft)
- Prominence: 181 m (594 ft)
- Parent peak: Great Gable
- Listing: Marilyn, Wainwright, Hewitt, Nuttall
- Coordinates: 54°28′59″N 3°14′31″W

Naming
- English translation: Hill above the church
- Language of name: Old English

Geography
- Location within the Lake District Location within the former Borough of Copeland
- Location: Cumbria, England
- Parent range: Lake District, Western Fells
- OS grid: NY195104
- Topo map: OS Landranger 89, 90, Explorer OL4

Listed summits of Kirk Fell
| Name | Grid ref | Height | Status |
|---|---|---|---|
| Kirk Fell East Top | NY199107 | 787 m (2,582 ft) | Hewitt |

Kirk Fell is a fell in the Western part of the English Lake District. It is situated between Great Gable and Pillar on the long ring of fells surrounding the valley of Ennerdale, and also stands over Wasdale to the south. However, it is separated from its two higher neighbours by the low passes of Black Sail and Beck Head, giving it a high relative height and making it a Marilyn, the thirteenth highest in the Lake District.

The direct ascent up the south-western slope from Wasdale Head is exceptionally steep and the subject of an amusing drawing by Wainwright. Usual ascents are by one of the aforementioned passes; alternatively one may climb Kirk Fell as part of the Mosedale Horseshoe, a walk on the fells surrounding Mosedale, a side-valley of Wasdale.

== Topography ==
The Western Fells occupy a triangular sector of the Lake District, bordered by the River Cocker to the north-east and Wasdale to the south-east. Westwards the hills diminish toward the coastal plain of Cumberland. At the central hub of the high country are Great Gable and its satellites, while two principal ridges fan out on either flank of Ennerdale, the western fells in effect being a great horseshoe around this long wild valley. Kirk Fell is the first on the southern arm.

The main watershed runs broadly westwards from Great Gable, dividing the headwaters of Ennerdale and Wasdale. The main fells in this section are Kirk Fell, Pillar, Scoat Fell, Haycock and Caw Fell, followed by the lower Lank Rigg group.

Kirk Fell sits squarely at the head of Wasdale, rising between the main headstreams of Mosedale and Lingmell Becks. From this direction it appears as a truncated cone, steep sided with a wide level top. The flanks above Wasdale are unremittingly steep, 2,000 ft (600 m) of grass and scree with little to break the monotony. The only stream on these slopes is Ill Gill, falling from the depression between the summit and the east top.

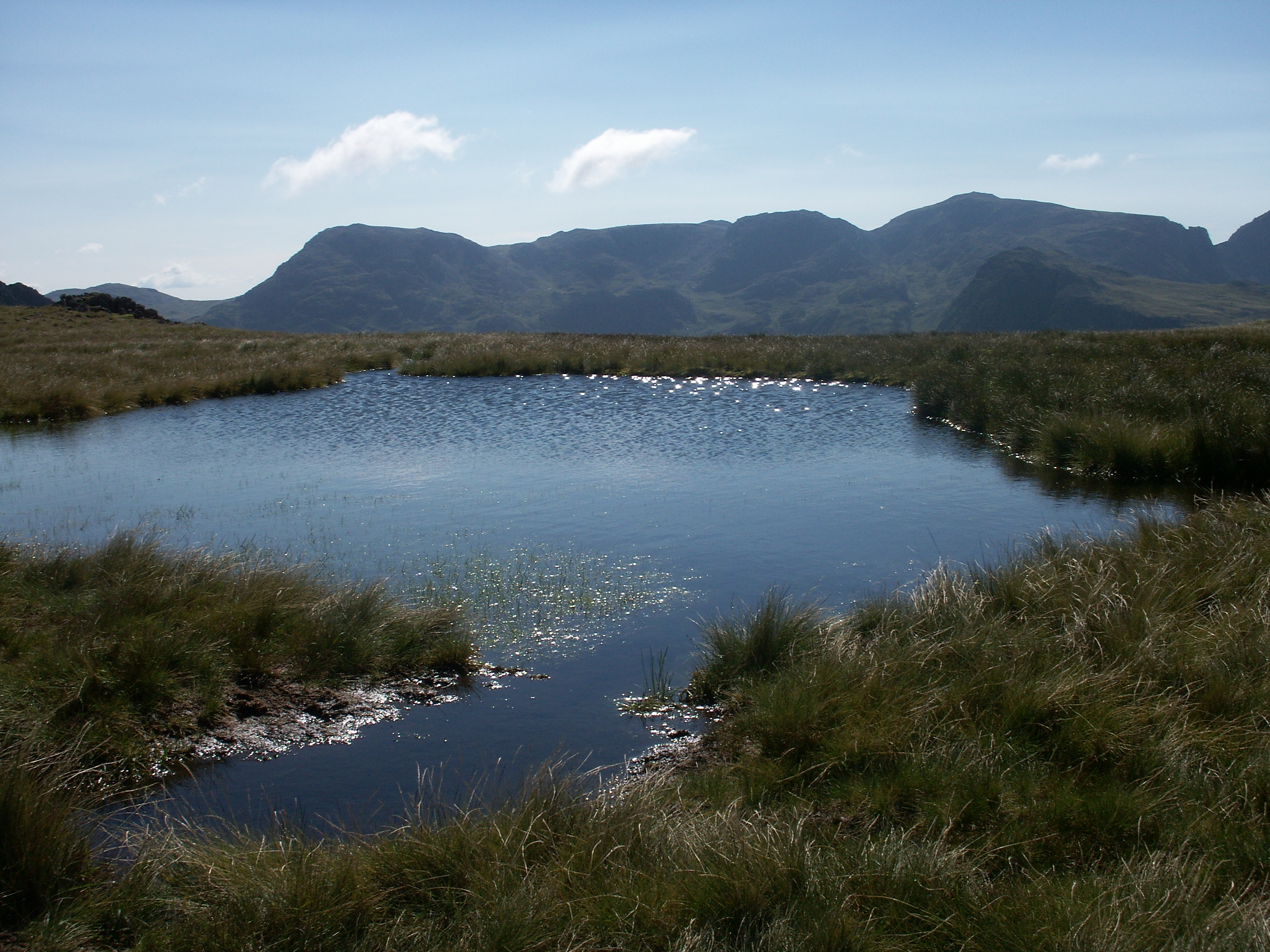
Great End and Scafell Pike seen from Kirk Fell Tarn between the two summits

To the west, between Kirk Fell and Pillar, is Black Sail Pass. This is a pedestrian route from Wasdale to Ennerdale, and from there onward via Scarth Gap to Buttermere. A well-graded path now used exclusively for leisure, it was once a thoroughfare for trade between the valleys. The summit of the pass at 1,775 ft (541 m) is crossed by the Ennerdale Fence, a boundary marking the watershed around the head of the valley. Although some sections of the 'fence' are actually stone walls, that running over the top of Kirk Fell is only a remnant, marked by occasional posts.

The Ennerdale face of Kirk Fell has more features to offer, but due to the remoteness of the dalehead is much less familiar. A wall of rock rims the summit plateau, Boat How Crags to the east and Kirkfell Crags to the west. Between the two is the hollow of Baysoar Slack, the birthplace of Sail Beck. Below the crags the gradient is not quite as severe as on the Wasdale side, slopes running down to the bank of the River Liza. Kirk Fell does not have such a prominent position in Ennerdale, Great Gable standing at the head of the valley.

To the east of Kirk Fell is Beck Head (2,020 feet, 620 m), the col connecting to Great Gable. A small rocky spur, Rib End, runs down from the summit plateau to the tarns at the depression. Although prominently named on Ordnance Survey maps, Beckhead Tarn is a small shallow pool with a bed of peat and submerged flags. A second smaller pool forms after heavy rain.

The summit plateau of Kirk Fell assumes a 'figure of eight' shape in plan, the narrow waist squeezed between Illgill Head and Baysoar Slack. The highest ground is to the west, while a subsidiary top occupies the other section. Kirk Fell East Top has sufficient prominence (34 metres, 112 ft) to qualify as a Hewitt in its own right. Between the summits is Kirkfell Tarn, actually two small tarns. The deeper pool is an oval, while the other has an indented outline, reminiscent of Sprinkling Tarn on Seathwaite Fell in miniature.

== Geology ==
The summit area consists of drift deposits overlying the plagioclase-phyric andesite lavas and subordinate sills of the Birker Fell Formation. The northern crags expose some granophyric granite of the Ennerdale Intrusion, together with the bedded breccias, sandstones and tuffs of the Round How Member.

== Summit ==
The main top is marked by a cairn set amid an area of stones. The east top has a cairn set on a rocky outcrop. Some remains of the old fence can be found on the watershed, crossing both tops.

Great Gable fills the eastern view, with Gable Crag and the Napes seen in profile. Across Wasdale rise the Scafells, while the High Stile and Grasmoor ranges are visible in the other direction. There are also distant views of the Skiddaw and Helvellyn ranges.

== Ascents ==
A path of sorts ascends direct from the village of Wasdale Head to the summit, the way being in Wainwright's words a relentless and unremitting treadmill, a turf clutching crawl, not a walk. There are only three opportunities of standing upright…. More conventional ascents can be made via Black Sail or Beck Head, the former providing easier gradients. Black Sail can also be used to give access from Ennerdale, although unless staying at Black Sail Youth Hostel, the nearest access in this direction is actually Gatesgarth via Scarth Gap.

Kirk Fell can also be climbed as part of the Mosedale Horseshoe, also taking in Yewbarrow, Red Pike, Scoat Fell and Pillar.

On 3 June 2022 Mitchell Dixon, Jordan Mcguirk and Matty Todd (All local to Cumbria) become the first known trio to climb the nose of Kirk fell repeatedly until they accumulated the same altitude as Mt Everest. 13 times up and down. They completed the challenge in under 3 days.
