= Pillar (Lake District) =

Mountain in the English Lake District, Cumbria, England

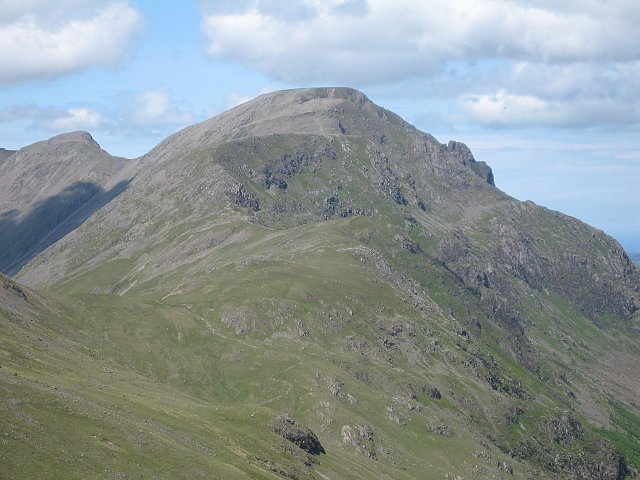
- Pillar from the east. Pillar Rock is clearly visible on the skyline on the right.

Highest point
- Elevation: 892 m (2,927 ft)
- Prominence: 348 m (1,142 ft)
- Parent peak: Great Gable
- Listing: Marilyn, Hewitt, Wainwright, Nuttall
- Coordinates: 54°29′49″N 3°16′55″W

Geography
- Location within the Lake District Location within the former Borough of Copeland
- Location: Cumbria, England
- Parent range: Lake District, Western Fells
- OS grid: NY171121
- Topo map: OS Landranger 89, Explorer OL4

Listed summits of Pillar (Lake District)
Name	Grid ref	Height	Status
Pillar Rock	NY171123	780 m (2,560 ft)	Nuttall
Looking Stead	NY186117	627 m (2,057 ft)	Nuttall

Pillar is a mountain in the western part of the English Lake District. Situated between the valleys of Ennerdale to the north and Wasdale to the south, it is the highest point of the Pillar group (some dozen fells clustered round it). At 892 metres (2,927 ft), it is the eighth-highest mountain in the Lake District. The fell takes its name from Pillar Rock, a prominent feature on the Ennerdale side, regarded as the birthplace of rock climbing in the district.

== Topography ==
The Western Fells occupy a triangular sector of the Lake District, bordered by the River Cocker to the north east and Wasdale to the south east. Westwards, the hills diminish toward the coastal plain of Cumberland. At the central hub of the high country are Great Gable and its satellites, while two principal ridges fan out on either flank of Ennerdale, the western fells in effect being a great horseshoe around this long, wild valley. Pillar is on the southern arm.

The main watershed runs broadly westwards from Great Gable, dividing the headwaters of Ennerdale and Wasdale. The principal fells in this section are Kirk Fell, Pillar, Scoat Fell, Haycock, and Caw Fell, followed by the lower Lank Rigg group.

Pillar stands on the southern wall of Ennerdale, three miles (five kilometres) from the head of the valley. Two tiers of impressive crags run the full length of the fell from Wind Gap in the west to Black Sail Pass in the east. The top tier fronts the summit ridge, a series of coves being interspersed between the buttresses. Below is a narrow terrace bearing the 'High Level Route' path and then a further wall including Pillar Rock, Raven and Ash Crags, and Proud Knott. The lower slopes are planted with a broad belt of conifers, extending across the River Liza to the flanks of High Crag.

The southern flank of Pillar looks down on Mosedale, the more westerly of Wasdale's two main feeder valleys. From Wasdale Head village, Pillar appears to stand at the head of Mosedale, but the valley curves out of sight, actually having its source on the slopes of Scoat Fell. The Mosedale slopes cannot compete with those above Ennerdale, although there is outcropping rock, particularly at Wistow Crags, Elliptical Crag, and Murl Rigg.

The summit of Pillar is at the western end, immediately above the descent to Wind Gap (2,475 ft or 754 m). This continues the watershed to Scoat Fell and beyond. A subsidiary spur branches off north-west of the summit, passing over White Pike before petering out in the Ennerdale Forest. The eastern ridge of Pillar stretches for about a mile, gradually descending before the final upthrust of Looking, Stead. This subsidiary top is listed as a Nuttall in its own right. Beyond is Black Sail Pass, a pedestrian route between Wasdale and the head of Ennerdale. Kirk Fell stands on the other side of the pass.

== Geology ==
The primary rock types in the summit area are the plagioclase-phyric andesite lavas of the Birker Fell Formation. Bands of volcaniclastic sandstone and andesite sills are also present. Rhyolite and lapilli tuff appear amongst the northern crags, with outcrops of the Craghouse Member on the north-west ridge.

== Ecology ==
Pillar and Ennerdale Fells are Sites of Special Scientific Interest.

== Summit ==
The summit is surprisingly wide and grassy, consisting of patches of stones interspersed with short turf. An Ordnance Survey triangulation column stands beside a cairn and windshelter. At the northern edge of the plateau, a further windshelter marks the descent to the mountain rescue stretcher-box and the High Level Route.

The view is excellent with all of the major fells except the Coniston range in sight. Loweswater and Ennerdale Water can be seen, together with Burnmoor Tarn. From the north windshelter, there is a striking view of the summit of Pillar Rock.

== Ascent routes ==
Pillar is usually climbed from Wasdale Head, by far the nearest road access. The simplest route involves taking the Black Sail Pass, the main foot pass between Wasdale and Ennerdale, to its highest point (around 545 metres, 1,788 ft), then ascending the mountain's relatively gentle east ridge. Greater interest may be obtained by branching off the ridge (at c. 640 m [2,100 ft]) onto the "High Level Route", a narrow path which traverses around Pillar's northern crags before approaching the summit from the north, affording good views of Pillar Rock. Many walkers based in Wasdale climb Pillar as part of the Mosedale Horseshoe, a circuit of the skyline one of Wasdale's side valleys, which also includes Scoat Fell, Red Pike, and Yewbarrow; Kirk Fell may also optionally be included.

Pillar may also be climbed from Ennerdale. From the YHA youth hostel at Black Sail at the head of the valley, it is a fairly short walk (around 1.5 km and 300 m of ascent, that is 1 mile and 980 ft of ascent) to the summit of Black Sail Pass, from where the same routes can be followed as described above. As Black Sail hostel is five or six miles (8 or 10 km) from the nearest public road, this approach is somewhat impractical to day-trippers (especially since the Ennerdale valley is itself remote from the main tourist centres of the Lake District), though attractive to those staying at the hostel. Alternatively, there are various paths up the mountain from lower down the valley, which offer the possibility of a closer acquaintance with the crags of the north face.

For strong walkers, other more accessible approaches are feasible, which have the advantage of being more accessible than Wasdale from major tourist centres such as Keswick. Firstly, from the Buttermere valley, climb then descend the Scarth Gap Pass between Gatesgarth and Black Sail, which then allows an ascent via Black Sail Pass as detailed above. The walk from Gatesgarth to the summit of Pillar and back involves over 1,200 metres (3,950 ft) of ascent, more if the High Level Route is taken.

Secondly, for a ten-mile (16 km) round trip from the Honister Pass, contour round the head of Ennerdale by following the Moses Trod footpath to Beck Head col between Great Gable and Kirk Fell, then taking the path under Kirk Fell to the head of Black Sail Pass, before proceeding, by either of the routes described above, to Pillar Rock or summit. A variation from the Honister Pass is to descend to Ennerdale via the good path (steps) alongside Loft Beck, then ascend Black Sail Pass as before.

== Pillar Rock ==
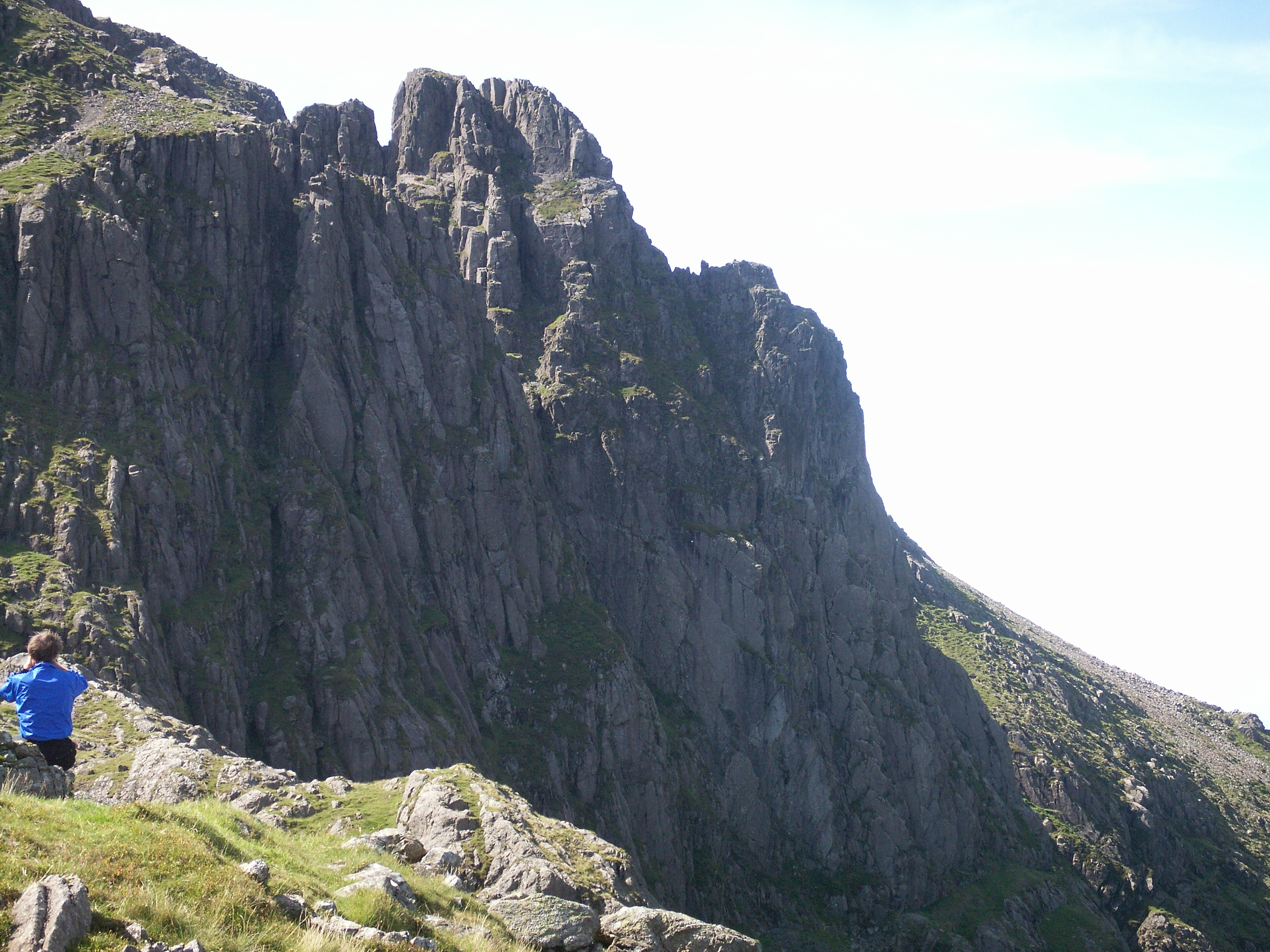
Pillar Rock from Robinson's Cairn

Pillar Rock is a large rocky outcrop surrounded by cliffs on the northern side of Pillar, well below the summit. When seen from Ennerdale, it looks like a tall and thin column, hence its name. In the early 19th century, it became widely known as one of the wonders of the Lake District, chiefly due to its featuring in William Wordsworth's poem The Brothers.

You see yon precipice—it almost looks

Like some vast building made of many crags,
And in the midst is one particular rock
That rises like a column from the vale,
Whence by our Shepherds it is call'd, the Pillar.

— Wordsworth, The Brothers

The first recorded ascent of Pillar Rock was made in 1826 by John Atkinson of Croftfoot, Ennerdale. His route, known as the Old West Route, is still classed as a rock climb, albeit one graded Moderate, the second lowest grade on the British system. It is the earliest recorded rock climb in the Lake District (not counting Coleridge's inadvertent descent of Scafell in 1802); subsequent Lakeland climbers also concentrated on Pillar, and by 1872 four different climbing routes had been pioneered on the rock. The easiest route to the top of Pillar Rock is now considered to be the Slab and Notch route, classed as a grade 3 scramble, whilst the classic route is the New West, classed as a Difficult rock climb. By 2007 over 90 climbs had been recorded, including 17 graded E1 or above.

By 1913, George Mallory, seconded by Alan Goodfellow, climbed Pillar Rock by what is now known as "Mallory's Route" – currently graded Hard Very Severe 5a (American grading 5.9) – similar in difficulty to The Second Step on Mount Everest. Pillar Rock has a topographic prominence of more than 15 metres (49 ft), and thus qualifies for the list of "Nuttalls" compiled by John and Anne Nuttall in their book The Mountains of England and Wales (see also Hill lists in the British Isles). It is the only summit on the list that cannot be reached without recourse to rock climbing.
