= Haycock (Lake District) =

Fell in the Lake District, Cumbria, England

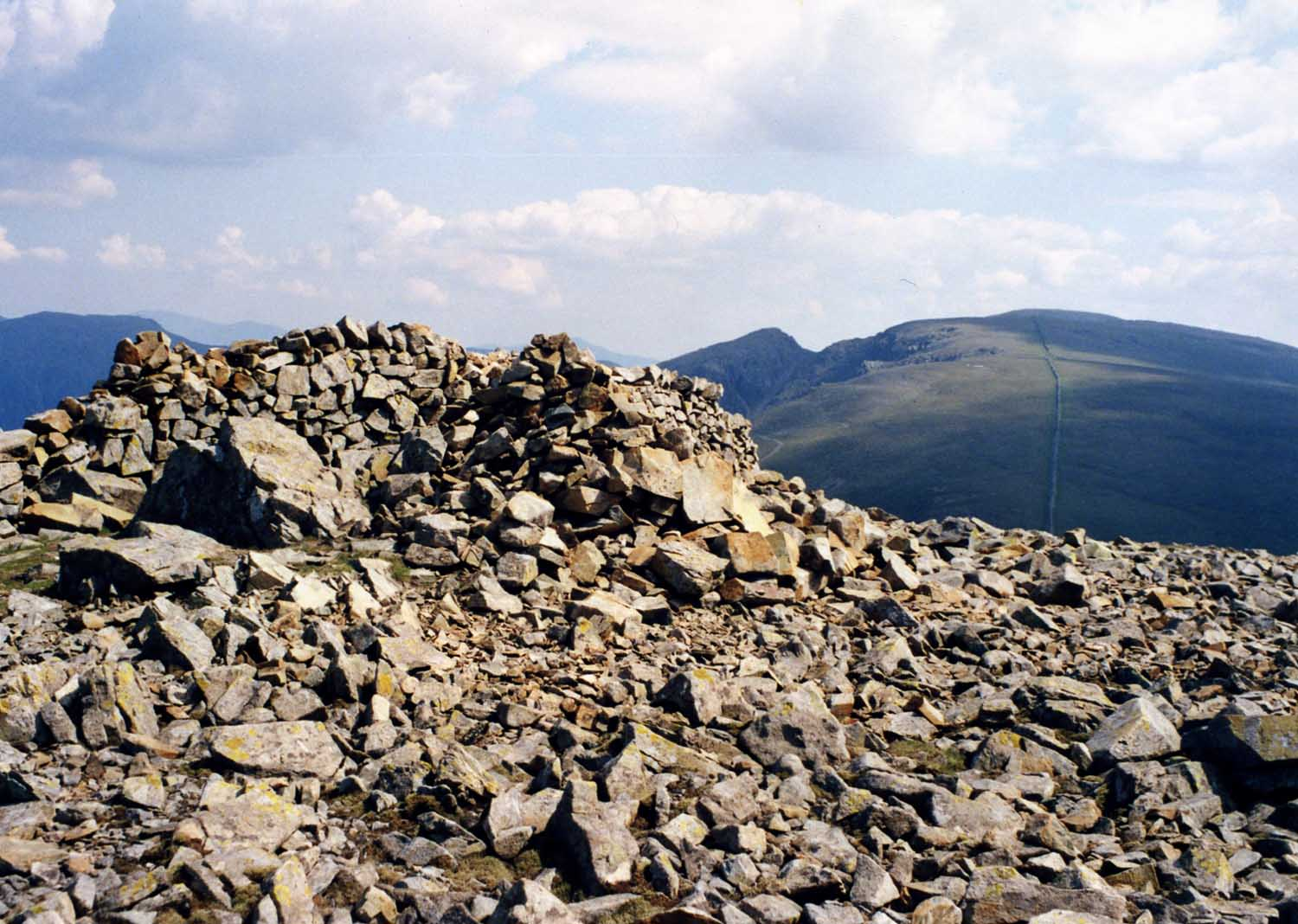
- The stony summit of Haycock with Scoat Fell and Steeple in the distance

Highest point
- Elevation: 797 m (2,615 ft)
- Prominence: c.94 m (308 ft)
- Parent peak: Pillar
- Listing: Hewitt, Nuttall, Wainwright
- Coordinates: 54°29′04″N 3°19′22″W

Geography
- Location within the Lake District Location within the former Borough of Copeland
- Location: Cumbria, England
- Parent range: Lake District, Western Fells
- OS grid: NY144107
- Topo map: OS Landranger 89, Explorer OL4

Listed summits of Haycock (Lake District)
Name	Grid ref	Height	Status
Little Gowder Crag	NY140109	733 m (2,405 ft)	Nuttall

Haycock is a mountain in the western part of the English Lake District. It rises between Scoat Fell and Caw Fell to the south of Ennerdale and the north of Wasdale. Haycock is an imposing dome-shaped fell, its popularity with walkers diminished somewhat by its remoteness. It can be climbed from either valley and offers fine mountain views.

== Topography ==
The Western Fells occupy a triangular sector of the Lake District, bordered by the River Cocker to the north-east and Wasdale to the south-east. Westwards the hills diminish toward the coastal plain of Cumberland. At the central hub of the high country are Great Gable and its satellites, while two principal ridges fan out on either flank of Ennerdale, the western fells in effect being a great horseshoe around this long wild valley. Haycock stands on the southern arm.

The main watershed runs broadly westwards from Great Gable, dividing the headwaters of Ennerdale and Wasdale. Travelling in this direction the major hills are Kirk Fell, Pillar, Scoat Fell, Haycock and Caw Fell. Haycock sends out a southern ridge to the neighbouring Seatallan.

The northern slopes of Haycock fall over crags into Great Cove, the birthplace of Deep Gill. This flows down through a belt of forestry into Ennerdale, just above the head of the lake. Great Cove is enclosed in the east by Tewit How, a rocky spur of neighbouring Scoat Fell. A similar spur closes in the other side, descending unnamed from Haycock. North-west of the summit, on the ridge continuing to Caw Fell, is Little Gowder Crag. This subsidiary top, listed as a Nuttall, has its rock face to the north of the ridge, appearing as a prominent knuckle in views from that side.

Haycock's southern flanks are bisected by the ridge to Seatallan and Middle Fell. This begins steeply over Gowder Crag and then broadens over High Pikehow before finally reaching the depression at Pots of Ashness (1,640 feet / 500 m). To the west is the head of the River Bleng, Haycock's daughter stream. This flows south-west for some miles, remote from habitation. Finally it joins the River Irt and enters the sea at Ravenglass. On the opposite side of the south ridge is the valley of Nether Beck, making straight for Wast Water.

== Geology ==
The summit area exhibits the plagioclase-phyric andesite lavas of the Birker Fell Formation. To the north are the siltstone, sandstone and tuff of the Eagle Crag Member, both containing andesite sills. Around High Pikehow are areas of Seatallan dacite.

== Summit ==
A wall, the Ennerdale Fence, runs along the watershed, crossing the top of the fell. There is a cairn on either side, that to the north being regarded as the nominal summit. The whole area is stony. Another cairn marks a viewpoint to the south.

The view is good for a fell so removed from the centre of the District. The Scafells are seen in profile, with Helvellyn and Skiddaw in the distance. Ennerdale Water is in view from the summit and Wast Water from the southern cairn.

== Ascents ==
From Ennerdale the natural line follows the unnamed spur to the west of Deep Gill, footpaths having been created through the forestry. A longer route follows the opposing spur of Tewit How, turning right when the col is reached. Netherbeck Bridge provides access from the shore of Wast Water, following the stream around the base of Middle Fell. Once Ladcrag Beck is reached, a more direct line can be taken up Haycock. From below the lake, the valley of Greendale Beck provides another alternative. Haycock may also be ascended indirectly, having first climbed Seatallan, Middle Fell or Scoat Fell.

== Gallery ==
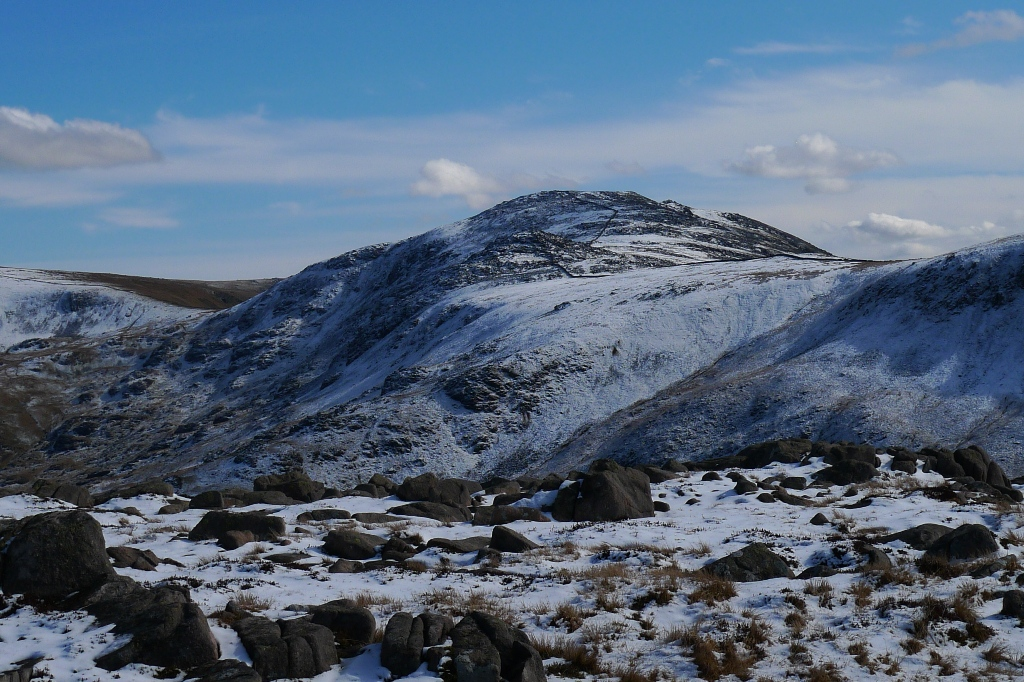
Haycock looking SE from Iron Crag

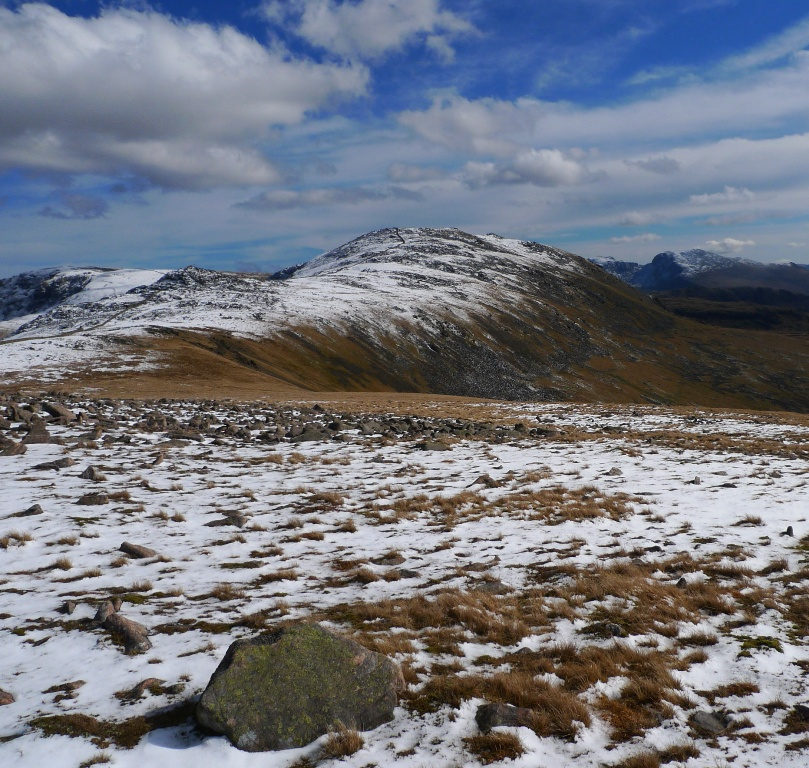
Haycock looking E from Caw Fell
