= Wasdale =

Valley in the Lake District, England

Coordinates: 54.425°N 3.350°W

- Nether Wasdale

- Location within Cumbria
- Population: 127 (2021 census)
- Civil parish: Wasdale
- Unitary authority: Cumberland
- Ceremonial county: Cumbria
- Region: North West
- Country: England
- Sovereign state: United Kingdom
- Police: Cumbria
- Fire: Cumbria
- Ambulance: North West

Wasdale (/ˈwɒzdeɪl/; traditionally /ˈwɒsəl, ˈwɒʃdəl/) is a valley and civil parish in the western part of the Lake District National Park in the Cumberland district, in the ceremonial county of Cumbria, England. The River Irt flows through the valley to its estuary at Ravenglass. A large part of the main valley floor is occupied by Wastwater, the deepest lake in England (258 feet or 79 metres). In 2021 the parish had a population of 127.

== Geographical features ==
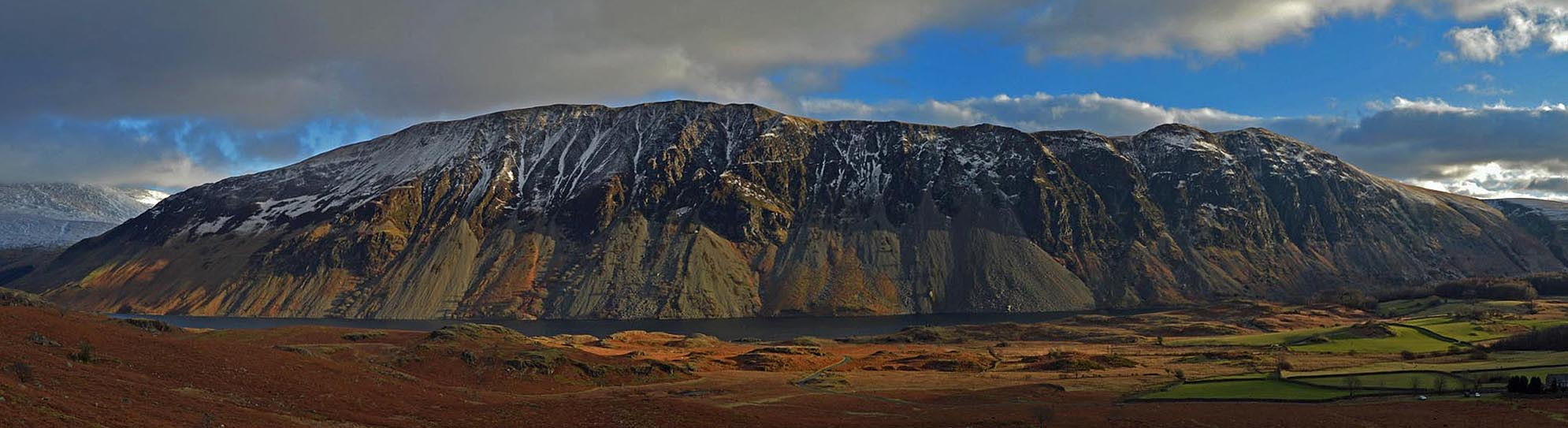
Panorama of the Wasdale screes, Illgill Head in the centre, Whin Rigg on the right.

On the south-eastern side of the lake are very steep screes below the summits of Whin Rigg and Illgill Head which are more accessible on the far side. The head of the valley is dominated by the Great Gable and Scafell Pike, the highest peak in England, which, along with Scafell, Kirk Fell and Yewbarrow, surround the small community of Wasdale Head. Wasdale is famous amongst rock climbers as the home of British rock climbing. A classic route is Nape's Needle on Great Gable.

== Settlements ==
At the hamlet of Wasdale Head is St Olaf's Church, one of the smallest churches in England.

Further down the valley are the villages of Strands and Gosforth.

== Fells ==
Clockwise from the north-west:-

- Seatallan
  - Buckbarrow
- Middle Fell
- Yewbarrow
- Red Pike
- Scoat Fell
- Pillar
- Kirk Fell
- Great Gable

Sty Head Pass

- Great End
- Scafell Pike
  - Lingmell
- Scafell
- Illgill Head
- Whin Rigg
  - Irton Pike

== Toponymy ==
The name came from Old Norse Vatnsdalr, which means "valley of the water". The alternative spelling "Wastdale" existed through much of the nineteenth century.

== Civil parish ==
The civil parish of Wasdale was historically a chapelry called Nether Wasdale within the larger ancient parish of St Bees. Nether Wasdale became a separate civil parish under the Poor Law Amendment Act 1866. The name of the civil parish remained Nether Wasdale until 2000, when it was changed to Wasdale.

Due to the low resident population of the parish there is no parish council, with the area instead having a parish meeting. The low population also means that since the 2011 Census separate population statistics for the parish have not been published.

== Gallery ==
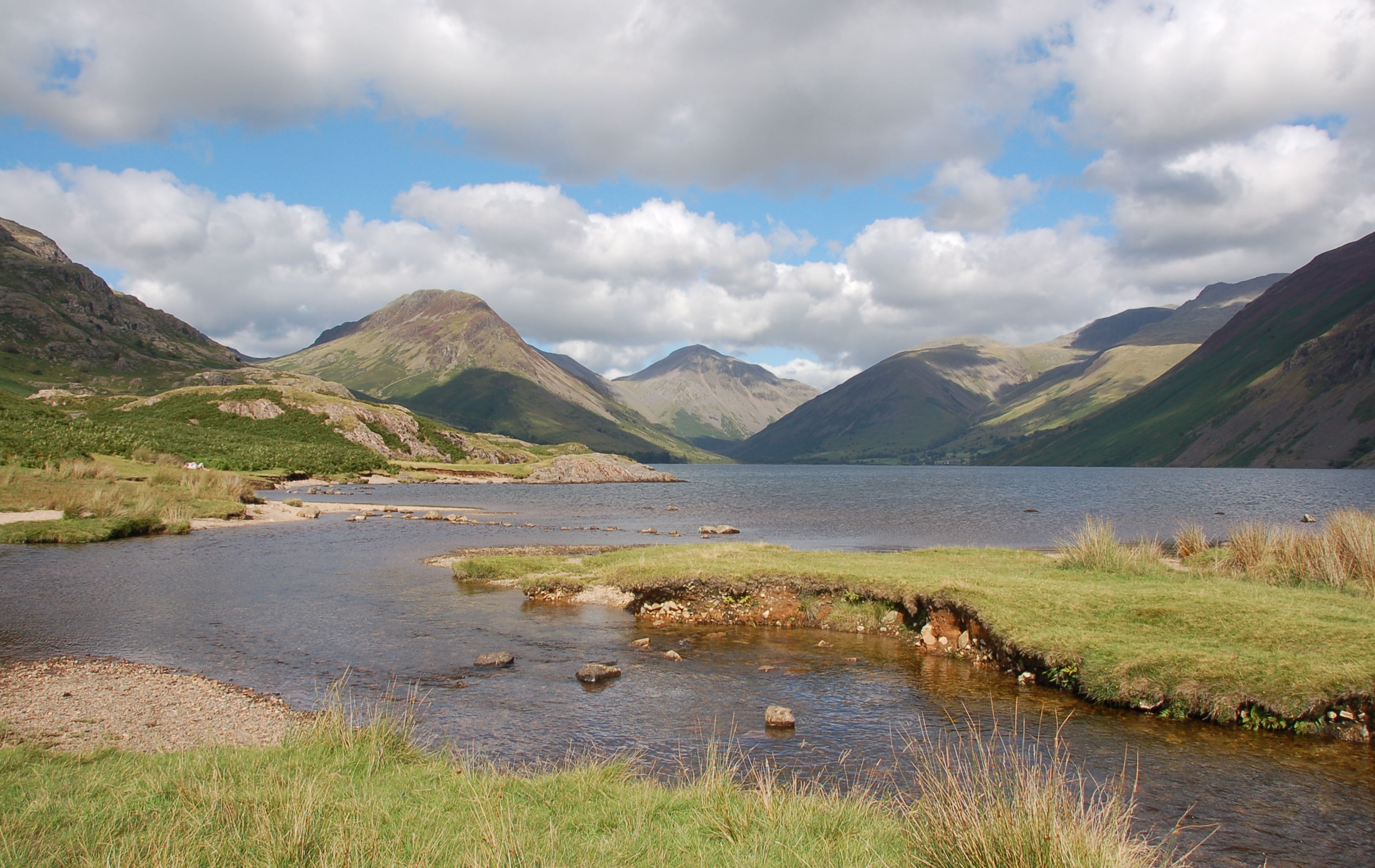
Wasdale from Wastwater

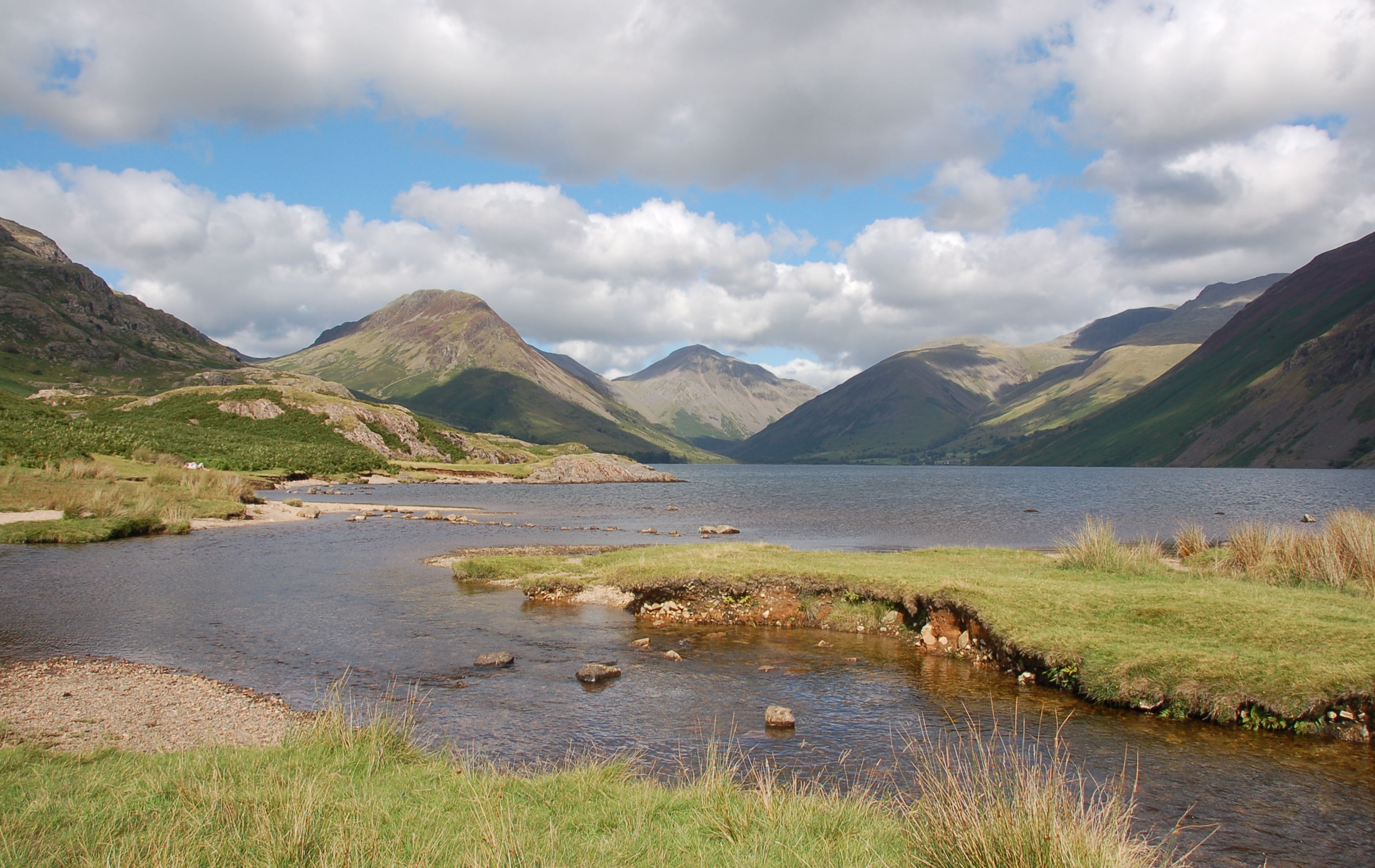
Wasdale from the shores of Wastwater. Yewbarrow is on the left, Great Gable in the centre and the Scafell range on the right.

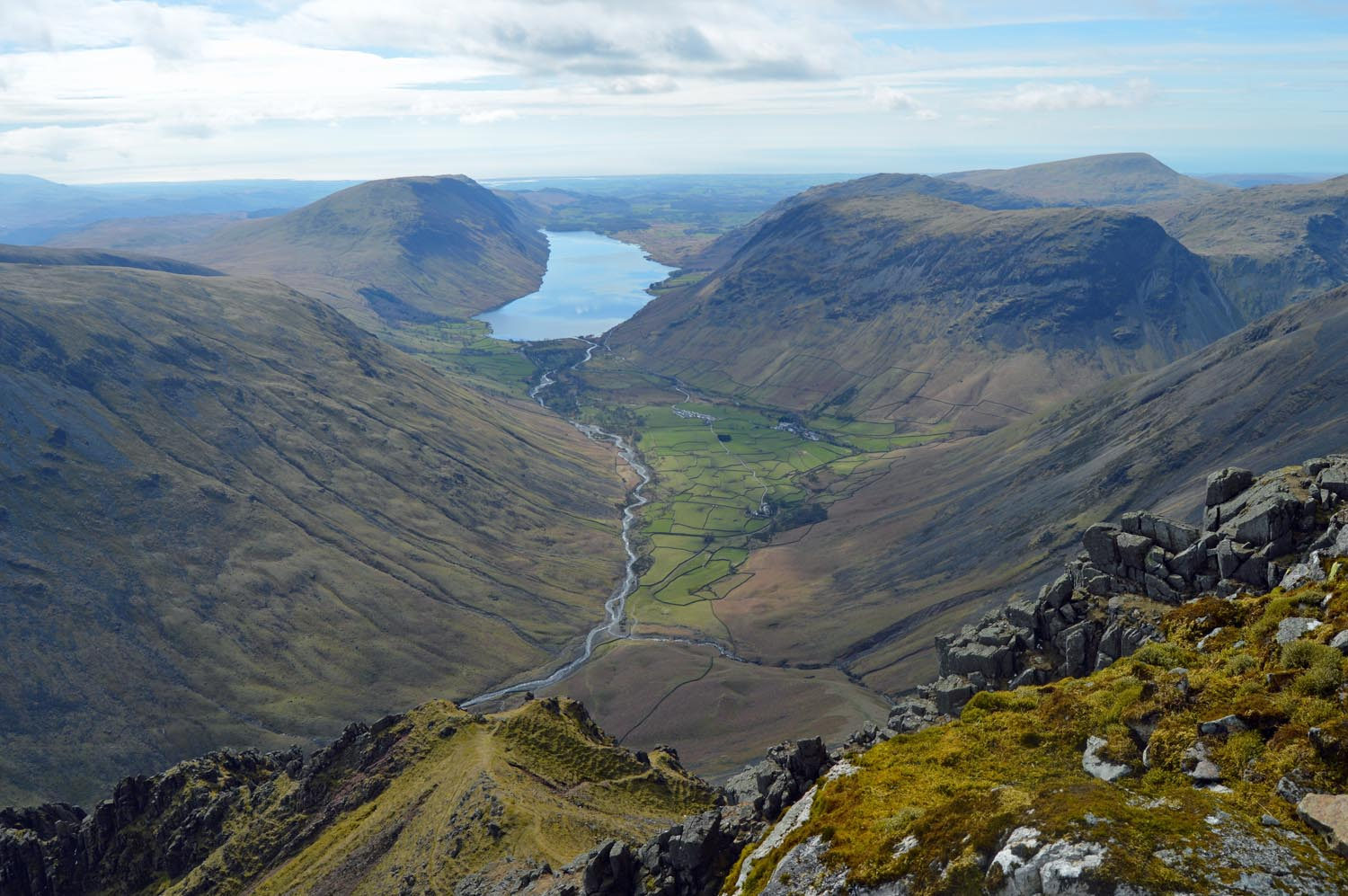
The view from the cairn put up by the Westmorland Brothers to the SW of the summit of Great Gable - "The finest view in the district".

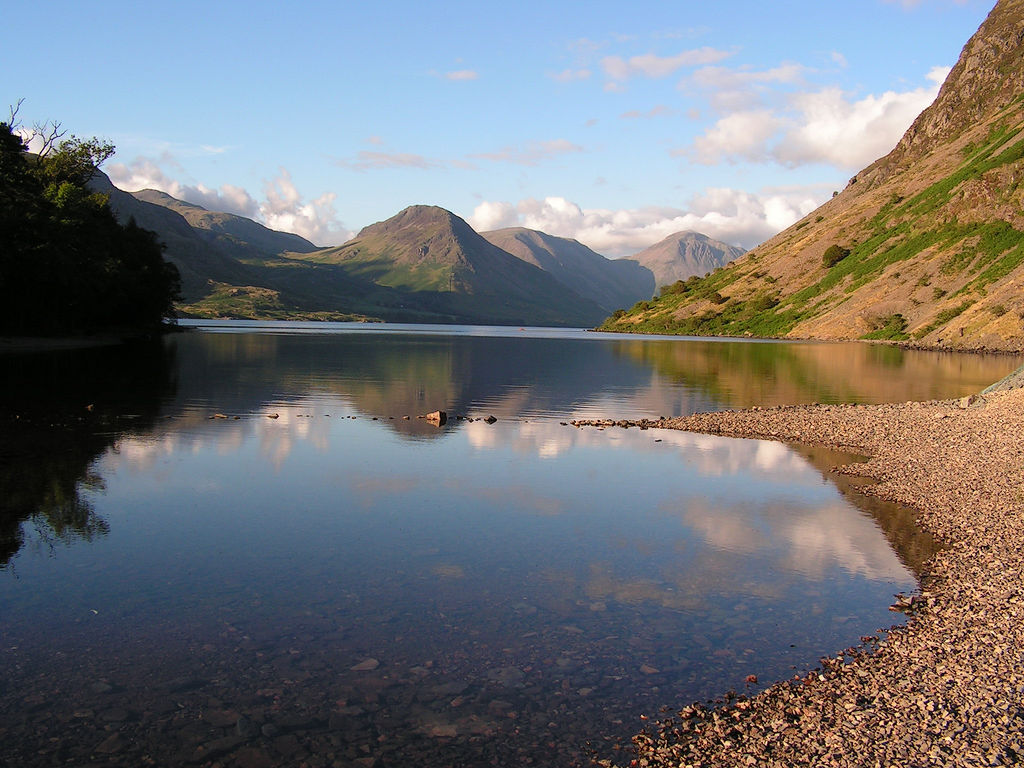
Wastwater in the evening

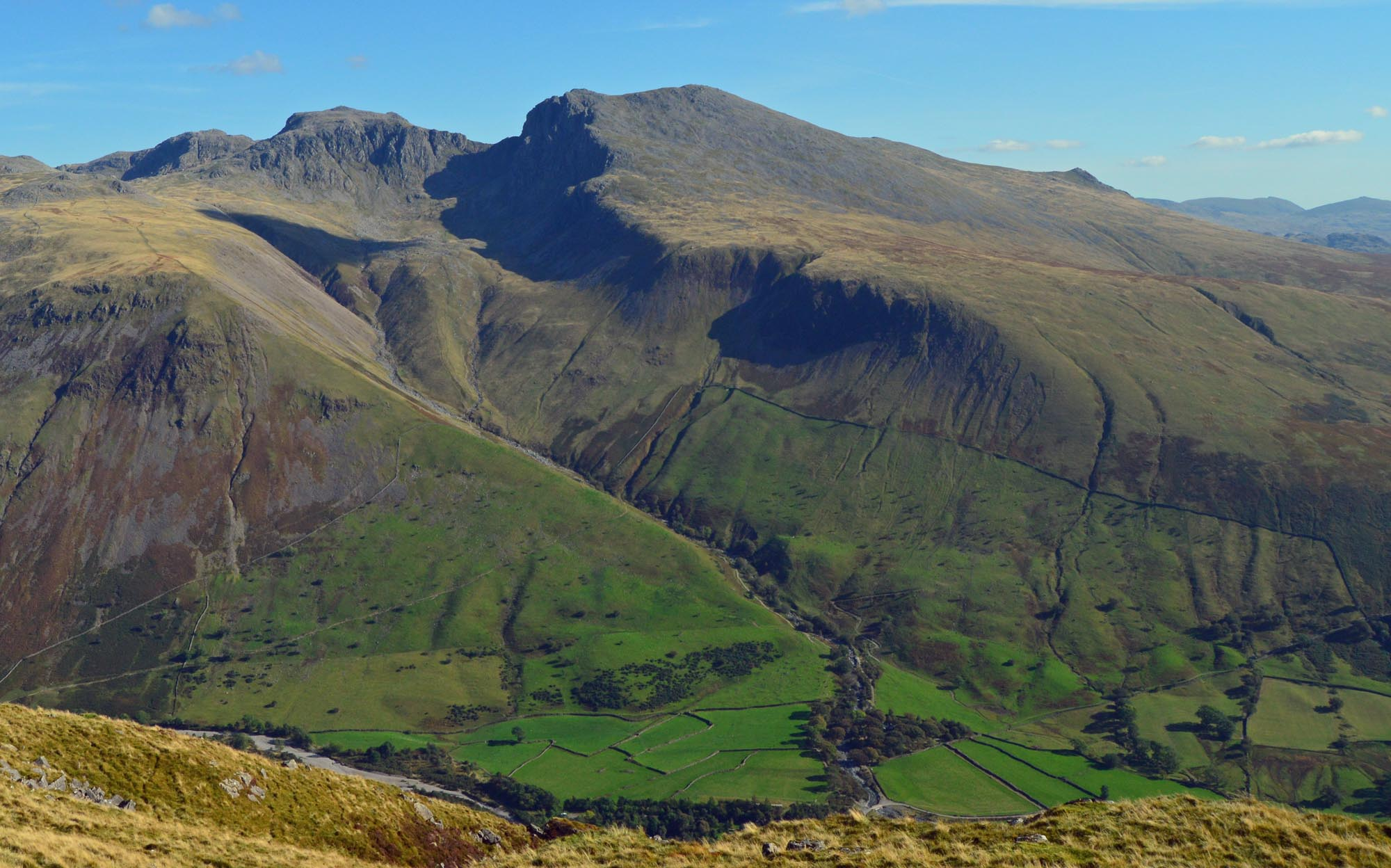
Scafell massif from Middle Fell

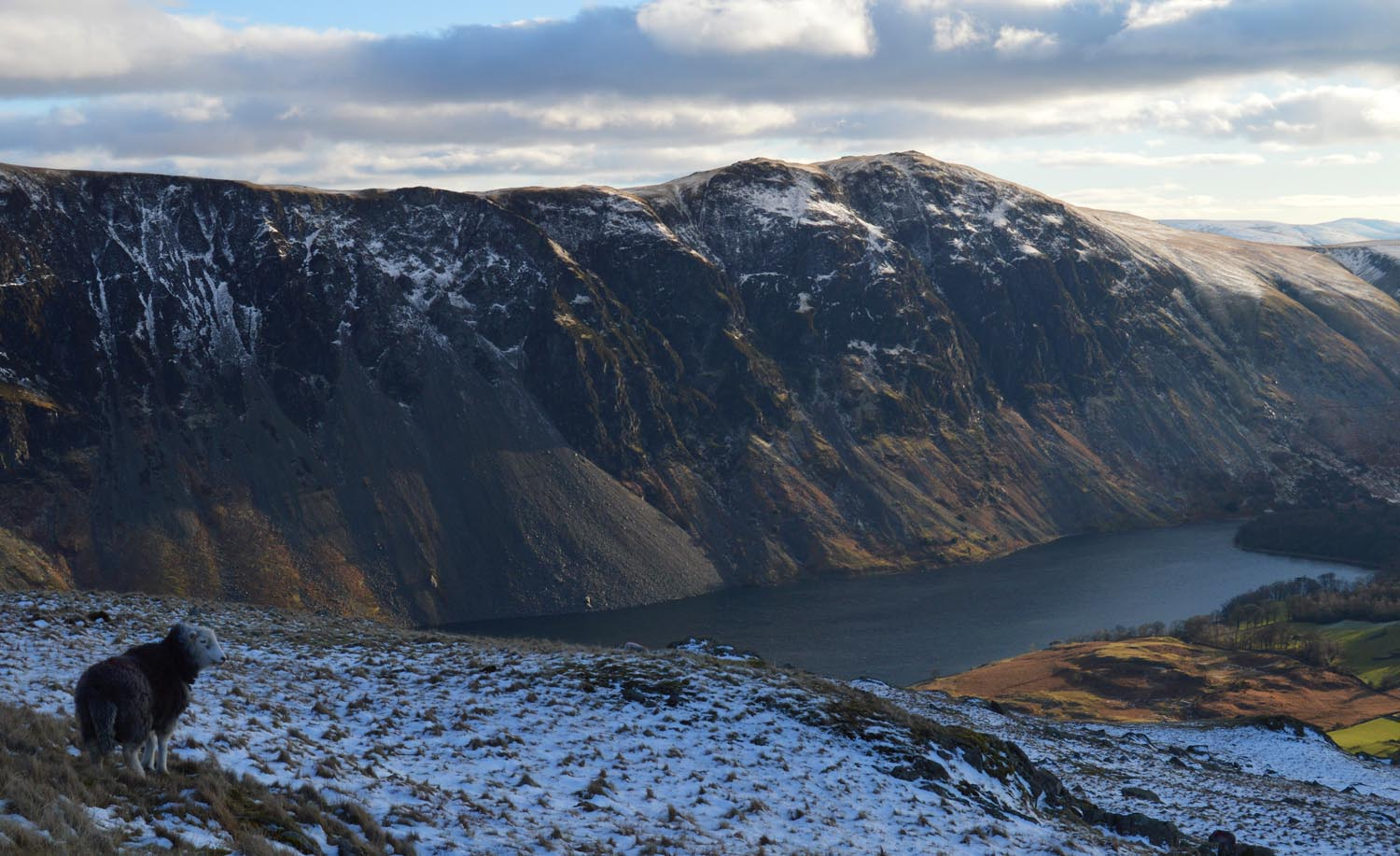
Illgill Head from Middle Fell

View from Wastwater

== See also ==
- Listed buildings in Wasdale
