= Pike o' Blisco =

Mountain in the English Lake District, Cumbria, England

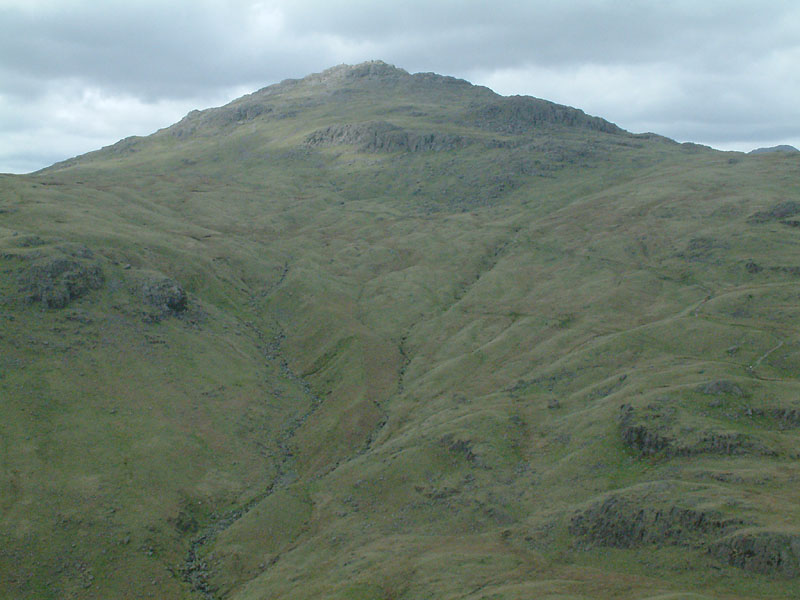
- Pike o' Blisco from the ridge of Wet Side Edge, between the Three Shire Stone and Great Carrs

Highest point
- Elevation: 705 m (2,313 ft)
- Prominence: 177 m (581 ft)
- Parent peak: Scafell Pike
- Listing: Marilyn, Hewitt, Wainwright, Nuttall
- Coordinates: 54°25′41″N 3°07′31″W

Geography
- Location within the Lake District Location within the former Borough of Copeland Location within the former South Lakeland district
- Location: Cumbria, England
- Parent range: Lake District, Southern Fells
- OS grid: NY271042
- Topo map: OS Landrangers 89, 90, Explorer OL6

Pike o' Blisco, or Pike of Blisco, is a mountain in the Lake District in Cumbria, England. Located between the valleys of Great Langdale and Little Langdale, its relative isolation from neighbouring fells together with slopes falling away immediately from the summit in all directions mean it has excellent views: the view of the Langdale Pikes across Great Langdale is particularly arresting.

The name Pike of Blisco is the form used on Ordnance Survey maps. The influential guidebook writer Alfred Wainwright preferred Pike o' Blisco (he refers to Pike of Blisco as its "Sunday name"), and wrote, "the man has no blood in his veins who does not respond eagerly to its fine-sounding, swashbuckling name".

== Topography ==
Pike o' Blisco stands on the complex ridge of high ground descending south-eastward from the Scafell massif. The ridge incorporates Esk Pike, Bow Fell, Crinkle Crags and Cold Pike before turning sharply north-eastward to Pike o' Blisco; it then makes a further abrupt northerly diversion around Blea Tarn to connect to Lingmoor Fell. To the north of Pike o' Blisco is the Oxendale branch of Great Langdale, while Little Langdale stands to the south east. The two valleys drain eastward, joining beyond Lingmoor Fell. To the south of Pike o' Blisco is the 393-metre (1,289-foot) summit of Wrynose Pass, which links Little Langdale with the Duddon Valley, and beyond the pass lies Swirl How and the Coniston Fells.

Between Cold Pike and Pike o' Blisco is a wide grassy depression at 528 metres (1,730 ft). On the southern side is the source of the River Duddon, while to the north is Red Tarn, a feeder of Great Langdale Beck. Red Tarn is an elongated pool whose stony bed can be seen through clear shallow waters, reputed to hold trout. Its name comes from the colour of the surrounding soil rather than the water itself. The tarn forms a focal point for walkers, as the wide path from the summit of Wrynose Pass to Great Langdale runs beside it, with a further path branching off across its outflow towards Crinkle Crags. The main path was originally made to serve Red Crag Mine, which now consists of a series of pits and trial borings for iron ore, concentrated about 300 metres (980 ft) north of the tarn. The mine was worked from 1860 to 1875 but never achieved commercial success.

Pike o' Blisco itself consists of the steep, conical summit area above Red Tarn along with a swathe of hilly country spreading out to the south and east. The summit is defended by Kettle Crag to the north and Black Wars to the west, with Black Crag abreast the ridge descending southward to Wrynose Pass. The eastern part of the fell is centred upon the subsidiary top of Blake Rigg at around 530 metres (1,740 ft) in an area of rocky outcrops and small tarns. From Blake Rigg a ridge runs north east to cross the summit of the Blea Tarn road at 224 metres (735 ft). This pass, narrow and steep even by Lake District standards, links the two Langdales and is named after the large tarn which sits beneath the eastern crags of Blake Rigg. Its waters hold trout, perch and pike, and the easily accessible shoreline features in many a photograph of the Langdale Pikes.

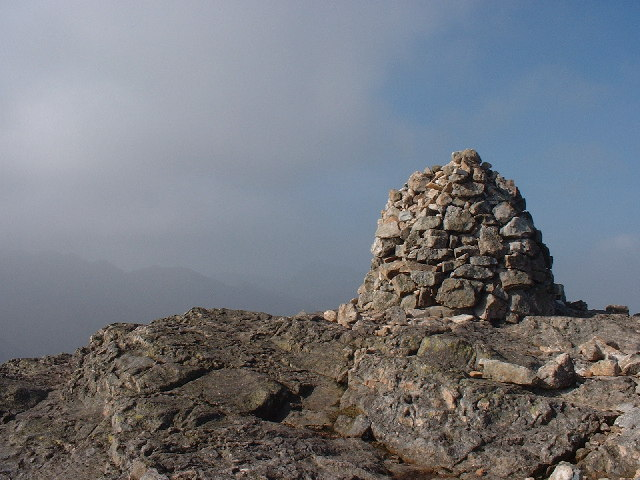
The summit cairn in 2005.

== Geology ==
The interbedded volcaniclastic sandstone, tuff and lapilli tuff of the Blisco Member predominate, with an intrusion of rhyolite running across the eastern slopes.

== Summit ==
Unusually for Lake District fells, Pike o' Blisco's summit is clearly visible from the valley below, in this case Great Langdale. (Consequently, a good view of the valley may be obtained from the summit.) Before 1959 the summit was crowned with a tall, conical cairn which could be seen from the valley, but between 1958 and 1959 it was apparently vandalised. It has subsequently been rebuilt, although it does not appear as tall today as it does in Wainwright's 1958 drawing.

== Ascent routes ==
There are two distinct routes to the summit from the popular walkers' resort of Dungeon Ghyll at the head of Great Langdale. One goes via Stool End farm at the foot of Bowfell; from here it follows the public footpath over the Oxendale Beck and up to Red Tarn, at around 525 metres (1,720 ft) above sea level, before ascending Pike o' Blisco's steep west face. The other route, which takes a generally more even gradient, climbs the mountain's east face using a path that starts from the Little Langdale road.

It is also possible to climb Pike o' Blisco from Little Langdale, via a public footpath from Wrynose Bridge on the road to Wrynose Pass, about 2 km (1 1/4 mi) from the head of the valley. An alternative route from this direction, recommended by Wainwright, involves scrambling up a gully in the crags above the valley head, then walking across pathless terrain to the summit. The easiest route of ascent, however, is from the Three Shire Stone at the head of the Wrynose Pass, where vehicles may be parked at 393 metres (1,290 ft).

Pike o' Blisco is often climbed as a circuit around the head of Great Langdale incorporating Crinkle Crags and Bowfell, sometimes extended to include Rossett Pike and even the Langdale Pikes.
