= Grey Friar =

Fell in the Lake District, Cumbria, England

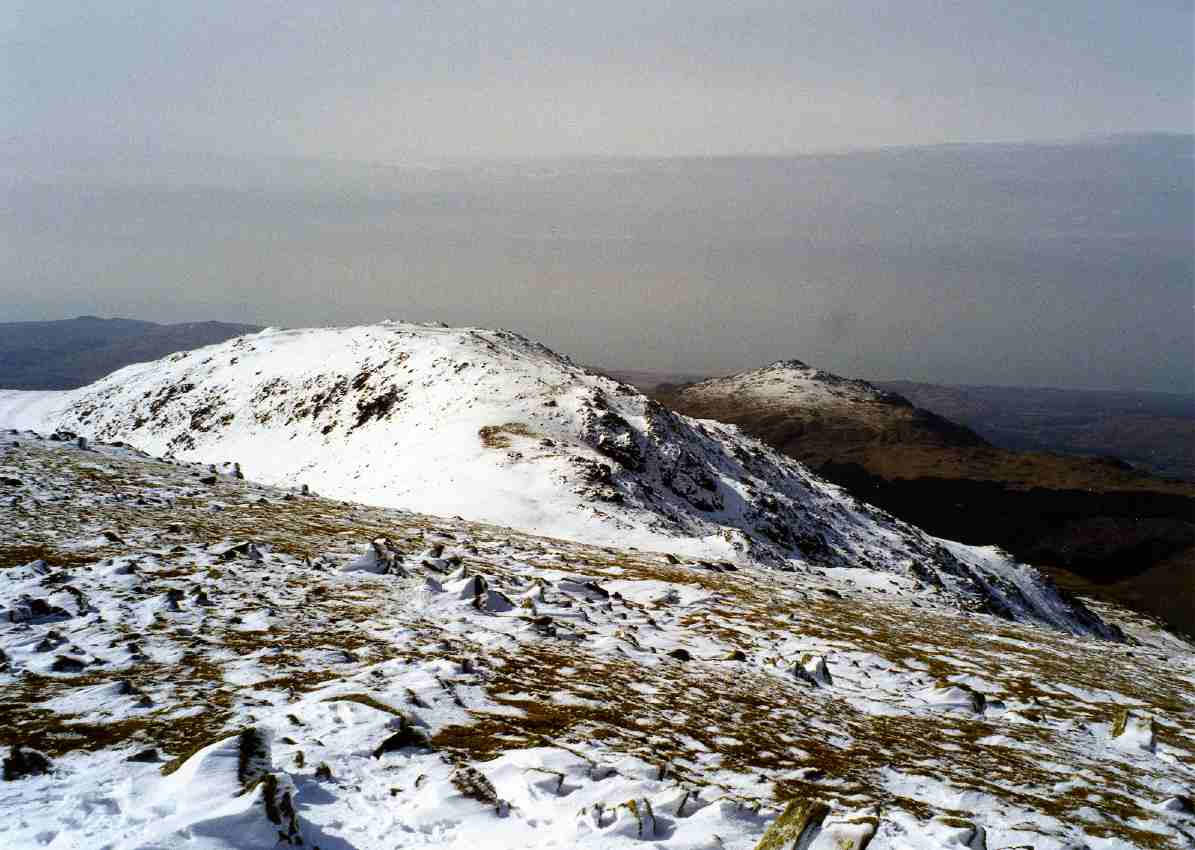
- Grey Friar from Great Carrs, one km to the east, Harter Fell is in the background.

Highest point
- Elevation: 770 m (2,530 ft)
- Prominence: 78 m (256 ft)
- Parent peak: Swirl How
- Listing: Hewitt, Nuttall, Wainwright
- Coordinates: 54°23′34″N 3°08′34″W

Geography
- Location within the Lake District
- Location: Cumbria, England
- Parent range: Lake District, Southern Fells
- OS grid: NY259003
- Topo map: OS Landranger 96, 90 OS Explorer OL6

Grey Friar is a fell in the English Lake District, it is one of the Coniston Fells and is situated 13 kilometres (8 miles) west-south-west of Ambleside. It reaches a height of 770 metres (2,526 feet) and stands to the north west of the other Coniston Fells, a little off the beaten track and tends to be the least visited of the group. It is quite a large fell and forms the eastern wall of the Duddon Valley for several kilometres, in fact all drainage from Grey Friar goes to the Duddon Valley and not to Coniston Water.

== Topography ==
The Coniston (or Furness) Fells form the watershed between Coniston Water and the Duddon valley to the west. The range begins at Wrynose Pass and runs south for around 10 miles (16 km) before petering out at Broughton in Furness on the Duddon Estuary. Grey Friar is the only major fell in the group not to stand on this main axis, rising to the west of Great Carrs across the depression of Fairfield.

Bounded to the north and west by the infant Duddon, Grey Friar has long rough slopes on this side with many small areas of crag. The southern perimeter is formed by Seathwaite Tarn and its attendant streams. The tarn was originally a much smaller waterbody, but was raised early in the 20th century to provide drinking water for the Barrow in Furness area. The dam is almost 400 yards (370 m) long and is concrete cored with slate buttresses, the resulting depth of the tarn being around 80 feet (25 m). Water is not abstracted directly from the tarn, but flows some distance downriver to an off-take weir. Since Grey Friar curves southward, the main ridge stands across the tarn, Brim Fell and the back of Dow Crag forming the opposing slope.

== Mining ==
The fell has been mined for copper extensively in the past. The Seathwaite mine was situated on the southern slopes above Seathwaite Tarn while the Cockley Beck mine stood on the fell's lower north western slopes. They operated in the mid-19th century and were nowhere near as profitable or extensive as the main Coniston copper mines in the so-called “Coppermines Valley”.

== Ascents ==
Grey Friar can be climbed from several locations; it is often ascended along with the other six Coniston fells and this walk is usually started at Coniston village. Direct ascents of the fell can be started from the Duddon valley, the top of the Wrynose Pass or Cockley Beck.

== Summit ==
The summit of the fell is stony with two cairned rock outcrops, the south easterly is the higher while the north westerly offers the better view. There is a good view of the Scafell massif and the other Coniston fells are well seen along the ridge to the south. 200 metres (660 ft) north west of the main summit is a distinctive pointed rock, often called the “Matterhorn Rock”.
