= Wetherlam =

Mountain in the English Lake District, Cumbria, England

Coordinates: 54°24′04″N 3°05′53″W

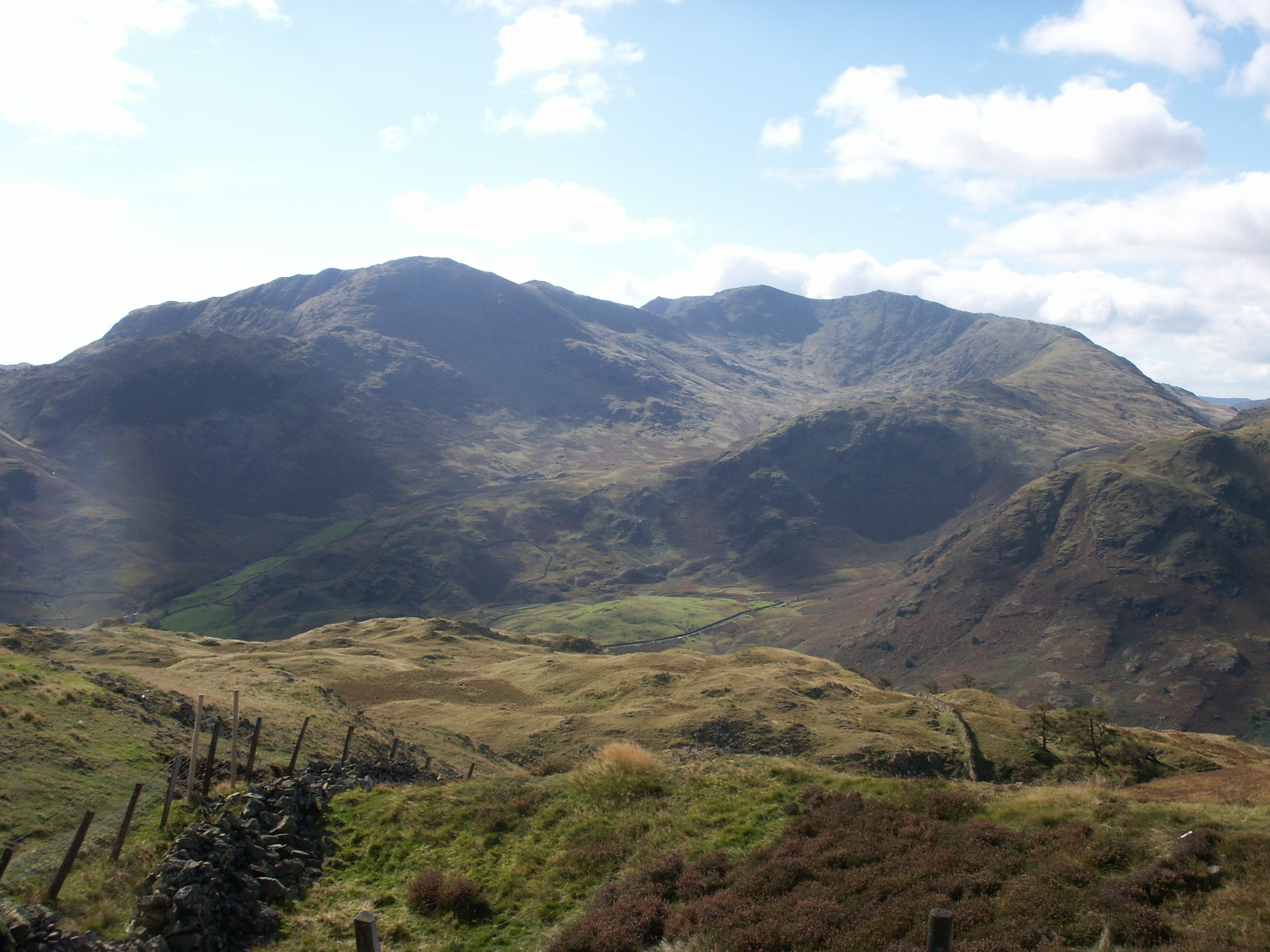
- Wetherlam on the left, seen from Lingmoor Fell

Highest point
- Elevation: 763 m (2,503 ft)
- Prominence: c. 145 m (475 ft)
- Parent peak: Coniston Old Man
- Listing: Wainwright, Hewitt, Nuttall

Geography
- Location: Cumbria, England
- Parent range: Lake District, Southern Fells
- OS grid: NY288011
- Topo map: OS Landranger 89, 90, Explorer OL6

Listed summits of Wetherlam
Name	Grid ref	Height	Status
Black Sails	NY282007	745 m (2,444 ft)	Hewitt, Nuttall

Wetherlam (763 m) is a mountain in the English Lake District. It is the most northerly of the Coniston Fells, the range of fells to the north-west of Coniston village; its north-east slopes descend to Little Langdale.

== Topography ==
Wetherlam stands apart from the main north–south spine of the Coniston Fells, the connection being via the long east ridge of Swirl How. Midway along this ridge is Black Sails, an intermediate top usually considered to be part of Wetherlam, and listed as a Hewitt in its own right.

From Swirl How the east ridge drops steeply down Prison Band to Swirl Hawse, before rising again to the summit of Black Sails. Black Sails has a descending southern spur which steps down over High and Low Wether Crags. Between this and the main Coniston range is the valley of Swirl Hawse Beck and Levers Water. This tarn has been raised by damming to a depth of 125 feet (40 m), originally to supply water to the Coniston Copper Mines. Following the decline of mining a water treatment plant was built, and since the 1970s the tarn has supplied drinking water for Coniston and other local villages as far east as Sawrey.

The main ridge continues east from Black Sails across the depression of Red Dell Head to the summit of Wetherlam. A second southward spur, paralleling that from Black Sails, descends from the main summit. This is Lad Stones ridge and the valley contained between the two is Red Dell.

Wetherlam has a further ridge which descends steeply north eastward along Wetherlam Edge. This leads via Birk Fell to an attractive upland plateau between Tilberthwaite and Little Langdale. Many rocky knolls characterise the area, the most prominent being Blake Rigg and Great Intake. To the south east of Wetherlam is a further upland area, named Yewdale Fells on Ordnance Survey maps. This displays less bare rock, but is fringed by a wall of crag above the Coniston - Ambleside road.

To the north of Wetherlam is the Greenburn Valley, a feeder of Little Langdale. A steep sided, rather marshy valley, Greenburn's waters join the River Brathay at Little Langdale Tarn. Greenburn itself bears a tarn, or more correctly the remains of a reservoir. A natural waterbody was dammed in the early 18th century to provide water for the Greenburn Mine. The 250-yard-long (230 m) barrage has now been breached to leave a collection of pools and bogs. Greenburn is bounded to the north by the curve of Wet Side Edge, falling from Great Carrs.

== Summit ==
The summit is a gentle dome with a cairn marking the highest point. The vista is wide with the majority of the Southern, Central and Eastern Fells in view. Little Langdale is perhaps the finest aspect.

== Mining ==
In the past Wetherlam was extensively exploited for its mineral resources. The slopes on all sides are pitted with disused copper mines and slate quarries, making it the most industrialised of the Lake District fells. The workings are on a small scale, however, and, according to Alfred Wainwright, unobtrusive: "this fine hill... is too vast and sturdy to be disfigured and weakened by man's feeble scratchings of its surface".

The principal copper mining areas were to the south of Wetherlam, in what is now Coppermines Valley. Much of the activity took place on the slopes of Brim Fell to the south, but Red Dell and the ridges on either side hold many shafts, and there are workings below the bed of Levers Water. These mines were at their most productive in the 1850s, closing in 1915. Some prospecting was carried out in 1954, but the degree of collapse was too severe for reopening. Copper Pyrite was the main product, but iron, lead, nickel and cobalt were also won.

To the east of the fell was Tilberthwaite Mine, with many shafts around the gill and up the slopes of Birk Fell. This was also worked for copper, operations ceasing in 1942.

The mines in Greenburn served by the reservoir there were also known as New Coniston Mine. Copper was won from 1845 until the mine was substantially abandoned in 1865, the shafts reaching a depth of 700 feet (210 m) below ground.

There are major slate quarries at Tilberthwaite and further workings on the Yewdale Fells and Lad Stones ridge.

== Ascents ==
There are three natural starting points for an ascent of Wetherlam: the village of Coniston to the south, and the valleys of Tilberthwaite to the east and Little Langdale to the north-east.

From Coniston a path and an unsurfaced road lead into the Coppermines Valley, the site of a number of disused mines; this is also the start of a popular path up the Old Man of Coniston. There are two possible routes to Wetherlam's summit from the Coppermines: either up the south ridge, called Lad Stones, or up the Red Dell valley to the west of the ridge.

Walkers approaching from Little Langdale or Tilberthwaite can take any of a number of paths to Birk Fell Hawse, a small col to the north-east of the summit at the foot of the ridge of Wetherlam Edge. It is then a steep ascent (around 200 metres in half a kilometre – 40%) up the latter ridge to reach the summit.

Wetherlam is often climbed as part of the "Coniston Round", a circuit of the skyline of the Coppermines Valley that takes in Swirl How, Brim Fell, the Old Man of Coniston and optionally Dow Crag.
