= Furness Fells =

Hills and mountains in the Furness region of Cumbria, England

Coordinates: 54.223°N 3.116°W

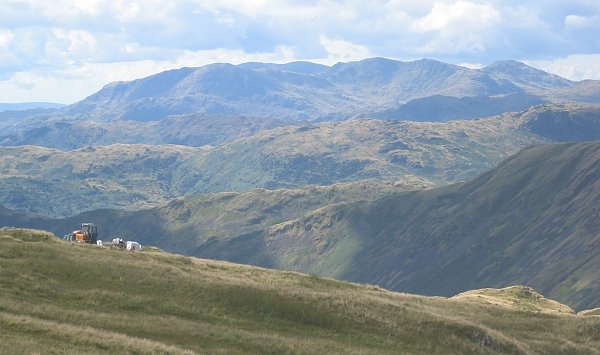
The Coniston Fells as a single unit - seen from Helvellyn.

The Furness Fells (archaic: Fournisfels) are a multitude of hills and mountains in the Furness region of Cumbria, England. Historically part of Lancashire, the Furness Fells or High Furness is the name given to the upland part of Furness, that is, that part of Furness lying north of the line between Ulverston and Ireleth. The hills lie largely within the English Lake District.

The term Furness Fells is also sometimes used as a synonym with Coniston Fells, perhaps partly as a result of the placing of the words "Furness Fells" on some Ordnance Survey 1:250 000 maps. The Coniston Fells properly form only part of the Furness Fells, albeit with all the highest mountains; other fells in Furness are of lower altitude. The Coniston Fells form part of the Southern Fells of the Lake District as defined by Alfred Wainwright.

== Coniston Fells ==
The Coniston Fells are separated from the Scafell and Bowfell massif to their north by Wrynose Pass, and are surrounded on all other sides by lower ground. Coniston Old Man, the highest summit in the group, is the farthest south 2000-foot summit in the Lake District (using a 30-metre relative height criterion to determine what a summit is).

The tops of the Coniston Fells may be climbed from many points, including the village of Coniston at their base, or from Seathwaite in the Duddon Valley, or from Wrynose Pass. Seathwaite Tarn above the Duddon is the third-largest tarn in the Lake District; Levers Water, Low Water, Goat's Water and Blind Tarn are also located in the Coniston Fells group.

=== Coniston Fells Summits ===
- Coniston Old Man, 803m
- Swirl How, 802m
- Dow Crag, 778m
- Grey Friar, 773m
- Wetherlam, 763m
- Black Sails, 745m
- Great Intake, 489m.

These summits all have more than 30 metres of relative height (a commonly used criterion for being a separate summit). Alfred Wainwright included three more tops: Great Carrs, Brim Fell and Walna Scar, and included mention of White Maiden and White Pike. South of White Pike there is a significant loss of altitude before the Dunnerdale Fells, which therefore while forming part of the Furness Fells may be said to be distinct from the Coniston Fells.
