= Old Man of Coniston =

Mountain in the English Lake District, Cumbria, England

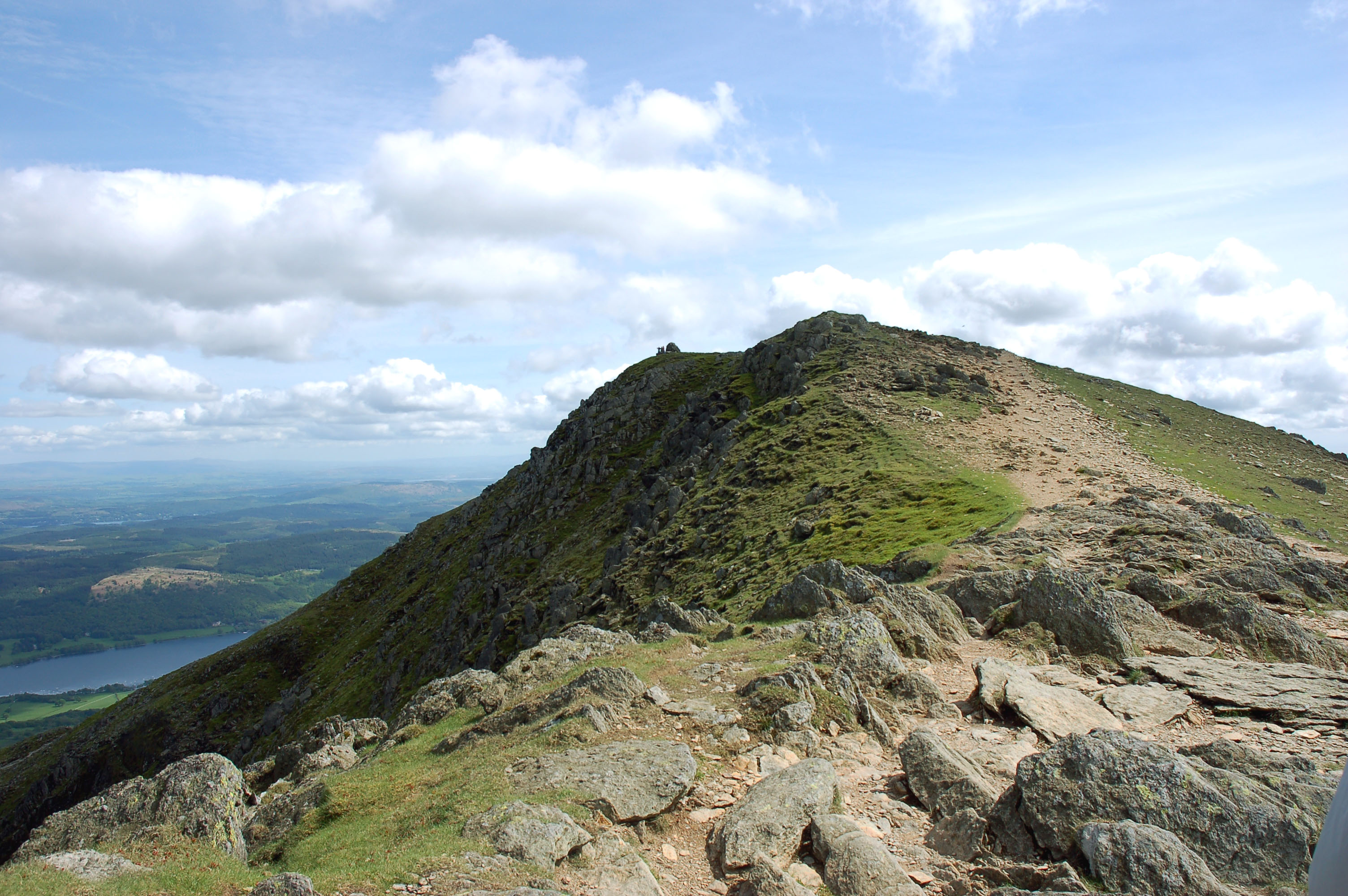

Highest point
- Elevation: 802.42 m (2,632.6 ft)
- Prominence: 416 m (1,365 ft)
- Isolation: 7.1 km (4.4 mi)
- Listing: Hewitt, Marilyn, Nuttall, Wainwright
- Coordinates: 54°22′12″N 3°07′08″W

Geography
- Location within the Lake District
- Location: Cumbria, England (traditionally Lancashire)
- Parent range: Lake District, Southern Fells
- OS grid: SD272978
- Topo map: OS Landranger 90, Explorer OL6

The Old Man of Coniston is a fell in the Furness Fells of the Lake District in Cumbria, England, and is the highest point (county top) of the historic county of Lancashire. It is at least 2,632.62 feet (802.42 m) high, and lies to the west of the village of Coniston and the lake, Coniston Water. The fell is sometimes known by the alternative name of Coniston Old Man, or simply The Old Man. The mountain is popular with tourists and fell-walkers with a number of well-marked paths to the summit. The mountain has also seen extensive copper and slate mining activity for eight hundred years, and the remains of abandoned mines and spoil tips are a significant feature of the north-east slopes.

== Geology ==
The Old Man of Coniston is within the outcrop of the Ordovician Borrowdale Volcanic Group. A band of the dacitic lapilli-tuffs of the Lag Bank Formation crosses the summit. The southern slopes show the volcaniclastic sandstones of the Seathwaite Fell Formation, while the rhyolitic tuffs of the Paddy End Member stretch from north of the summit toward the Coppermines.

== Geography ==
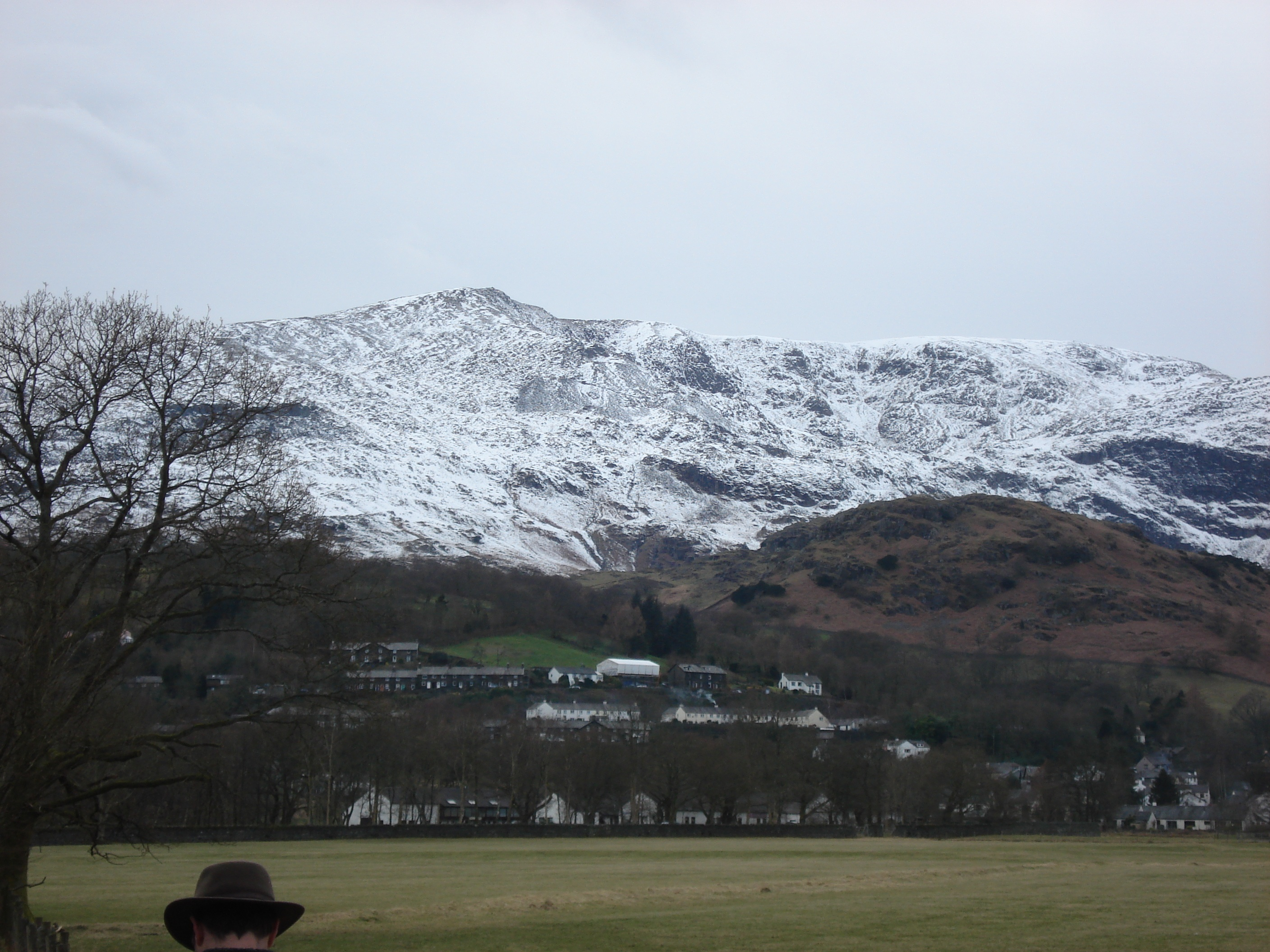
Old Man of Coniston from Coniston Water lakeside

The Coniston (or Furness) Fells form the watershed between Coniston Water in the east and the Duddon valley to the west. The range begins in the north at Wrynose Pass and runs south for around 10 miles (16 km) before petering out at Broughton in Furness on the Duddon Estuary. Alfred Wainwright in his influential Pictorial Guide to the Lakeland Fells took only the northern half of the range as Lakeland proper, consigning the lower hills southward to a supplementary work The Outlying Fells of Lakeland. Later guidebook writers have chosen to include the whole range in their main volumes.

The central part of the Coniston range can be likened to an inverted 'Y', with Brim Fell at the connecting point of the three arms. The main spine of the ridge runs north over Swirl How and Great Carrs, and south-west to Dow Crag and the lower hills beyond. The third arm is a truncated spur, running only half a mile to the summit of the Old Man before tumbling away south-eastward to the valley floor. This ridge-end position gives the fell a sense of isolation and increased stature, with steep faces on three sides.

To the west is the deep trench containing Goat's Water. This elongated tarn has a depth of about 50 ft (15 m) and contains trout and char. Enclosed by high ground, it has an outlet to the south through a field of boulders. This is one of the headwaters of Torver Beck, which passes a disused quarry near the Tranearth climbing hut, keeping the workings topped up via an artificial but picturesque waterfall. The stream finally issues into Coniston Water south of Torver village.

The southern and eastern flanks of the Old Man are composed of rough ground, deeply pockmarked by slate quarries. One of these quarries, Bursting Stone, is still operating and produces an olive-green slate. Across the southern slopes runs the Walna Scar Road. This was the original trade route between Coniston village and the settlements of the Duddon Valley, and is a public restricted byway.

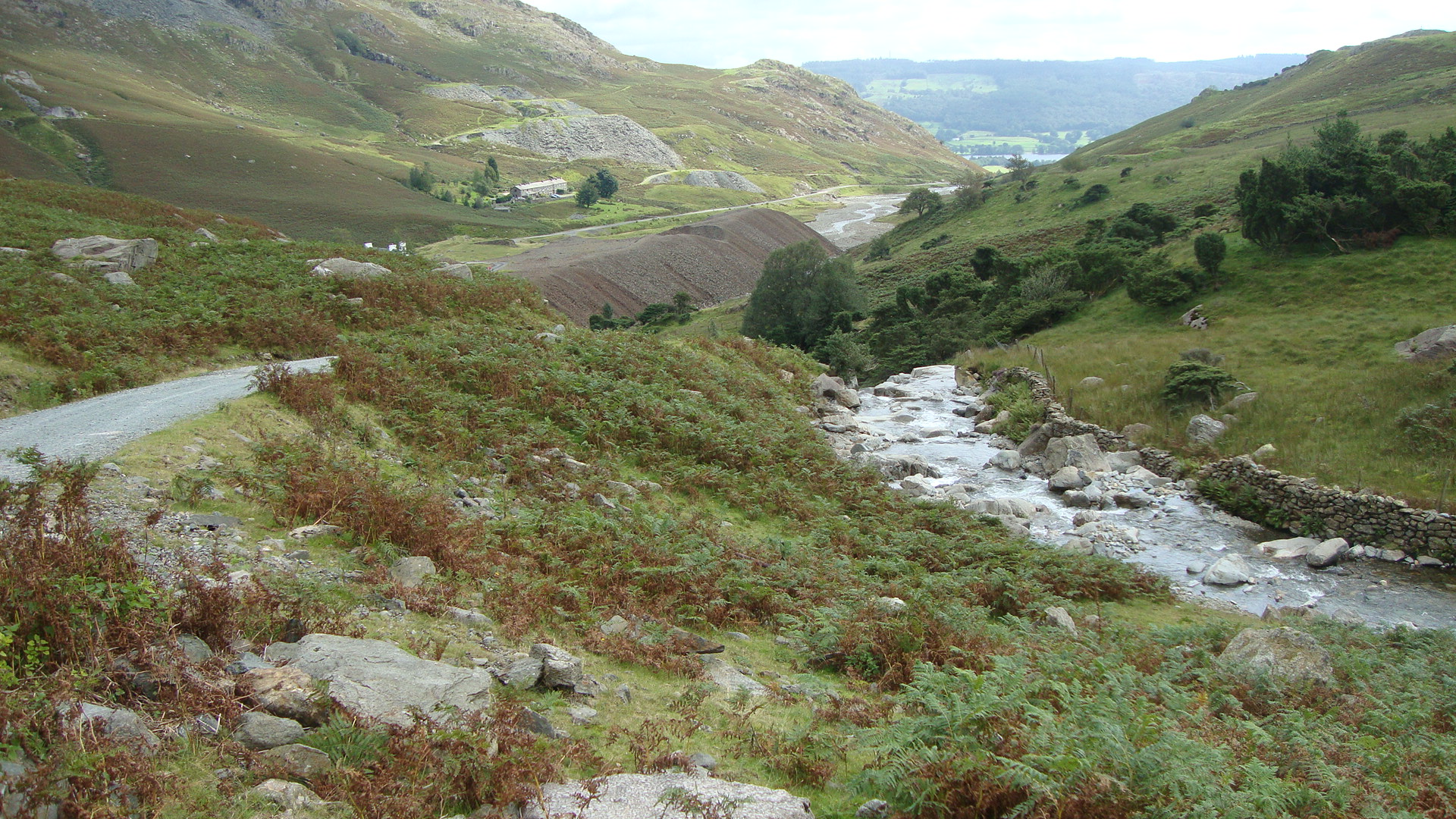
Start of walk up the hill

The first section rising steeply from Coniston is a metalled road, maintained partly to provide access to the quarry. This leads to a car park at an altitude of 740 ft (230 m), a popular starting point for climbs. Beyond here motor vehicles are prohibited, but the track continues to its summit at 2,000 ft (610 m), crossing the ridge to the south of Dow Crag.

Coniston Old Man has no connecting ridges other than that to Brim Fell, but a discernible rib falls due east via Stubthwaite Crag and Crowberry Haws. Below the tourist route path, this rib climbs again to The Bell, a fine rocky top (1,099 ft (335 m)) with excellent views of the lake and village.

Nestling beneath the northern face of the Old Man, and cradled between it and Raven's Tor, is Low Water. This corrie tarn has been dammed in the past to provide water for the quarries, but all of its water now issues via a cascade of falls into the Coppermines Valley. This area, shared with the neighbouring fells of Brim Fell and Wetherlam, is heavily scarred by historic copper, nickel and cobalt mining, particularly in the latter half of the 19th century.

== Topography ==
A 2018 survey measured the height of the highest visible natural ground to be 802.42 m (2,632.6 ft). The height of the ground on the summit plinth (man-made ground) is 803.53 m (2,636.3 ft). The same survey also measured the height of nearby Swirl How, and measured it to be also 802.42 m (2,632.6 ft). The measurements were reported with a measurement uncertainty of plus or minus 0.05 metres (2 inches)

The surveyors state: "If one considers the area covered by the plinth on Coniston Old Man and the observation that the highest rock is probably covered by it then we believe the evidence strongly suggests there is higher ground beneath it and that, therefore, Coniston Old Man should retain its current status" [as being the highest of the Furness Fells and the county top of historic Lancashire].

As of 2020, Ordnance Survey maps show the Old Man of Coniston with a height of 803 m (2,635 ft), and Swirl How at 802 m (2,631 ft), which makes the Old Man the highest point in the Furness Fells, and the 12th most prominent mountain in England.

== Ascents ==
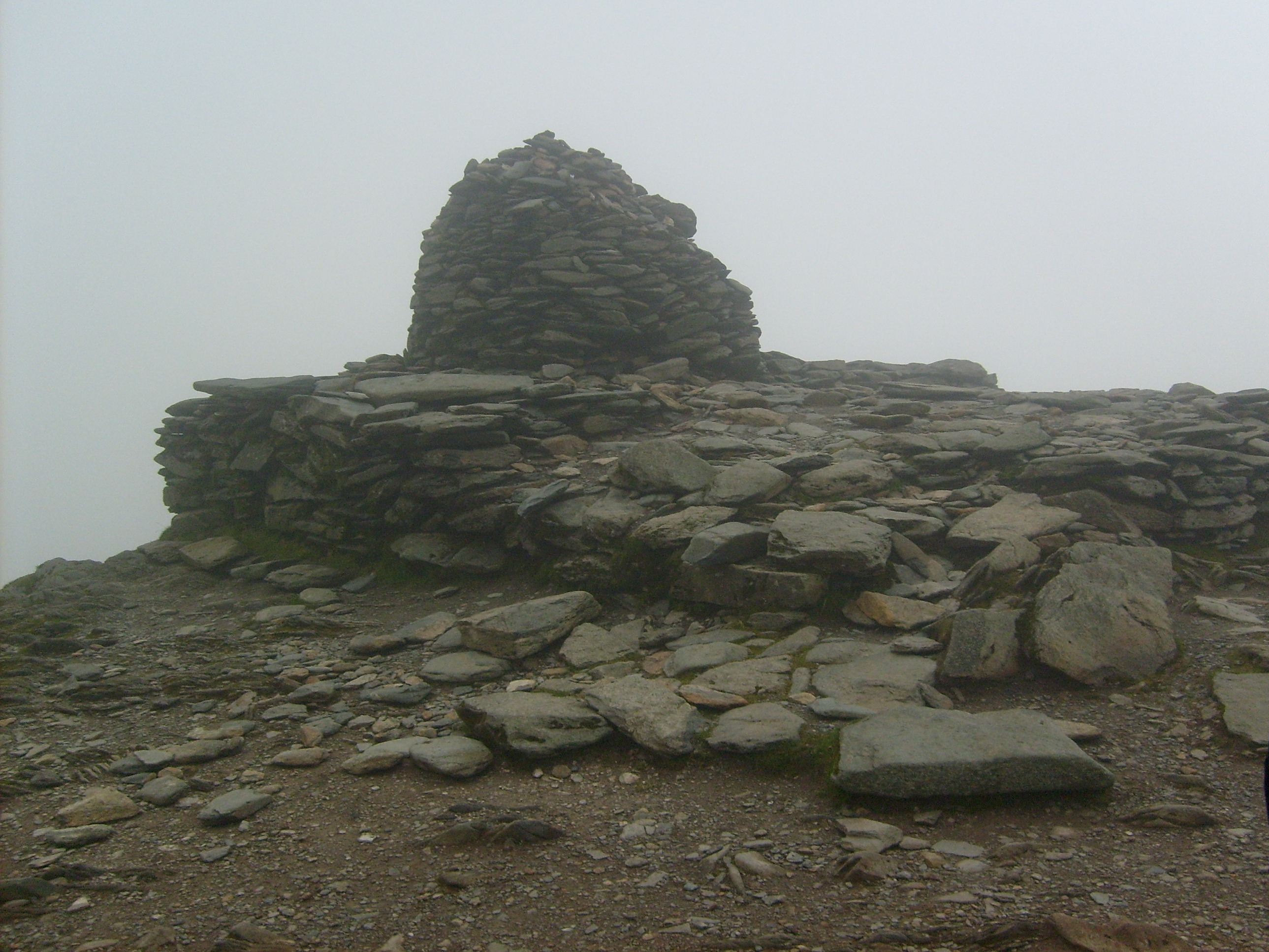
Summit of the Old Man of Coniston

The fell is normally climbed from Coniston via Church Beck and the mines. Alternatives include the south ridge and the path to Goat's Water, both ascending from the Walna Scar Road. The car park at the top of the metalled section provides a headstart for these routes. The Walna Scar Road can also be reached from Torver, or from Seathwaite in the Duddon Valley, although the latter results in an indirect climb via Dow Crag.

The summit of the fell carries a construction, a combined slate platform and cairn. The view from the summit on a clear day includes much of the southern Lake District, Morecambe Bay, Blackpool Tower, Winter Hill in the Pennines, the Lancashire coast and the Isle of Man. Perhaps the highlight is the close-up view of Dow Crag.

== Mining ==
Coniston copper mines are reputed to be some of the largest copper mines in Britain, with a vertical distance of around 2,000 ft (610 m). On the Coniston Old Man itself, slate replaced copper, and over several hundred years, the Old Man slate quarries and mines became some of the largest in England.

The Old Man slate quarries were believed to have started in the 12th and 13th centuries, although there is little evidence on site of this. By the 1500s the quarries, working a kind of volcanic slate silver-grey in colour, were well established. The earliest major working shortly after this period was probably at Low Water Quarry, where opencast slate was prised from cuttings near the summit; Scald Kop Quarry, where a large cavern was formed from slate extraction on the surface; and the Saddlestone Quarry, again consisting of two 'caves' where slate had been quarried to form underground workings.

== Cultural influences ==
The Old Man of Coniston is the inspiration for the so-called Kanchenjunga, the Lake District mountain Arthur Ransome's Swallows and Amazons climb in the Swallows and Amazons novel Swallowdale. The slate quarries and copper mines inspired Pigeon Post, a later novel in the same series. The Old Man of Coniston is also a principal location in the 2020 fantasy young adult novel The Left-Handed Booksellers of London by Garth Nix.

The Aetherius Society considers it to be one of its 19 holy mountains.
