= Dow Crag =

Fell in the Lake District, Cumbria, England

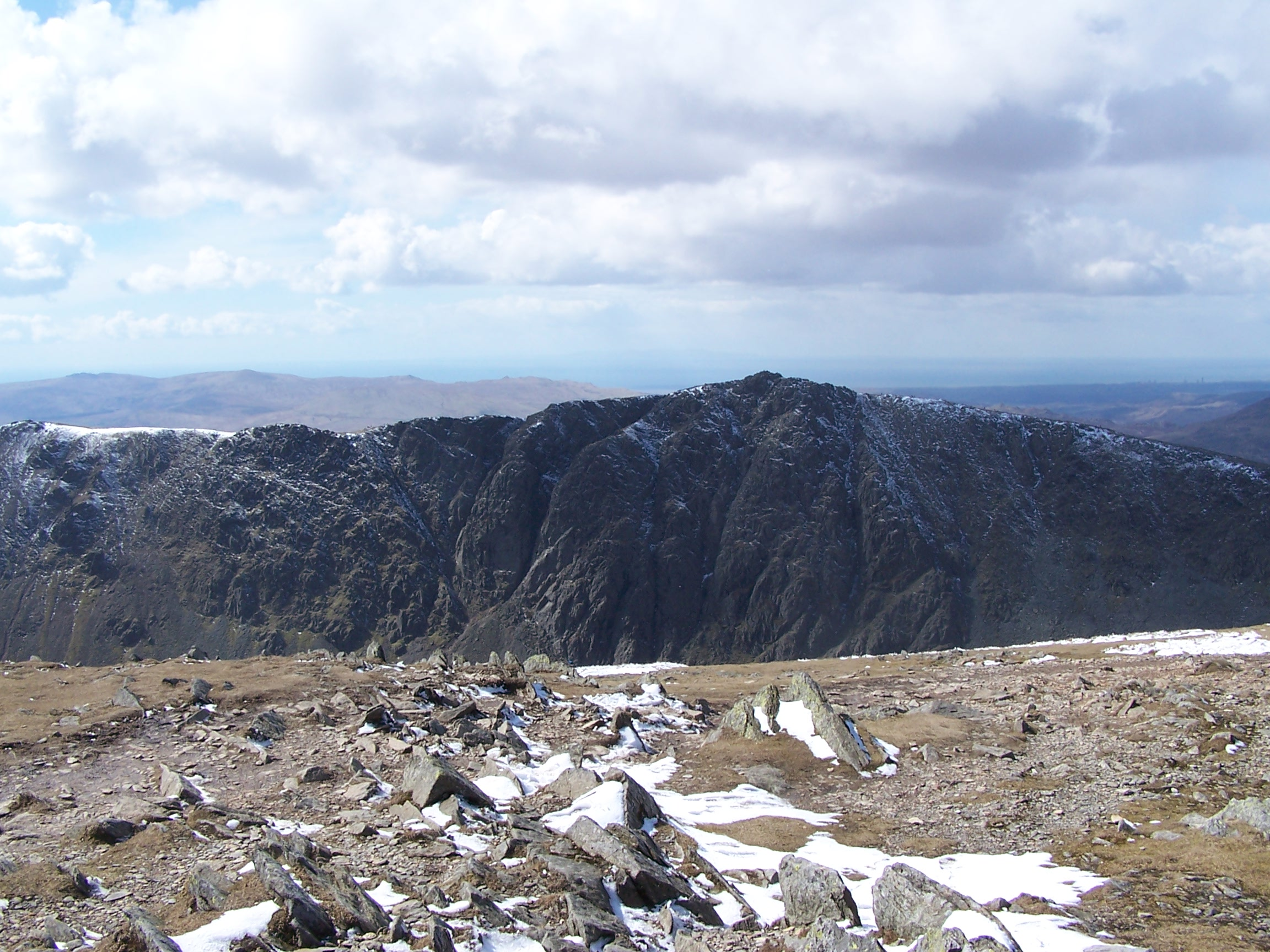
- Dow Crag from the Old Man of Coniston summit

Highest point
- Elevation: 778 m (2,552 ft)
- Prominence: 129 m (423 ft)
- Parent peak: The Old Man of Coniston
- Listing: Hewitt, Nuttall, Wainwright
- Coordinates: 54°22′10″N 3°08′15″W

Geography
- Location within the Lake District
- Location: Cumbria, England
- Parent range: Lake District, Southern Fells
- OS grid: SD262977
- Topo map: OS Landrangers 96, 97, Explorer OL6

Dow Crag is a fell in the English Lake District near Coniston, Cumbria. The eastern face is one of the many rock faces in the Lake District used for rock climbing.

The name Dow Crag originally applied specifically to the eastern face which looks down upon the tarn of Goat's Water, the fell itself having no need for a name before the inception of hill walking in the 19th century. As with many fells the name of a prominent feature was then applied to the whole mass. Dow was originally named Doe and still locally pronounced as "Doe".

== Topography ==
The Coniston (or Furness) Fells form the watershed between Coniston Water and the Duddon Valley to the west. The range begins in the north at Wrynose Pass and runs south for around 10 miles (16 km) before petering out at Broughton in Furness on the Duddon Estuary. Alfred Wainwright in his influential Pictorial Guide to the Lakeland Fells took only the northern half of the range as Lakeland proper, consigning the lower fells southward to a supplementary work The Outlying Fells of Lakeland. Dow Crag is the last fell in the northern section of the range and therefore qualifies as one of the 214 Wainwrights. Later guidebook writers have chosen to include the whole range in their main volumes.

The higher northern part of the range can be likened to an inverted 'Y' in plan. Brim Fell stands at the junction of the three arms with the northern branch continuing over Swirl How and Great Carrs. The south western branch traverses to Dow Crag and the south eastern to The Old Man of Coniston, with Goat's Water lying in a deep depression between the two. The connecting ridge from Dow Crag to Brim Fell crosses the depression of Goat's Hawse above the head of the tarn, the Dow Crag side in particular being steep and rough.

South of Dow Crag the ridge steps down over the subsidiary tops of Buck Pike (2,440 ft (740 m)) and Brown Pike (2,237 ft (682 m)) to the Walna Scar Road. This is primarily a pedestrian route - the summit being at 1,985 ft (605 m) - although it has seen use from off-road vehicles, together with the attendant erosion. It provides a crossing from Coniston village to Seathwaite in the Duddon valley and was originally constructed both to facilitate local trade and to serve the many slate quarries on these fells. The first section at either end is paved although the remainder is a stony bridleway.

Beyond the Walna Scar Road are the further tops of Walna Scar (2,040 ft (620 m)), White Maiden (1,995 ft (608 m)) and White Pike (1,960 ft (600 m)). Richards treats these as one fell (Walna Scar) in his recent Landranger guide. South of White Pike is a profound drop to an area of rough country before the shapely pyramid of Caw rises skyward.

To the west long and gentle slopes run down from the summit of Dow Crag toward the Duddon, while further north on this flank is Seathwaite Tarn. The ground here also begins in a shallow descent, but turns steep above the tarn in a line of minor crags. Seathwaite Tarn is a reservoir in a side valley of the Duddon system. This was originally a much smaller waterbody, but was dammed early in the 20th century to provide drinking water for the Barrow in Furness area. The dam is almost 400 yd (370 m) long and is concrete cored with slate buttresses, the resulting depth being around 80 ft (24 m). Water is not abstracted directly from the tarn, but flows some distance downriver to an off-take weir.

By contrast Goat's Water retains its natural form. Much smaller and enclosed by steep ground on three sides it contains both trout and char. The outlet flows through a boulder field, becoming one of the headwaters of Torver Beck. This stream passes a disused quarry near the Tranearth climbing hut, keeping the workings topped up via an artificial but extremely picturesque waterfall. Torver Beck finally issues into Coniston Water to the south of Torver village.

A second tarn to the east of Dow Crag stands in a small hollow below Brown Pike. This is Blind Tarn, so named because it has no visible inlet or outlet. About a hundred yards across and twenty feet deep, the tarn has a respectable population of trout. Whilst other theories are possible, it must be assumed they have been introduced for sport.

== Summit ==
The summit bears no cairn, being a rocky point perched directly above the crag. The view south and west to the coast is excellent, but much of Lakeland is blotted out by the flanks of the Coniston range. The Scafells are far enough west to put in an appearance and Skiddaw and the Helvellyn range can be seen through Fairfield and Levers Hawse.

== Ascents ==
The simplest direct routes begin at either end of the Walna Scar Road, making for the summit from the top of the pass. Ascents can be made from Seathwaite Tarn (pathless) or to the north of Goat's Hawse, but these give no clue to the grandeur of the crag on the eastern side of the ridge. For this the walker will leave the Walna Scar Road at The Cove, or climb to this point from Torver. From here Goat's Water is the next objective for views of Dow Crag. Two choices now present themselves- easy via Goat's Hause, or steep via the South Rake (see below). Many walkers will also reach the fell using the good paths from The Old Man of Coniston and Brim Fell.

== Rock climbing ==
Dow Crag is composed of rhyolite and has an approximately 100 metre rock face with over 100 recognised climbing routes including:

- Giant's Crawl
- 'C' Ordinary Route
- Hopkinson's Crack
- Eliminate 'A'
- Leopard's Crawl
- Nimrod
- Side Walk
- Holocaust
- Tumble
- The Shining Path

South Rake is a scree filled gully towards the south of the crag, and is the easiest way up the crag, being a fairly easy scramble, especially for the less agile.

Dow is noted for being particularly cold, bleak and exposed, especially in summer, typical of the Cumbrian season. Dow Crag is usually approached from the Walna Scar road which connects the Duddon Valley with Coniston.

See UK Climbing crag database
