= Bow Fell, Cumberland =

Painting by John Constable

- Artist: John Constable
- Year: 1807
- Type: Oil on canvas, landscape painting
- Dimensions: 20.4 cm × 25.5 cm (8.0 in × 10.0 in)
- Location: Clark Art Institute; Massachusetts

Bow Fell, Cumberland is an 1807 landscape painting by the British artist John Constable. It depicts a view of Bowfell in the county of Cumberland. Located in the Southern Fells, Constable made sketches on the spot when on a two month visit to the Lake District in 1806.

It was one of three paintings of the Lake District by Constable that featured in the Royal Academy's Summer Exhibition of 1807 at Somerset House, a change from his usual views of the River Stour in Suffolk. Today it is in the collection of the Clark Art Institute in Massachusetts, having been acquired in 2007.

== See also ==
- List of paintings by John Constable

== Bibliography ==
- Bailey, Anthony. John Constable: A Kingdom of his Own. Random House, 2012.
- Gray, Anne & Gage, John. Constable: Impressions of Land, Sea and Sky. National Gallery of Australia, 2006.
- Hamilton, James. Constable: A Portrait. Hachette UK, 2022.
- Key, Sydney J. John Constable, His Life and Work. Phoenix House, 1948.
