= Southern Fells =

Region of the Cumbrian Mountains

Coordinates: 54.471°N 3.144°W

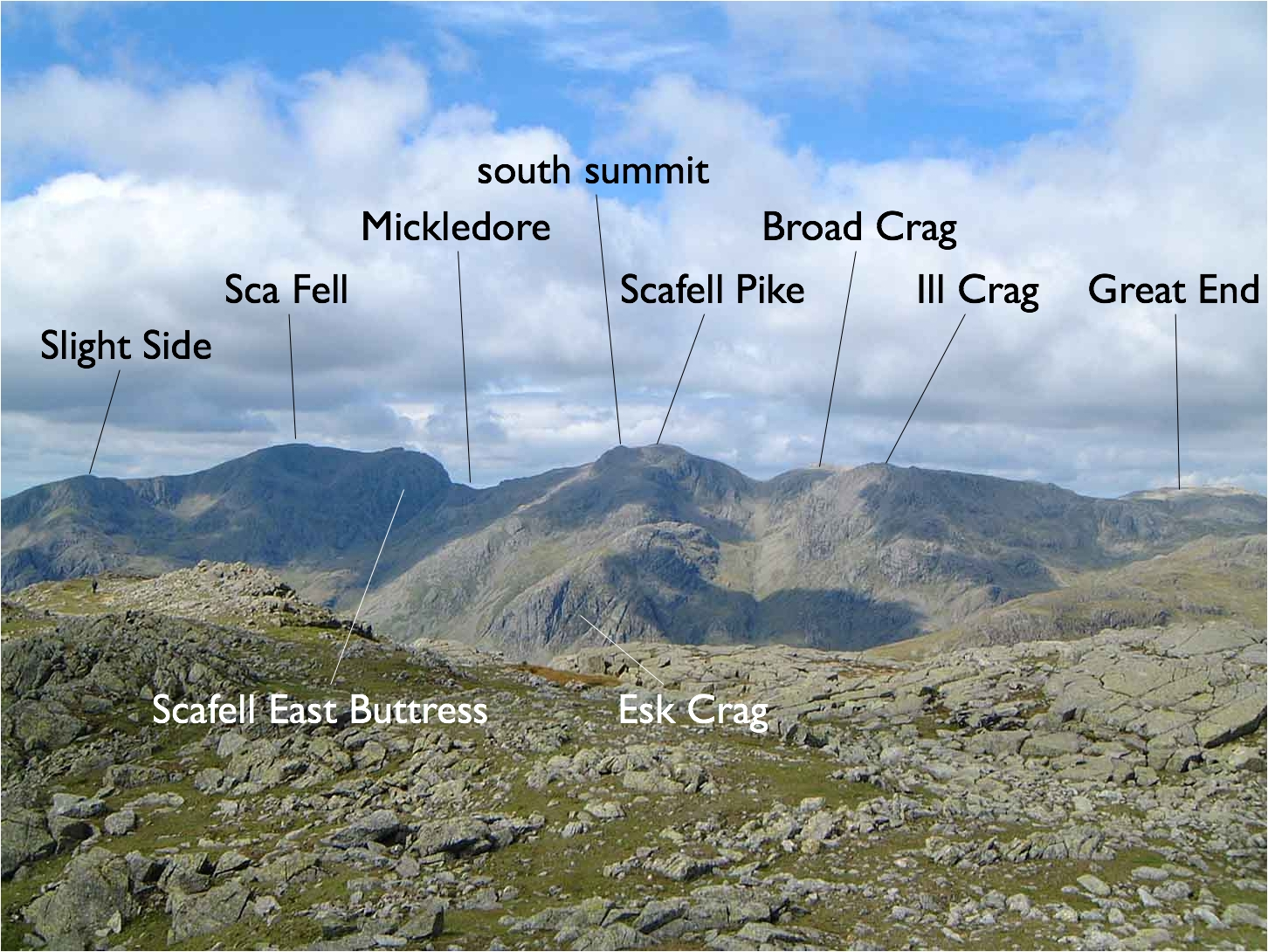
The Scafells

The Southern Fells are a part of the Cumbrian Mountains in the Lake District of England. Including Scafell Pike, the highest peak in England, they occupy a broad area to the south of Great Langdale, Borrowdale and Wasdale. High and rocky towards the centre of the Lake District, the Southern Fells progressively take on a moorland character toward the south-west. In the south-east are the well-known Furness Fells, their heavily quarried flanks rising above Coniston Water.

== Partition of the Lakeland fells ==
The Lake District is a National Park in the north west of the country which, in addition to its lakes, contains a complex range of hills. These are known locally as fells and range from low hills to the highest ground in England. Hundreds of tops exist and many writers have attempted to draw up definitive lists. In doing so the compilers frequently divide the range into smaller areas to aid their description.

The most influential of all such authors was Alfred Wainwright whose Pictorial Guide to the Lakeland Fells series has sold in excess of 2 million copies, being in print continuously since the first volume was published in 1952. Wainwright divided the fells into seven geographical areas, each surrounded by valleys and low passes. While any such division must be arbitrary- and later writers have deviated to a greater or lesser extent from this blueprint- Wainwright's sevenfold division remains the best known partitioning of the fells into 'sub ranges', each with its own characteristics. The Southern Fells are one of these divisions, covered by volume 4 of Wainwright's work.

== Boundaries ==
Of all Wainwright's boundary decisions, the outer perimeter of the Southern Fells is the most often debated. Two ridges continue south west on either side of the Duddon Valley, the longer ending only at the Irish Sea in the terminal height of Black Combe. Wainwright however chose to excise a wide area of fell from his guidebooks, declaring that "south and west from Green Crag the scenery quickly deteriorates. This summit has therefore been taken as the boundary of fellwalking country for the purposes of this book and the territory southwest omitted from the map". He makes similar statements regarding the fells to the south of Dow Crag on the parallel Coniston ridge. The later Fellranger guides mirror part of Wainwright's Southern Fells in the curiously named "Mid-Western Fells" volume, and then all of the fells south from Wrynose and Hardknott Passes to the sea in a further volume, "The Southern Fells". The author, Mark Richards, notes his differences with Wainwright in the introduction. Birkett simply includes everything without comment. Even Wainwright ultimately relented and included the southern extremities in an eighth guidebook, "The Outlying fells of Lakeland" (1974).

The northern boundaries are clear, beginning on the west with Wastwater and rising up beyond the head of Wasdale to Sty Head Pass, the popular walkers' route to Borrowdale. Across the border on this side are Great Gable and the Western Fells. The boundary continues north to Stonethwaite in Borrowdale, before turning sharply south-east along the Langstrath branch of that valley, including the long ridge of Glaramara within the Southern Fells. At the head of Langstrath the perimeter crosses Stake Pass, another pedestrian route, and sweeps eastward down Great Langdale to Windermere. Stake Pass provides the high level link to the Langdale Pikes in the Central Fells. Although falling within the Southern Fells area, Wainwright makes no mention of the low hills between Coniston and Windermere in the Pictorial Guides. These appear, somewhat illogically, within his Outlying Fells volume.

== Topography ==
The Southern Fells occupy a broad sector of the circular Lake District massif, trending a little to the west of centre and about 10 miles (16 km) across in either direction. In addition to the perimeter dales, Eskdale and the Duddon Valley provide further subdivision flowing out from the centre of the district.

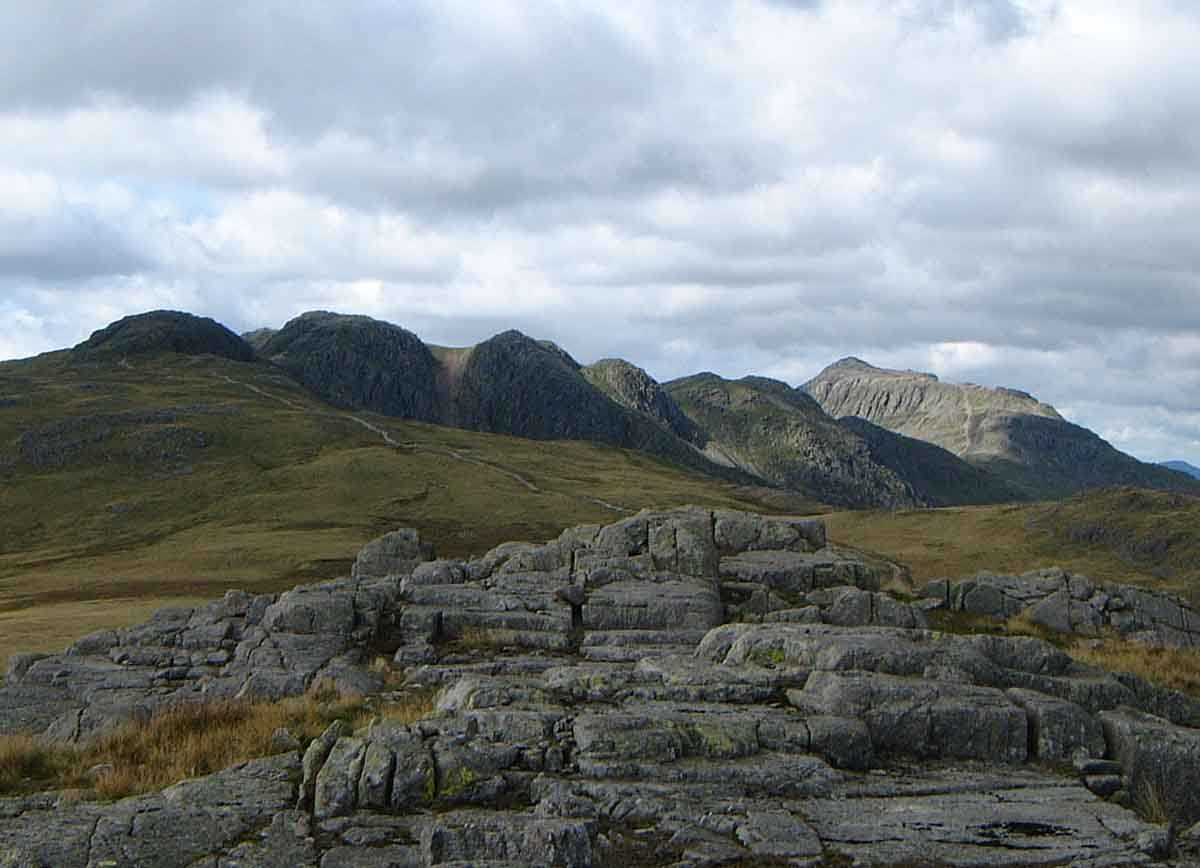
Crinkle Crags (left) and Bowfell from Cold Pike

In the north, surrounding the head of Eskdale, are the Scafells. Also standing above the valleys of Wasdale, Borrowdale and Great Langdale, this high cirque is open to the south and contains England's highest ground. The range begins on the west with Slight Side before rising to the summits of Scafell, Scafell Pike and Great End. Across the gap of Esk Hause and enclosing the eastern side of Eskdale are Esk Pike, Bowfell and Crinkle Crags. Satellites to this main ridge are Lingmell above Wasdale and the Allen Crags- Glaramara- Rosthwaite Fell ridge jutting deep into Borrowdale. East of Bowfell is Rossett Pike providing the link to the Central Fells. More loosely connected are Illgill Head and Whin Rigg, the fells forming the famous Wastwater Screes.

South from Crinkle Crags, between Eskdale and the Duddon, are Hard Knott, Harter Fell and Green Crag. A second ridge falls south easterly from Crinkles over Cold Pike and Pike O'Blisco, crosses the motor road of Wrynose Pass and then rises to Great Carrs, the first of the Coniston (or Furness) Fells. The remainder of this group comprises Swirl How, Grey Friar, Wetherlam, Brim Fell, Coniston Old Man and Dow Crag, together forming the watershed between Coniston and the Duddon. To the east are the low outliers of Holme Fell and Black Fell.

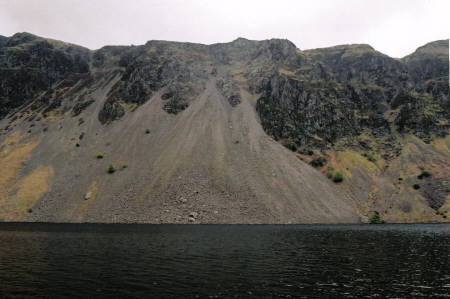
Illgill Head and the Wastwater Screes

== Access for walkers ==
The high Southern Fells can be accessed from many of the principal walking centres of Lakeland, namely the heads of Wasdale, Borrowdale, Langdale and Eskdale. Sty Head, the Stake, Rossett Gill, Grains Gill, Burnmoor Tarn and Esk Hause provide pedestrian links between all of these valleys, many miles apart by road.

The main paths from Seathwaite or Wasdale Head to Scafell Pike, and from Great Langdale up Bowfell are heavily used, as is the 'Tourist Route' up Coniston Old Man. These tops will be busy on almost any day of the year. Away from these famous tops however it is possible to find quieter walking, particularly to the south.

== See also ==
- Eastern Fells
- Far Eastern Fells
- Central Fells
- Northern Fells
- North Western Fells
- Western Fells
