= Swirl How =

Fell in the Lake District, Cumbria, England

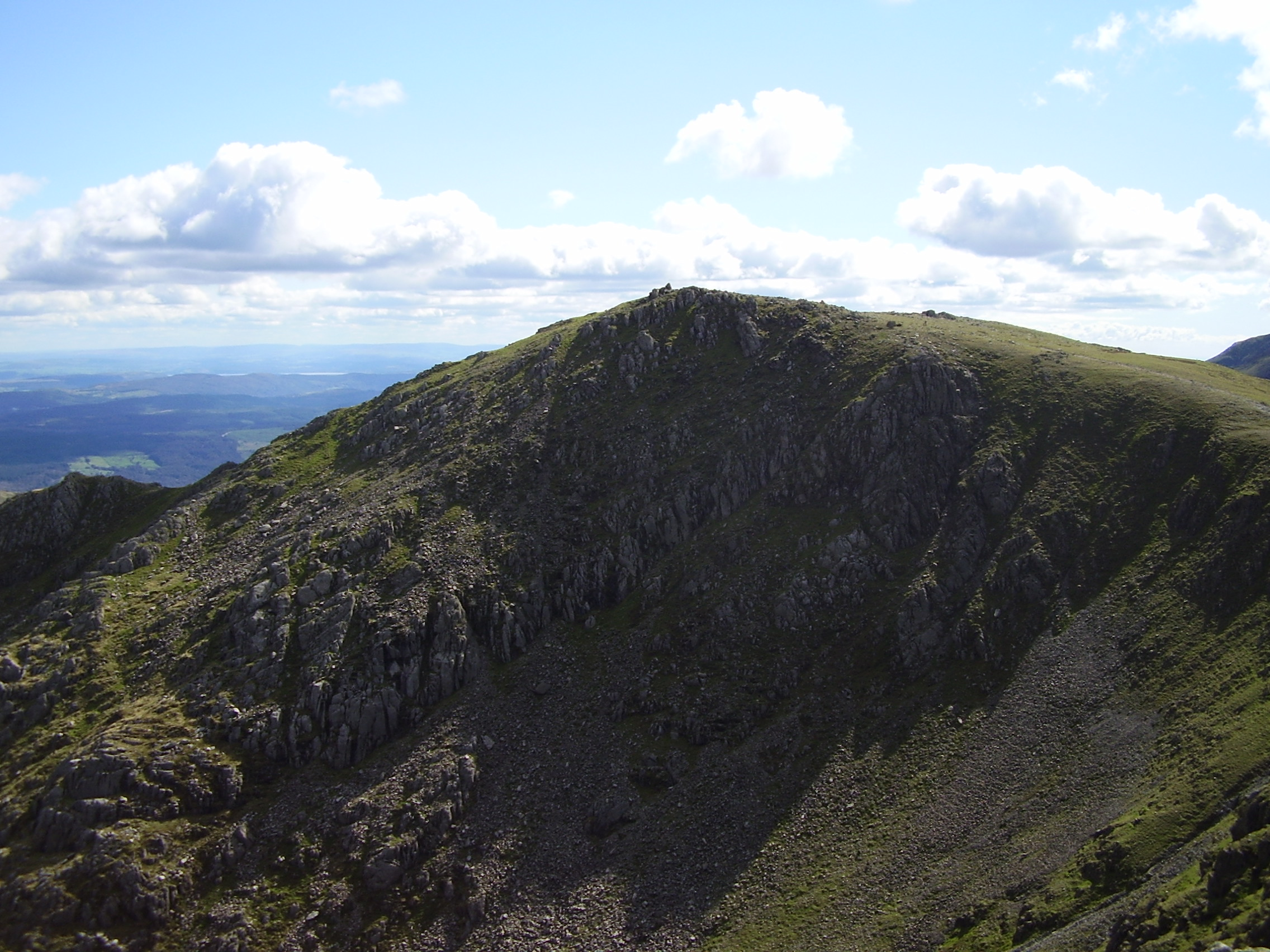
- Swirl How from Great Carrs

Highest point
- Elevation: 802.42 m (2,632.6 ft)
- Prominence: c. 112 m (disputed)
- Listing: Wainwright, Hewitt, Nuttall
- Coordinates: 54°23′44″N 3°07′16″W

Geography
- Location within the Lake District
- Location: Cumbria, England (traditionally Lancashire)
- Parent range: Lake District, Southern Fells
- OS grid: NY273006
- Topo map: OS Landranger 97, Explorer OL6

Swirl How is a fell in the English Lake District. It stands between Coniston and the Duddon Valley in the southern part of the District. It rivals the Old Man of Coniston as the highest point within the traditional County Palatine of Lancashire (it has been administered since 1974 as part of Cumbria for local government purposes).

The Coniston (or Furness) Fells form the watershed between Coniston Water and the Duddon valley to the west. The range begins at Wrynose Pass and runs south for around 10 miles (16 km) before petering out at Broughton in Furness on the Duddon Estuary. Alfred Wainwright in his influential Pictorial Guide to the Lakeland Fells took only the northern half of the range as Lakeland proper, consigning the lower fells to the south to a supplementary work The Outlying Fells of Lakeland. Swirl How being a significant high point of the Coniston Fells therefore qualifies as one of the 214 Wainwrights. Later guidebook writers have chosen to include the whole range in their main volumes.

== Height ==
A detailed survey on 24 May 2018 measured the height of Swirl How to be 802.42 metres (2,632 ft 7 in).

The same survey also measured the height of nearby The Old Man of Coniston and found the highest visible natural ground to be also 802.42 metres (2,632 ft 7 in). The height of the ground on the summit plinth (man-made ground) is 803.53 metres (2,636 ft 3 in). The measurements were reported with a measurement uncertainty of plus or minus 0.05 metres (2 in).

The surveyors state: "if one considers the area covered by the plinth on Coniston Old Man and the observation that the highest rock is probably covered by it then we believe the evidence strongly suggests there is higher ground beneath it and that, therefore, Coniston Old Man should retain its current status" [as being the highest of the Furness Fells and the historic county top of Lancashire].

As of 2020, Ordnance Survey maps show The Old Man of Coniston with a height of 803m, and Swirl How at 802m.

Whichever of the two is the higher is the highest point in the historic County Palatine of Lancashire and is the highest point in the Furness Fells, and the twelfth most prominent mountain in England.

== Topography ==
Swirl How sends out ridges to the four points of the compass, each leading to further fells. Consequently, it also feeds the headwaters of four valleys.

The ridge northward to Great Carrs is named Top of Broad Slack, Broad Slack being a ferociously steep grass slope climbing out of the Greenburn valley between neighbouring crags. The ridge is a grassy plateau with a pronounced downward tilt to the west. The eastern edge is precipitous, curving around the head of Greenburn. On the journey to Great Carrs the path passes a memorial. This is the site of a wartime aircrash and bears the sad remains of a Royal Canadian Air Force Handley Page Halifax bomber. The undercarriage, together with a wooden cross and memorial cairn lies on the top of the ridge with the rest of the wreckage spread down Broad Slack. In his guidebook The Southern Fells Alfred Wainwright suggests that the plane approached from the west, failed to clear the ridge and tumbled down the other side. In fact, the wrecked aircraft came to rest on the western slope; the majority of the wreckage was subsequently pushed over the edge of broad slack by the RAF salvage crew, in order to make it less prominent and reduce the likelihood of overflying pilots spotting the wreckage and repeatedly reporting the crash. An engine and propeller from the aircraft are preserved at the Ruskin Museum in Coniston. The tilted plateau of the north ridge is triangular in plan, narrowing to a point at Fairfield in the west. This is the col between Swirl How and the ridge's western outlier, Grey Friar. To the north of this ridge are long slopes leading down to the Duddon at Wrynose Bottom.

The main ridge continues southward, stepping down Great and Little How Crags to the depression of Levers Hawse. From here it rises again to Brim Fell with Dow Crag and The Old Man Of Coniston beyond. To the west of the Hawse is the valley of Tarn Head Beck, the main feeder of Seathwaite Tarn, a reservoir in a side valley of the Duddon system. This was originally a much smaller waterbody, but was dammed early in the 20th century to provide drinking water for the Barrow-in-Furness area. The dam is almost 400 yards (370 m) long and is concrete cored with slate buttresses, the resulting depth of the tarn being around 80 feet (24 m). Water is not abstracted directly from the tarn, but flows some distance downriver to an off-take weir. To the east of Levers Hawse is Levers Water. This smaller tarn has also been raised by damming, but in this case the original user was the Coniston Copper Mines. Following the decline of mining in the late 19th century a water treatment plant was eventually built and the tarn now supplies drinking water for Coniston village.

The eastern arm of Swirl How leads down the stony slope of Prison Band to the depression at Swirl Hawse. From here it rises over the subsidiary top of Black Sails to the main summit of Wetherlam. Swirl Hawse Beck runs south from this ridge to feed Levers Water, whilst to the north of Wetherlam is Greenburn.

== Geology ==
The summit ridge exposes welded rhyolitic tuff and lapilli tuff of the Long Top Member, interspersed with bands of andesitic lapilli tuff of the Wetside Edge Member.

== Summit ==
The summit of Swirl How is marked by a fine cairn on a stony top, built close to the Greenburn edge of the ridge. The view to the north takes in massed ranks of fells while in other directions the Isle of Man, Morecambe Bay and Pennines can be seen.

== Ascents ==
Direct ascents can be made via Levers Hawse to the south or Swirl Hawse to the east. Both can be gained from Coniston and Swirl Hawse is also a practicable objective from Little Langdale. The right of way shown up the western (Duddon) side of Levers Hawse does not exist as a path on the ground. Many walkers will arrive on Swirl How via one of the surrounding fells, all four ridges carrying fair paths.

== Name ==
The origin of the name Swirl How is obscure. A Norwegian dialect word svirle meaning to swirl or whirl around, suggests that there may have been an Old Norse origin. How is believed to derive from the Old Norse word haugr meaning hill or mound.
