= Seathwaite =

There are four localities within the county of Cumbria in North West England named Seathwaite:

- Seathwaite, Allerdale, a hamlet in Borrowdale
- Seathwaite, South Lakeland, a village in the Duddon Valley
- Seathwaite Fell, a hill at the head of Borrowdale
- Seathwaite Tarn, a lake near the village in the Duddon Valley
