= Levers Water =

Lake in Cumbria, England

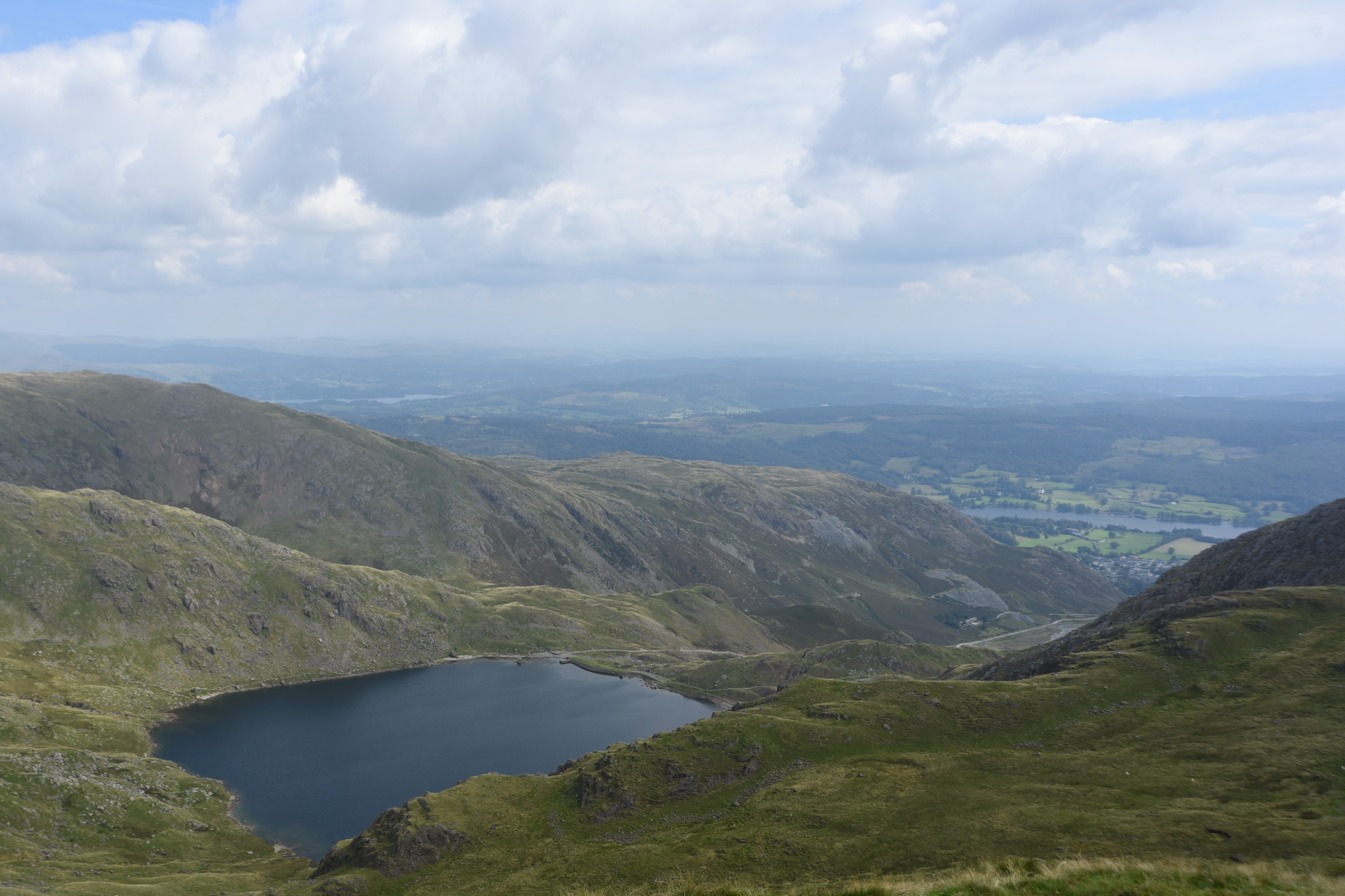

- Location in the Lake District National Park Location in South Lakeland, Cumbria
- Location: Lake District
- Coordinates: 54.384°N 3.111°W
- Primary inflows: Swirl Hawse Beck, Cove Beck
- Primary outflows: Levers Water Beck
- Basin countries: United Kingdom
- Surface area: 14 hectares (35 acres)
- Average depth: 7.9 m (26 ft)
- Water volume: 1,071,870 m^{3} (37,853,000 cu ft)
- Surface elevation: 413 metres (1,355 ft)

Levers Water is a small lake in the English Lake District. It is located at the head of the Coppermines Valley, above Coniston village. To its south-west is Raven Tor, a spur of Brim Fell, and to its north-west are Little How Crags and Great How Crags, on the eastern side of the north–south ridge leading to Swirl How.

A dam built in 1717 enlarged the existing tarn to provide water for the mines and for the village below.

A public footpath on the north-east side of the lake connects the Coppermines Valley to Swirl Hawse. This traverses an area of vulnerable peatland and a path here was rebuilt in 2023 to help protect the landscape from erosion by walkers. To the south-west, a path leads up Gill Cove to Levers Hawse on the main ridge of the Coniston Fells.
