= Bowfell =

Mountain in the English Lake District, Cumbria, England

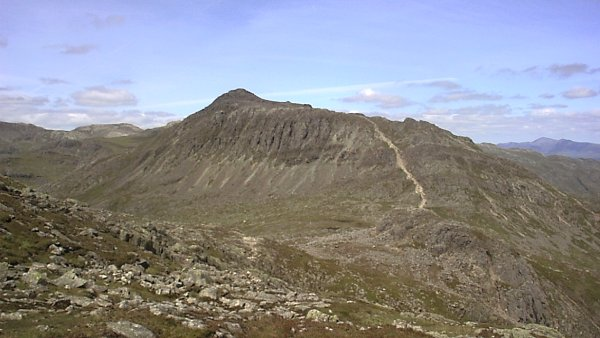
- Bowfell from Shelter Crags, about 1 mi (1.5 km) south along the ridge

Highest point
- Elevation: 902 m (2,959 ft)
- Prominence: 146 m (479 ft)
- Parent peak: Scafell Pike
- Listing: Hewitt, Nuttall, Wainwright, Sub-Marilyn
- Coordinates: 54°26′51″N 3°09′57″W

Geography
- Location within the Lake District Location within the former Borough of Copeland Location within the former South Lakeland district
- Location: Cumbria, England
- Parent range: Lake District, Southern Fells
- OS grid: NY245064
- Topo map: OS Landrangers 89, 90 Explorer OL6

Listed summits of Bowfell
Name	Grid ref	Height	Status
Bowfell North Top	NY244070	866 metres (2,840 ft)	Nuttall

Bowfell (named Bow Fell on Ordnance Survey maps) is a pyramid-shaped mountain lying at the heart of the English Lake District, in the Southern Fells area. It is the eighth-highest mountain in the Lake District and one of the most popular of the Lake District fells for walkers. It is listed in Alfred Wainwright's 'best half dozen' Lake District fells.

== Topography ==
The Southern Fells include the highest ground in England, a horseshoe which begins with Scafell and Scafell Pike in the west and then curves around the north of Upper Eskdale to take in Great End, Esk Pike, Bowfell and Crinkle Crags.

In addition to Eskdale, Bowfell has a footing in two other well known valleys. It stands at the head of Great Langdale — its east ridge dividing the two branches of Mickleden and Oxendale — while to the north is the Langstrath branch of Borrowdale. From all of these valleys Bowfell presents a striking profile with a conical top resting upon a wider summit plateau.

To the north-west of Bowfell the main ridge drops to the depression of Ore Gap, named after its reddish soil, rich in haematite. Below the col on the northern side is Angle Tarn. This round waterbody occupies a corrie beneath Hanging Knotts, small trout lurking in its 50-foot (15 m) depths. Its outflow is a tributary of the Langstrath Beck, making for Stonethwaite. To the south of Ore Gap runs Yeastyrigg Gill, the main headwater of Lingcove Beck, flowing into the fastness of upper Eskdale. Beyond the Gap the ridge makes the stony three-tiered climb to the white-rocked summit of Esk Pike.

Southward of Bowfell the ridge falls steeply to Three Tarns, the col separating it from Crinkle Crags. The depression takes its name from a number of small pools, often two, but sometimes more after rain. Busco Sike flowing to the east is the longest feeder of Oxendale Beck in Great Langdale.

Bowfell sends out two subsidiary ridges to the east. The Band is a descending rigg starting from the southern end of the summit plateau. It is this ridge which divides Oxendale from Mickleden, making straight for Stool End Farm on the valley floor. The Band has a minor top about halfway down named White Stones, although most guidebooks do not consider it notable. The second ridge begins at the northern end of the summit plateau and crosses Rossett Hause, a sharp depression at the head of Rossett Gill, to make for Rossett Pike. The continuation of this ridge provides the connection to the Central Fells, forming the northern wall of Great Langdale as it crosses Martcrag Moor, bound for the Langdale Pikes.

== Geology ==
The predominant rocks on Bowfell are the volcaniclastic sandstones of the Seathwaite Fell Formation, with interbeds of andesite outcropping near the summit. The pebbly sandstone and breccias of the Pavey Ark Member also cross the fell.

== Summit ==
The summit area is a ridge running north–south with the final pyramid near the south-west corner and crags on three sides. The southern face is formed by Bowfell Links, a wall of rock scarred by nine vertical gullies and with corresponding tongues of scree at its foot, all of which are loose rock channels. The eastern face includes Flat Crag, Cambridge Crag and the Bowfell Buttress, the latter two providing good climbing. Flat Crag includes the Great Slab, a tilted sheet of rock. At the base of Great Slab a spring gushes forth from the bare rock: Wainwright claims, "And no water anywhere else tastes better." Below these faces runs the Climber's Traverse, a narrow path providing a high-level walking route to the summit from the highest point of The Band. This largely horizontal line contours around beneath many of Bowfell's steeper crags, finally reaching the summit via a rocky route known as the River of Boulders, running parallel to the Great Slab. Finally on the north- east corner of the summit ridge is Hanging Knotts, a complex series of faces and outcrops looking down upon Angle Tarn.

The highest point carries not so much a cairn as a rearrangement of some loose rock at the apex of the pyramid. Every major group of fells in Lakeland is seen from this vantage-point — the Helvellyn range from end to end and the Langdale Pikes across Langdale — according to Wainwright, the piece of the view is Scafell Pike towering above Eskdale.

- Panorama

== Ascents ==
The Band provides the most popular means of ascent. Other routes from Langdale climb via Rossett Gill and Three Tarns. Bowfell can be reached from Stonethwaite via Angle Tarn although the way is long. Equally time-consuming although perhaps more picturesque is the long march up Eskdale from Brotherikeld, gaining the ridge at either Ore Gap or Three Tarns. Indirect climbs can also be made via Crinkle Crags, Esk Pike or Rossett Pike. The summit can also be reached from the top of Wrynose Pass by following the Right of Way starting close to the Three Shire Stone and heading in a northwesterly direction. The route takes in the summits of Cold Pike and Long Top.

== Gallery ==
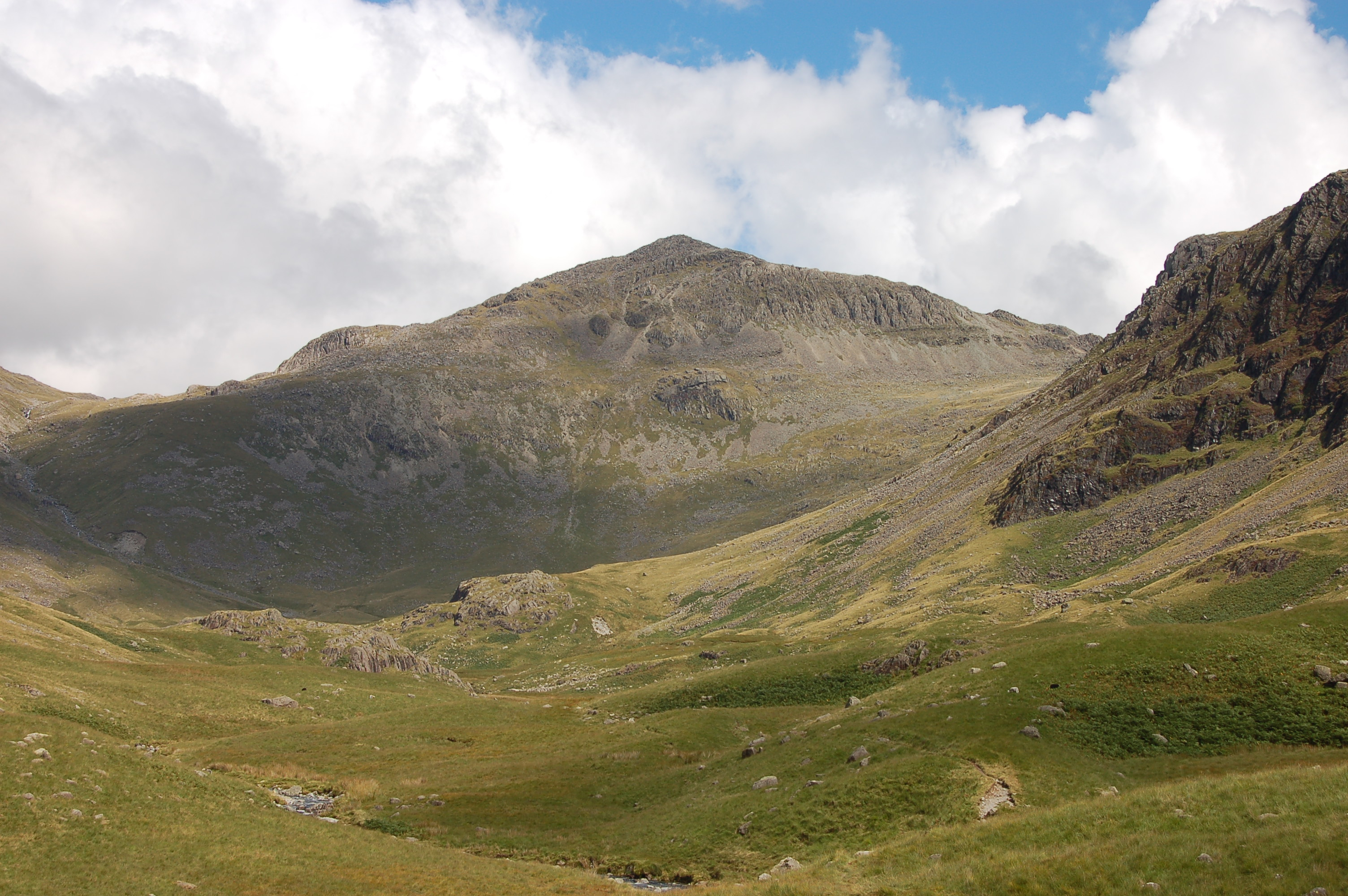
The pyramid shape of Bowfell viewed from Lingcove

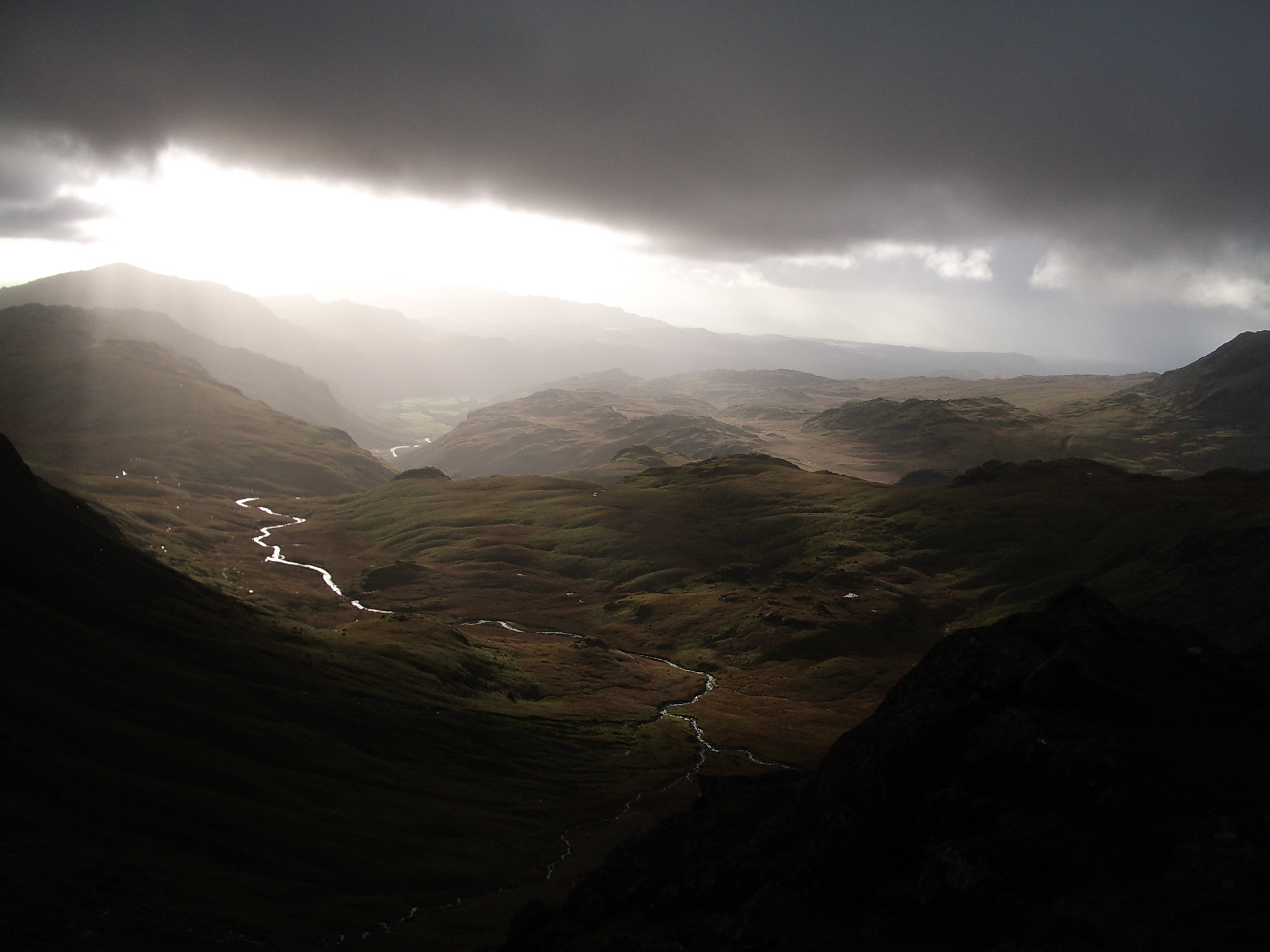
Looking south-west from just under Bow Fell summit towards Eskdale under darkening skies

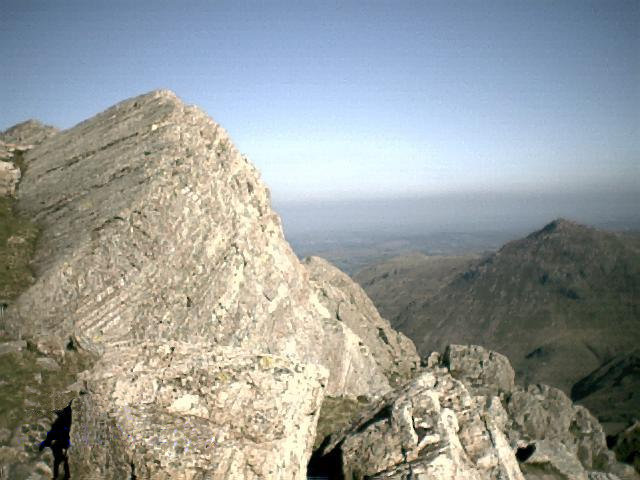
The view south-east from the Great Slab, looking towards Pike of Blisco

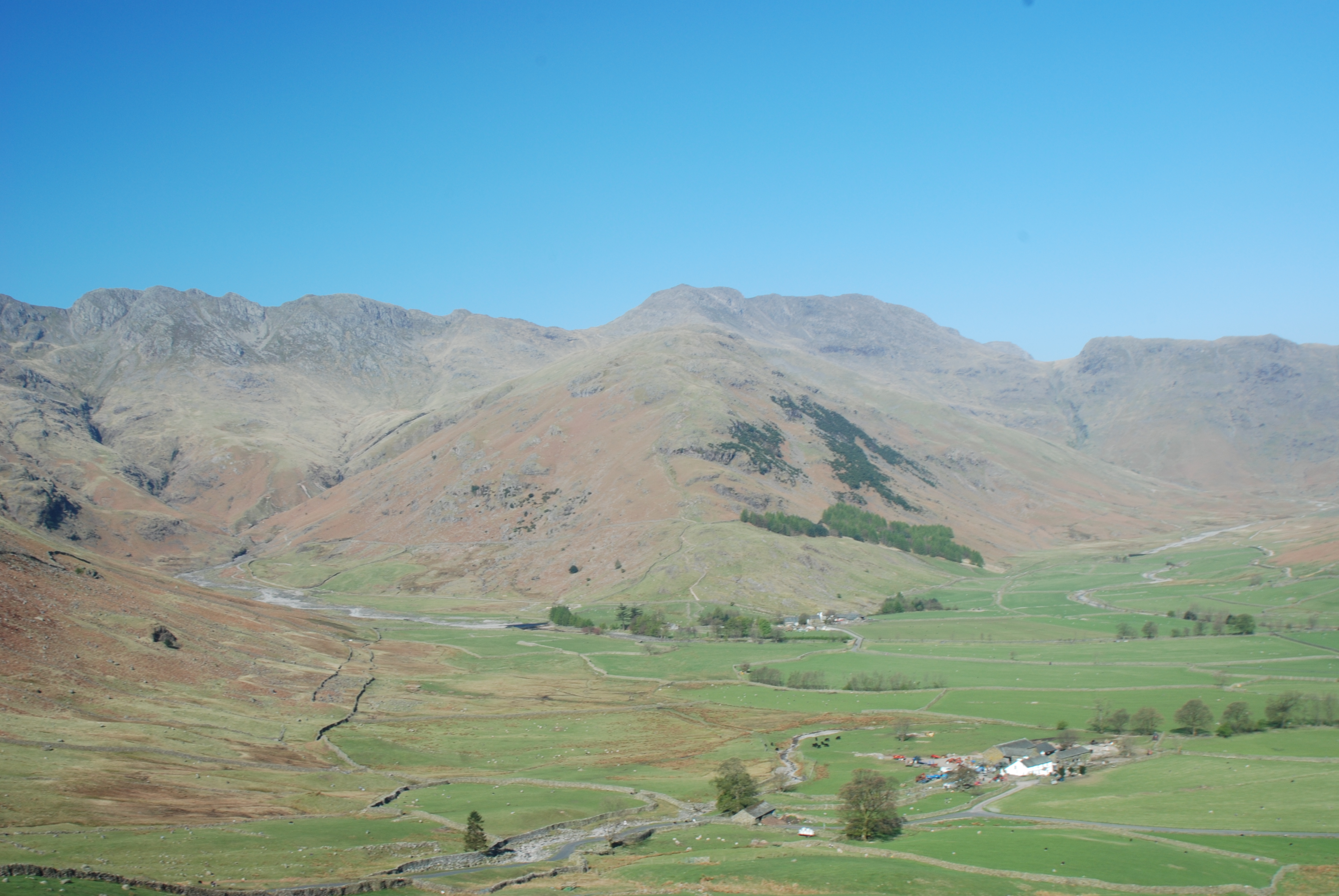
Bowfell from Great Langdale

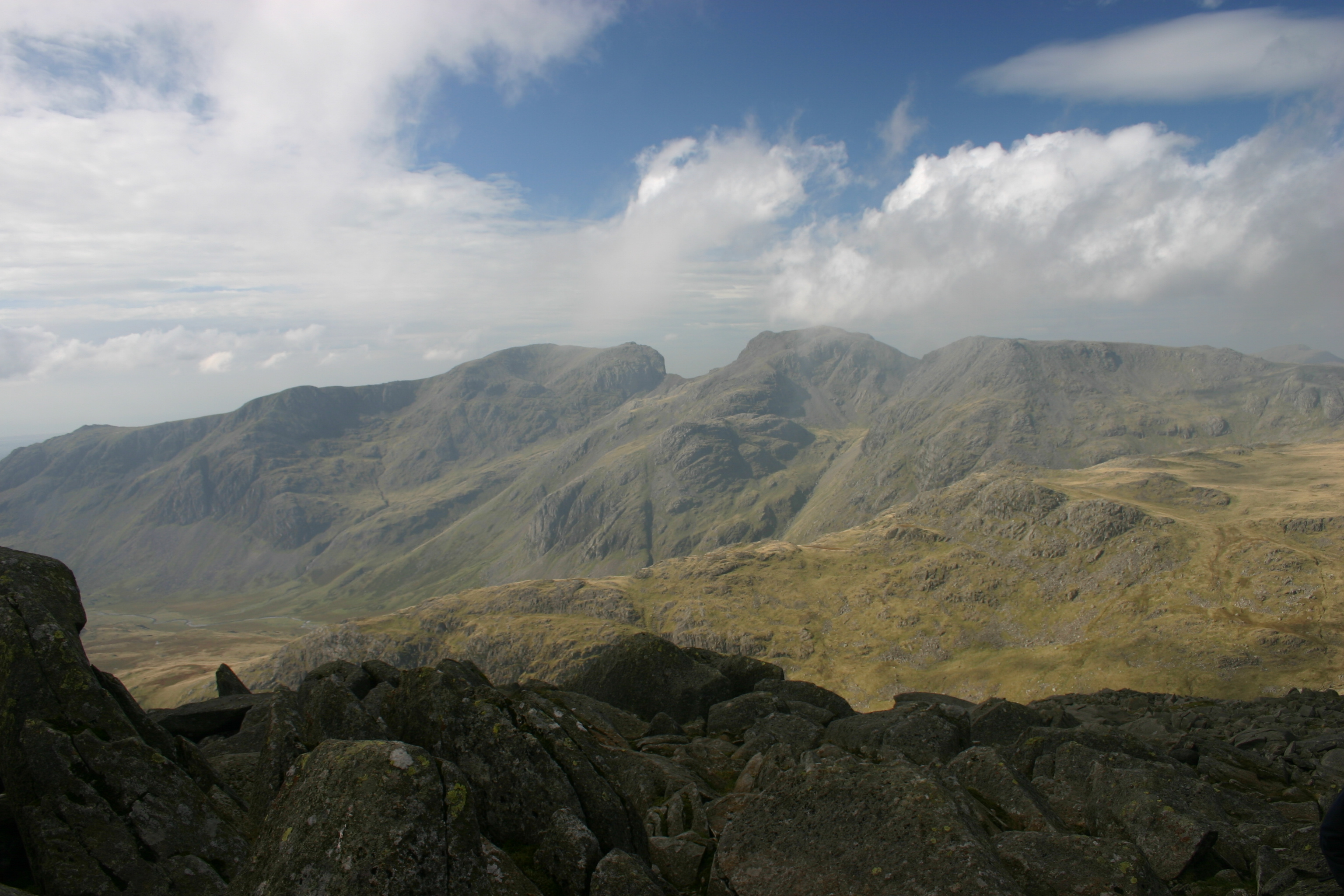
Scafells from Bowfell

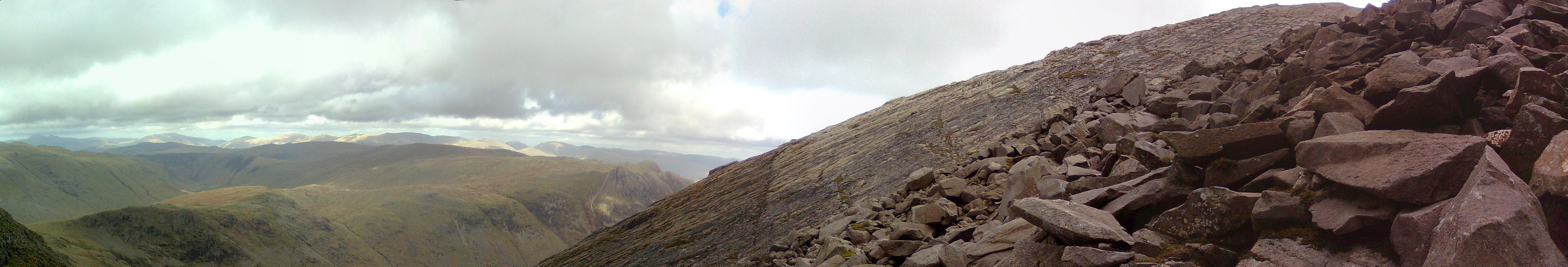
Great Slab on Bowfell, from the 'river of boulders'

Bow Fell, Cumberland by John Constable, 1807
