= Brim Fell =

Fell in the Lake District, Cumbria, England

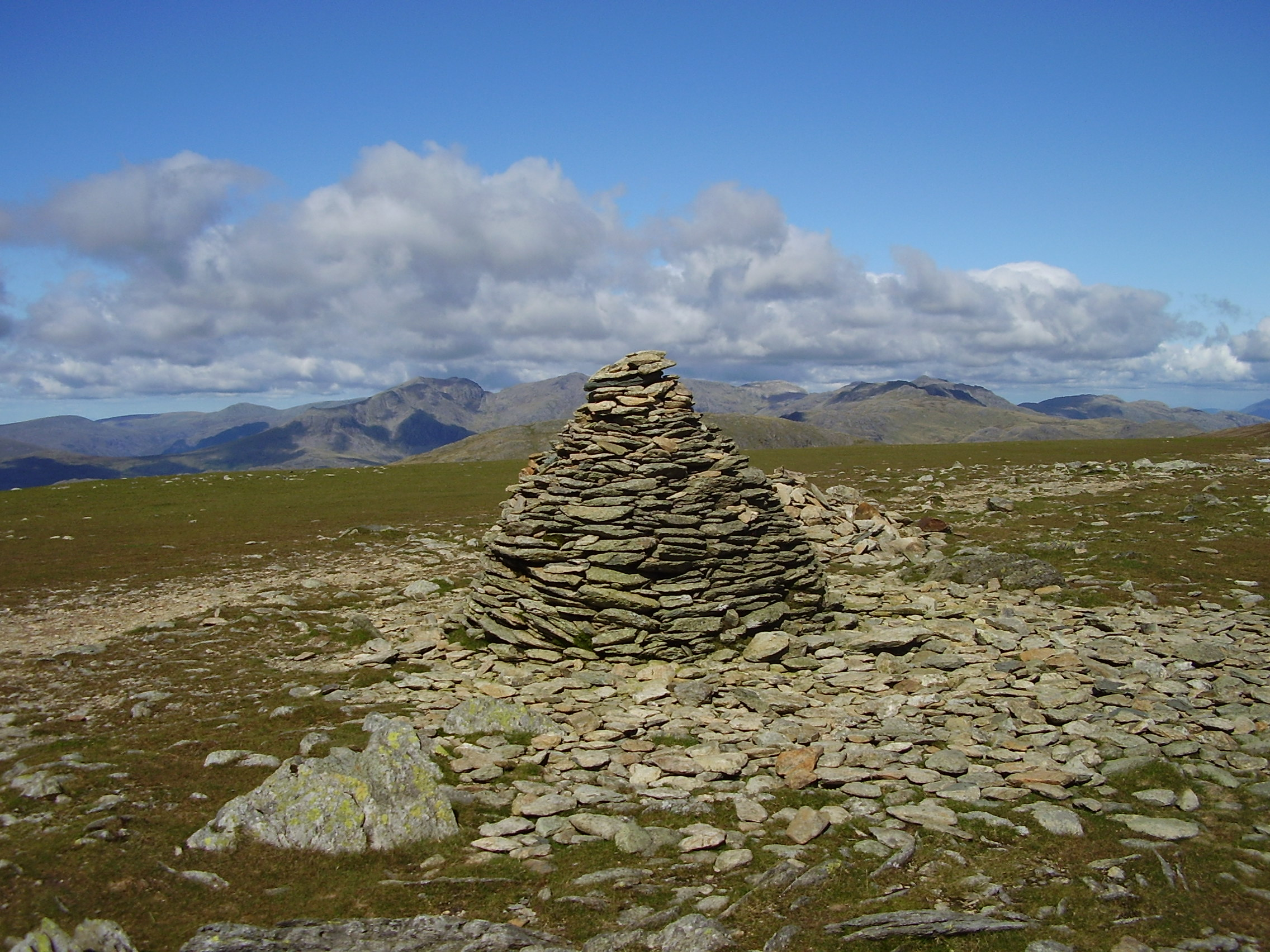
- Brim Fell summit

Highest point
- Elevation: 796 m (2,612 ft)
- Prominence: c. 25 m
- Parent peak: The Old Man of Coniston
- Listing: Wainwright, Nuttall
- Coordinates: 54°22′40″N 3°07′26″W

Geography
- Location within the Lake District
- Location: Cumbria, England
- Parent range: Lake District, Southern Fells
- OS grid: SD271986
- Topo map: OS Landranger 89,90, Explorer OL6

Brim Fell is a fell in the English Lake District. It stands to the west of Coniston village in the southern part of the District.

== Topography ==
The Coniston (or Furness) Fells form the watershed between Coniston Water and the Duddon valley to the west. The range begins in the north at Wrynose Pass and runs south for around 10 miles (16 km) before petering out at Broughton in Furness on the Duddon Estuary. Alfred Wainwright in his influential Pictorial Guide to the Lakeland Fells took only the northern half of the range as Lakeland proper, consigning the lower fells to the south to a supplementary work The Outlying Fells of Lakeland. Brim Fell occupies a position in the northern section and therefore qualifies as one of the 214 Wainwrights. Later, guidebook writers have chosen to include the whole range in their main volumes.

The higher northern part of the Coniston range can be likened to an inverted 'Y' with Brim Fell at the connecting point of the three arms. To the north are Swirl How, Great Carrs and Grey Friar, south east is the short spur terminating at The Old Man of Coniston and to the south west the range continues over Dow Crag to the lower hills beyond.

Brim Fell is unusual in having no footing on the valley floor on either side of the ridge. On the east its boundary streams converge at 800 feet (240 m) and the flanks of Coniston Old Man and Wetherlam continue to the lake. Above the Duddon, Brim Fell is nipped off by Dow Crag and Grey Friar at an even greater altitude. The area of the fell is therefore small, but full of interest.

The western slopes are relatively smooth and fall to Tarn Head Beck. This runs parallel to the ridge and is the main feeder of Seathwaite Tarn, a reservoir in a side valley of the Duddon system. This was originally a much smaller waterbody, but was dammed early in the 20th century to provide drinking water for the Barrow-in-Furness area. The dam is almost 400 yards (370 m) long and is concrete cored with slate buttresses, the resulting depth of the tarn being around 80 feet (24 m). Water is not abstracted directly from the tarn, but flows some distance downriver to an off-take weir. On the slopes of Brim Fell, above the head of the reservoir, are the remains of Seathwaite Tarn Mine. This was worked for copper in the mid-19th century, and also appears as a location in the novel The Plague Dogs by Richard Adams.

The ridge north from Brim Fell narrows to the depression at Levers Hawse (2,250 feet, 690 m) before climbing again over the rougher ground of Great How Crags to the summit of Swirl How. To the south, trending south east across a broad plateau is The Old Man of Coniston, the reascent being negligible. Halfway between Brim Fell and 'The Old Man' a further ridge branches off due west, dropping steeply to Goat's Hawse (2,130 feet, 650 m), before swinging south around Goat's Water to Dow Crag.

In contrast to the western slopes and ridge-top grass promenade, the Coniston face is all crag. A short high level spur juts out from the summit, ending in the shattered cliffs of Raven Tor. To either side of this promontory is a corrie tarn, Low Water to the south and Levers Water to the north. Low Water is the smaller, its depth increased by a stone faced dam built by the nearby slate quarries. The outflow drops via a fine waterfall to join Levers Water Beck a mile down stream. Levers Water was also dammed in times past for industrial use (in this case the Coniston Coppermines), but now provides domestic supply for Coniston village. The stone faced dam has increased its depth to some 125 feet (38 m). Running parallel to the ridge below Low Water is an unusual lateral valley, named "Boulder Valley" on Ordnance Survey maps due to the number of large erratics on its floor.

== Geology ==
The summit is formed from the bedded andesitic tuff and andesite of the Duddon Hall Formation. Working northwards up the ridge the rhyolitic tuffs and lapilli tuffs of the Long Top Member are revealed. Rhyolitic tuffs also make up the Paddy End Member in the Coppermines Valley.

The valley of Levers Water Beck below Brim Fell holds part of the Coniston Coppermines, a huge complex of shafts and tunnels extending over a square mile. The mine was at its most productive in the 1850s, declining in output until closure in 1915. Since then there have been occasional attempts at reopening, principally in 1954, but tourism has gradually taken over as the main activity in the valley. The mines exploited a number of veins, the copper-bearing mineral chalcopyrite being the main ore, although some nickel, cobalt and lead were also extracted. The Paddy End section of the mine on the lower slopes of Brim Fell was the most productive, with levels passing beneath the bed of Levers Water. Simons Nick, a large (and dangerous) multi-shaft opening above the dam is the most obvious remaining feature.

== Summit ==
The summit of Brim Fell bears a fine slate cairn on grass, with a second big cairn to the north east. The views are extensive although the long whale-backed ridge tends to limit the foreground.

== Ascents ==
Direct ascents are perhaps unusual, most walkers traversing from "The Old Man" to Swirl How, but perfectly possible. The easiest access is from Coniston, climbing via Levers Water to Levers Hawse. Pathless ascents of Raven Tor can also be made from either side for a wilder finish. The Walna Scar Road (Byway open to all traffic) gives access to Goat's Hawse from either side of the ridge and this is the easiest route from the Duddon. Note that a right of way shown on Ordnance Survey maps descending west from Levers Hawse to Seathwaite Tarn does not exist as a path on the ground.
