= Seathwaite Tarn =

Reservoir in the Lake District, Cumbria, England

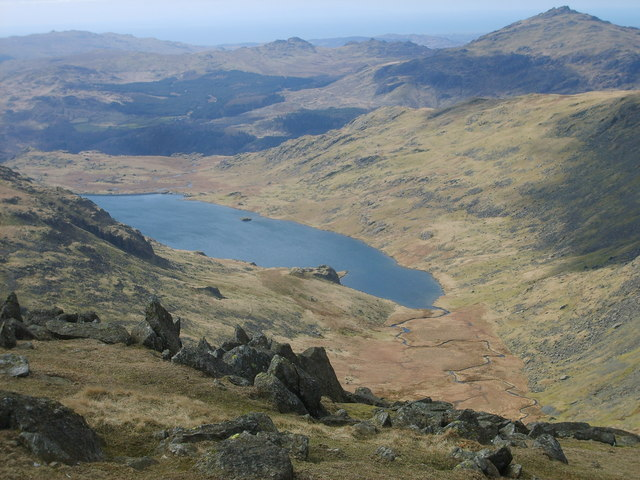

- Location within Cumbria
- Location: Lake District
- Coordinates: 54°22′44.66″N 3°9′17.83″W
- Type: reservoir
- Primary inflows: Tarn Head Beck, Near Gill, Far Gill, Bleaberry Gill
- Primary outflows: Tarn Beck
- Basin countries: United Kingdom
- Surface area: 66 acres (267,093 m^{2})
- Max. depth: 80 feet (24 m)
- Water volume: 2,945,000 m^{3} (104,000,000 cu ft)
- Surface elevation: 1,200 feet (366 m)

Seathwaite Tarn dam
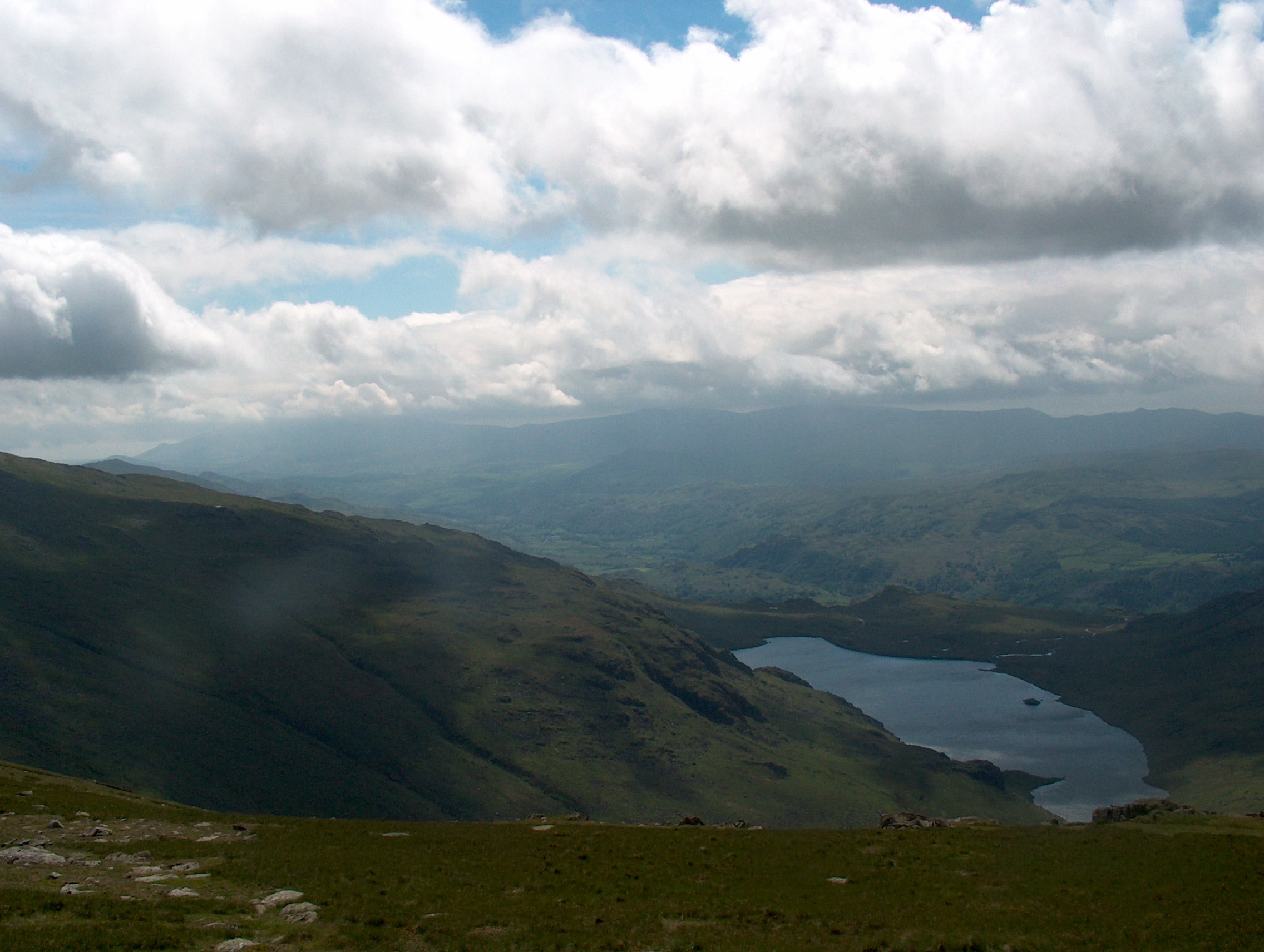
- Interactive map of Seathwaite Tarn dam

Dam and spillways
- Height: 9 m (30 ft)
- Length: 138 m (453 ft)

Seathwaite Tarn is a reservoir in the Furness Fells within the English Lake District. It is located to the south of Grey Friar and to the west of Brim Fell (on the ridge between The Old Man of Coniston and Swirl How) and north east of the village of Seathwaite on the east of the Duddon Valley.

In order to create a source of drinking water the existing tarn was considerably enlarged with a dam in 1904. During the dam construction some of the navvies rioted damaging buildings in the village, several rioters were shot, one dying the next day.

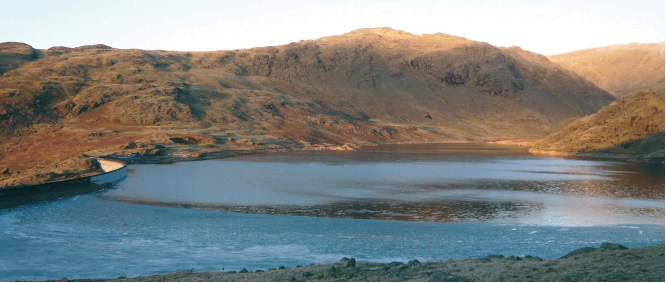
The dam after repairs and reconstruction in 2010

The dam is almost 400 yards (366 m) long and is concrete cored with slate buttresses, the resulting depth of the tarn being around 80 feet (24 m). Water is not abstracted directly from the tarn, but flows some distance downriver to an off-take weir.

On the slopes of Brim Fell, above the head of the reservoir, are the remains of Seathwaite Tarn Mine. This was worked for copper in the mid 19th century, and also appears as a location in the novel The Plague Dogs by Richard Adams. Rocks in the area were the first confirmed occurrence of wittichenite in the British Isles.

Bronze Age ring cairns were found close to Seathwaite Tarn in 2003, these were excavated in 2003 and 2007.

Seathwaite Tarn has suffered from acidification. An experiment in 1992–1993 to reduce the acidification by using a phosphorus-based fertiliser increased the pH from 5.1 to 5.6 and changed the levels of the different species of the rotifer assemblage significantly.

== Repair and reconstruction ==
A statutory inspection was completed by the All Reservoir Panel Engineer in January 2007 during which the Panel Engineer recommended that works be carried out to the concrete face of the dam and that additional measures be implemented to prevent further deterioration of the concrete. Following this recommendation, United Utilities commissioned MWH to undertake works to improve the condition of the existing concrete dams and to help to implement recommendations to ensure that the reservoir would meet the requirements for a Category A reservoir.

Work began in 2010, when the downstream face of the main dam was cleaned and loose concrete, efflorescence and other surface deposits were removed. The concrete face was then protected from further deterioration by using a cementitious repair mortar and siloxane waterproofer. The remedial works on the upstream face included the installation of a PVC geocomposite membrane, geonet drainage layer and associated drainage system to the upstream face of the main dam and the auxiliary overflow. The geomembrane is sealed on the concrete face along the foundation line and on the parapet wall 300 mm above the crest level to cover the joint between the upstream face and the parapet wall. The geomembrane covers a total surface area of 1,100m^{2}.

A Geomembrane drainage system was incorporated into the design to discharge water through 3 holes in the dam. Joints and cracks in the concrete were treated with an acrylic resin where the perimeter seal crosses the joint to prevent reservoir water bypassing the perimeter seal. A reinforced concrete wave wall was constructed to the same dimensions and levels as the existing but it extended into the high ground at the left and right ends of the dam. Finally, riprap erosion protection was laid at the left hand end of the dam to arrest erosion of the embankment. The material for the erosion protection was sourced from the reservoir basin.
