= Walna Scar =

621m high hill in the Lake District in England

Coordinates: 54.364°N 3.173°W

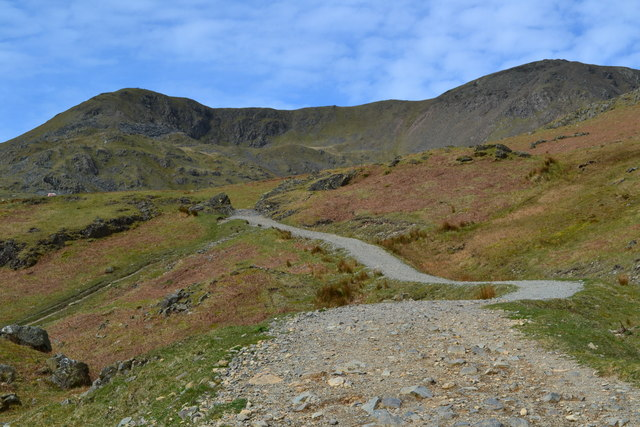
Walna Scar Road in 2014

Walna Scar is a hill in the English Lake District, lying just south of a pass of the same name in the Coniston Hills. Its summit at 2,035 feet (620 m) is only slightly higher than the pass.

Walna Scar is the highest of Wainwright's The Outlying Fells of Lakeland. He describes an ascent from Coniston, continuing past the main summit to a second summit at White Maiden before returning to the south.

Walna Scar can be climbed from Coniston or from the Duddon Valley. Both routes meet at the top pass of the Walna Scar Road, a restricted byway, and then head south to the summit. Walna Scar road was an old packhorse route, termed by Wainwright "the ancient highway over Walna Scar", and formed an important medieval conduit from Furness Abbey to Coniston for the wooltrade, (as well perhaps as having been used in the Bronze Age).

Geologically, Walna Scar contains a rich seam of distinctively striped slate which was quarried until the early 20th century. This was widely used for flooring in the North of England. The quarry can still be seen today on the slopes overlooking the Duddon Valley.

== Literary references ==
- Walna Scar features in the 19th-century novel The Old Church Clock, by Richard Parkinson.
- Andrew Young, in his 1939 poem "The Thunderstorm", wrote of how “...when I came to Walna Pass/ Hailstones hissing and hopping among the grass”.

== See also ==
- Brown Pike
