= Three Shire Stone (Lake District) =

Boundary stone in Cumbria, England

Coordinates: 54.41505°N 3.11518°W

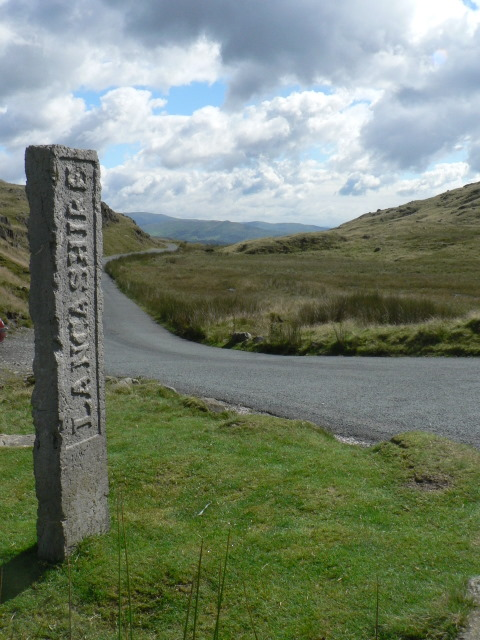
The Three Shire Stone.

The Three Shire Stone is a boundary stone that marks the location where the historic English counties of Lancashire, Cumberland and Westmorland meet. The point is in the English Lake District at the summit of Wrynose Pass; latitude 54°25' North, longitude 3°7' West, elevation 1289 feet (393 m) above sea level (grid reference NY276027).

The limestone monolith was cut in the Lancashire village of Cartmel in 1816 for the Furness roadmaster William Field; however, it was not erected until 1860, after his death. The front of the stone is inscribed with the word Lancashire. On the reverse side is the inscription W.F. 1816. It is grade II listed.

In 1997, the stone was smashed into four pieces, probably as the result of a motor accident. It was restored in 1998 by stonemason Gordon Greaves of Troutbeck Bridge. The unveiling ceremony of the restored monument took place on 27 April 1998. The possible loss of the stone prompted organisations, including Friends of Real Lancashire, to raise money for its restoration. The National Trust moved the car park away from the restored stone, and placed some cobbles in the turf to mark the county boundaries radiating from it.

The stone was found fallen and damaged in summer 2017, but was once again repaired and restored to its original location.
