= Great Carrs =

Fell in the Lake District, Cumbria, England

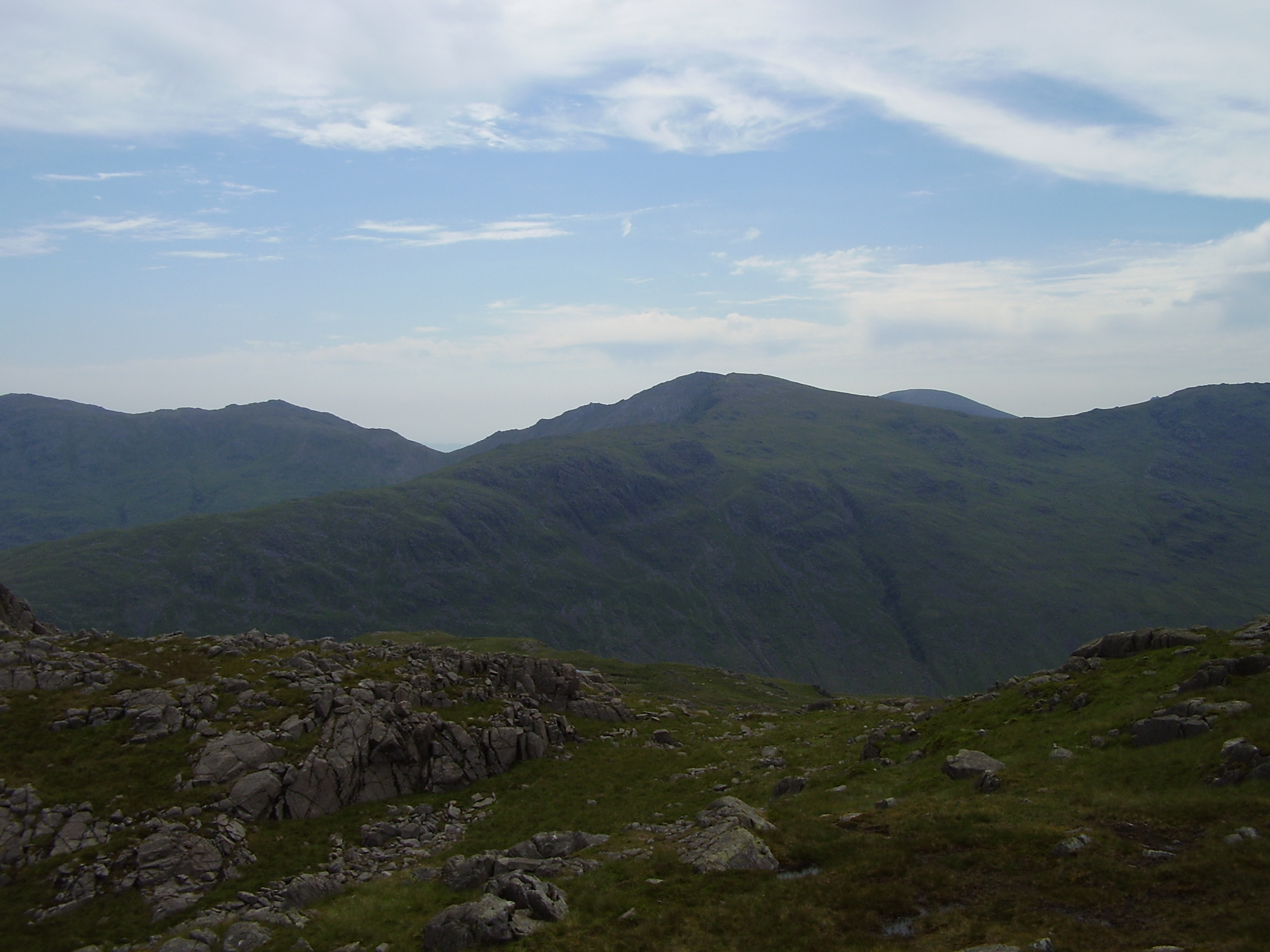
- Great Carrs (centre) from Cold Pike. Swirl How is on the left and the summit of Brim Fell is seen just to the right of Great Carrs.

Highest point
- Elevation: 788 m (2,585 ft)
- Prominence: c. 20 m
- Parent peak: Swirl How
- Listing: Wainwright, Nuttall
- Coordinates: 54°23′54″N 3°07′28″W

Geography
- Location within the Lake District
- Location: Cumbria, England
- Parent range: Lake District, Southern Fells
- OS grid: NY271009
- Topo map: OS Landranger 89,90, Explorer OL6

Great Carrs is a fell in the English Lake District. It stands above Wrynose Pass in the southern part of the District.

== Topography ==
The Coniston (or Furness) Fells form the watershed between Coniston Water and the Duddon valley to the west. The range begins at Wrynose Pass and runs south for around 10 miles (16 km) before petering out at Broughton in Furness on the Duddon Estuary. Alfred Wainwright in his influential Pictorial Guide to the Lakeland Fells took only the northern half of the range as Lakeland proper, consigning the lower fells to the south to a supplementary work The Outlying Fells of Lakeland. Great Carrs being the most northerly of the Coniston Fells therefore qualifies as one of the 214 Wainwrights. Later guidebook writers have chosen to include the whole range in their main volumes.

Swirl How stands at the geographical centre of the Coniston Fells and, according to some sources, may be the highest of the group. A long sickle shaped ridge extends from the summit of Swirl How, first north and then curving around to the east. Great Carrs is the high point of this ridge, which continues as Wet Side Edge, falling to the floor of Little Langdale. A western outlier branching off the main ridge between Great Carrs and Swirl How is Grey Friar.

Great Carrs, in common with many fells, has easy slopes to the west and crags to the east. These crags- falling directly from the summit- form the head of Greenburn. A steep sided, rather marshy valley, Greenburn is a part of the Little Langdale system, its waters joining the River Brathay at Little Langdale Tarn. Greenburn itself bears a tarn, or more correctly the remains of a reservoir. A natural waterbody was dammed in the early 18th century to provide water for the Greenburn Mine. The 250-yard (230 m) long barrage has now been breached to leave a collection of pools and bogs. The mines in question, also known as New Coniston Mine, were worked for copper from 1845 until substantially abandoned in 1865, the shafts reaching a depth of 700 ft below ground. Greenburn is bounded to the north by the curve of Wet Side Edge and to the south by Wetherlam.

Wet Side Edge has a number of intermediate tops including Little Carrs (2,270 feet, 690 m), Hell Gill Pike (2,172 feet, 662 m) and Rough Crags (1,600 feet, 490 m). To the north of the ridge is Wrynose Pass, the only connection for vehicles between Langdale and the Duddon Valley, and the route of a Roman road. Across the pass are Cold Pike and Pike of Blisco, and behind them the ground rises toward the Scafells. The top of the pass at (1,290 feet, 390 m), although facilitating access from east to west, does not sit on any obvious ridge descending from Great Carrs.

To the west of Great Carrs long slopes fall to the head of the Duddon valley as the river begins its long journey from Wrynose to the Duddon Sands. There are isolated features such as Mart Crag and the deep gully of Hell Gill, but these flanks are generally unfrequented.

== Geology ==
The Wet Side Edge Member (andesitic lapilli tuff) and Long Top Member (rhyolitic tuff) recur in faulted bands across the fell.

== Air crash ==
The ridge southward to Swirl How is named Top of Broad Slack, Broad Slack being a ferociously steep grass slope climbing out of Greenburn between the crags. This is the site of a wartime air crash and bears the sad remains of a Royal Canadian Air Force Handley Page Halifax bomber. The undercarriage, together with a wooden cross and memorial cairn is on the top of the ridge with the rest of the wreckage spread down Broad Slack. During a night time navigation exercise in 1944, the RCAF Halifax from RAF Topcliffe in North Yorkshire became lost in thick cloud while over the north west of England. In an attempt to wait out the blanket of grey, they circled in hope the cloud would clear, ultimately becoming hopelessly lost. To try to get a visual fix for the navigator, the pilot dropped the bomber out of the cloud base, with no knowledge of what was below him. Unfortunately, for both him, the crew and the aircraft, they were greeted by the great rising fells of Swirl How and Great Carrs. With no time to react, the aircraft hit the mountainside killing all on board. Despite the crew perishing in the impact, the bomber remained largely intact and, to prevent other aircraft from spotting it and reporting it repeatedly, the wreckage was cut into a number of smaller, moveable pieces and discarded down Broad Slack, where parts of it are still visible today. Over the years, two of the four Rolls-Royce engines were recovered from the crash site by an RAF helicopter, one of which is now on display at the Ruskin Museum in Coniston. In contrast to the craggy scarp of the east face, the western slope of the ridge descends over grass to the col of Fairfield, forming a tilted triangular plateau. Across Fairfield is the rocky top of Grey Friar.

== Summit ==
The summit of Great Carrs is marked by a small cairn on grass, perched above the rocky abyss of the head of Greenburn. The view to the north takes in serried ranks of fells while in other directions the Isle of Man and Pennines can be seen.

== Ascents ==
Climbs from Little Langdale via Wet Side Edge provide the most popular direct route up Great Carrs. The Edge can also be gained near the top from the summit of Wrynose Pass. Pathless ascents via Hell Gill or Broad Slack are also possible, but many other walkers will arrive on Great Carrs from Swirl How or Grey Friar.
