= Duddon Valley =

Valley in Cumbria, England

Coordinates: 54.29769°N 3.23479°W

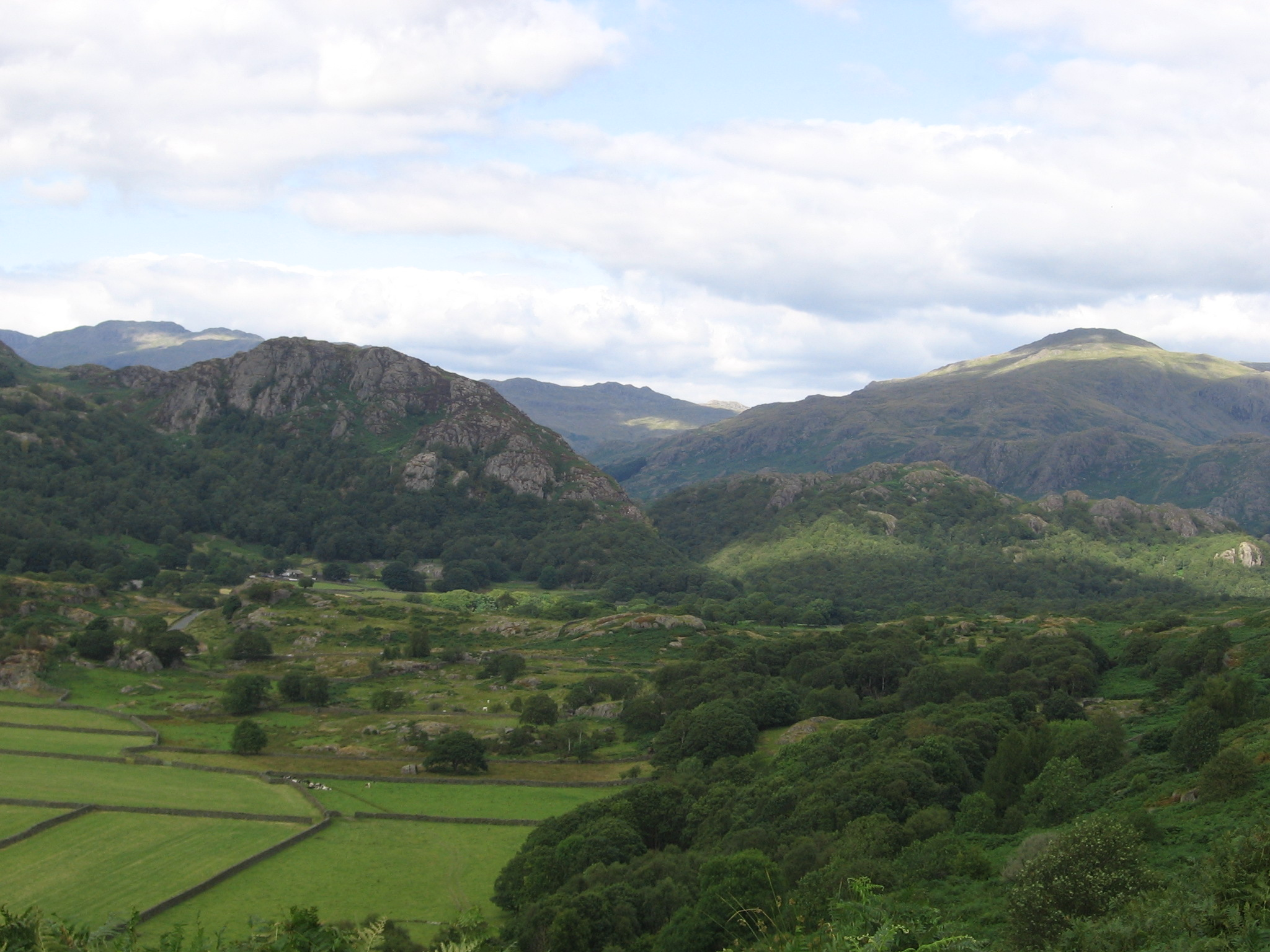
Duddon Valley looking towards Eskdale

The Duddon Valley is a valley in the southern Lake District National Park in Cumbria, England. The River Duddon flows through the valley, rising in the mountains between Eskdale and Langdale, before flowing into the Irish Sea near Broughton in Furness. In its lower reaches it is bounded by the Furness Fells and Harter Fell.

The part of the valley near the village of Ulpha is marked as "Dunnerdale" on Ordnance Survey maps, and upstream towards the village of Seathwaite is Hall Dunnerdale. The name "Dunnerdale" is often used as a synonym for "Duddon Valley", but people, including Alfred Wainwright, prefer the name "Duddon Valley". He wrote in The Southern Fells, "I ought to mention that I am aware that the Duddon Valley is also properly known as Dunnerdale, a name I haven't used in the book, preferring the former; just as I never refer to Blencathra by its better-known modern name of Saddleback. It's a matter of personal choice.".

The "Dunnerdale Fells" are between Broughton Mills and the main Duddon Valley. The civil parish of "Dunnerdale with Seathwaite" includes the valley of Dunnerdale Beck as well as the main length of the River Duddon. Advertisements for holiday cottages at Hall Dunnerdale describe the cottages as being "in the Duddon Valley".

From the top of the valley, steep motor roads lead west over the Hardknott Pass to Eskdale and east over the Wrynose Pass to the Langdale valleys. A less steep pass to Eskdale over Birker Fell leaves the valley at Ulpha, with extensive views of the Scafell range.
