= Wrynose Pass =

Mountain pass in the Lake District, Cumbria, England

Coordinates: 54.41276°N 3.11861°W

The Wrynose Pass is a mountain pass in the Lake District National Park in Cumbria, England between the Duddon Valley and Little Langdale.

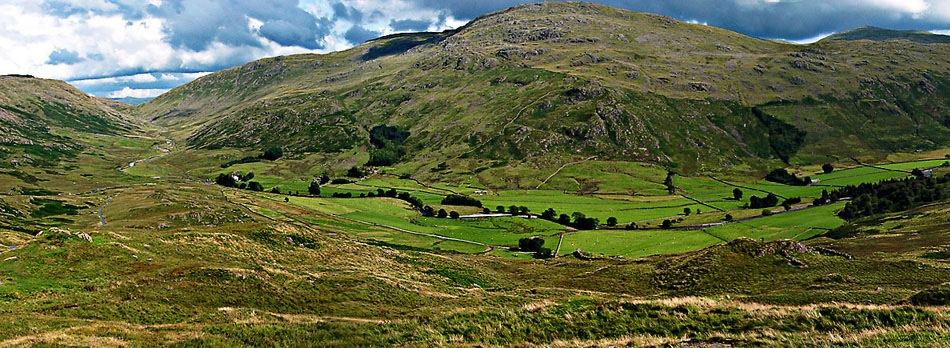
Wrynose Pass, Wrynose Bottom and the River Duddon.

== Etymology ==
The unusual name of the pass is taken from that of the adjacent Wrynose hill, also called Wrynose Fell. The name was recorded in 12th-century documents as "Wrenhalse" and in the 16th century as "Wrenosse Hill". It is thought, based on a suggestion by Eilert Ekwall, to mean "stallion's ridge", being formed on the Old Norse words (v)reini ("stallion", probably here used as a byname for an individual), and hala. It is one of a number of place names of Scandinavian origin in the area. Although most academic sources characterise "Vreini" in this context as a personal name, it has also been explained as suggesting "the horse power needed to climb it". Other suggested origins are from Old Norse ravn hals, "pass of the raven", and wreye nes, the "twisted headland". Over the years, the name has been altered to the form "Wrynose" through folk etymology, though it is still locally pronounced "Wreynuss", much like its older form.

== Road ==
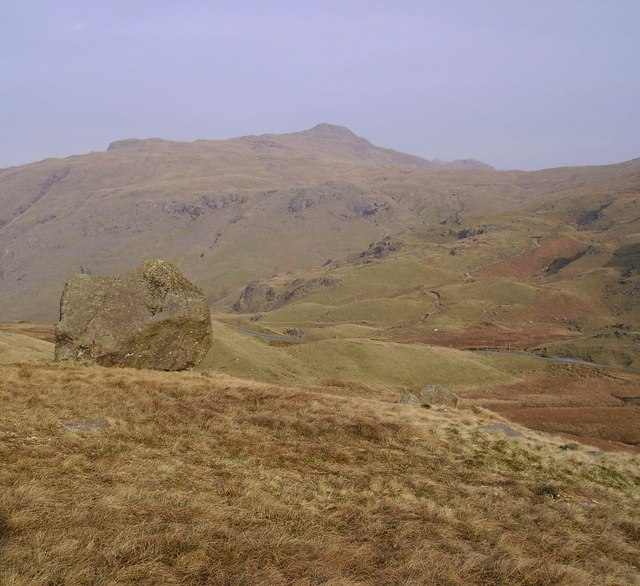
View of the road through the Wrynose Pass, with the Three Shire Stone distantly visible.

There is a single-track motor road over the pass with gradients up to 1 in 4. The pass reaches an altitude of 393m or 1,281 feet. The road drops to Wrynose Bottom, where there is a choice of heading south to Broughton-in-Furness or continuing west to Eskdale over Hardknott Pass, whose 1 in 3 gradient (about 33%) is one of the steepest roads in England. The modern road overlays a Roman road for some of the route, with the Roman track visible alongside in other stretches.

The pass separates the Furness Fells from the Bowfell-Crinkle Crags massif.

== Shire Stones ==
At the top of the Wrynose Pass is the Three Shire Stone, marking the meeting point of the historic counties of Cumberland, Lancashire and Westmorland. Prior to the early 19th century, three "county stones" existed in the same spot.

== Farm ==
At the bottom of Wrynose is Fell Foot Farm, a 17th-century, Grade II listed, National Trust property.

== See also ==
- List of hill passes of the Lake District
