= Arnison Crag =

Mountain in Cumbria, England

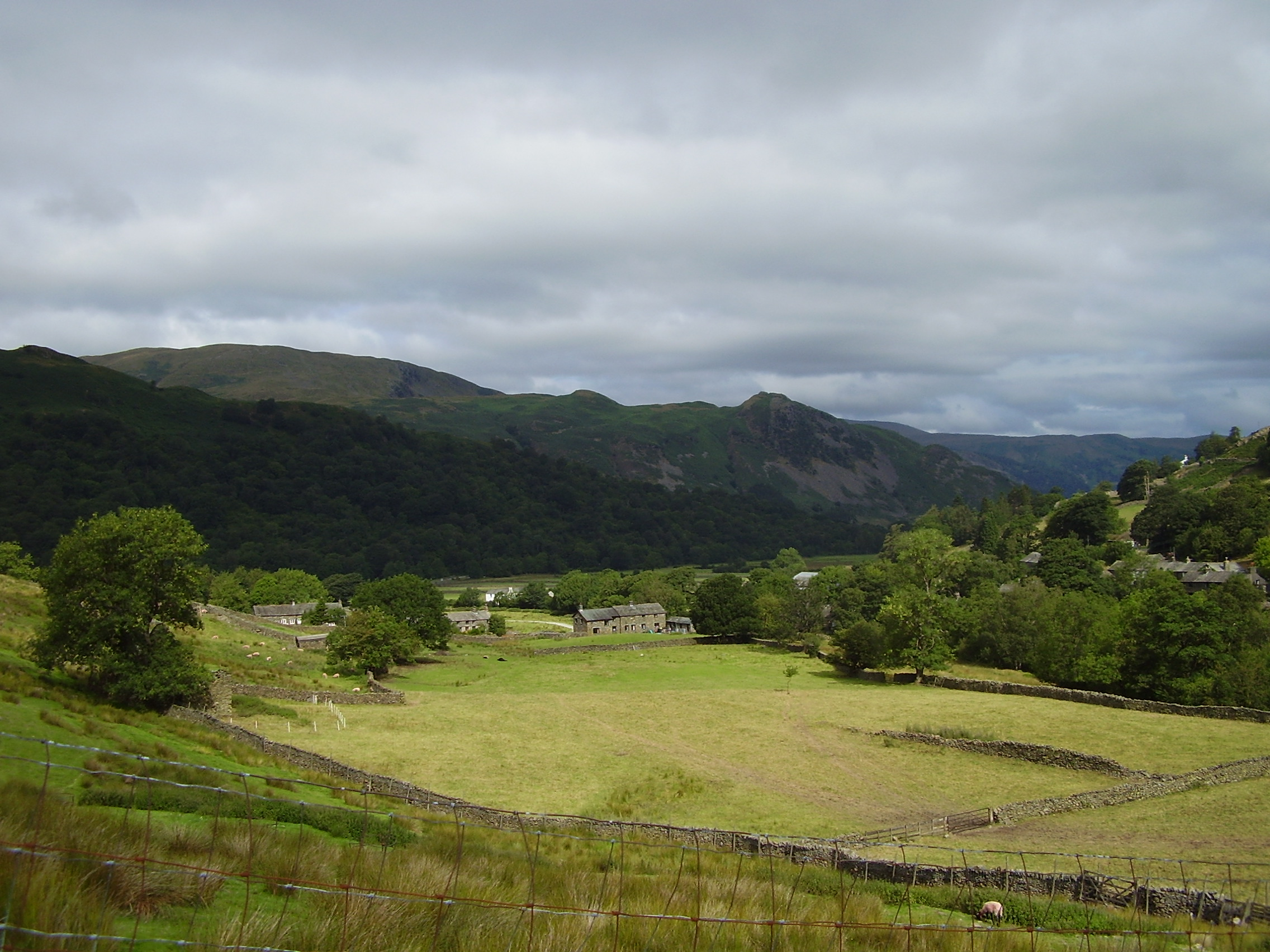
- Arnison Crag (right of centre) from Hartsop

Highest point
- Elevation: 433 m (1,421 ft)
- Prominence: c. 10 metres (33 ft)
- Parent peak: Birks
- Listing: Wainwright
- Coordinates: 54°31′36″N 2°56′22″W

Geography
- Location within the Lake District
- Location: Cumbria, England
- Parent range: Lake District, Eastern Fells
- OS grid: NY393150
- Topo map: OS Explorer OL5

Arnison Crag is a fell in the English Lake District, an outlier of the Fairfield group in the Eastern Fells. It looks down on Patterdale village and the upper reach of Ullswater.

== Topography ==
Although properly a northeastern ridge of Birks and having little topographical prominence, Arnison Crag was classed as a separate fell by Alfred Wainwright in his Pictorial Guide to the Lakeland Fells. That convention is followed here. In support of his decision he referred to it as ‘a low hill with a summit worthy of a mountain’.

Birks, which is itself a satellite of St Sunday Crag, resides on a southwest to northeast ridge. Below the summit and about halfway down the main slope, a level spur juts out eastward and then curves around to the north to run parallel with Birks. At the far end of this subsidiary ridge is the rocky summit of Arnison Crag. The slight col where the Arnison Crag ridge connects to the flank of Birks is Trough Head.

To the east of Arnison Crag is the lower portion of Deepdale and the settlement of Bridgend. This flank is rough and includes Aiken Crag and the face of Arnison Crag itself, just below the summit. To the west, separating the fell from the main ridge of Birks, is Hag Beck. This flows northward from Trough Head, passing through the woods of Glenamara Park before issuing into Grisedale Beck just above the main road. Glenamara Park was once a deer park and now contains much broadleaved woodland. Its retaining wall is still largely intact.

The ridge from Trough Head to Arnison Crag is fairly level and passes over a series of knolls. One of these- about halfway along- is the true summit, being 433 metres (1,421 ft) high. Wainwright and later guidebook writers have chosen to ignore this top because it is grassy and too far back to give an adequate view. This is one of the many reasons why Wainwrights are a subjective hill list, in contrast to the more numerically based Hewitts or Marilyns. North of the summit, the ground drops steeply over two tiers of rock outcrop, the lower one being Oxford Crag. Arnison Crag meets the valley floor directly behind Patterdale village.

== Geology ==
There is evidence of former mining activity on the Deepdale slopes of Arnison Crag. Two levels were worked for haematite just above Deepdale Hall. Geologically the summit of the fell is andesite, with the underlying Deepdale Formation of volcaniclastic sandstone revealed on the north western face.

== Summit ==
The summit is a low rock tower, attractively seen from the surrounding valleys. There is only a very small cairn due to the lack of available stone. The view is largely restricted by higher fells, but with the Fairfield and High Street fells well seen.

== Ascents ==
Ascents can be made from Patterdale village, either direct up the nose of the ridge, or by curving round to the west and following the Glenamara Park wall. Trough Head can also be reached from either Deepdale or Hag Beck, providing an approach from 'behind' the summit. Arnison Crag is often climbed as the first part of the ascent of St Sunday Crag. From here the walker can either circuit Deepdale via Fairfield, Hart Crag and Hartsop above How or swing north around Grisedale, taking in Dollywaggon Pike, Nethermost Pike and Helvellyn.
