= St Sunday Crag =

Mountain in the English Lake District

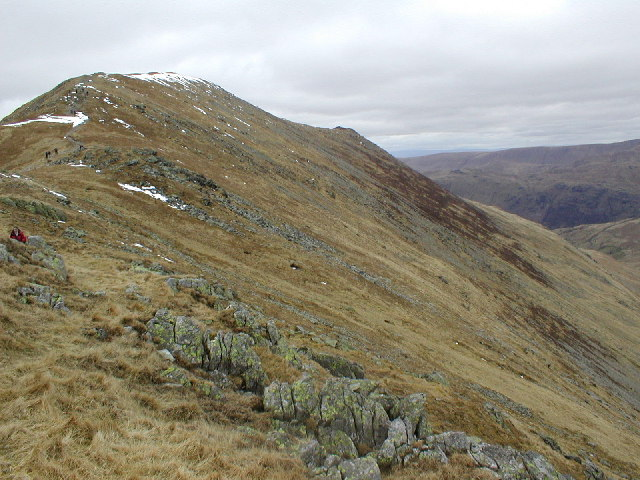

Highest point
- Elevation: 841 m (2,759 ft)
- Prominence: 166 m (545 ft)
- Parent peak: Fairfield
- Listing: Marilyn, Hewitt, Wainwright, Nuttall
- Coordinates: 54°30′46″N 2°58′34″W

Geography
- Location within the Lake District
- Location: Cumbria, England
- Parent range: Lake District, Eastern Fells
- OS grid: NY369135
- Topo map: OS Landrangers 89, 90, Explorer OL5

St Sunday Crag is a fell in the English Lake District, part of the Fairfield group in the Eastern Fells. It is a prominent feature in the Patterdale skyline, with a distinctive rounded shape. Indeed, it figures so finely in views from the upper reach of the lake that it is sometimes referred to as ‘the Ullswater Fell’.

== Topography ==
St Sunday Crag is the high point on the north-eastern ridge of Fairfield, which runs for two miles before descending to the valley floor behind Patterdale village. From the flat Fairfield summit a rough slope descends over the subsidiary top of Cofa Pike to the col at Deepdale Hause at about 680 metres (2,200 ft). This is a narrow point on the ridge, deeply scarred by pedestrian traffic. The ground now rises again to St Sunday Crag, soaring above the fells on either side. Beyond the summit there is a swift drop to the lower plateau of Birks and beyond this is the further satellite of Arnison Crag.

The top of St Sunday Crag is triangular in plan with a third ridge running off due east. This crosses a depression (The Cape) before the lower top of Gavel Pike at 784 metres (2,572 ft) is reached. From below this is a shapely pyramid worthy of the ‘pike’ designation, although its subsidiarity is all too plain from above. Below Gavel Pike is the further top of Lord's Seat before the short east ridge falls away over rough ground to Deepdale.

It is the north-western face above Grisedale that is St Sunday Crag's chief glory. The long graceful curve of the top is set above a wall of crag half a mile long, the whole face being neatly symmetrical. A series of vertical gullies slice through the crags, which together with the intervening ridges provide sport for scramblers and climbers. The crags peter out at about 550 metres (1,800 ft), to be replaced by a steep scree slope falling to the valley floor, a further 250 metres (800 ft) below. Fine views of this face can be had from Helvellyn and Birkhouse Moor across the valley.

To the south-east of the fell is the valley of Deepdale, separating St Sunday Crag from Hart Crag and Hartsop above How. This face too is steep and rough, although without sustained outcropping of rock. Between Gavel Pike and Birks is Cold Cove, a hanging valley cut off by Deepdale. All of the becks from St Sunday Crag reach the head of Ullswater at Patterdale.

View of St Sunday Crag from Fairfield, with its ridge running down from Cofa Pike on the left centre to Deepdale Hause, from which the path to the summit can be clearly seen. Helvellyn is at the top left of the picture.

== Geology ==
Geologically the summit area is andesite, overlaying the St Sunday Crag Member, a 50-metre-thick layer of rhyodactic lapilli tuff which breaks the surface on the east ridge.

== Summit ==
Given the fine ridges to either side, the summit of St Sunday Crag is surprisingly level and green. Two cairns sit upon the highest area, where rocks protrude through the turf. A further cairn at the northern end of the summit area marks the prime viewpoint for Ullswater. A quartz cross, now hard to find amid the bilberry, lies above the crags marking the top of East Chockstone Gully. The view takes much of the District, Striding Edge and the crags of Fairfield being particularly prominent. Gavel Pike provides good views of the head of Deepdale.

== Ascents ==
The main starting point for ascents is Patterdale, either by climbing or traversing Birks. Arnison Crag can also be thrown in for good measure and the north-east ridge gives fantastic rearward views of Ullswater. A further Patterdale alternative is the Elmhow zig-zag which climbs the Grisedale face just north of the crags. Lord's Seat and the east ridge can be climbed from Deepdale, starting from the car park at Bridgend. St Sunday Crag can also be ascended from the west by making first for Grisedale Tarn. This puts the summit into reach from Grasmere or Dunmail Raise.

St Sunday Crag now finds itself on Alfred Wainwright's popular Coast to Coast Walk, vastly increasing the traffic across the top.

== Name ==
Saint Sunday is a local name for Saint Dominic, though it is not certain how this saint's name became attached to the fell.
