= Mungrisdale Common =

Mountain in the Lake District, England

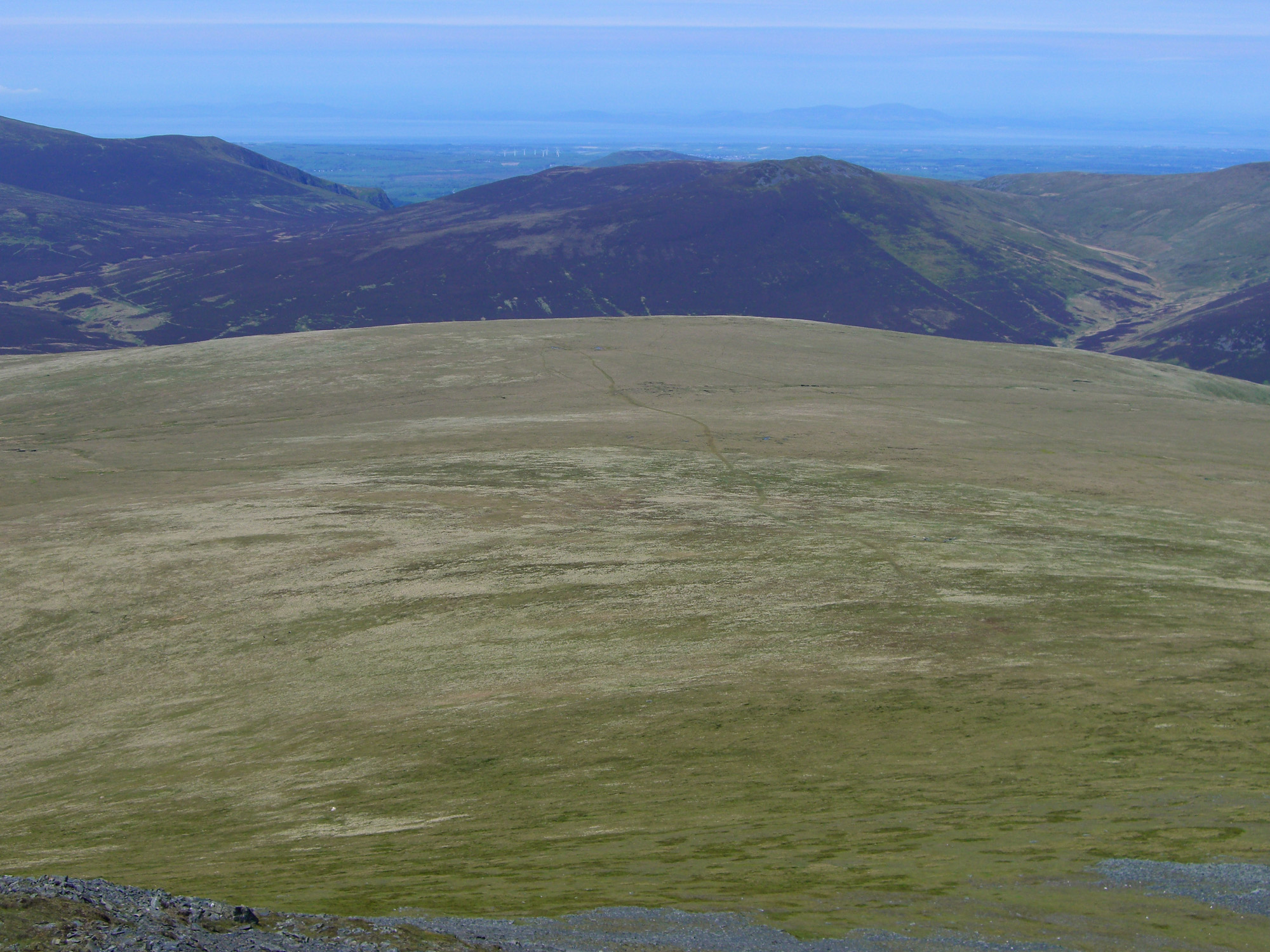
- Seen from Atkinson Pike on Blencathra, 1.5 km to the SE with Great Calva in the background.

Highest point
- Elevation: 633 m (2,077 ft)
- Prominence: c. 2 m (6 ft)
- Parent peak: Atkinson Pike
- Listing: Wainwright
- Coordinates: 54°39′12″N 3°04′13″W

Geography
- Location within the Lake District
- Location: Cumbria, England
- Parent range: Lake District, Northern Fells
- OS grid: NY312292
- Topo map: OS Landranger 90, Explorer OL4, OL5

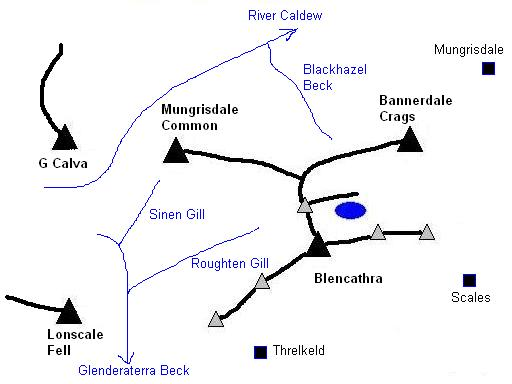
sketch map of Mungrisdale Common

Mungrisdale Common, pronounced mun-grize-dl, with emphasis on grize, is a fell in the English Lake District. Although Alfred Wainwright listed it as one of the 214 featured hills in his influential Pictorial Guide to the Lakeland Fells it was his least favourite. He commented that it "has no more pretension to elegance than a pudding that has been sat on". There is some speculation that Wainwright included the fell in his guide simply as a way to fill space, but that has never been proven. Mungrisdale Common is oddly named, as it is a number of miles from the village of Mungrisdale, which lies in a different river catchment.

== Topography ==
Mungrisdale Common lies north of Blencathra of which it is an outlier. Gently graded grassy slopes fall from Atkinson Pike, Blencathra's northern summit. Upon meeting the head of Blackhazel Beck, the shoulder divides in two, the northeastern arm connecting to Bannerdale Crags and the north western branch continuing to descend to Mungrisdale Common. Beyond an almost imperceptible depression the re-ascent is only 6 ft (2 m).

After the brief plateau of the summit the descent continues westward toward Skiddaw Forest. Confusingly, the forest contains no trees other than the windbreak of Skiddaw House, but it is a marshy upland area, at around 400 m (1,300 ft), surrounded on all sides by higher fells. Three streams flow from Skiddaw Forest, dividing the Northern Fells into three sectors. Dash Beck runs north-west, the River Caldew north east and the Glenderaterra Beck south. The three ranges of the Northern Fells are the Skiddaw massif to the southwest, the Blencathra group including Mungrisdale Common to the south east and the area colloquially known as 'Back o'Skiddaw' to the north. Skiddaw House, the lone building in the forest, has variously seen service as a shepherds' bothy and a Youth Hostel.

The Glenderaterra Beck lies to the west of Mungrisdale Common and its tributary, Roughten Gill, forms the southern boundary. A further feeder on this flank is Sinen Gill, whose waterfall is one of the fell's most notable features. The River Caldew lies to the north, across which is Great Calva, most southerly of the Back o'Skiddaw fells. Despite its uninspiring appearance Mungrisdale Common does therefore stand on the important Eden-Derwent watershed, though it is not well defined at this point. Water from the southern flanks reach the sea at Workington while rain falling on the northern side heads for the Solway Firth via Carlisle. The watershed continues across Skiddaw Forest between the headwaters of the Caldew and Glenderaterra, linking onward to Lonscale Fell in the Skiddaw range.

Mungrisdale Common carries a very small cairn at the approximate summit, constructed only after Wainwright first encouraged climbing of the fell by including it in his 1962 guidebook. Two more prominent ancient cairns also grace the fell, one to the west of the summit and the other on a tongue of ground between Sinen Gill and Roughten Gill. A small stone pillar (marked 'stake' on OS maps) stands on the watershed at the head of Glenderaterra Beck and a further prominent Cloven Stone marks its continuation higher up the slope. Both have served as boundary stones.

== Geology ==
In common with much of the Northern Fells, the Kirk Stile Formation of the Skiddaw Group predominates. It is composed of laminated mudstone and siltstone with greywacke sandstone and is of Ordovician age. Unusually however, it is overlain by considerable beds of peat in the vicinity of Mungrisdale Common.

The Glenderaterra valley was the scene of some mining activity in the 19th century. The northern workings were first named Glenderaterra Mine and later Brundholme Mine. They were driven primarily for lead but also copper ore and baryte. The returns were never economic, which led to the mine being abandoned in 1920. A little to the south was Blencathra Mine, which was worked unsuccessfully until about 1880.

== Summit ==
Wainwright's displeasure was not restricted to Mungrisdale Common's profile: he also remarked: "Any one of a thousand tufts of tough bent and cotton-grass might lay claim to crowning the highest point… A thousand tufts, yet not one can be comfortably reclined upon, this being a summit that holds indefinitely all the water that falls upon it."

The view includes a striking window to the southwest between Lonscale Fell and Blencathra, revealing unexpectedly a run of high fells from Pillar to Crinkle Crags. Elsewhere, the view is of the nearby fells surrounding Skiddaw Forest.

== Ascents ==
"For people who won't be told" Wainwright suggested ascents from Keswick or Threlkeld via the Glenderaterra valley. An alternative would be from Scales or Mungrisdale via the Glenderamackin col. Most ascents are likely to be as part of a climb of Blencathra, the intervening ground being gentle of gradient.

== Trivia ==
Apart from the sub 1,000 ft Castle Crag, Mungrisdale Common is the only Wainwright not to feature in Bill Birkett's Complete Lakeland Fells.
