= Lonscale Fell =

Mountain in the Lake District, England

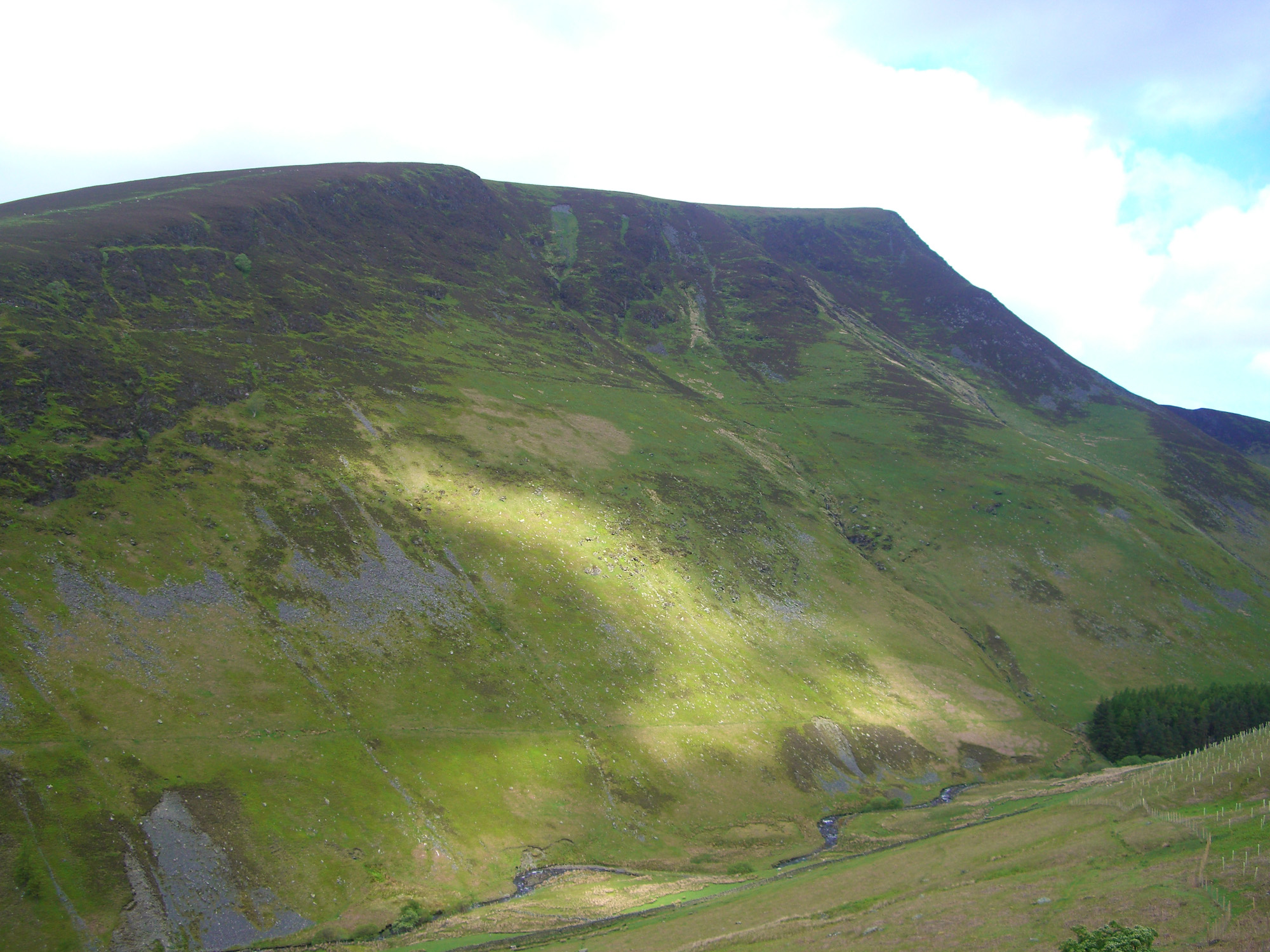
- Seen from above the Glenderaterra valley on the path from Threlkeld.

Highest point
- Elevation: 715 m (2,346 ft)
- Prominence: c. 50 m
- Parent peak: Skiddaw Little Man
- Listing: Wainwright, Hewitt, Nuttal
- Coordinates: 54°38′05″N 3°06′33″W

Geography
- Location within the Lake District
- Location: Cumbria, England
- Parent range: Lake District, Northern Fells
- OS grid: NY285272
- Topo map: OS Landranger 89, 90 OS Explorer OL4

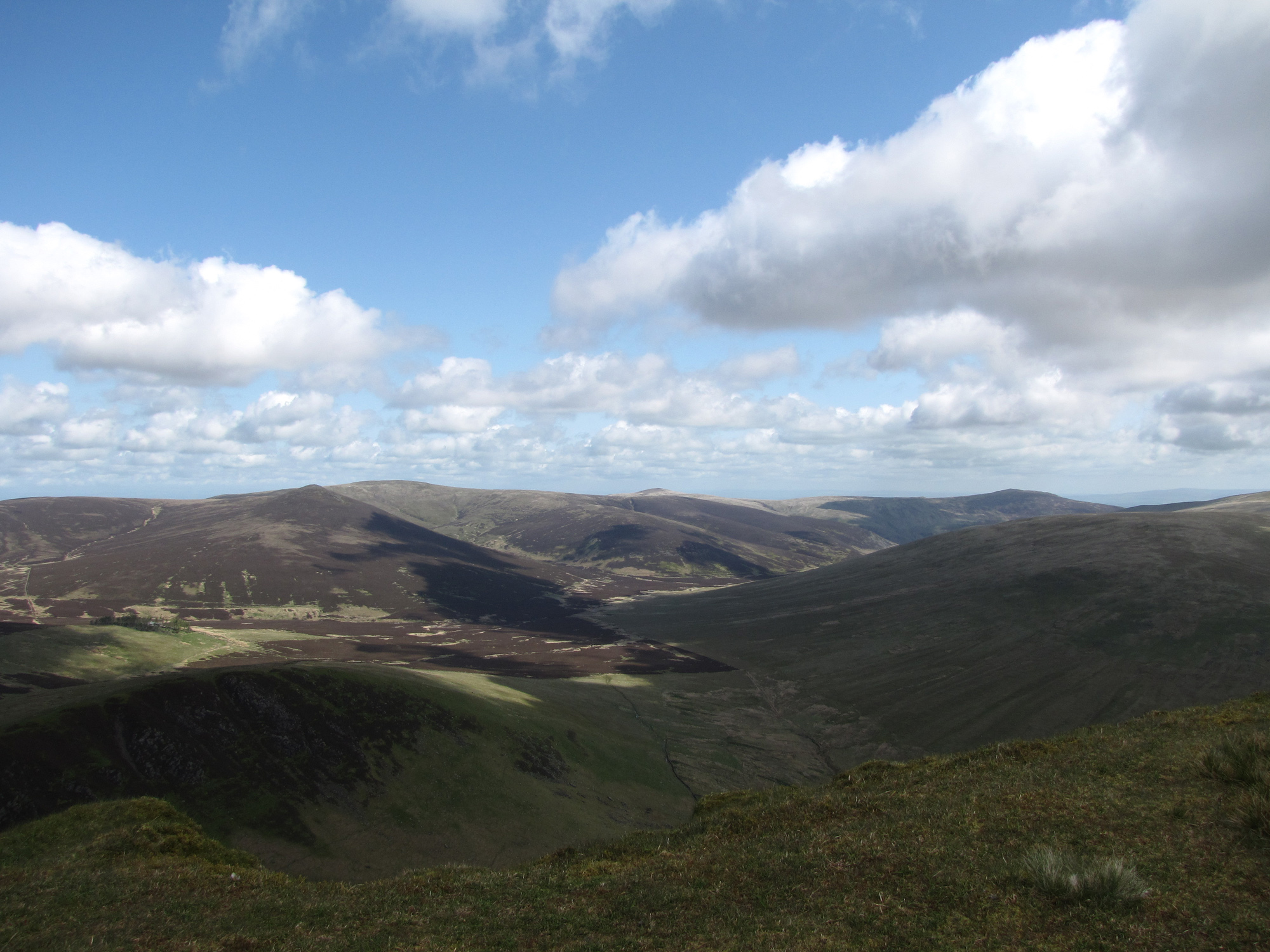
Looking north from the summit takes in the fells around the upper Caldew valley.

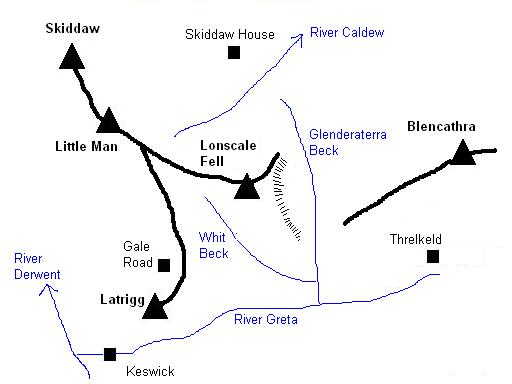
sketch map of Lonscale Fell

Lonscale Fell is a hill in the English Lake District. Its pointed second top is instantly recognisable, standing at the eastern end of the Skiddaw massif. The fell is easily climbed from Keswick or from Skiddaw House to the north. Although now primarily a sheep pasture, it once saw considerable mining activity beneath the long eastern wall of crag.

== Topography ==
The long south east ridge of Skiddaw descends over Little Man and Jenkin Hill to the depression of Flag Pots. Beyond this is the final upthrust of Lonscale Fell before the craggy descent to the Glenderaterra Beck,

The southern flanks fall gently over acres of sheep pasture in the manner of the Skiddaw range. At the base of the slope is the wooded valley of Whit Beck, separating Lonscale Fell from the east ridge of Latrigg. Here also is Lonscale, the farm which has given its name to the fell. Whit Beck is a tributary of the Glenderaterra, a stream which forms the eastern boundary of Lonscale Fell. This flows due south from Skiddaw Forest between the Skiddaw massif and Blencathra, before joining the River Greta and running on through Keswick. The eastern face of the fell above the Glenderaterra is a one-mile-long (1.6-kilometre) scarp of crags, a singular feature in the Skiddaw range.

To the north of the fell is Skiddaw Forest. Confusingly this forest contains no trees (other than the windbreak of Skiddaw House) but is a marshy upland area at around 1,300 feet (400 metres) surrounded on all sides by higher fells. Three streams flow from Skiddaw Forest, dividing the Northern Fells into three sectors. Dash Beck runs north west, the River Caldew north east and the River Glenderaterra south. The single building in Skiddaw Forest is Skiddaw House, which has variously seen service as a shepherds' bothy and a Youth Hostel.

The northern boundary of Lonscale Fell is Salehow Beck, a tributary of the River Caldew, its waters bound for the Solway Firth by way of Carlisle. Beyond the river is Great Calva, the first of the Back o'Skiddaw fells. The feeders of Salehow Beck and Whit Beck flow from the col of Flag Pots, completing the western boundary.

== Geology ==
In common with much of the Northern Fells the Kirk Stile Formation of the Skiddaw Group predominates. This is composed of laminated mudstone and siltstone with greywacke sandstone and is of Ordovician age.

The Glenderaterra valley was the scene of some mining activity in the nineteenth century. The northern workings were first named Glenderaterra Mine and later Brundholme Mine. These were driven primarily for lead, but also copper ore and baryte. The returns were never economic, the mine being abandoned in 1920. A little to the south was Blencathra Mine, worked unsuccessfully until about 1880. There are also some abandoned quarries below the eastern crags.

== Summit ==
The highest point lies on a gentle dome on the western side of the fell. The prominent peaked top visible from below lies to the east at a height of 2,306 ft (703 m). This is referred to as Lonscale Pike by some guidebooks. The watershed between the Greta to the south and the Caldew to the north actually bypasses both of these tops, following the north eastern ridge of Burnt Horse over a top at 2,295 ft (700 m) and then onward to Mungrisdale Common, an outlier of Blencathra.

The highest point bears a small cairn from which a fine Lakeland panorama is displayed southward. Thirlmere and Derwentwater are seen along with all of the major fell groupings. To the other points of the compass the northern fells intervene, close up but less inspiring.

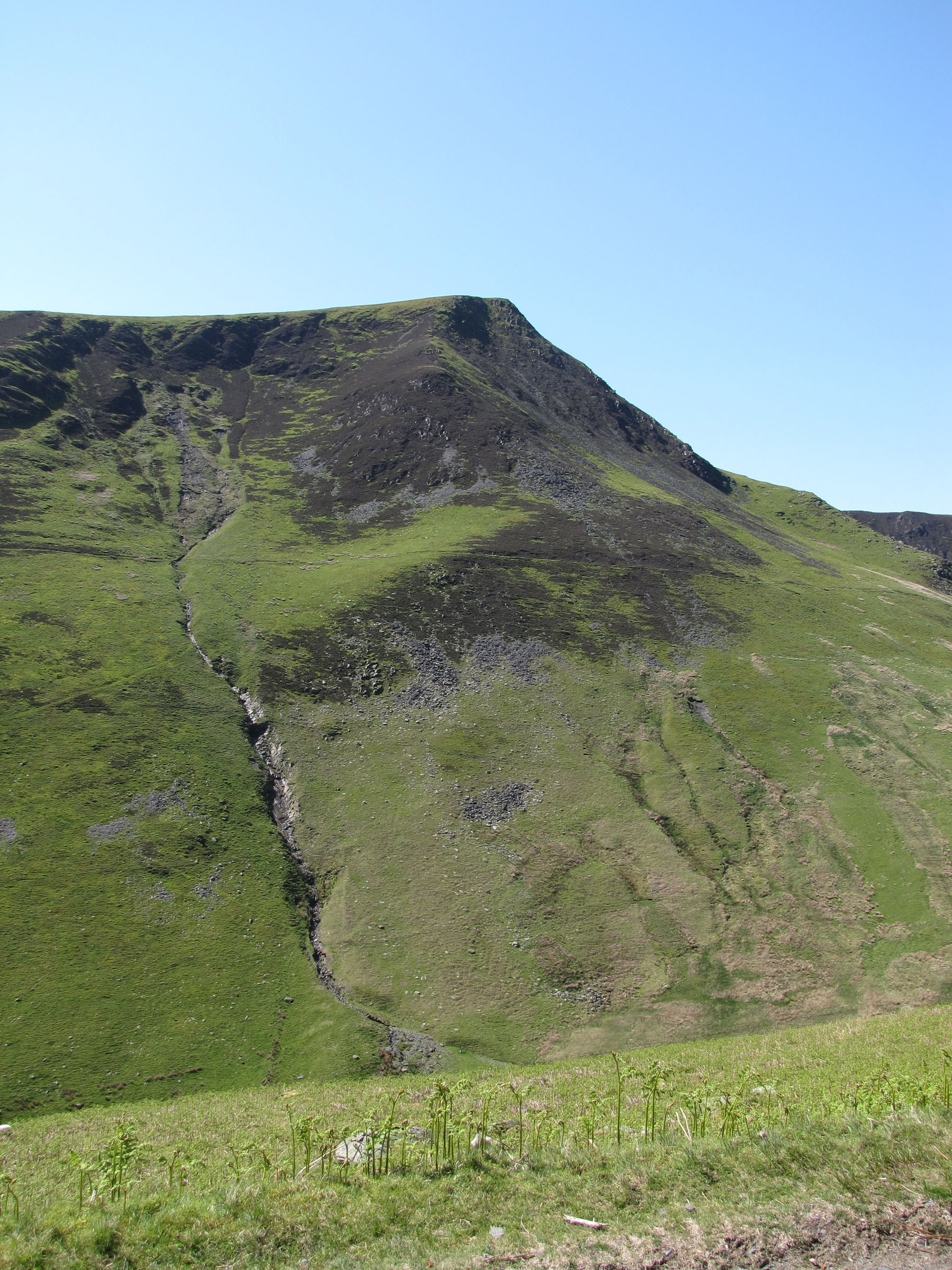
View showing the crags below the summit and the former mine workings in the Glenderaterra valley .

== Ascents ==
From Keswick, or as a labour saving alternative from the Gale Road car park behind Latrigg, a number of routes present themselves. Flag Pots can be reached from the tourist route to Skiddaw, or a direct line can be taken up the southern slopes. Another possibility is to follow the southern edge of Lonscale Crags, and the final (and longest) option is to contour right around the fell up the Glenderaterra and outflank it from behind.

From the Glenderaterra, or from Skiddaw House, the climber can make use of either the Burnt Horse Ridge, or a direct scramble up the buttress to reach Lonscale Pike.
