= Gibson Knott =

Fell in the Lake District, Cumbria, England

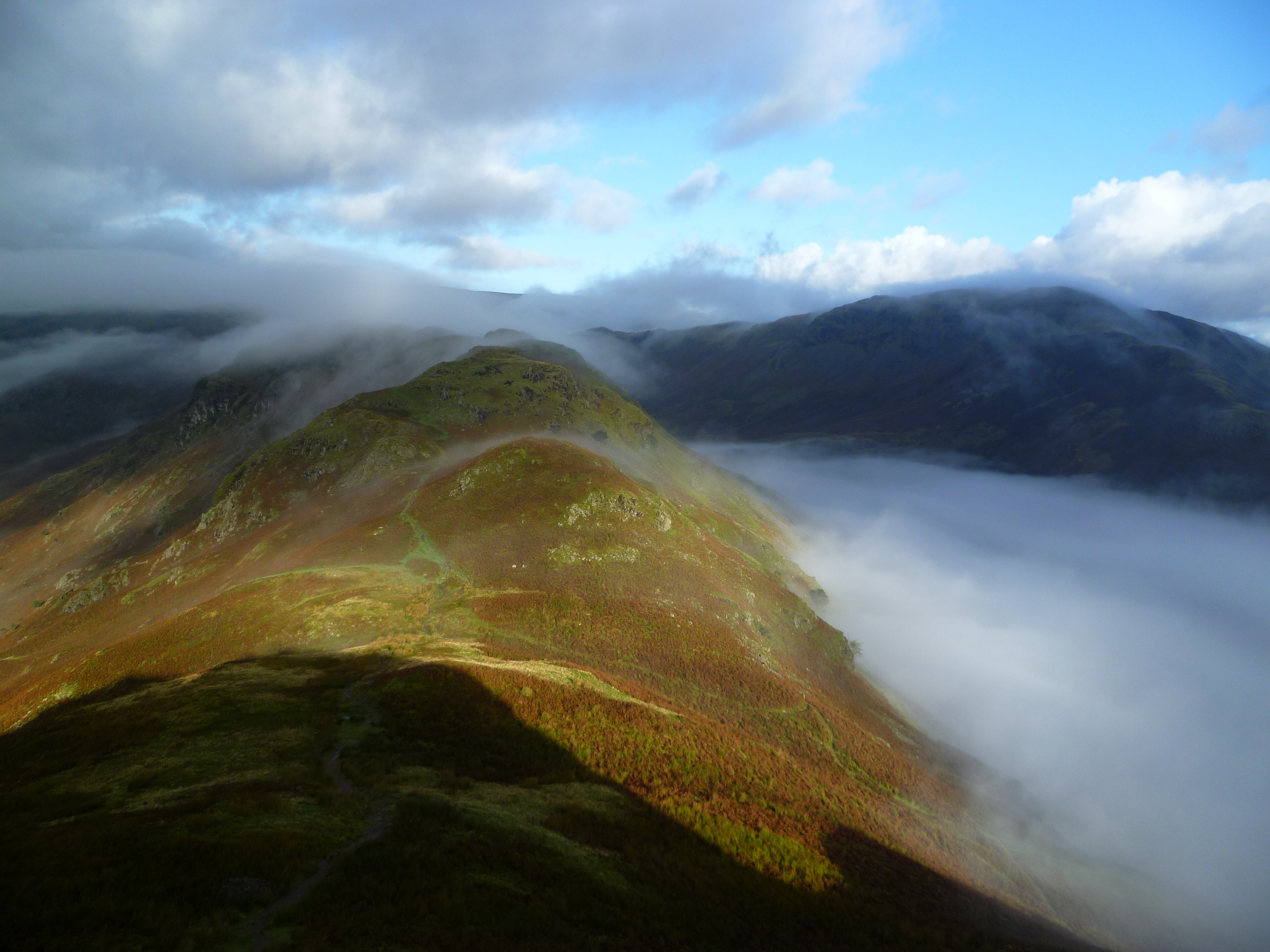

Highest point
- Elevation: 422 m (1,385 ft)
- Prominence: c. 10 m
- Parent peak: Calf Crag
- Listing: Wainwright
- Coordinates: 54°28′47″N 3°03′09″W

Geography
- Location within the Lake District
- Location: Cumbria, England
- Parent range: Lake District, Central Fells
- OS grid: NY319099
- Topo map: OS Explorer OL5, OL7

Gibson Knott is a fell in the English Lake District, an intermediate height on the ridge between Greenburn and Far Easedale in the Central Fells.

== Topography ==
The spine of the Central Fells runs on a north–south axis with the highpoint at High Raise. A complex system of daleheads to the east of this apex resolves itself into Calf Crag, a broad-topped ridge featuring a number of rocky tops. This ridge then splits into two arms about the head of Greenburn, the southern branch running on to Gibson Knott and Helm Crag.

Between Calf Crag and Helm Crag the ridge narrows to perhaps a hundred yards in width, gradually curving to the south east on its one and a half mile course. There are several tops on this section, Gibson Knott being halfway along.

The southern face above Far Easedale is rocky, Horn Crag being the principal feature. The northern side drops more gradually to the upper gathering grounds of Greenburn Bottom. There is little loss of height going westward from the summit before the climb to Calf Crag begins on a broadening ridge. Between Gibson Knott and Helm Crag lies the depression of Bracken Hause at around 1,100 ft.

== Geology ==
The summit knolls are laminated volcaniclastic claystone and siltstone of the Esk Pike Formation. The remainder of the ridge top is composed of dacitic lapilli tuff. There is no history of mining within the area of the fell.

== Summit ==
There being a couple of rocky knolls of similar height the summit point could be debated, but custom and practice has resulted in a cairn on the western outcrop. There is an all round view although perhaps not as expansive as could be expected from the centre of the District.It can be improved slightly by moving east along the ridge.

== Ascents ==
The fell is most commonly climbed as part of a circuit of Greenburn following a good path, but ascents from Grasmere via either flank of Bracken Hause are also possible.
