= List of Wainwrights =

214 Lake district peaks over 1,000 ft

Wainwrights and Wainwright Outlying Fells
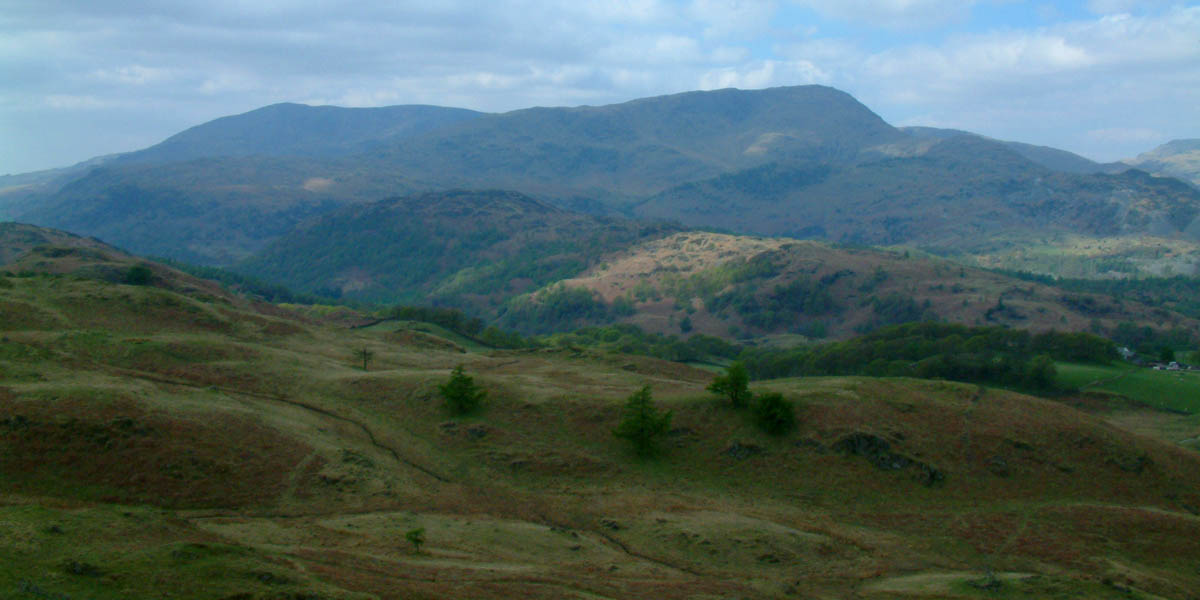
- Holme Fell in the Lake District National Park is the 2nd lowest Wainwright at 317 metres (1,040.0 ft).

Highest point
- Peak: Scafell Pike, Southern Fells
- Elevation: 3,209 ft (978.1 m)
- Prominence: 2,992 ft (912.0 m)

Geography
- Location: 214 Lake District Wainwrights; 116 Lake District Outlying Fells

Wainwrights are the 214 English peaks (known locally as fells) described in Alfred Wainwright's seven-volume Pictorial Guide to the Lakeland Fells (1955–66). They all lie within the boundary of the Lake District National Park in Cumbria, and all but one (Castle Crag) are over 1,000 feet (304.8 m) in height. (Note: There is one exception to this rule being Castle Crag, which at 951 feet (289.9 m), is Wainwright's only sub-1,000 ft summit.) Over two million copies of the Pictorial Guides have been sold since their publication. In 1974, Wainwright published a supplementary volume The Outlying Fells of Lakeland (1974), which includes another 116 summits (described in 56 walks); these are the Wainwright Outlying Fells.

Summiting all of the Wainwrights is a popular form of peak bagging in the Lake District, along with the Birketts. Because both lists are based on historical books, unlike, for example, the Munros, their constituents remain fixed, regardless of revisions to height or other metrics. There are 214 Wainwrights, of which 209 are also classed as one of the 541 Birketts. Wainwrights cover a wide range of heights, from major mountains such as the highest Wainwright, Scafell Pike at 978 metres (3,209 ft), to Castle Crag, the smallest Wainwright at 290 metres (951 ft). Wainwright did not state any rules about what should be included in his guides, choosing instead to note his walks according to his favour and their relevance in the landscape, never himself considering the summiting of all of them to be an important accomplishment for others.

The Long Distance Walkers Association (LDWA) holds a register of walkers who wish it to be recorded that they have completed the Wainwrights. The first recorded continuous round of all 214 Wainwrights was completed by Alan Heaton between 29 June and 8 July 1985, starting and finishing at Keswick Moot Hall, with a total time of 9 days and 16 hours. Joss Naylor completed the round in 7 days in 1986 and held the record until 20 June 2014 when Steve Birkinshaw completed the round in 6 days and 13 hours, involving 320 miles (515 km) and 118,000 ft (36,000m) of ascent. Birkinshaw published an account of his run as There is No Map in Hell: The Record-Breaking Run Across the Lake District Fells (2017, Vertebrate Publishing: ISBN 978-1910240946). Birkinshaw's record was broken on 20 June 2019 when Paul Tierney completed the round in 6 days 6 hours 4 minutes. On 12 to 17 June 2021, Sabrina Verjee set a new record of 5 days, 23 hours and 49 minutes. The current record was set by John Kelly on 2 to 7 May 2022 with a time of 5 days, 12 hours and 14 minutes.

== Wainwrights by height ==
This list is from the Database of British and Irish Hills (DoBIH) in October 2018, and are peaks the DoBIH marks as being Wainwrights ("W"). (Note: The Database of British and Irish Hills (DoBIH) is the most referenced database for the classification of peaks in the British Isles, and the DoBIH is licensed under a "Creative Commons Attribution 3.0 Unported License".) DoBIH also updates the measurements as surveys are recorded, so these tables should not be amended unless the entire DoBIH data is re-downloaded; these measurements may differ slightly from the "By Book" section, which are from older sources.

Wainwrights, ranked by height (DoBIH, October 2018)
Height rank	Name	Section	Height (m)	Prom. (m)	Height (ft)	Prom. (ft)	Topo map	OS Grid reference	Classification (§ DoBIH codes)
1	Scafell Pike	34B: LD C&W	978	912	3,209	2,992	89 90	NY215072	Ma,F,Sim,Hew,N,W,B,Sy,Fel,CoH,CoU,CoA
2	Scafell	34B: LD C&W	964	132	3,162	434	89 90	NY206064	Hu,F,Sim,Hew,N,W,B,Sy,Fel
3	Helvellyn	34C: LD E	950	712	3,117	2,336	90	NY342151	Ma,F,Sim,Hew,N,W,B,Sy,Fel,CoH
4	Skiddaw	34A: LD N	931	709	3,054	2,326	89 90	NY260290	Ma,F,Sim,Hew,N,W,B,Sy,Fel
5	Great End	34B: LD C&W	910	56	2,984	184	89 90	NY226083	Sim,Hew,N,W,B,Sy,Fel
6	Bowfell	34B: LD C&W	903	148	2,962	486	89 90	NY244064	Hu,Sim,Hew,N,sMa,W,B,Sy,Fel
7	Great Gable	34B: LD C&W	899	425	2,949	1,394	89 90	NY211103	Ma,Sim,Hew,N,W,B,Sy,Fel
8	Pillar	34B: LD C&W	892	348	2,927	1,142	89 90	NY171121	Ma,Sim,Hew,N,W,B,Sy,Fel
9	Nethermost Pike	34C: LD E	891	29	2,923	95	90	NY343142	N,sSim,W,B,Sy,Fel
10	Catstye Cam	34C: LD E	890	63	2,920	207	90	NY348158	Sim,Hew,N,W,B,Sy,Fel
11	Esk Pike	34B: LD C&W	885	112	2,904	367	89 90	NY236075	Hu,Sim,Hew,N,W,B,Sy,Fel
12	Raise	34C: LD E	883	91	2,897	299	90	NY342174	Sim,Hew,N,sHu,W,B,Sy,Fel
13	Fairfield	34C: LD E	873	299	2,864	981	90	NY358117	Ma,Sim,Hew,N,W,B,Sy,Fel
14	Blencathra (Hallsfell Top)	34A: LD N	868	461	2,848	1,512	90	NY323277	Ma,Sim,Hew,N,W,B,Sy,Fel
15	Skiddaw Little Man	34A: LD N	865	61	2,838	200	89 90	NY266277	Sim,Hew,N,W,B,Sy,Fel
16	White Side	34C: LD E	863	42	2,831	138	90	NY337166	Sim,Hew,N,W,B,Sy,Fel
17	Crinkle Crags (Long Top)	34B: LD C&W	859	139	2,818	456	89 90	NY248048	Hu,Sim,Hew,N,W,B,Sy,Fel
18	Dollywaggon Pike	34C: LD E	858	50	2,815	164	90	NY346130	Sim,Hew,N,W,B,Sy,Fel
19	Great Dodd	34C: LD E	857	109	2,812	358	90	NY342205	Hu,Sim,Hew,N,W,B,Sy,Fel
20	Grasmoor	34B: LD C&W	852	519	2,795	1,703	89 90	NY174203	Ma,Sim,Hew,N,W,B,Sy,Fel
21	Stybarrow Dodd	34C: LD E	843	68	2,766	223	90	NY343189	Sim,Hew,N,W,B,Sy,Fel
22	Scoat Fell	34B: LD C&W	841	86	2,759	282	89	NY159113	Sim,Hew,N,W,B,Sy,Fel
23	St Sunday Crag	34C: LD E	841	159	2,759	522	90	NY369133	Ma,Sim,Hew,N,W,B,Sy,Fel
24	Crag Hill [Eel Crag]	34B: LD C&W	839	117	2,753	384	89 90	NY192203	Hu,Sim,Hew,N,W,B,Sy,Fel
25	High Street	34C: LD E	828	373	2,717	1,224	90	NY440110	Ma,Sim,Hew,N,W,B,Sy,Fel
26	Red Pike (Wasdale)	34B: LD C&W	826	62	2,710	203	89	NY165106	Sim,Hew,N,W,B,Sy,Fel
27	Hart Crag	34C: LD E	822	48	2,697	157	90	NY369112	Sim,Hew,N,W,B,Sy,Fel
28	Steeple	34B: LD C&W	819	24	2,687	79	89	NY157116	N,sSim,W,B,Sy,Fel
29	Lingmell	34B: LD C&W	807	72	2,648	236	89 90	NY209081	Sim,Hew,N,W,B,Sy,Fel
30	High Stile	34B: LD C&W	806	362	2,644	1,188	89	NY167147	W,B
31	The Old Man of Coniston	34D: LD S	802	415	2,633	1,362	96 97	SD272978	Ma,Sim,Hew,N,W,B,Sy,Fel,CoH
32	Swirl How	34D: LD S	802	120	2,633	394	89 90	NY272005	Hu,Sim,Hew,N,W,B,Sy,Fel
33	Kirk Fell	34B: LD C&W	802	181	2,631	594	89 90	NY194104	Ma,Sim,Hew,N,W,B,Sy,Fel
34	High Raise (High Street)	34C: LD E	802	88	2,631	289	90	NY448134	Sim,Hew,N,W,B,Sy,Fel
35	Green Gable	34B: LD C&W	801	50	2,628	164	89 90	NY214107	Sim,Hew,N,W,B,Sy,Fel
36	Haycock	34B: LD C&W	797	94	2,615	308	89	NY144107	Sim,Hew,N,sHu,W,B,Sy,Fel
37	Brim Fell	34D: LD S	796	21	2,612	69	96 97	SD270985	N,sSim,W,B,Sy,Fel
38	Rampsgill Head	34C: LD E	792	41	2,598	135	90	NY443128	Sim,Hew,N,W,B,Sy,Fel
39	Dove Crag	34C: LD E	792	50	2,598	164	90	NY374104	Sim,Hew,N,W,B,Sy,Fel
40	Grisedale Pike	34B: LD C&W	791	189	2,595	620	89 90	NY198225	Ma,Sim,Hew,N,W,B,Sy,Fel
41	Watson's Dodd	34C: LD E	789	11	2,589	36	90	NY335195	W,B,Sy,Fel
42	Allen Crags	34B: LD C&W	785	60	2,575	197	89 90	NY236085	Sim,Hew,N,W,B,Sy,Fel
43	Great Carrs	34D: LD S	785	20	2,575	66	89 90	NY270009	N,sSim,W,B,Sy,Fel
44	Thornthwaite Crag	34C: LD E	784	31	2,572	102	90	NY431100	Sim,Hew,N,W,B,Sy,Fel
45	Glaramara	34B: LD C&W	783	121	2,569	397	89 90	NY245104	Hu,Sim,Hew,N,W,B,Sy,Fel
46	Kidsty Pike	34C: LD E	780	15	2,559	49	90	NY447125	N,W,B,Sy,Fel
47	Harter Fell (Mardale)	34C: LD E	779	149	2,556	490	90	NY459093	Hu,Sim,Hew,N,sMa,W,B,Sy,Fel
48	Dow Crag	34D: LD S	778	129	2,552	423	96 97	SD262977	Hu,Sim,Hew,N,W,B,Sy,Fel
49	Red Screes	34C: LD E	776	260	2,546	853	90	NY396087	Ma,Sim,Hew,N,W,B,Sy,Fel
50	Sail	34B: LD C&W	773	32	2,536	105	89 90	NY198202	Sim,Hew,N,W,B,Sy,Fel
51	Grey Friar	34D: LD S	773	78	2,536	256	89 90	NY260003	Sim,Hew,N,W,B,Sy,Fel
52	Wandope	34B: LD C&W	772	30	2,533	98	89 90	NY188197	Sim,Hew,N,W,B,Sy,Fel
53	Hopegill Head	34B: LD C&W	770	97	2,526	318	89 90	NY185221	Sim,Hew,N,sHu,W,B,Sy,Fel
54	Great Rigg	34C: LD E	766	31	2,513	102	90	NY355104	Sim,Hew,N,W,B,Sy,Fel
55	Stony Cove Pike	34C: LD E	763	171	2,503	561	90	NY417100	Ma,Sim,Hew,N,W,B,Sy,Fel
56	Wetherlam	34D: LD S	763	145	2,503	476	89 90	NY288011	Hu,Sim,Hew,N,sMa,W,B,Sy,Fel
57	High Raise [Langdale]	34B: LD C&W	762	283	2,500	928	89 90	NY280095	Ma,Sim,Hew,N,W,B,Sy,Fel
58	Slight Side	34B: LD C&W	762	14	2,500	46	89 90	NY209050	W,B,Sy,Fel,xN
59	Mardale Ill Bell	34C: LD E	760	10	2,493	33	90	NY447101	W,B,Sy,Fel,xN
60	Ill Bell	34C: LD E	757	124	2,484	407	90	NY436077	Hu,Sim,Hew,N,W,B,Sy,Fel
61	Hart Side	34C: LD E	756	23	2,480	75	90	NY359197	N,sSim,W,B,Sy,Fel
62	Red Pike (Buttermere)	34B: LD C&W	755	40	2,477	131	89	NY160154	Sim,Hew,N,W,B,Sy,Fel
63	Dale Head	34B: LD C&W	753	397	2,470	1,302	89 90	NY222153	Ma,Sim,Hew,N,W,B,Sy,Fel
64	Carl Side	34A: LD N	746	30	2,448	98	89 90	NY254280	Sim,Hew,N,W,B,Sy,Fel
65	High Crag (Buttermere)	34B: LD C&W	744	35	2,441	115	89 90	NY180139	Sim,Hew,N,W,B,Sy,Fel
66	The Knott (High Street)	34C: LD E	739	13	2,425	43	90	NY437126	W,B,Sy,xN
67	Robinson	34B: LD C&W	737	161	2,418	528	89 90	NY201168	Ma,Sim,Hew,N,W,B,Sy,Fel
68	Seat Sandal	34C: LD E	737	152	2,417	498	90	NY344115	Ma,Sim,Hew,N,W,B,Sy,Fel
69	Harrison Stickle	34B: LD C&W	736	53	2,415	174	89 90	NY281074	Sim,Hew,N,W,B,Sy,Fel
70	Sergeant Man	34B: LD C&W	736	12	2,415	39	89 90	NY286088	W,B,Sy,Fel,xN
71	Long Side	34A: LD N	734	40	2,408	131	89 90	NY248284	Sim,Hew,N,W,B,Sy,Fel
72	Kentmere Pike	34C: LD E	730	39	2,395	128	90	NY465077	Sim,Hew,N,W,B,Sy,Fel
73	Hindscarth	34B: LD C&W	727	71	2,385	233	89 90	NY215165	Sim,Hew,N,W,B,Sy,Fel
74	Ullscarf	34B: LD C&W	726	118	2,382	387	89 90	NY291121	Hu,Sim,Hew,N,W,B,Sy,Fel
75	Clough Head	34C: LD E	726	108	2,382	354	90	NY333225	Hu,Sim,Hew,N,W,B,Sy,Fel
76	Thunacar Knott	34B: LD C&W	723	27	2,372	89	89 90	NY279079	N,sSim,W,B,Sy,Fel
77	Froswick	34C: LD E	720	75	2,362	246	90	NY435085	Sim,Hew,N,W,B,Sy,Fel
78	Birkhouse Moor	34C: LD E	718	21	2,356	69	90	NY363159	N,sSim,W,B,Sy,Fel
79	Lonscale Fell	34A: LD N	715	50	2,346	164	89 90	NY285271	Sim,Hew,N,W,B,Sy,Fel
80	Brandreth	34B: LD C&W	715	61	2,346	200	89 90	NY214119	Sim,Hew,N,W,B,Sy,Fel
81	Branstree	34C: LD E	713	137	2,339	449	90	NY478099	Hu,Sim,Hew,N,W,B,Sy,Fel
82	Knott	34A: LD N	710	242	2,329	794	89 90	NY296329	Ma,Sim,Hew,N,W,B,Sy,Fel
83	Pike of Stickle	34B: LD C&W	709	54	2,326	177	89 90	NY273073	Sim,Hew,N,W,B,Sy,Fel
84	Whiteside [West Top]	34B: LD C&W	707	18	2,320	59	89 90	NY170219	N,W,B,Sy,Fel
85	Yoke	34C: LD E	706	38	2,316	125	90	NY437067	Sim,Hew,N,W,B,Sy,Fel
86	Pike of Blisco	34B: LD C&W	705	177	2,313	581	89 90	NY271042	Ma,Sim,Hew,N,W,B,Sy,Fel
87	Bowscale Fell	34A: LD N	702	87	2,303	285	90	NY333305	Sim,Hew,N,W,B,Sy,Fel
88	Cold Pike	34B: LD C&W	701	46	2,300	151	89 90	NY262036	Sim,Hew,N,W,B,Sy,Fel
89	Pavey Ark	34B: LD C&W	700	15	2,297	49	89 90	NY284079	N,W,B,Sy,Fel
90	Gray Crag	34C: LD E	699	16	2,293	52	90	NY427117	N,W,B,Sy,Fel
91	Grey Knotts	34B: LD C&W	697	16	2,287	52	89 90	NY217125	N,W,B,Sy,Fel
92	Caw Fell	34B: LD C&W	697	22	2,287	72	89	NY132109	N,sSim,W,B,Sy,Fel
93	Rest Dodd	34C: LD E	696	111	2,283	364	90	NY432136	Hu,Sim,Hew,N,W,B,Sy,Fel
94	Seatallan	34B: LD C&W	692	193	2,270	633	89	NY140084	Ma,Sim,Hew,N,W,B,Sy,Fel
95	Ullock Pike	34A: LD N	690	14	2,264	46	89 90	NY244287	W,B,Sy,Fel,xN
96	Great Calva	34A: LD N	690	142	2,264	466	89 90	NY290311	Hu,Sim,Hew,N,sMa,W,B,Sy,Fel
97	Bannerdale Crags	34A: LD N	683	37	2,241	121	90	NY335290	Sim,Hew,N,W,B,Sy,Fel
98	Loft Crag	34B: LD C&W	680	22	2,231	72	89 90	NY277071	N,sSim,W,B,Sy,Fel
99	Sheffield Pike	34C: LD E	675	91	2,215	299	90	NY369181	Sim,Hew,N,sHu,W,B,Sy,Fel
100	Bakestall	34A: LD N	673	7	2,208	23	89 90	NY266308	W,B,Sy,Fel
101	Scar Crags	34B: LD C&W	672	55	2,205	180	89 90	NY208206	Sim,Hew,N,W,B,Sy,Fel
102	Loadpot Hill	34C: LD E	672	49	2,205	161	90	NY456180	Sim,Hew,N,W,B,Sy,Fel
103	Wether Hill	34C: LD E	671	5	2,201	16	90	NY455167	W,B,Sy,Fel,xN
104	Tarn Crag (Sleddale)	34C: LD E	664	160	2,178	525	90	NY488078	Ma,Sim,Hew,N,W,B,Sy,Fel
105	Carrock Fell	34A: LD N	663	91	2,175	299	90	NY341336	Sim,Hew,N,sHu,W,B,Sy,Fel
106	Whiteless Pike	34B: LD C&W	660	36	2,165	118	89 90	NY180189	Sim,Hew,N,W,B,Sy,Fel
107	High Pike (Caldbeck)	34A: LD N	658	69	2,159	226	90	NY318350	Sim,Hew,N,W,B,Sy,Fel
108	Place Fell	34C: LD E	657	262	2,156	860	90	NY405169	Ma,Sim,Hew,N,W,B,Sy,Fel
109	High Pike (Scandale)	34C: LD E	656	6	2,152	20	90	NY374088	W,B,Sy,Fel
110	Selside Pike	34C: LD E	655	36	2,149	118	90	NY490111	Sim,Hew,N,W,B,Sy,Fel
111	Middle Dodd	34C: LD E	654	14	2,146	46	90	NY397095	W,B,Sy,Fel
112	Harter Fell (Eskdale)	34D: LD S	654	276	2,146	906	96	SD218997	Ma,Sim,Hew,N,W,B,Sy,Fel
113	High Spy	34B: LD C&W	653	148	2,143	485	89 90	NY234162	Hu,Sim,Hew,N,sMa,W,B,Sy,Fel
114	Great Sca Fell	34A: LD N	651	13	2,136	43	89 90	NY291339	W,B,Sy,Fel,xN
115	Rossett Pike	34B: LD C&W	651	40	2,136	131	89 90	NY249075	Sim,Hew,N,W,B,Sy,Fel
116	Fleetwith Pike	34B: LD C&W	649	118	2,129	388	89 90	NY205141	Hu,Sim,Hew,N,W,B,Sy,Fel
117	Base Brown	34B: LD C&W	646	38	2,119	125	89 90	NY225114	Sim,Hew,N,W,B,Sy,Fel
118	Grey Crag [Sleddale]	34C: LD E	638	41	2,093	135	90	NY497072	Sim,Hew,N,W,B,Sy,Fel
119	Causey Pike	34B: LD C&W	637	40	2,090	131	89 90	NY218208	Sim,Hew,N,W,B,Sy,Fel
120	Little Hart Crag W	34C: LD E	637	34	2,090	112	90	NY387100	Sim,Hew,N,W,B,Sy,Fel
121	Starling Dodd	34B: LD C&W	633	73	2,077	240	89	NY142157	Sim,Hew,N,W,B,Sy,Fel
122	Mungrisdale Common	34A: LD N	633	2	2,077	8	90	NY310292	W,Sy
123	Yewbarrow	34B: LD C&W	627	142	2,057	466	89 90	NY173084	Hu,Sim,Hew,N,sMa,W,B,Sy,Fel
124	Birks	34C: LD E	622	20	2,041	66	90	NY380143	N,sSim,W,B,Sy,Fel
125	Hartsop Dodd	34C: LD E	618	24	2,028	79	90	NY411118	N,sSim,W,B,Sy,Fel
126	Great Borne	34B: LD C&W	616	113	2,021	371	89	NY123163	Hu,Sim,Hew,N,W,B,Sy,Fel
127	Heron Pike	34C: LD E	612	21	2,008	69	90	NY355083	N,sSim,W,B,Sy
128	Illgill Head	34B: LD C&W	609	314	1,998	1,030	89	NY168049	Ma,Sim,Dew,W,B,Sy,Fel
129	High Seat	34B: LD C&W	608	136	1,995	446	89 90	NY287180	Hu,Sim,Dew,W,B,Sy,Fel
130	Seathwaite Fell	34B: LD C&W	601	12	1,972	39	89 90	NY229101	W,B,Sy,Fel
131	Haystacks (Buttermere)	34B: LD C&W	597	78	1,959	256	89 90	NY193131	5,Dew,W,B,Sy,Fel
132	Bleaberry Fell	34B: LD C&W	590	42	1,936	138	89 90	NY285195	5,Dew,W,B,Sy,Fel
133	Shipman Knotts	34C: LD E	587	11	1,926	36	90	NY472062	W,B,Sy,Fel
134	Brae Fell	34A: LD N	586	14	1,923	46	89 90	NY288351	W,B,Sy,Fel
135	Middle Fell	34B: LD C&W	582	117	1,909	384	89	NY150072	Hu,5,Dew,W,B,Sy,Fel
136	Ard Crags	34B: LD C&W	581	116	1,906	381	89 90	NY206197	Hu,5,Dew,W,B,Sy,Fel
137	Hartsop Above How	34C: LD E	581	27	1,906	89	90	NY383120	s5,W,B,Sy,Fel
138	The Nab	34C: LD E	576	61	1,890	200	90	NY434151	5,Dew,W,B,Sy
139	Maiden Moor	34B: LD C&W	575	10	1,886	33	89 90	NY236181	W,B,Sy,Fel
140	Blake Fell	34B: LD C&W	573	164	1,880	538	89	NY110196	Ma,5,Dew,W,B,Sy,Fel
141	Sergeant's Crag	34B: LD C&W	571	45	1,873	148	89 90	NY273113	5,Dew,W,B,Sy,Fel
142	Outerside	34B: LD C&W	568	74	1,864	243	89 90	NY211214	5,Dew,W,B,Sy,Fel
143	Angletarn Pikes N	34C: LD E	567	78	1,860	256	90	NY413148	5,Dew,W,B,Sy,Fel
144	Brock Crags	34C: LD E	561	24	1,841	79	90	NY416136	s5,W,B,Sy,Fel
145	Knott Rigg	34B: LD C&W	556	53	1,824	174	89 90	NY197188	5,Dew,W,B,Sy,Fel
146	Steel Fell [Dead Pike]	34B: LD C&W	553	80	1,814	262	90	NY319111	5,Dew,W,B,Sy,Fel
147	Lord's Seat	34A: LD N	552	237	1,811	778	89 90	NY204265	Ma,5,Dew,W,B,Sy,Fel
148	Rosthwaite Fell	34B: LD C&W	551	45	1,808	148	89 90	NY258124	5,Dew,W,B,Sy,Fel
149	Meal Fell	34A: LD N	550	30	1,804	98	89 90	NY283337	5,Dew,W,B,Sy,Fel
150	Tarn Crag (Easedale)	34B: LD C&W	549	4	1,801	13	90	NY303093	W,B,Sy,Fel
151	Hard Knott	34B: LD C&W	549	154	1,801	505	89 90	NY231023	Ma,5,Dew,W,B,Sy,Fel
152	Blea Rigg	34B: LD C&W	541	11	1,775	36	90	NY301078	W,B,Sy,Fel
153	Lank Rigg	34B: LD C&W	541	111	1,775	364	89	NY091119	Hu,5,Dew,W,B,Sy,Fel
154	Calf Crag	34B: LD C&W	537	50	1,762	164	90	NY301104	5,Dew,W,B,Sy,Fel
155	Whin Rigg	34B: LD C&W	537	61	1,762	200	89	NY151035	5,Dew,W,B,Sy,Fel
156	Great Mell Fell	34C: LD E	537	198	1,762	650	90	NY396253	Ma,5,Dew,W,B,Sy,Fel
157	Arthur's Pike	34C: LD E	533	4	1,749	13	90	NY460206	W,B,Sy,Fel
158	Great Cockup	34A: LD N	526	90	1,726	295	89 90	NY273333	5,Dew,sHu,W,B,Sy,Fel
159	Gavel Fell	34B: LD C&W	526	75	1,726	246	89	NY116183	5,Dew,W,B,Sy,Fel
160	Eagle Crag	34B: LD C&W	525	27	1,722	89	89 90	NY275121	s5,W,B,Sy,Fel
161	Bonscale Pike	34C: LD E	524	1	1,719	3	90	NY453200	W,B,Sy,Fel
162	Crag Fell	34B: LD C&W	523	114	1,716	374	89	NY097143	Hu,5,Dew,W,B,Sy,Fel
163	Souther Fell	34A: LD N	522	87	1,713	285	90	NY354291	5,Dew,W,B,Sy,Fel
164	High Hartsop Dodd	34C: LD E	519	3	1,703	10	90	NY393107	W,B,Sy,Fel
165	Whinlatter [Brown How]	34A: LD N	517	16	1,696	52	89 90	NY191251	W,B,Sy,Fel
166	Sallows	34C: LD E	516	69	1,693	226	90	NY436039	5,Dew,W,B,Sy,Fel
167	High Tove	34B: LD C&W	515	16	1,690	52	89 90	NY289165	W,B,Sy,Fel
168	Mellbreak	34B: LD C&W	512	260	1,680	853	89	NY148186	Ma,5,Dew,W,B,Sy,Fel
169	Broom Fell	34A: LD N	511	27	1,677	89	89 90	NY194271	s5,W,B,Sy,Fel
170	Hen Comb	34B: LD C&W	509	140	1,670	459	89	NY132181	Hu,5,Dew,sMa,W,B,Sy,Fel
171	Beda Fell [Beda Head]	34C: LD E	509	61	1,670	200	90	NY428171	5,Dew,W,B,Sy,Fel
172	Low Pike	34C: LD E	508	18	1,667	59	90	NY373078	W,B,Sy,Fel
173	Little Mell Fell	34C: LD E	505	226	1,657	741	90	NY423240	Ma,5,Dew,W,B,Sy,Fel
174	Stone Arthur	34C: LD E	504	3	1,654	10	90	NY347092	W,B,Sy,Fel
175	Dodd (Skiddaw)	34A: LD N	502	110	1,647	361	89 90	NY244273	Hu,5,Dew,W,B,Sy,Fel
176	Green Crag	34D: LD S	489	144	1,603	472	96	SD200982	Hu,4,sMa,W,B,Sy,Fel
177	Grike	34B: LD C&W	488	37	1,601	121	89	NY084140	4,W,B,Sy,Fel
178	Baystones [Wansfell]	34C: LD E	487	148	1,597	485	90	NY403051	Hu,4,sMa,W,Fel
179	Longlands Fell	34A: LD N	483	37	1,585	121	89 90	NY275354	4,W,B,Sy,Fel
180	Sour Howes	34C: LD E	483	35	1,585	115	90	NY427032	4,W,B,Sy
181	Gowbarrow Fell	34C: LD E	481	9	1,579	30	90	NY407218	W,B,Sy,Fel
182	Burnbank Fell	34B: LD C&W	475	22	1,558	72	89	NY110209	W,B,Sy
183	Armboth Fell	34B: LD C&W	475	8	1,558	25	89 90	NY295157	W
184	Lingmoor Fell	34B: LD C&W	470	248	1,542	814	90	NY302046	Ma,4,W,B,Sy,Fel
185	Barf	34A: LD N	469	38	1,539	125	89 90	NY214267	4,W,B,Sy,Fel
186	Raven Crag	34B: LD C&W	461	44	1,512	144	90	NY303187	4,W,B,Sy,Fel
187	Barrow	34B: LD C&W	455	71	1,493	233	89 90	NY227218	4,W,B,Sy,Fel
188	Graystones	34A: LD N	452	9	1,483	31	89 90	NY176266	W
189	Catbells	34B: LD C&W	451	87	1,480	285	89 90	NY244198	4,W,B,Sy,Fel
190	Nab Scar	34C: LD E	450	2	1,476	7	90	NY355072	W,B,Sy,Fel
191	Great Crag	34B: LD C&W	449	32	1,473	105	89 90	NY270146	4,W,B,Sy,Fel
192	Binsey	34A: LD N	447	242	1,467	794	89 90	NY225355	Ma,4,W,B,Sy,Fel
193	Glenridding Dodd	34C: LD E	442	45	1,450	148	90	NY380175	4,W,B,Sy,Fel
194	Arnison Crag	34C: LD E	433	32	1,421	105	90	NY393149	4,W,B,Sy,Fel
195	Steel Knotts	34C: LD E	432	51	1,417	167	90	NY440181	4,W,B,Sy,Fel
196	Low Fell	34B: LD C&W	423	266	1,388	873	89	NY137226	Ma,4,W,B,Sy,Fel
197	Buckbarrow	34B: LD C&W	423	4	1,388	13	89	NY135061	W,B,Sy,Fel
198	Gibson Knott	34B: LD C&W	420	10	1,378	33	90	NY316100	W,B,Sy,Fel
199	Fellbarrow (Mosser Fell)	34B: LD C&W	416	52	1,365	169	89	NY132242	4,W,B,Sy,Fel
200	Grange Fell [Brund Fell]	34B: LD C&W	416	38	1,365	125	89 90	NY264162	4,W,B,Sy,Fel
201	Helm Crag	34B: LD C&W	405	70	1,329	230	90	NY326093	4,W,B,Sy,Fel
202	Silver How	34B: LD C&W	395	31	1,296	102	90	NY324066	3,W,B,Sy,Fel
203	Hallin Fell	34C: LD E	388	163	1,273	535	90	NY433198	Ma,3,W,B,Sy,Fel
204	Walla Crag	34B: LD C&W	379	24	1,243	79	89 90	NY276212	W,B,Sy,Fel
205	Ling Fell	34A: LD N	373	97	1,224	318	89 90	NY179285	3,sHu,W,B,Sy,Fel
206	Latrigg	34A: LD N	368	73	1,207	240	89 90	NY279247	3,W,B,Sy,Fel
207	Troutbeck Tongue	34C: LD E	364	73	1,194	240	90	NY422064	3,W,B,Sy,Fel
208	Sale Fell	34A: LD N	359	137	1,178	449	89 90	NY194296	Hu,3,W,B,Sy,Fel
209	High Rigg [Naddle Fell]	34C: LD E	357	189	1,171	620	90	NY308219	Ma,3,W,B,Sy,Fel
210	Rannerdale Knotts	34B: LD C&W	355	66	1,165	217	89	NY167182	3,W,B,Sy,Fel
211	Loughrigg Fell	34B: LD C&W	335	172	1,099	564	90	NY346051	Ma,3,W,B,Sy,Fel
212	Black Fell	34D: LD S	323	126	1,060	413	90	NY340015	Hu,3,W,B,Sy,Fel
213	Holme Fell	34D: LD S	317	165	1,040	541	90	NY315006	Ma,3,W,B,Sy,Fel
214	Castle Crag	34B: LD C&W	290	75	951	246	89 90	NY249159	2,W,Sy,Fel

== Wainwright Outlying Fells by height ==
This list is from the Database of British and Irish Hills (DoBIH) in October 2018, and are peaks the DoBIH marks as being Wainwright Outlying Fells ("WO"). DoBIH also updates the measurements as surveys are recorded, so these tables should not be amended unless the entire DoBIH data is re-downloaded; these measurements may differ slightly from the "By Book" section, which are from older sources. It was noted in 2023 that the list had been created erroneously, giving incorrect prominence figures for non-Birkett fells. This was corrected in April 2024, and a few updates to heights added from DoBIH.

Wainwright Outlying Fells, ranked by height (DoBIH, October 2018)
Height rank	Name	Section	Birkett	Height (m)	Prom. (m)	Height (ft)	Prom. (ft)	Topo map	OS Grid reference	Classification (§ DoBIH codes)
1	Walna Scar	34D: LD S	Birkett	621	16	2,037	52	96	SD257963	N,WO,B,Sy,Fel
2	Black Combe	34D: LD S	Birkett	600	362	1,969	1,188	96	SD135854	Ma,Sim,Dew,WO,B,Sy,Fel
3	Great Yarlside	34C: LD E	Birkett	591	6	1,939	20	90	NY525075	WO,B
4	Howes	34C: LD E		583	3	1,913		90	NY498103	WO
5	Whitfell	34D: LD S	Birkett	573	221	1,880	725	96	SD158929	Ma,5,Dew,WO,B,Sy,Fel
6	Wasdale Pike	34C: LD E	Birkett	565	5	1,854	16	90	NY536084	WO,B,Sy
7	Great Saddle Crag	34C: LD E	Birkett	560	2	1,837	7	90	NY526086	WO,B,Sy
8	Swinklebank Crag	34C: LD E	Birkett	554	46	1,818	151	90	NY500049	5,Dew,WO,B,Sy
9	Buck Barrow	34D: LD S	Birkett	549	72	1,801	236	96	SD151910	5,Dew,WO,B,Sy,Fel
10	Burn Moor	34D: LD S	Birkett	543	23	1,781	75	96	SD151924	s5,WO,B,Sy
11	Ancrow Brow N	34C: LD E		554	46	1818		90	NY502059	WO,Sy
12	Kinmont Buck Barrow	34D: LD S	Birkett	535	25	1,755	82	96	SD146909	s5,WO,B,Sy
13	High Wether Howe	34C: LD E	Birkett	531	66	1,742	217	90	NY514109	5,Dew,WO,B,Sy
14	White Howe	34C: LD E	Birkett	530	73	1,739	240	90	NY523041	5,Dew,WO,B,Sy
15	Caw	34D: LD S	Birkett	529	132	1,736	433	96	SD230944	Hu,5,Dew,WO,B,Sy,Fel
16	The Forest (Borrowdale)	34C: LD E	Birkett	528	40	1,732	131	90	NY527035	5,Dew,WO,B,Sy
17	Lord's Seat (Crookdale)	34C: LD E	Birkett	524	36	1,719	118	90	NY518066	5,Dew,WO,B,Sy
18	Little Yarlside	34C: LD E	Birkett	518	11	1,699	36	90	NY530071	WO,B,Sy
19	Seat Robert	34C: LD E	Birkett	515	30	1,690	98	90	NY526114	5,Dew,WO,B,Sy
20	Capplebarrow	34C: LD E	Birkett	513	22	1,683	72	90	NY508035	s5,WO,B,Sy
21	Fewling Stones	34C: LD E		509	12	1,670		90	NY513117	WO,Sy
22	Sleddale Pike	34C: LD E	Birkett	506	6	1,660	20	90	NY535094	WO,B,Sy
23	Hare Shaw	34C: LD E	Birkett	503	13	1,650	43	90	NY497131	WO,B,Sy
24	Ulthwaite Rigg	34C: LD E	Birkett	502	2	1,647	7	90	NY514093	WO,B,Sy
25	Stainton Pike	34D: LD S	Birkett	498	20	1,634	66	96	SD152942	s4,WO,B,Sy,Fel
26	High House Bank	34C: LD E	Birkett	495	80	1,624	262	90	NY543048	4,WO,B,Sy
27	Yoadcastle	34D: LD S	Birkett	494	57	1,621	187	96	SD156952	4,WO,B,Sy,Fel
28	Robin Hood	34C: LD E	Birkett	493	30	1,617	98	90	NY530058	4,WO,B,Sy
29	Long Crag	34C: LD E	Birkett	493	32	1,617	105	90	NY515052	4,WO,B,Sy
30	Nabs Moor	34C: LD E		493	2	1,617		90	NY503111	WO
31	Whatshaw Common	34C: LD E	Birkett	490	71	1,608	233	90	NY541061	4,WO,B,Sy
32	Woodend Height	34D: LD S	Birkett	489	14	1,604	46	96	SD156954	WO,B,Sy
33	Hesk Fell	34D: LD S	Birkett	477	100	1,565	328	96	SD176946	Hu,4,WO,B,Sy,Fel
34	Stoupdale Head	34D: LD S	Birkett	472	26	1,549	85	96	SD151873	WO,B,Sy
35	The Pikes	34D: LD S	Birkett	469	41	1,539	135	96	SD237947	4,WO,B,Sy
36	White Pike (Birkby Fell)	34D: LD S	Birkett	442	17	1,450	56	96	SD150956	WO,B,Sy
37	Great Ladstones	34C: LD E		440	1	1,444		90	NY532123	WO,Sy
38	Naddle High Forest	34C: LD E	Birkett	435	28	1,427	92	90	NY492143	WO,B,Sy
39	Wallow Crag	34C: LD E	Birkett	433	27	1,421	89	90	NY496149	WO,B,Sy
40	Brunt Knott	34C: LD E	Birkett	427	21	1,401	69	90	NY484006	WO,B,Sy
41	Great Worm Crag	34D: LD S	Birkett	427	34	1,401	112	96	SD194968	4,WO,B,Sy,Fel
42	Hollow Moor	34C: LD E	Birkett	426	78	1,398	256	90	NY469040	4,WO,B,Sy
43	Green Pikes	34D: LD S		420	4	1,378		96	SD236950	WO
44	Hugh's Laithes Pike	34C: LD E		419		1,375		90	NY502151	WO,Sy
45	White Combe	34D: LD S	Birkett	417	4	1,368	13	96	SD154862	WO,B
46	Harper Hills	34C: LD E	Birkett	414	5	1,358	16	90	NY510144	WO,B,Sy
47	Hollow Moor E Top (Green Qtr)	34C: LD E		413	10	1,355		90	NY473042	WO,Sy
48	Todd Fell	34C: LD E	Birkett	401	20	1,316	66	90	NY512020	WO,B,Sy
49	Langhowe Pike	34C: LD E		401		1,316		90	NY528134	WO
50	Whiteside Pike	34C: LD E	Birkett	397	47	1,302	154	90	NY520015	3,WO,B,Sy
51	Naddle Horseshoe [Top 3]	34C: LD E		395	7	1,296		90	NY505152	WO,Sy
52	Potter Fell 1 Brunt Knott	34C: LD E		395	33	1,296		97	SD489998	3,WO,Sy
53	Potter Fell 2 Ulgraves	34C: LD E		390	45	1,280		90	NY496003	3,WO,Sy
54	Heughscar Hill	34C: LD E	Birkett	375	48	1,230	157	90	NY488231	3,WO,B,Sy
55	Stickle Pike	34D: LD S	Birkett	375	116	1,230	381	96	SD212927	Hu,3,WO,B,Sy,Fel
56	The Pike	34D: LD S	Birkett	370	73	1,214	240	96	SD186934	3,WO,B,Sy
57	Lamb Pasture	34C: LD E	Birkett	367	29	1,204	95	90	NY534020	WO,B,Sy
58	Raven's Crag (Stickle Pike)	34D: LD S	Birkett	361	29	1,184	95	96	SD223929	WO,B,Sy
59	Dent	34B: LD C&W		346	6	1,135		89	NY037130	WO
60	Faulds Brow	34A: LD N		344	24	1,129		85	NY299407	WO,Sy
61	Knipescar Common	34C: LD E	Birkett	342	8	1,122	26	90	NY526191	WO,B,Sy
62	Scalebarrow Knott	34C: LD E	Birkett	338	9	1,109	30	90	NY519153	WO,B,Sy
63	Boat How	34B: LD C&W	Birkett	337	79	1,106	259	89 90	NY177034	3,WO,B,Sy,Fel
64	Top o' Selside	34D: LD S	Birkett	334	5	1,096	16	96 97	SD308918	WO,B
65	Ulgraves	34C: LD E		333	31	1,093		97	SD511995	3,WO,Sy
66	Stainton Pike (The Knott)	34D: LD S	Birkett	331	17	1,086	56	96	SD143951	WO,B,Sy
67	Gummer's How	34D: LD S	Birkett	321	217	1,053	712	96 97	SD390884	Ma,3,WO,B,Sy
68	Rough Crag (Birker Moor)	34D: LD S	Birkett	319	70	1,047	230	96	SD161977	3,WO,B,Sy
69	Ponsonby Fell	34B: LD C&W	Birkett	315	34	1,033	112	89	NY081070	3,WO,B,Sy
70	Carron Crag	34D: LD S	Birkett	314	66	1,030	217	96 97	SD325943	3,WO,B,Sy
71	Tarn Hill	34D: LD S	Birkett	313	32	1,027	105	96	SD209920	3,WO,B,Sy
72	Seat How (Birker Moor)	34D: LD S	Birkett	311	58	1,020	190	96	SD165971	3,WO,B,Sy
73	Water Crag	34D: LD S	Birkett	305	36	1,001	118	96	SD153974	3,WO,B,Sy
74	Great Stickle	34D: LD S	Birkett	305	27	1,001	89	96	SD211915	WO,B,Sy
75	Burney	34D: LD S		298	112	978		96 97	SD260858	Hu,2,WO
76	Cold Fell	34B: LD C&W		293	83	961		89	NY058092	2,WO
77	Caermote Hill	34A: LD N		289	59	948		89 90	NY195371	2,WO
78	St. John's Hill [Caermote]	34A: LD N		285	7	935		89 90	NY196376	WO
79	The Knott	34D: LD S		284	25	932		96	SD224919	WO
80	Dunnerdale Fells	34D: LD S		280	12	919		96	SD207918	WO
81	High Knott	34C: LD E		275	55	902		90	NY454001	2,WO
82	Flat Fell	34B: LD C&W		272	74	892		89	NY052137	2,WO
83	Claife Heights	34D: LD S		270	176	886		96 97	SD382973	Ma,2,WO
84	Hugill Fell	34C: LD E		265	11	869		97	SD462994	WO
85	Staveley Fell	34D: LD S		265	42	869		96 97	SD389868	2,WO
86	High Light Haw	34D: LD S		263	13	863		96 97	SD303904	WO
87	Reston Scar	34C: LD E		255	20	837		97	SD460987	WO
88	Beacon Fell	34D: LD S		255	129	837		96 97	SD278907	Hu,2,WO
89	Watch Hill [Setmurthy]	34A: LD N		255.4	129	838		89	NY159318	Ma,2,WO
90	Grandsire	34D: LD S		251	78	823		97	SD432972	2,WO
91	Low Light Haw	34D: LD S		250	15	820		96 97	SD301900	WO
92	Blawith Knott	34D: LD S		248	89	814		96 97	SD260883	2,WO
93	School Knott	34D: LD S		247	2	810		96 97	SD428967	WO
94	Clints Crags	34A: LD N		245	10	804		89	NY159352	WO
95	Latterbarrow	34D: LD S		244	44	801		96 97	SD367990	2,WO
96	Dunmallet	34C: LD E		240	78	787		90	NY467246	2,WO
97	Orrest Head	34C: LD E		238	68	781		96 97	SD414993	2,WO
98	Newton Fell North	34D: LD S		237	0	778		96 97	SD395842	WO
99	Tottlebank Height	34D: LD S		236	25	774		96 97	SD269885	WO
100	Watch Hill	34A: LD N		235	3	771		89	NY149318	WO
101	Scout Scar	34D: LD S		233	3	764		97	SD486919	WO
102	School Knott	34D: LD S		231.7	31.1	760		96 97	SD425974	2,WO
103	Muncaster Fell	34D: LD S		231.4	30.2	759		96	SD112983	2,WO,Fel
104	Irton Pike	34B: LD C&W		229	25	751		89	NY120015	WO
105	Wool Knott	34D: LD S		223	55	732		96 97	SD272896	2,WO
106	Brock Barrow	34D: LD S		221	3	725		96 97	SD298898	WO
107	Hampsfell	34D: LD S		220	1	722		96 97	SD399793	WO
108	Whitbarrow	34D: LD S		215	184	705		97	SD441870	Ma,2,WO
109	Cunswick Scar	34D: LD S		207	37	679		97	SD491943	2,WO
110	Yew Bank	34D: LD S		207	17	679		96 97	SD262909	WO
111	Bigland Barrow	34D: LD S		193	25	633		96 97	SD363839	WO
112	Brant Fell	34D: LD S		191	64	627		96 97	SD409961	1,WO
113	Finsthwaite Heights	34D: LD S		180	0	591		96 97	SD360883	WO
114	Newton Fell South [Dixon]	34D: LD S		177	38	581		96 97	SD413815	1,WO
115	Raven's Barrow [Cartmel]	34D: LD S		152	0	499		96 97	SD412879	WO
116	Humphrey Head	34D: LD S		53	46	174		96 97	SD390739	0,WO

== Wainwrights by book ==
=== Book One: The Eastern Fells ===
The Eastern Fells are centred around Helvellyn and primarily consist of a north-south ridge running between Ullswater and Lakeland's Central Valley.

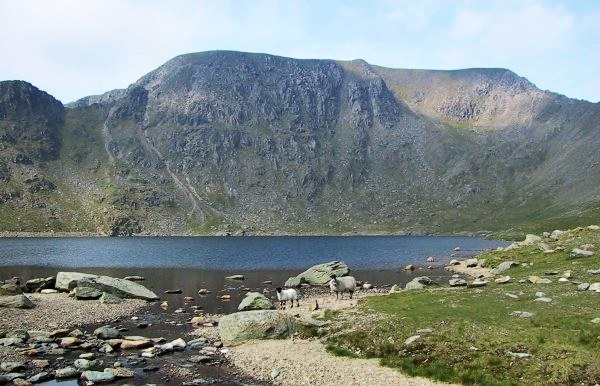
Helvellyn from Red Tarn

1. Helvellyn, 950 m (3,117 ft)
2. Nethermost Pike, 891 m (2,923 ft)
3. Catstycam, 890 m (2,920 ft)
4. Raise, 883 m (2,897 ft)
5. Fairfield, 873 m (2,864 ft)
6. White Side, 863 m (2,831 ft)
7. Dollywaggon Pike, 858 m (2,815 ft)
8. Great Dodd, 857 m (2,812 ft)
9. Stybarrow Dodd, 843 m (2,766 ft)
10. St Sunday Crag, 841 m (2,759 ft)
11. Hart Crag, 822 m (2,697 ft)
12. Dove Crag, 792 m (2,598 ft)
13. Watson's Dodd, 789 m (2,589 ft)
14. Red Screes, 776 m (2,546 ft)
15. Great Rigg, 766 m (2,513 ft)
16. Hart Side, 756 m (2,480 ft)
17. Seat Sandal, 736 m (2,415 ft)
18. Clough Head, 726 m (2,382 ft)
19. Birkhouse Moor, 718 m (2,356 ft)
20. Sheffield Pike, 675 m (2,215 ft)
21. High Pike, 656 m (2,152 ft)
22. Middle Dodd, 654 m (2,146 ft)
23. Little Hart Crag, 637 m (2,090 ft)
24. Birks, 622 m (2,041 ft)
25. Heron Pike, 612 m (2,008 ft)
26. Hartsop above How, 570 m (1,870 ft)
27. Great Mell Fell, 537 m (1,762 ft)
28. High Hartsop Dodd, 519 m (1,703 ft)
29. Low Pike, 508 m (1,667 ft)
30. Little Mell Fell, 505 m (1,657 ft)
31. Stone Arthur, 500 m (1,640 ft) [actually #33 on map]
32. Gowbarrow Fell, 481 m (1,578 ft) [actually #32 on map]
33. Nab Scar, 450 m (1,476 ft)
34. Glenridding Dodd, 442 m (1,450 ft)
35. Arnison Crag, 433 m (1,421 ft)

=== Book Two: The Far Eastern Fells ===
The Far Eastern Fells occupy a broad area to the east of Ullswater, Kirkstone Pass and are bordered by the M6 motorway.

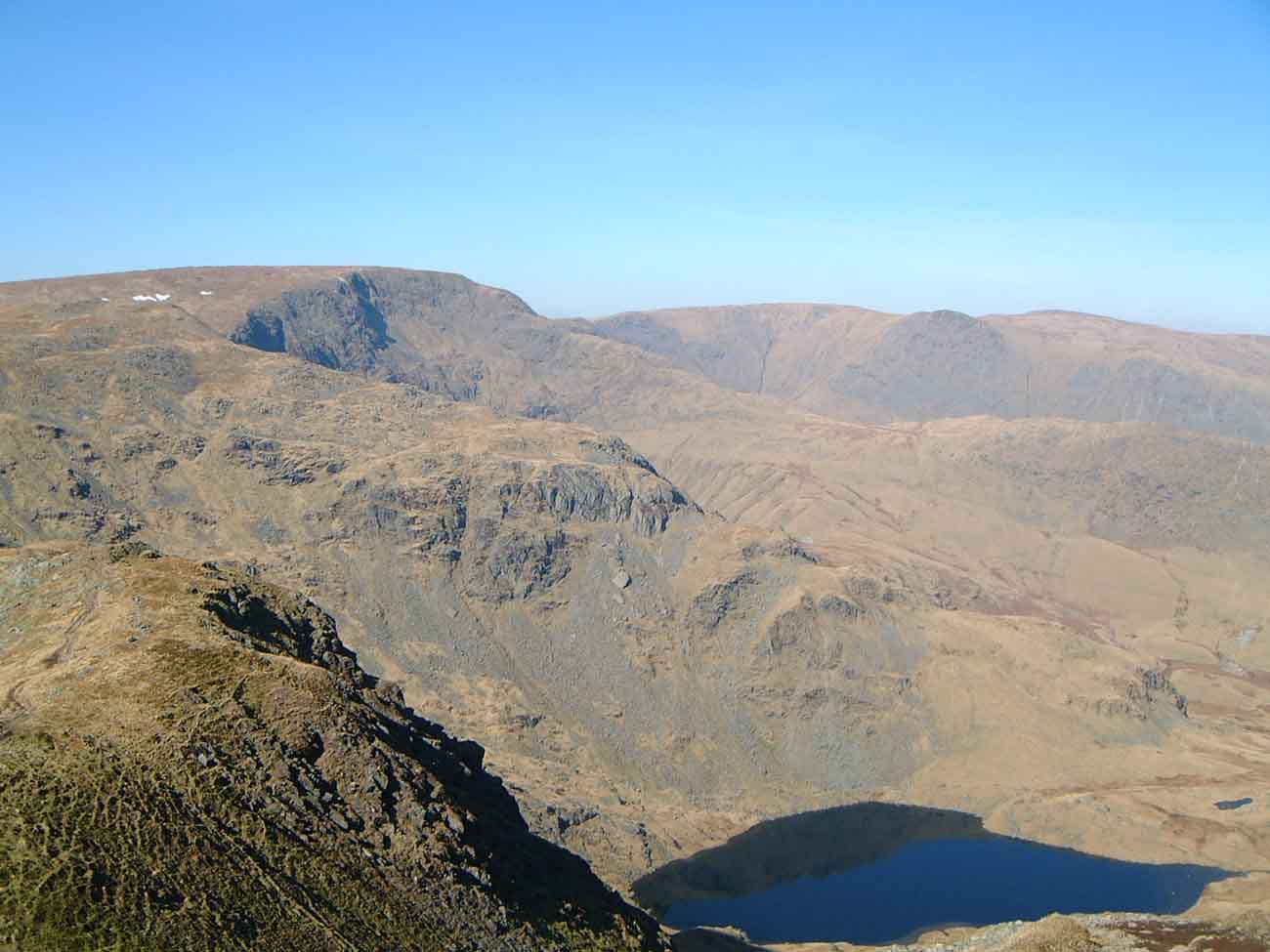
High Street seen from Harter Fell with Small Water in the foreground

1. High Street, 828 m (2,717 ft)
2. High Raise, 802 m (2,631 ft)
3. Rampsgill Head, 792 m (2,598 ft)
4. Thornthwaite Crag, 784 m (2,572 ft)
5. Kidsty Pike, 780 m (2,559 ft)
6. Harter Fell, 778 m (2,552 ft)
7. Caudale Moor, 763 m (2,503 ft)
8. Mardale Ill Bell, 760 m (2,493 ft)
9. Ill Bell, 757 m (2,484 ft)
10. The Knott, 739 m (2,425 ft)
11. Kentmere Pike, 730 m (2,395 ft)
12. Froswick, 720 m (2,362 ft)
13. Branstree, 713 m (2,339 ft)
14. Yoke, 706 m (2,316 ft)
15. Gray Crag, 699 m (2,293 ft)
16. Rest Dodd, 696 m (2,283 ft)
17. Loadpot Hill, 671 m (2,201 ft)
18. Wether Hill, 670 m (2,198 ft)
19. Tarn Crag, 664 m (2,178 ft)
20. Place Fell, 657 m (2,156 ft)
21. Selside Pike, 655 m (2,149 ft)
22. Grey Crag, 638 m (2,093 ft)
23. Hartsop Dodd, 618 m (2,028 ft)
24. Shipman Knotts, 587 m (1,926 ft)
25. The Nab, 576 m (1,890 ft)
26. Angletarn Pikes, 567 m (1,860 ft)
27. Brock Crags, 561 m (1,841 ft)
28. Arthur's Pike, 533 m (1,749 ft)
29. Bonscale Pike, 524 m (1,719 ft)
30. Sallows, 516 m (1,693 ft)
31. Beda Fell, 509 m (1,670 ft)
32. Wansfell, 488 m (1,601 ft)
33. Sour Howes, 483 m (1,585 ft)
34. Steel Knotts, 432 m (1,417 ft)
35. Hallin Fell, 388 m (1,273 ft)
36. Troutbeck Tongue, 364 m (1,194 ft)

=== Book Three: The Central Fells ===
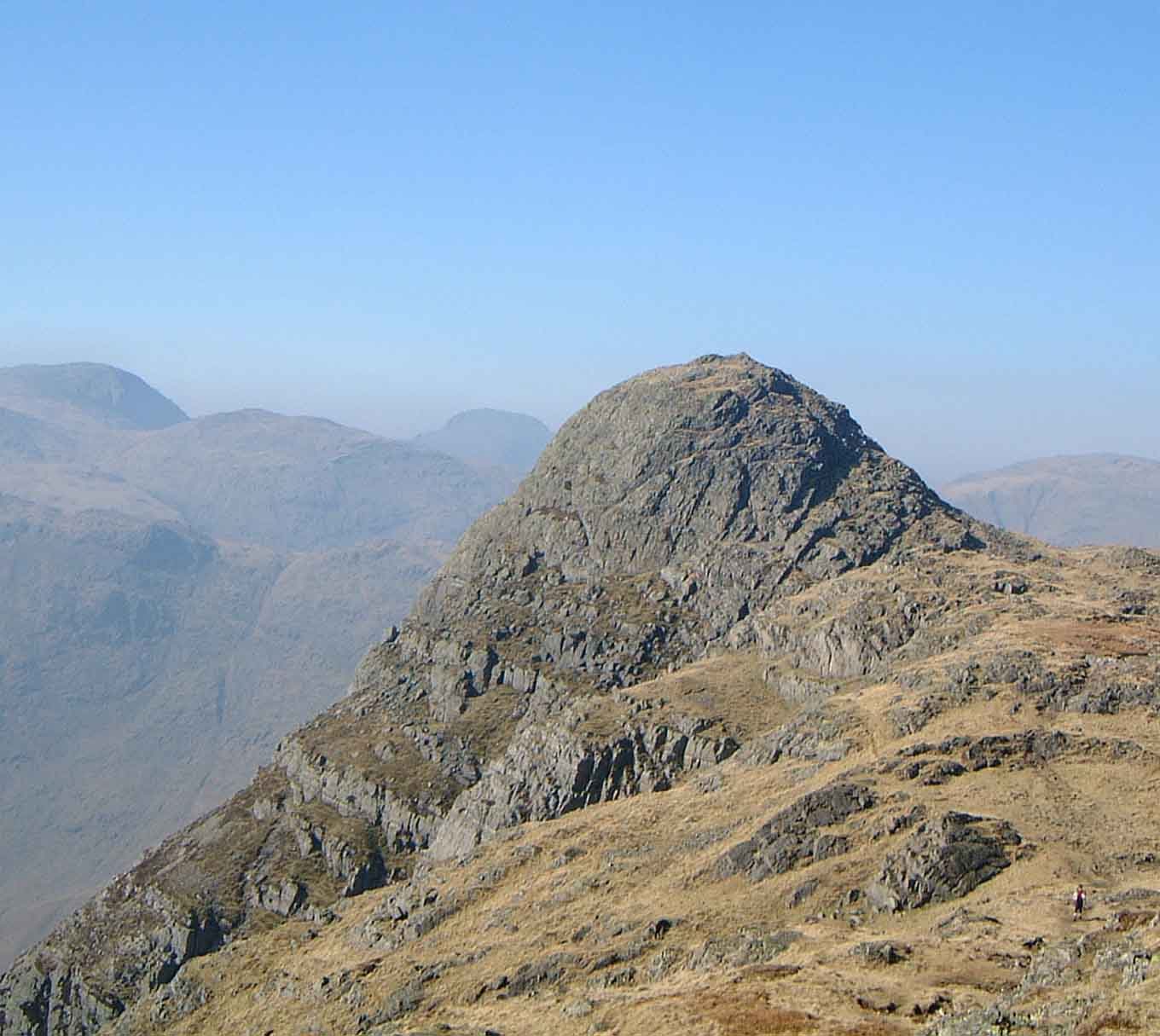
Pike of Stickle as seen from the neighbouring fell of Loft Crag

The Central Fells are situated in the heart of the Lake District, surrounded by the other ranges. The range extends from the ridge between Derwentwater and Thirlmere in the north, to the famous rock peaks of the Langdale Pikes in the south.

1. High Raise, 762 m (2,500 ft)
2. Sergeant Man, 736 m (2,415 ft)
3. Harrison Stickle, 736 m (2,415 ft)
4. Ullscarf, 726 m (2,382 ft)
5. Thunacar Knott, 723 m (2,372 ft)
6. Pike of Stickle, 709 m (2,326 ft)
7. Pavey Ark, 700 m (2,297 ft)
8. Loft Crag, 680 m (2,231 ft)
9. High Seat, 608 m (1,995 ft)
10. Bleaberry Fell, 590 m (1,936 ft)
11. Sergeant's Crag, 571 m (1,873 ft)
12. Steel Fell, 553 m (1,814 ft)
13. Tarn Crag, 550 m (1,804 ft)
14. Blea Rigg, 541 m (1,775 ft)
15. Calf Crag, 537 m (1,762 ft)
16. High Tove, 515 m (1,690 ft)
17. Eagle Crag, 525 m (1,722 ft)
18. Armboth Fell, 479 m (1,572 ft)
19. Raven Crag, 461 m (1,512 ft)
20. Great Crag, 450 m (1,476 ft)
21. Gibson Knott, 420 m (1,378 ft)
22. Grange Fell, 415 m (1,362 ft)
23. Helm Crag, 405 m (1,329 ft)
24. Silver How, 395 m (1,296 ft)
25. Walla Crag, 376 m (1,234 ft)
26. High Rigg, 357 m (1,171 ft)
27. Loughrigg Fell, 335 m (1,099 ft)

=== Book Four: The Southern Fells ===
The Southern Fells occupy a large area to the south of Great Langdale, Borrowdale, Wasdale and include Scafell Pike, the highest peak in England.

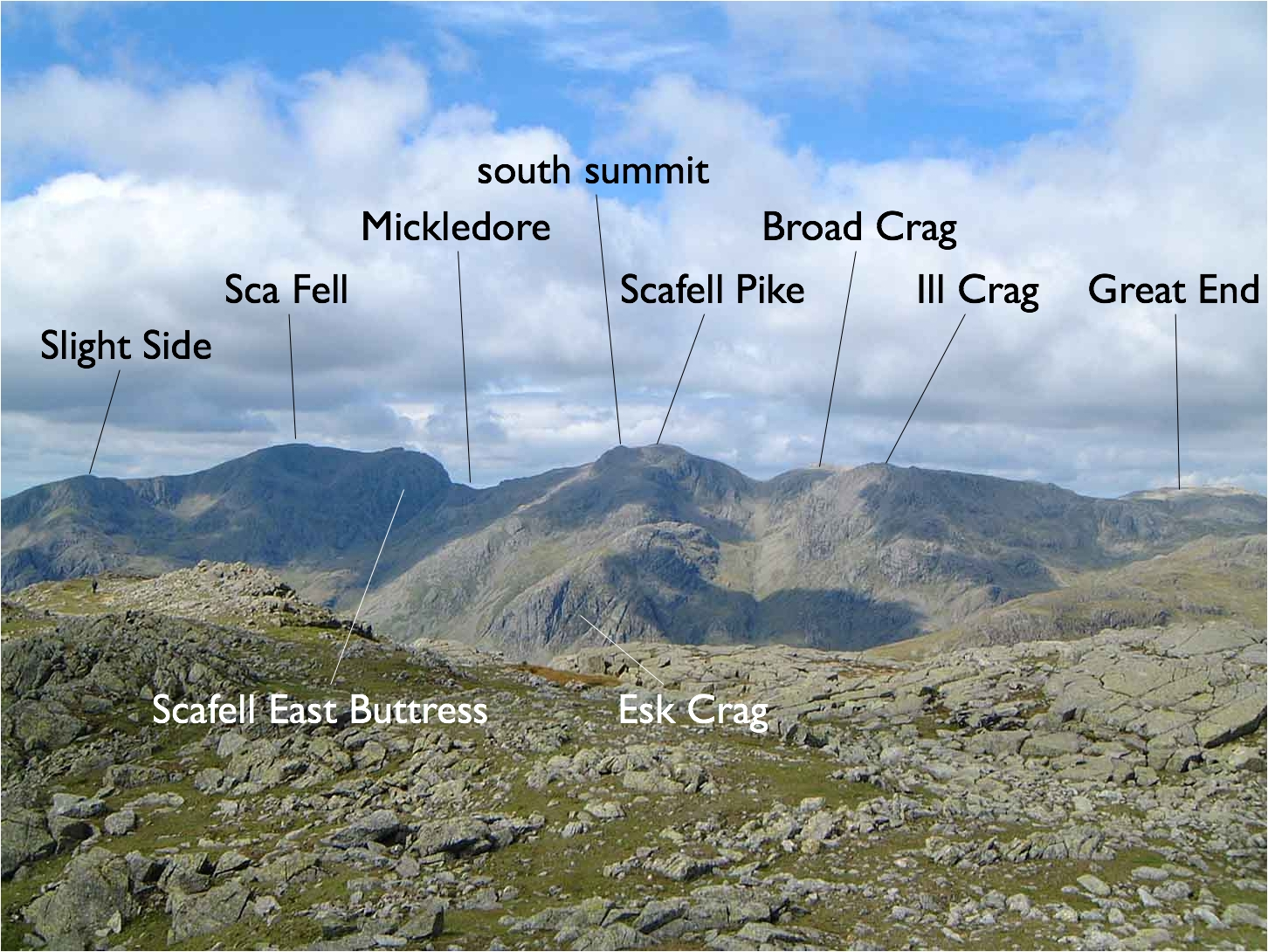
The Scafells looking west from Crinkle Crags (note image is hyperlinked)

1. Scafell Pike, 978 m (3,209 ft)
2. Sca Fell, 964 m (3,163 ft)
3. Great End, 910 m (2,986 ft)
4. Bowfell, 902 m (2,959 ft)
5. Esk Pike, 885 m (2,904 ft)
6. Crinkle Crags, 859 m (2,818 ft)
7. Lingmell, 807 m (2,648 ft)
8. Coniston Old Man, 803 m (2,635 ft)
9. Swirl How, 802 m (2,631 ft)
10. Brim Fell, 796 m (2,612 ft)
11. Great Carrs, 785 m (2,575 ft)
12. Allen Crags, 785 m (2,575 ft)
13. Glaramara, 783 m (2,569 ft)
14. Dow Crag, 778 m (2,552 ft)
15. Grey Friar, 773 m (2,536 ft)
16. Wetherlam, 763 m (2,503 ft)
17. Slight Side, 762 m (2,500 ft)
18. Pike o' Blisco, 709 m (2,326 ft)
19. Cold Pike, 701 m (2,300 ft)
20. Harter Fell, 654 m (2,146 ft)
21. Rossett Pike, 651 m (2,136 ft)
22. Illgill Head, 609 m (1,998 ft)
23. Seathwaite Fell, 601 m (1,972 ft)
24. Rosthwaite Fell, 551 m (1,808 ft)
25. Hard Knott, 549 m (1,801 ft)
26. Whin Rigg, 535 m (1,755 ft)
27. Green Crag, 489 m (1,604 ft)
28. Lingmoor Fell, 469 m (1,539 ft)
29. Black Fell, 323 m (1,060 ft)
30. Holme Fell, 317 m (1,040 ft)

=== Book Five: The Northern Fells ===
The Northern Fells cover a circular area north of Keswick. The range is bordered to the west by Bassenthwaite Lake, the River Greta in the south and Caldew river bounds the eastern edge of the group, flowing away toward Carlisle. It is the smallest group by total number of hills.

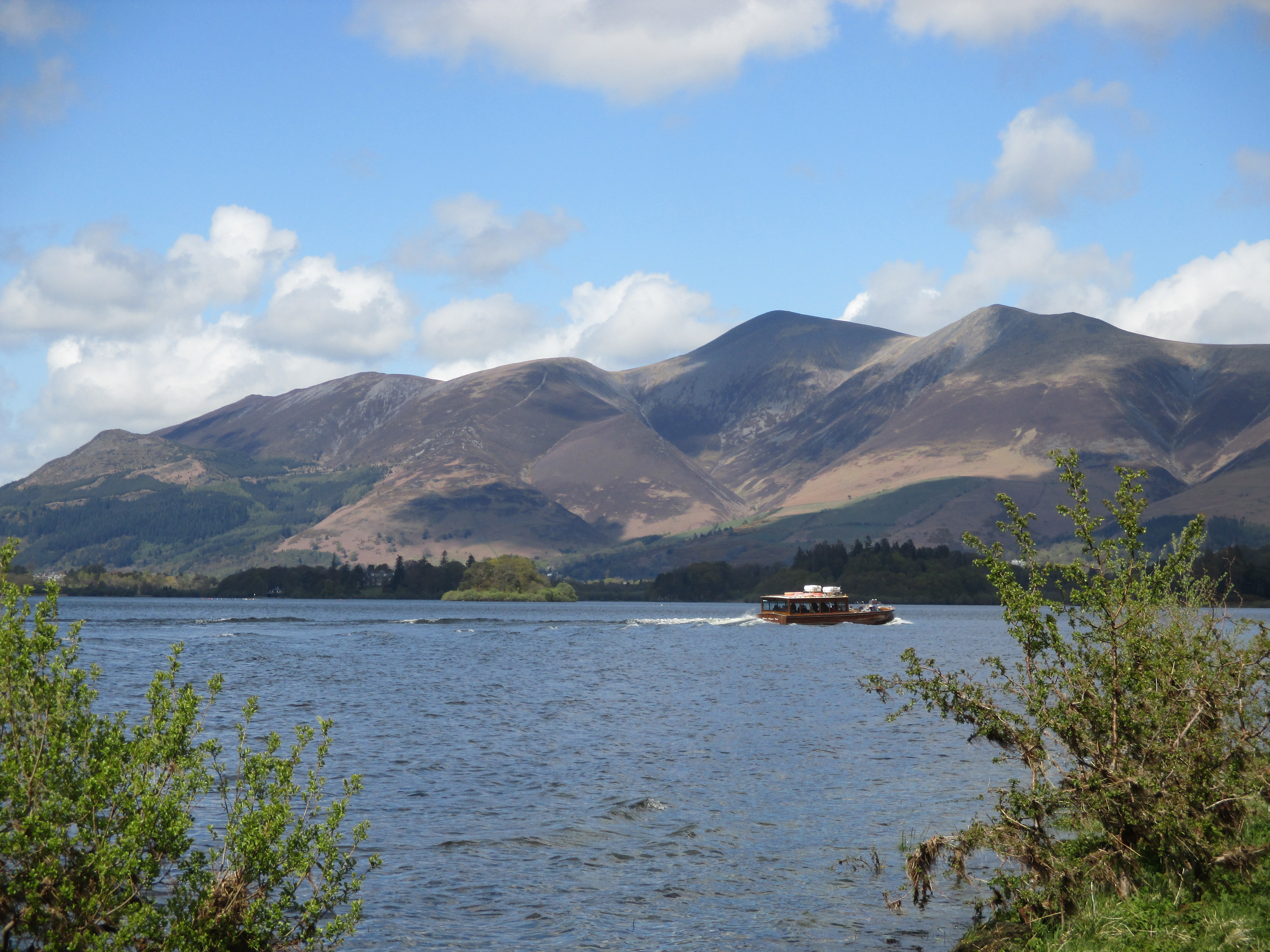
Skiddaw seen from Borrowdale

1. Skiddaw, 931 m (3,054 ft)
2. Blencathra, 868 m (2,848 ft)
3. Skiddaw Little Man, 865 m (2,838 ft)
4. Carl Side, 746 m (2,448 ft)
5. Long Side, 734 m (2,408 ft)
6. Lonscale Fell, 715 m (2,346 ft)
7. Knott, 710 m (2,329 ft)
8. Bowscale Fell, 702 m (2,303 ft)
9. Great Calva, 690 m (2,264 ft)
10. Ullock Pike, 690 m (2,264 ft)
11. Bannerdale Crags, 683 m (2,241 ft)
12. Bakestall, 673 m (2,208 ft)
13. Carrock Fell, 663 m (2,175 ft)
14. High Pike, 658 m (2,159 ft)
15. Great Sca Fell, 651 m (2,136 ft)
16. Mungrisdale Common, 633 m (2,077 ft)
17. Brae Fell, 586 m (1,923 ft)
18. Meal Fell, 550 m (1,804 ft)
19. Great Cockup, 526 m (1,726 ft)
20. Souther Fell, 522 m (1,713 ft)
21. Dodd, 502 m (1,647 ft)
22. Longlands Fell, 483 m (1,585 ft)
23. Binsey, 447 m (1,467 ft)
24. Latrigg, 367 m (1,204 ft)

=== Book Six: The North Western Fells ===
The North Western Fells occupy an oval area beneath the Buttermere and Borrowdale valley systems.

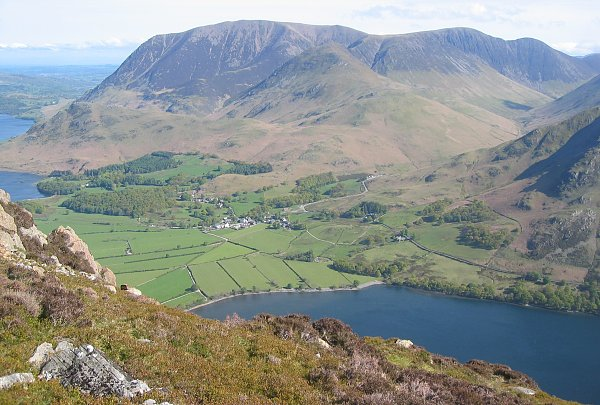
The huge bulk of the Grasmoor massif seen over the Crummock Water valley

1. Grasmoor, 852 m (2,795 ft)
2. Eel Crag (Crag Hill), 839 m (2,753 ft)
3. Grisedale Pike, 791 m (2,595 ft)
4. Sail, 773 m (2,536 ft)
5. Wandope, 772 m (2,533 ft)
6. Hopegill Head, 770 m (2,526 ft)
7. Dale Head, 753 m (2,470 ft)
8. Robinson, 737 m (2,418 ft)
9. Hindscarth, 727 m (2,385 ft)
10. Whiteside, 707 m (2,320 ft)
11. Scar Crags, 672 m (2,205 ft)
12. Whiteless Pike, 660 m (2,165 ft)
13. High Spy, 653 m (2,142 ft)
14. Causey Pike, 637 m (2,090 ft)
15. Maiden Moor, 575 m (1,886 ft)
16. Ard Crags, 581 m (1,906 ft)
17. Outerside, 568 m (1,864 ft)
18. Knott Rigg, 556 m (1,824 ft)
19. Lord's Seat, 552 m (1,811 ft)
20. Whinlatter, 517 m (1,696 ft)
21. Broom Fell, 511 m (1,677 ft)
22. Barf, 468 m (1,535 ft)
23. Barrow, 455 m (1,493 ft)
24. Graystones, 452 m (1,483 ft)
25. Catbells, 451 m (1,480 ft)
26. Ling Fell, 373 m (1,224 ft)
27. Sale Fell, 359 m (1,178 ft)
28. Rannerdale Knotts, 355 m (1,165 ft)
29. Castle Crag, 298 m (978 ft)

=== Book Seven: The Western Fells ===
The Western Fells are centred around Great Gable and form a triangular area between Buttermere and Wasdale.

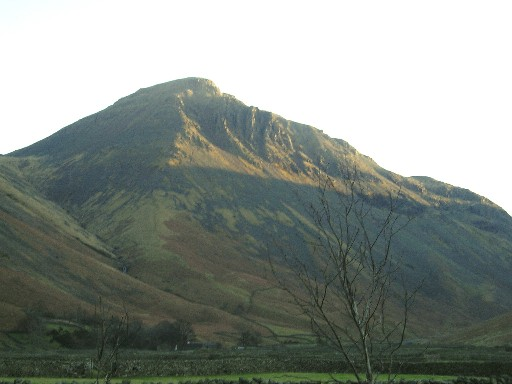
Great Gable from Wasdale. The cliff at centre is the Napes of Great Gable.

1. Great Gable, 899 m (2,949 ft)
2. Pillar, 892 m (2,927 ft)
3. Scoat Fell, 841 m (2,759 ft)
4. Red Pike (Wasdale), 826 m (2,709 ft)
5. Steeple, 819 m (2,687 ft)
6. High Stile, 807 m (2,648 ft)
7. Kirk Fell, 802 m (2,631 ft)
8. Green Gable, 801 m (2,628 ft)
9. Haycock, 797 m (2,614 ft)
10. Red Pike (Buttermere), 755 m (2,476 ft)
11. High Crag, 744 m (2,441 ft)
12. Brandreth, 715 m (2,345 ft)
13. Caw Fell, 697 m (2,288 ft)
14. Grey Knotts, 697 m (2,287 ft)
15. Seatallan, 692 m (2,270 ft)
16. Fleetwith Pike, 648 m (2,126 ft)
17. Base Brown, 646 m (2,119 ft)
18. Starling Dodd, 633 m (2,077 ft)
19. Yewbarrow, 628 m (2,060 ft)
20. Great Borne, 616 m (2,021 ft)
21. Haystacks, 597 m (1,958 ft)
22. Middle Fell, 582 m (1,909 ft)
23. Blake Fell, 573 m (1,880 ft)
24. Lank Rigg, 541 m (1,775 ft)
25. Gavel Fell, 526 m (1,725 ft)
26. Crag Fell, 523 m (1,715 ft)
27. Mellbreak, 512 m (1,680 ft)
28. Hen Comb, 509 m (1,670 ft)
29. Grike, 488 m (1,601 ft)
30. Burnbank Fell, 475 m (1,559 ft)
31. Low Fell, 423 m (1,388 ft)
32. Buckbarrow, 423 m (1,388 ft)
33. Fellbarrow, 416 m (1,365 ft)

== Hills where the Wainwright summit is not the highest point ==
Data from the Database of British Hills. Minimum horizontal separation 20 metres.

Fell	Wainwright summit	Highest point	Distance	Height +/-
Grange Fell	tor 70m SW of Brund (415.7m, NY 26412 16240)	Ether Knott (420.1m, NY 26835 17158)	1,010m	4.5m
Whinlatter	ground 6m E of shelter (517m, NY1911425132)	cairn on east top (525m, NY 19698 24903)	630m	8m
Seathwaite Fell	N cairn (601.1m, NY 22903 10180)	cairn on main summit (631m, NY 22735 09710)	500m	29.9m
Whiteside	W top (707m, NY 17045 21948)	E top (719.4m, NY 17525 22100)	500m	12.4m
Wether Hill	cairn 30m NW of N top (671.5m, NY4557116782)	S top (675.7m, NY 45464 16307)	490m	4.2m
Heron Pike	outcrop on S top (612m, NY 35598 08310)	rock on N top (621.3m, NY 35723 08671)	380m	9.3m
Illgill Head	cairn (605.8m, NY 16544 04803)	rock 100m S of windshelter (608.8m, NY 16898 04924)	370m	3m
Graystones	small cairn (450.4m, NY 17616 26621)	no feature to SE (455.3m, NY 17783 26420)	260m	4.9m
High Stile	rock 13m ENE of cairn (806.2m, NY1675214793)	cairn on outcrop on E spur (806.5m, NY1700914817)	260m	0.3m
Armboth Fell	rocky mound to S (475.0m, NY 29583 15739)	large outcrop to N (479.2m, NY 29679 15968)	250m	4.2m
Brock Crags	large cairn (561.2m, NY 41666 13661)	grassy mound to E (564.3m, NY 41904 13699)	240m	3.1m
Gibson Knott	NW cairn (420.1m, NY 31690 10036)	SE cairn (422.1m, NY 31853 09923)	200m	2m
Birks	cairn (NY 38179 14485)	grass mound to SW (624m, NY 38020 14357)	200m	
Gray Crag	north of wall (NY 42672 11869)	rock S of wall (698.1m, NY 42757 11707)	180m	
Broom Fell	cairn (509.3m, NY 19444 27191)	heather to SE (510.2m, NY 19544 27051)	170m	0.9m
Glaramara	NE cairn (781.7m, NY 24722 10561)	rock 10m S of SW cairn (782.7m, NY 24601 10456)	160m	1m
Thunacar Knott	N cairn (NY 27913 08136)	rock 3m NNE of S cairn (723m, NY 27975 07992)	160m	
Rampsgill Head	SW cairn (791.4m, NY 44227 12772)	rock to NE (792.4m, NY 44333 12871)	150m	1m
Bonscale Pike	small cairn to N (524m, NY 45347 20085)	cairn to S (~524.2m, NY 45314 19950)	140m	~0.2m
Bakestall	N cairn (667.5m, NY 26634 30855)	ground 15m SW of S cairn (673.5m, NY 26631 30738)	120m	6m
Scar Crags	SW cairn (671.1m, NY 20749 20598)	NE cairn (672.2m, NY 20850 20662)	120m	1.1m
Gavel Fell	cairn (524.1m, NY 11698 18384)	no feature to NNW (524.3m, NY 11657 18499)	120m	0.2m
Tarn Crag (E'dale)	cairn (549m, NY 30371 09302)	no feature to WNW (552m, NY 30277 09335)	100m	3m
Loadpot Hill	boundary stone (671.6m, NY 45731 18083)	ground to WSW (672m, NY 45636 18046)	100m	0.4m
Gowbarrow Fell	trig point (481.2m, NY 40762 21821)	embedded rock on S knoll (481.2m, NY 40731 21722)	100m	0.01m
Bannerdale Crags	cairn (NY 33612 29076)	pile of stones to SW (684.1m, NY 33530 29026)	100m	
Great Dodd	windshelter (NY 34272 20452)	ground SSE of cairn to NW (857m, NY 34204 20528)	100m	
Blea Rigg	cairn (541.5m, NY 30166 07834)	rocky knoll to WSW (545.1m, NY 30079 07807)	90m	3.6m
Stony Cove Pike	cairn (762.7m, NY 41867 09997)	rock to W (763.7m, NY 41782 10006)	90m	1m
Hart Crag	cairn (NY 36891 11207)	outcrop to NW (823.1m, NY 36818 11262)	90m	
High Street	trig point (NY 44077 11049)	no feature to NE (828.5m, NY 44141 11116)	90m	
Meal Fell	windshelter (547.4m, NY 28258 33711)	small cairn to NE (549.4m, NY 28301 33763)	70m	2m
Ling Fell	trig point (373.3m, NY 17961 28593)	no feature SSE of trig point (374m, NY 17994 28535)	70m	0.7m
High Pike (S'dale)	small cairn (657m, NY 37443 08830)	ground to NNW (657.5m, NY 37408 08891)	70m	0.5m
Nethermost Pike	small cairn (NY 34406 14157)	cairn to NW (891.3m, NY 34367 14217)	70m	
Sour Howes	shaly ridge (NY 42832 03198)	grassy hummock to WNW (483m, NY 42765 03217)	70m	
Tarn Crag (FE)	cairn (663.4m, NY 48848 07851)	grassy rise to WNW (663.9m, NY 48791 07865)	60m	0.5m
Rest Dodd	cairn (NY 43271 13701)	grass mound to SSW (696m, NY 43256 13646)	60m	
Haystacks	N cairn (595m, NY 19336 13204)	S cairn (597m, NY 19335 13151)	50m	2m
Troutbeck Tongue	cairn (362m, NY 42233 06386)	knoll to N (364m, NY 42240 06427)	40m	2m
Grey Crag	cairn (636.3m, NY 49713 07177)	outcrop to N (638m, NY 49714 07220)	40m	1.7m
Selside Pike	windshelter (654.2m, NY 49073 11186)	grassy rise to SSW (655m, NY 49062 11145)	40m	0.8m
Brandreth	cairn (714.6m, NY 21489 11928)	rock WSW of cairn (715m, NY 21454 11916)	40m	0.4m
Thornthwaite Crag	beacon (NY 43138 10008)	rock to N (784m, NY 43150 10050)	40m	
Seat Sandal	cairn (736.4m, NY 34390 11515)	rock on knoll to ENE (736.8m, NY 34420 11530)	30m	0.4m
Crag Hill	trig point (838.9m, NY 19270 20365)	no feature S of trig point (839.2m, NY 19274 20333)	30m	0.3m
Lonscale Fell	cairn (NY 28540 27171)	ground S of cairn (715m, NY 28545 27144)	30m	
Great Borne	trig point (615.6m, NY 12391 16381)	rock S of trig point (616m, NY 12394 16358)	20m	0.4m
Dale Head	large cairn (753.7m, NY 22310 15330)	no feature W of cairn (754.0m, NY 22289 15325)	20m	0.3m
Fellbarrow	trig point (415.8m, NY 13222 24247)	no feature SE of trig point (416.0m, NY 13240 24235)	20m	0.2m

== Bibliography ==
- Wainwright, A (1955). A Pictorial Guide to the Lakeland Fells, Book 1: The Eastern Fells. London: Frances Lincoln. ISBN 0-7112-2454-4.
- Wainwright, A (1957). A Pictorial Guide to the Lakeland Fells, Book 2: The Far Eastern Fells. London: Frances Lincoln. ISBN 0-7112-2455-2.
- Wainwright, A (1958). A Pictorial Guide to the Lakeland Fells, Book 3: The Central Fells. London: Frances Lincoln. ISBN 0-7112-2229-0.
- Wainwright, A (1960). A Pictorial Guide to the Lakeland Fells, Book 4: The Southern Fells. London: Frances Lincoln. ISBN 0-7112-2457-9.
- Wainwright, A (1962). A Pictorial Guide to the Lakeland Fells, Book 5: The Northern Fells. London: Frances Lincoln. ISBN 0-7112-2458-7.
- Wainwright, A (1964). A Pictorial Guide to the Lakeland Fells, Book 6: The North Western Fells. London: Frances Lincoln. ISBN 0-7112-2459-5.
- Wainwright, A (1966). A Pictorial Guide to the Lakeland Fells, Book 7: The Western Fells. London: Frances Lincoln. ISBN 0-7112-2460-9.

== DoBIH codes ==
The Database of British and Irish Hills (DoBIH) uses the following codes for the various classifications of mountains and hills in the British Isles, which many of the above peaks also fall into:

- Ma Marilyn
- Hu HuMP
- Sim Simm
- 5 Dodd
- M Munro
- MT Munro Top
- F Furth
- C Corbett
- G Graham
- D Donald
- DT Donald Top
- Hew Hewitt
- N Nuttall
- Dew Dewey
- DDew Donald Dewey
- HF Highland Five
- 4 400-499m Tump
- 3 300-399m Tump (GB)
- 2 200-299m Tump (GB)
- 1 100-199m Tump (GB)
- 0 0-99m Tump (GB)
- W Wainwright
- WO Wainwright Outlying Fell
- B Birkett
- Sy Synge
- Fel Fellranger
- CoH County Top – Historic (pre-1974)
- CoA County Top – Administrative (1974 to mid-1990s)
- CoU County Top – Current County or Unitary Authority
- CoL County Top – Current London Borough
- SIB Significant Island of Britain
- Dil Dillon
- A Arderin
- VL Vandeleur-Lynam
- MDew Myrddyn Dewey
- O Other list (which includes):
  - Bin Binnion
  - Bg Bridge
  - BL Buxton & Lewis
  - Ca Carn
  - CT Corbett Top
  - GT Graham Top
  - Mur Murdo
  - P500 P500
  - P600 P600
- Un unclassified

prefixes:
- s sub
- x deleted

suffixes:
= twin

== See also ==
- Lists of mountains and hills in the British Isles
- List of hill passes of the Lake District
- The Outlying Fells of Lakeland
- List of Birketts in the Lake District
