= Steeple (Lake District) =

Fell in the Lake District, Cumbria, England

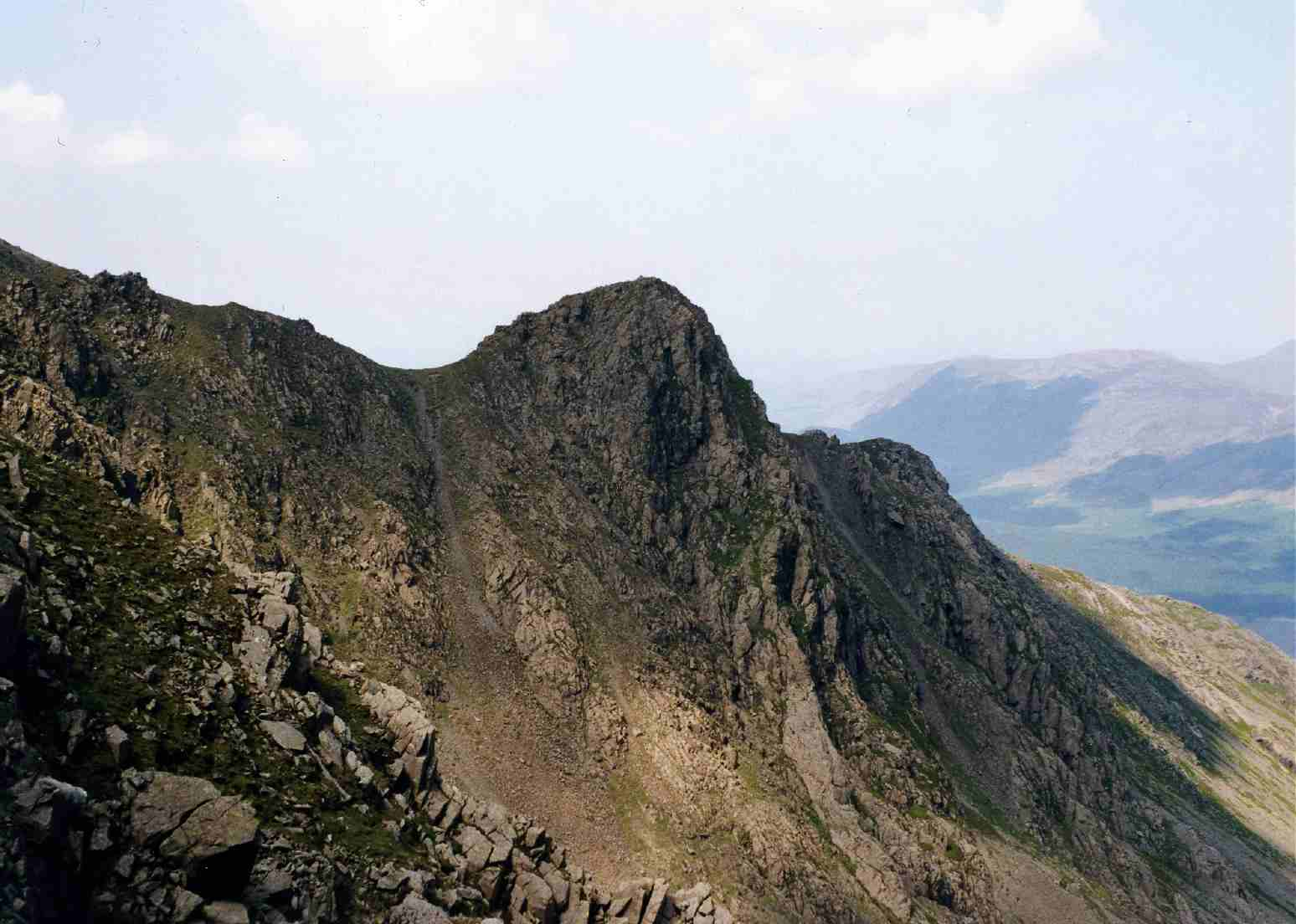
- Steeple seen from Wind Gap between Scoat Fell and Pillar

Highest point
- Elevation: 819 m (2,687 ft)
- Prominence: 21 m (69 ft)
- Listing: Wainwright, Nuttall
- Coordinates: 54°29′35″N 3°18′07″W

Geography
- Location within the Lake District Location within the former Borough of Copeland
- Location: Cumbria, England
- Parent range: Lake District, Western Fells
- OS grid: NY157116
- Topo map: OS Landranger 89, OS Explorer Outdoor Leisure 4

Steeple is a fell in the English Lake District. It is situated in the mountainous area between Ennerdale and Wasdale and reaches a height of 819 metres (2,687 feet). Steeple is really part of Scoat Fell, being just the rocky northern projection of that fell. However, because of its prominent peak and steep crags it has earned the reputation of being a separate fell. The Lake District writer Alfred Wainwright rated Steeple and its name very highly saying, “Seen on a map, it commands the eye and quickens the pulse, seen in reality it does the same“.

== Topography ==
Steeple’s close proximity to Scoat Fell robs it of being one of the best fells in the area; the two fells are linked by the Steeple arête with a lowest height of 798 metres (2,618 ft). The arête is stony and loose underfoot due to erosion and it is better to stick to the firmer rock along the crest. Scoat Fell is only 22 metres (72 ft) higher than Steeple but the short distance between them means that the higher dominates the lower significantly.

== Ascents ==
Steeple can be ascended from Wasdale or Ennerdale; it is usually climbed in conjunction with other nearby fells such as Pillar, Scoat Fell and Red Pike as part of the Mosedale Horseshoe walk. It can be climbed directly from Ennerdale by a public footpath that leaves the valley at grid reference NY151138 and goes south through the forest to reach the open fell and climbs the north ridge of Steeple to reach the summit.

== Summit ==
The top of the fell is a sharp peak with hardly room for a cairn. In fact there is room for only a few people and often there is a queue to stand at the highest point. The ground falls away sharply on all sides especially to Windgap Cove to the east. The view is limited by higher fells to the south and east but there is an excellent view of Ennerdale Water and an opportunity to examine the nearby cliffs and hollows of Mirk and Mirklin Coves.
