= Birks (Lake District) =

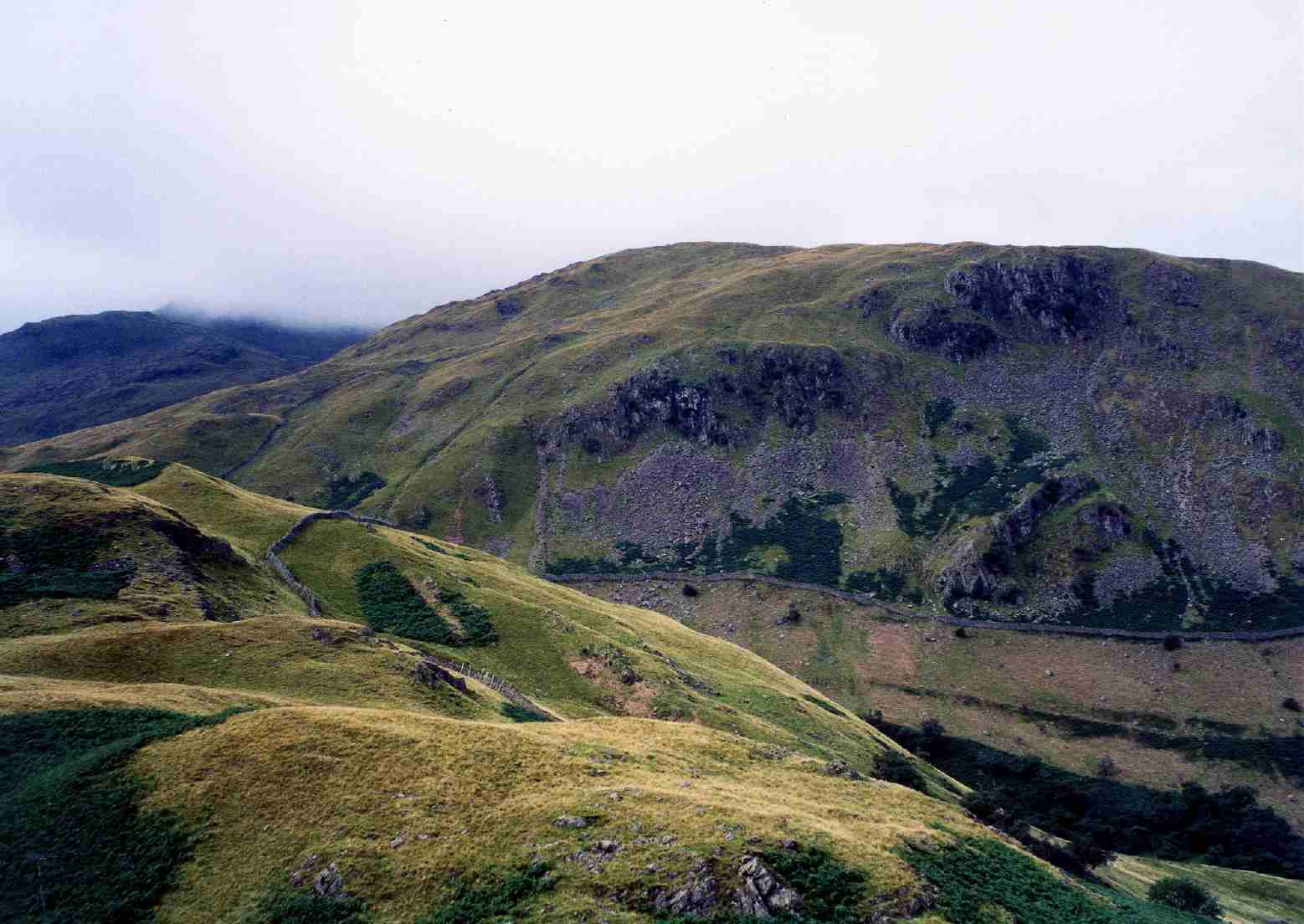
- Birks seen across Hag Beck from Arnison Crag, 1 km to the NE.

Highest point
- Elevation: 622 m (2,041 ft)
- Prominence: 19 m (62 ft)
- Parent peak: St Sunday Crag
- Listing: Nuttall, Wainwright
- Coordinates: 54°31′12″N 2°57′22″W

Geography
- Location within the Lake District
- Location: Cumbria, England
- Parent range: Lake District, Eastern Fells
- OS grid: NY380143
- Topo map: OS Landranger 90 OS Explorer 5

Birks is a fell in the English Lake District situated two kilometres south west of the village of Patterdale in the Eastern Fells. The fells summit sits on a shoulder of the north east ridge of the higher and better known fell of St Sunday Crag, by which it is dominated, walkers often pass over the top of Birks either climbing or descending from the larger fell. The fell's name means a place where Birch trees predominate.

== Topography ==
Birks reaches a height of 622 metres (2,041 feet) and is characterised by a grassy summit ridge which has precipitous craggy slopes to the north and west which fall away to the valley of Grisedale, its southern flank is steep and grassy and ends in the valley of Deepdale and to the north east the main ridge descends towards Patterdale over Black Crag and through Glenamara Park.

Birks is regarded by guide book writers as an unspectacular fell, it has 19 metres (62 ft) of prominence from St Sunday Crag and therefore qualifies as a Nuttall, while Alfred Wainwright gives the fell a separate chapter in his Pictorial Guide to the Lakeland Fells because "it is sufficiently well defined to deserve a separate name".

== Geology ==
The principal rocks of the summit area are the pebbly sandstones of the Blind Cove Member. The flanks carry andesite sills and volcaniclastic sandstone.

== Ascents ==
The fell is always climbed from the Patterdale valley, with no other starting point being viable. The ascent is a pleasant walk through the wooded Glenamara Park along a footpath which leaves Patterdale and follows Hag Beck and then a ruined dry stone wall to the summit. An alternative route goes via Thornhow End and finds a way through Black Crags at attain the top of the fell. Most walkers who climb Birks will continue on to St Sunday Crag which is a comfortable climb of about 240 metres (790 ft) with a few small dips on the ridge.

== Summit ==
The highlight of the view from the summit is a good view of the lower reach of Ullswater.
