= Hartsop above How =

Fell in the United Kingdom

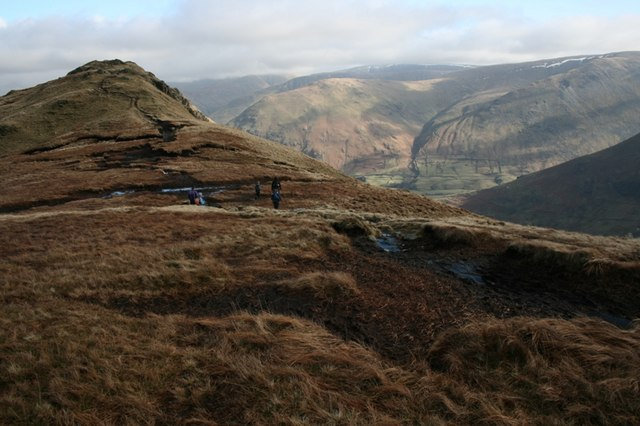

Highest point
- Elevation: 586 m (1,923 ft)
- Prominence: c 30 m (100 ft)
- Parent peak: Hart Crag
- Listing: Wainwright
- Coordinates: 54°29′58″N 2°57′15″W

Geography
- Location within the Lake District
- Location: Cumbria, England
- Parent range: Lake District, Eastern Fells
- OS grid: NY383120
- Topo map: OS Explorer OL5, OL7

Hartsop above How was in the 19th century the name of a township in the parish of Patterdale. The name is now applied to a fell in the English Lake District, an outlier of the Helvellyn range in the Eastern Fells. It stands above Brothers Water and the Ullswater–Ambleside road.

== Topography ==
Although properly the long north-east ridge of Hart Crag, Alfred Wainwright accorded Hartsop above How the status of a separate fell in his Pictorial Guide to the Lakeland Fells and that convention is followed here. The name, with the middle word uncapitalised, is that used on Ordnance Survey maps and has wide support in guidebooks, although it is sometimes hyphenated. Wainwright states that the local name for the fell is Gill Crag.

A three-mile ridge of high ground branches off north-east from the Fairfield horseshoe at Hart Crag. It turns gradually more northward, resembling a billhook in plan. To the north is Deepdale, a long curving valley with a marshy and rather dismal character. The southern boundary of Hartsop above How is formed by Dovedale, a valley of woodlands and waterfalls. Both dales meet the main valley of Kirkstone/Goldrill Beck which flows north through Patterdale to Ullswater.

Hartsop above How has a number of knolls along its length, the principal tops being above Gill Crag—the summit—and Gale Crag (1,679 feet (512 m)). The ridge is generally grassy, but with considerable rock outcropping, particularly on the Deepdale side. The main faces here are Bleaberry Knott, Gale Crag, Holly Crag and Erne Nest Crag. Gill Crag, The Perch and Black Crag loom above Dovedale. A stone wall follows the crest almost as far as the summit.

At the foot of the Dovedale face and continuing round above Brothers Water is Low Wood. This is an expanse of native woodland. Within the woodland are the remains of Hartsop Hall Mine. This was a lead mine operating at least as far back as the 17th century and closing in 1942. Four levels were driven northward into the fellside of Hartsop above How, but the production of ore was never significant.

== Summit ==
The summit carries a small cairn on grass. The view is good with the craggy heads of Deepdale and Dovedale in close-up.

== Ascents ==
The only practicable line of ascent for walkers is along the ridge, either from the end at Deepdale Bridge, or cutting up the southern side from Cow Bridge and Brothers Water. A path follows the crest and continues across peaty ground toward the rocky top of Hart Crag.

== Origin of the Name ==
The name Hartsop above How first appeared on the Ordnance Survey’s six-inch map in 1863. The name, along with Patterdale below How, indicated the location of two townships within the parish of Patterdale. The wording Hartsop above How was positioned across the width of the valley just south of Brothers Water. In 1868 the first one-inch map of the area, based on the six-inch map, was published and positioned the name further to the west, over the north-east ridge of Hart Crag. Subsequent editions of the Ordnance Survey’s small-scale maps (including the Lake District Tourist Map) published during the 20^{th} century positioned Hartsop above How on different parts of the ridge, partly overlapping the ridge or omitted the name entirely.

In 1976, during the Ordnance Survey’s resurvey of England, the name Hartsop above How was reviewed. A surveyor, aware of the mapping inconsistencies and the queries about the fell name expressed by Alfred Wainwright and others, wrote a short explanatory report. The report explains the root of the problem - the sheet margins of the six-inch map and the later small-scale maps did not coincide. The sheet margin for the small-scale maps ran north-south along the valley bottom south of Brothers Water. As cartographic practises at the time did not permit names crossing over sheet margins, the name Hartsop above How was moved to the west away from the original positioning of the township name on the six-inch map. This gave the mistaken impression to users that the name referred to the ridge.The Ordnance Survey’s 1976 review recognised their past mistake but concluded that Hartsop above How was by then so widely recognised as a fell name that it should be retained.
