= Stone Arthur =

- Location within the Lake District

Highest point
- Elevation: 503 m (1,650 ft)
- Prominence: c. 2 m
- Parent peak: Great Rigg
- Listing: Wainwright
- Coordinates: 54°28′29″N 3°00′28″W

Geography
- Location: Cumbria, England
- Parent range: Lake District, Eastern Fells
- OS grid: NY348093
- Topo map: OS Explorer OL5, OL7

Stone Arthur is a fell in the English Lake District, an outlier of the Fairfield group in the Eastern Fells. It stands above Grasmere village.

== Topography ==
Stone Arthur is properly the south western ridge of Great Rigg, but was given the status of a separate fell by Alfred Wainwright in his Pictorial Guide to the Lakeland Fells and that convention is followed here. His decision was based on it having a summit tor with"a short wall of rock like a ruined castle.". This outcrop appears particularly impressive from Grasmere village, from where the higher fells are hidden.

From the top of Great Rigg the main ridge ploughs on due south, descending over the tops of Heron Pike and Nab Scar and carrying the ever popular Fairfield horseshoe walk. A second shorter ridge descends steadily to the south west over gradually roughening ground, until after 3/4 mile (1.2 km) a rock outcrop is thrust up. This is Arthur's Chair and the ridge upon which it stands is Stone Arthur. Prominence is negligible, and other than the low outcrop itself, the "summit" is merely the point at which the gradient steepens markedly.

Between Stone Arthur and Heron Pike is the little valley of Greenhead Gill. This bears evidence of former mining activities, beginning at around 600 feet (180 m) above sea level with a trial. Further up the fellside are the remains of Grasmere Lead Mine. This was operated by the Mines Royal between 1564 and 1573 and there are several levels and shafts around the 1,000 feet (300 m) contour.

To the north west of Stone Arthur is the valley of Tongue Gill, separating it from the lower slopes of Seat Sandal. This side of the ridge is craggy with the main features being Brackenwife Knotts and Rigg Crags. Both Tongue and Greenhead Gills are tributaries of the River Rothay, which passes through Grasmere village to the lake of Grasmere. The lower slopes have been planted with areas of woodland.

== Geology ==
The summit tor is an example of the pebbly sandstone and breccia of the Pavey Ark Member.

== Summit ==
The summit of Stone Arthur is difficult to locate exactly amongst the upthrust rocks of Arthur's Chair. The view is excellent, particularly over Grasmere with Easedale Tarn showing across the valley.

== Ascents ==
Stone Arthur is most commonly ascended from a path turning left immediately after passing through the gate giving access to Greenhead Gill, repaired in recent years, this path rises steeply before crossing the breast of the fell below Stone Arthur, and recent the summit rocks from the south. The summit can also be reached from either side of the ridge. Beginning at Mill Bridge, Tongue Gill can be followed until the footbridge, before making a pathless ascent on grass. From Grasmere, climbing alongside Greenhead Gill also provides access, climbing until a contouring traverse to the summit can be made.
