= Nab Scar =

Mountain in the English Lake District, Cumbria, England

- Location within the Lake District

Highest point
- Elevation: 455 m (1,493 ft)
- Prominence: c. 5 m
- Parent peak: Heron Pike
- Listing: Wainwright
- Coordinates: 54°27′25″N 2°59′46″W

Geography
- Location: Cumbria, England
- Parent range: Lake District, Eastern Fells
- OS grid: NY356073
- Topo map: OS Explorer OL5, OL7

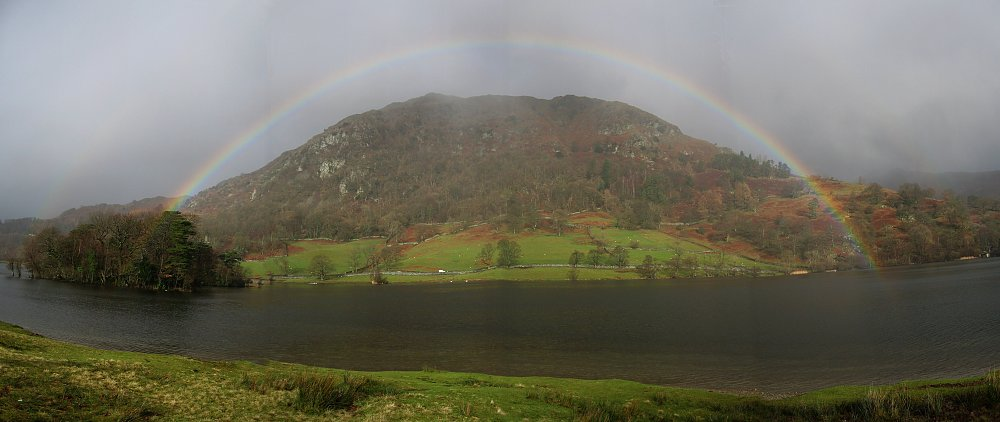
Nab Scar from Rydal Water with rainbow

Nab Scar is a fell in the English Lake District, an outlier of the Fairfield group in the Eastern Fells. It stands above Rydal Water.

== Topography ==
Nab Scar is properly the steep terminal face of the southern ridge of Heron Pike, but the name is also given to the whole of the ridge south of Lord Crag. Alfred Wainwright gave it the status of a separate fell in his Pictorial Guide to the Lakeland Fells and that convention is followed here.

The popular Fairfield horseshoe ridge walk either begins or ends with Nab Scar, consensus never having been achieved on the "correct" direction of travel. This route also takes in the additional Wainwrights of Heron Pike, Great Rigg, Fairfield, Hart Crag, Dove Crag, High Pike and Low Pike in a circuit of Rydale.

From the double summit of Heron Pike, a grassy ridge descends south westerly, gradually narrowing until a rougher section falls more steeply at Lord Crag. Beyond here it levels out, curving back a little to the east and passing over a couple of low mounds. The second of these is taken as the summit of Nab Scar. A few hundred yards further on is the scar itself, dropping steeply to the lake with woodland on the lower slopes. On the shore of the lake below the fell is Nab Cottage, past home to various of the Lake Poets. To the west is the little valley of Dunney Beck, separating Nab Scar from a low south western rigg running down from Heron Pike to Town End and the River Rothay. The eastern boundary of Nab Scar is the long, quiet valley of Rydale. All of these waters ultimately meet a Rydal village before turning south for Windermere.

A little to the west of the summit is Dockey Tarn, one of the smallest such bodies of water to be named on Ordnance Survey maps. This shallow, rocky bottomed pool has a fine colony of water starwort.

== Summit ==
The summit of Nab Scar bears a large cairn. The view westwards is extensive, with the Central Fells seen to particular effect.

== Ascents ==
The main route of ascent is via the recently repaired path up the ridge from Rydal village. A start can also be made from White Moss car park, climbing up Dunney Beck towards Alcock Tarn before swinging east onto the ridge.
