= High Hartsop Dodd =

Mountain in Cumbria, England

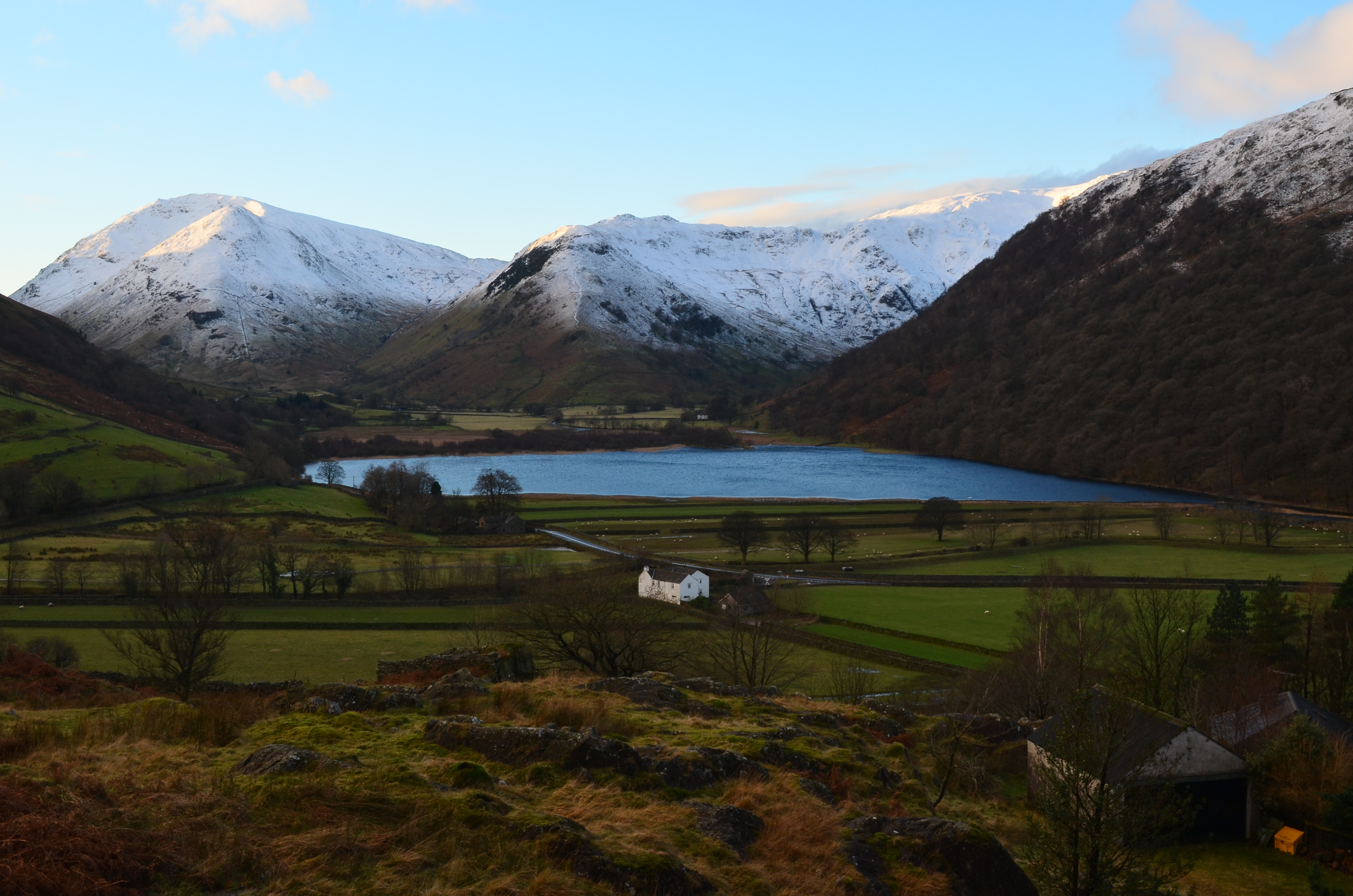
- High Hartsop Dodd (centre), with Little Hart Crag behind. Middle Dodd and Red Screes are left.

Highest point
- Elevation: 519 m (1,703 ft)
- Prominence: c. 5 m
- Parent peak: Little Hart Crag
- Listing: Wainwright
- Coordinates: 54°29′20″N 2°56′19″W

Geography
- Location within the Lake District
- Location: Cumbria, England
- Parent range: Lake District, Eastern Fells
- OS grid: NY393108
- Topo map: OS Explorer OL5

High Hartsop Dodd is a fell in the English Lake District, an outlier of the Fairfield group in the Eastern Fells. It stands above Kirkstone Pass on the road from Ullswater to Ambleside.

== Topography ==
High Hartsop Dodd is properly the north eastern ridge of Little Hart Crag, but was given the status of a separate fell by Alfred Wainwright in his Pictorial Guide to the Lakeland Fells and that convention is followed here. His decision was based on it having "the appearance of an isolated mountain with a peaked summit and steep sides, a very shapely pyramid rising from the green fields."

There are three Dodds when viewed from Hartsop, the others being (Low) Hartsop Dodd and Middle Dodd. The names refer to their position in the valley rather than their height. All three present an imposing pyramidal profile when seen from below, totally obscuring their parent fells. Similarly, all three appear entirely derivative when viewed from other angles.

From the rocky summit of Little Hart Crag a narrowing ridge descends north eastward on grass. The ground is quite wet and there are areas of peat and sedge. After half a mile of steady fall, the ridge throws up the barely perceptible summit of High Harsop Dodd. Beyond this the character of the fell changes completely and a steep slope plunges straight down to the valley floor.

The fell is bounded on either side by valleys of the Ullswater catchment. To the east is the narrow defile of Caiston Glen, falling from the summit of Scandale Pass. This separates the fell from Middle Dodd and its parent Red Screes. On the west is Hogget Gill, a sidestream of picturesque Dovedale. Across here is Stangs, a subsidiary top of Dove Crag. Dovedale and Caiston Glen are both tributaries of Kirkstone Beck, the main feeder of Brothers Water.

== Geology ==
Middle Dodd dacite forms the crest of the ridge with the volcaniclastic sandstone of the Esk Pike Formation beneath.

There is evidence of mining in Caiston Glen, with the mouth of a level opening about halfway up the beck. This was an unsuccessful trial for lead and extends about 80 ft into the fellside. There is a further small working nearby. According to Wainwright High Hartsop Dodd was briefly in the news in 1948 owing to efforts to save two terriers trapped in a hole on the Caiston flank.

== Summit ==
The summit of High Hartsop Dodd bears a small cairn at the point where the ridge briefly levels out. The view is not extensive given the high ring of surrounding fells, but many of these are seen in close detail, particularly Dove Crag.

== Ascents ==
High Hartsop Dodd is rarely climbed for its own sake, being merely a stop on the road to Little Hart Crag and Dove Crag. From here either Caiston Glen or Dovedale can be circumnavigated along fine high level ridges. The nose of the fell provides the only practicable route, starting from either Kirkstonefoot or Cow Bridge. This is grassy and rather steep.
