= Low Pike =

Mountain in Cumbria, England

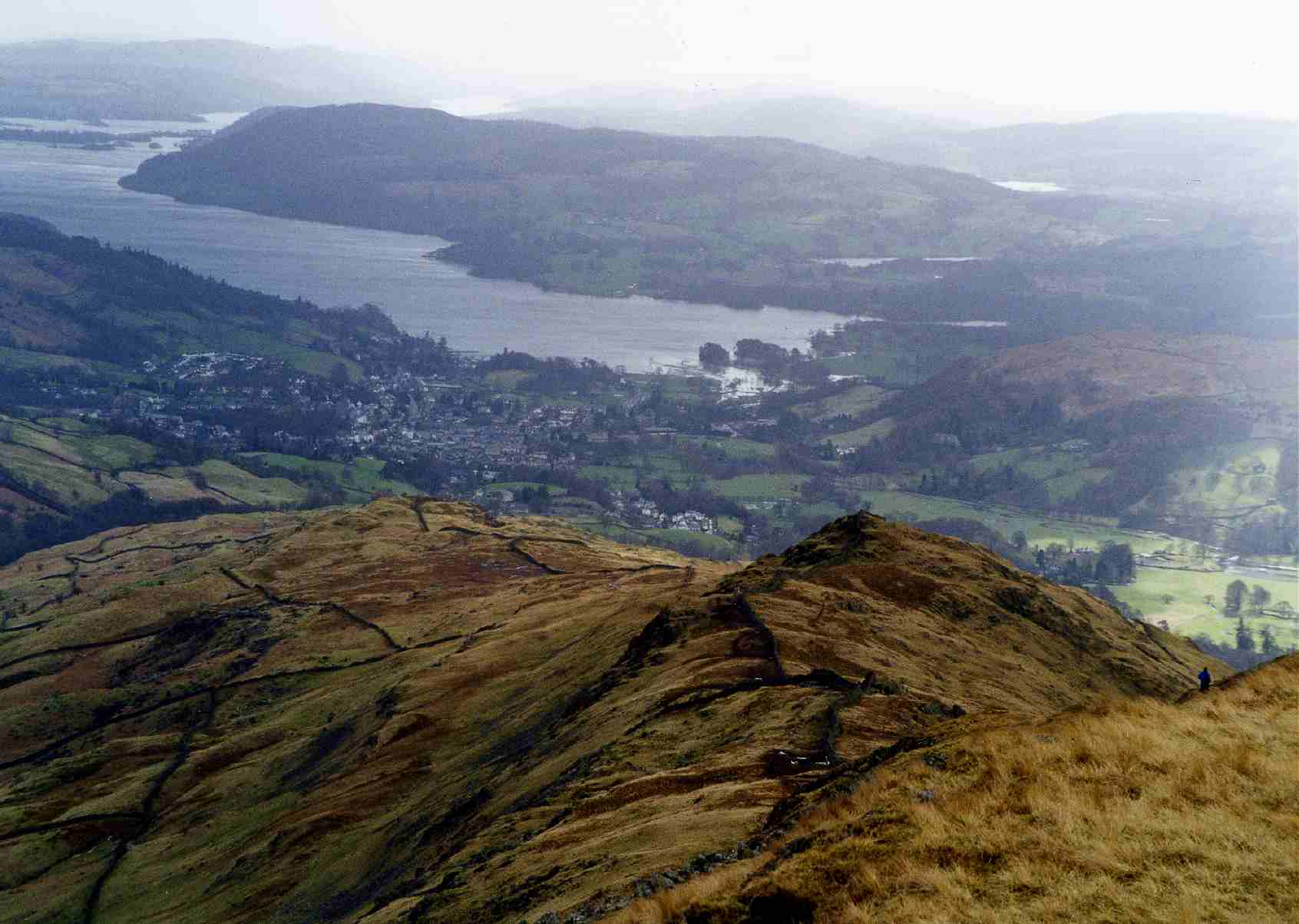
- Low Pike seen from High Pike, one kilometre to the north. Ambleside and Windermere lake are in the background.

Highest point
- Elevation: 508 m (1,667 ft)
- Prominence: 28 m (92 ft)
- Parent peak: Dove Crag
- Listing: Wainwright
- Coordinates: 54°27′39″N 2°58′07″W

Geography
- Location within the Lake District
- Location: Cumbria, England
- Parent range: Lake District, Eastern Fells
- OS grid: NY373077
- Topo map: OS Landranger 90 OS Explorer 7

Low Pike is a small fell in the English Lake District. It has a modest height of 508 m (1,667 ft) and is situated three kilometres north of Ambleside. Low Pike is well seen from the streets of the town as the first prominent fell on the ridge which continues northwards for a further four kilometres to Fairfield. This ridge is part of the Fairfield horseshoe walk and Low Pike is most commonly ascended as part of this.

== Topography ==
Despite its modest height, Alfred Wainwright gave Low Pike a separate chapter in his Pictorial Guide to the Lakeland Fells because "it is sufficiently elevated above the deep valleys of Scandale and Rydale to give an impression of loftiness which exaggerates its modest altitude." Bill Birkett also mentions the fell in his “Complete Lakeland Fells”, but its altitude is not sufficient to be noted on any other mountain lists.

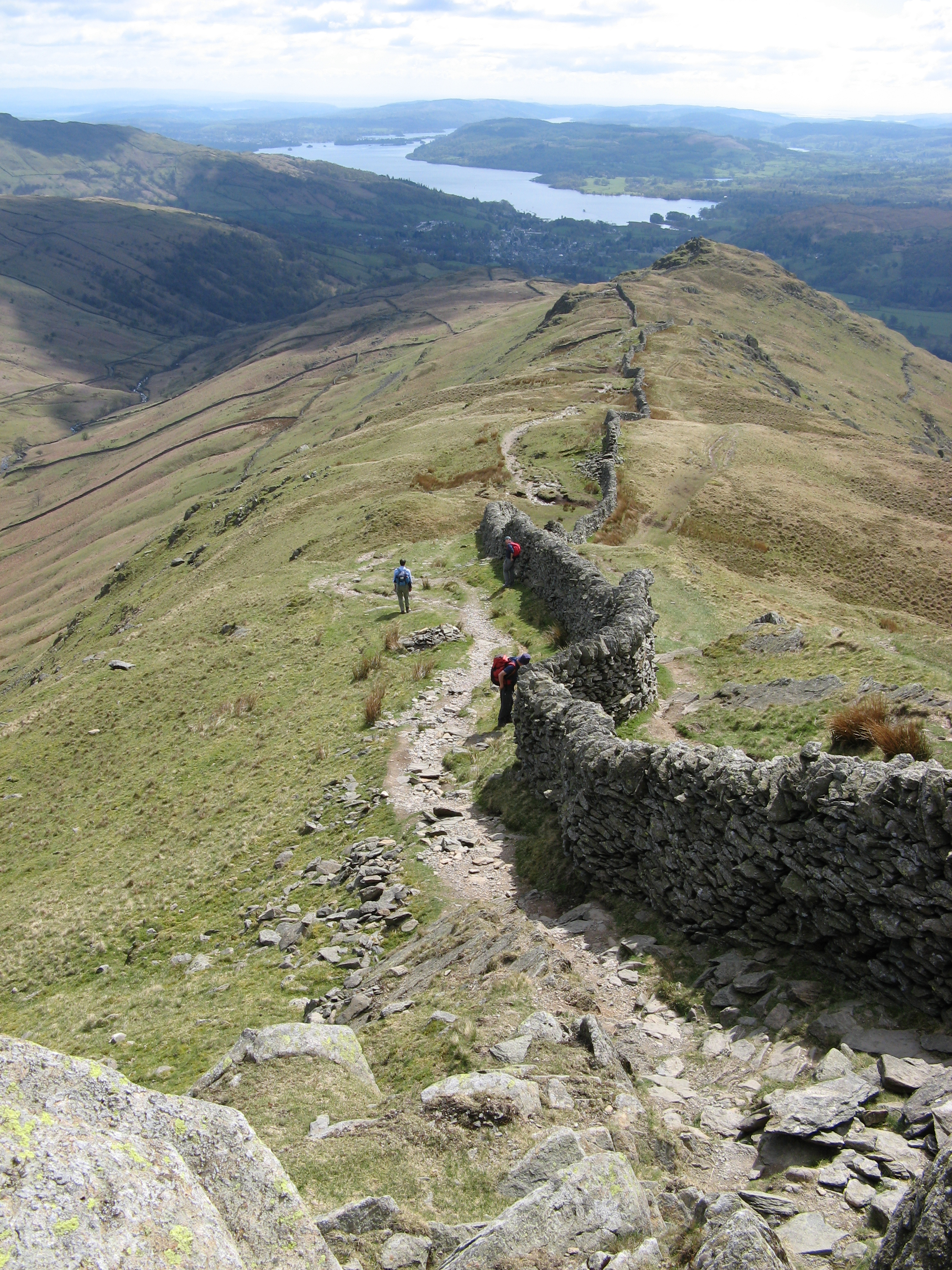
Low Pike from the descent from High Pike.

== Geology ==
The crest of the ridge consists of the dacitic welded lapilli tuff of the Lincomb Tarns Formation. Andesite sills surround this.

== Ascents ==
The direct ascent from Ambleside is straightforward. A signpost points to Low Sweden Bridge from the centre of Ambleside; after reaching the bridge and crossing the Scandale Beck a high dry-stone wall is followed for two kilometres along the spine of the ridge to reach the summit. A visit to High Sweden Bridge may be incorporated at the start of this walk; it is a typical Cumbrian Packhorse bridge. It has no direct Scandinavian connection except that its name comes from the Norse word ‘svithinn’ which means “land cleared by burning”. Most walkers who climb Low Pike continue to the adjoining fells of the Fairfield Horseshoe–High Pike, Dove Crag, Hart Crag, Fairfield, Great Rigg and Heron Pike–before returning to Ambleside.

== Summit ==
The top of the fell is a small rocky peak which requires a bit of scrambling; the stone wall goes directly over the peak giving no room for a cairn of any size. The view is restricted by surrounding higher fells but the Langdale and Coniston fells show well over the low ground at the head of Windermere; there is also a good aerial view of Ambleside and the head of Windermere lake.
