= Dockey Tarn =

Tarn in Cumbria, England

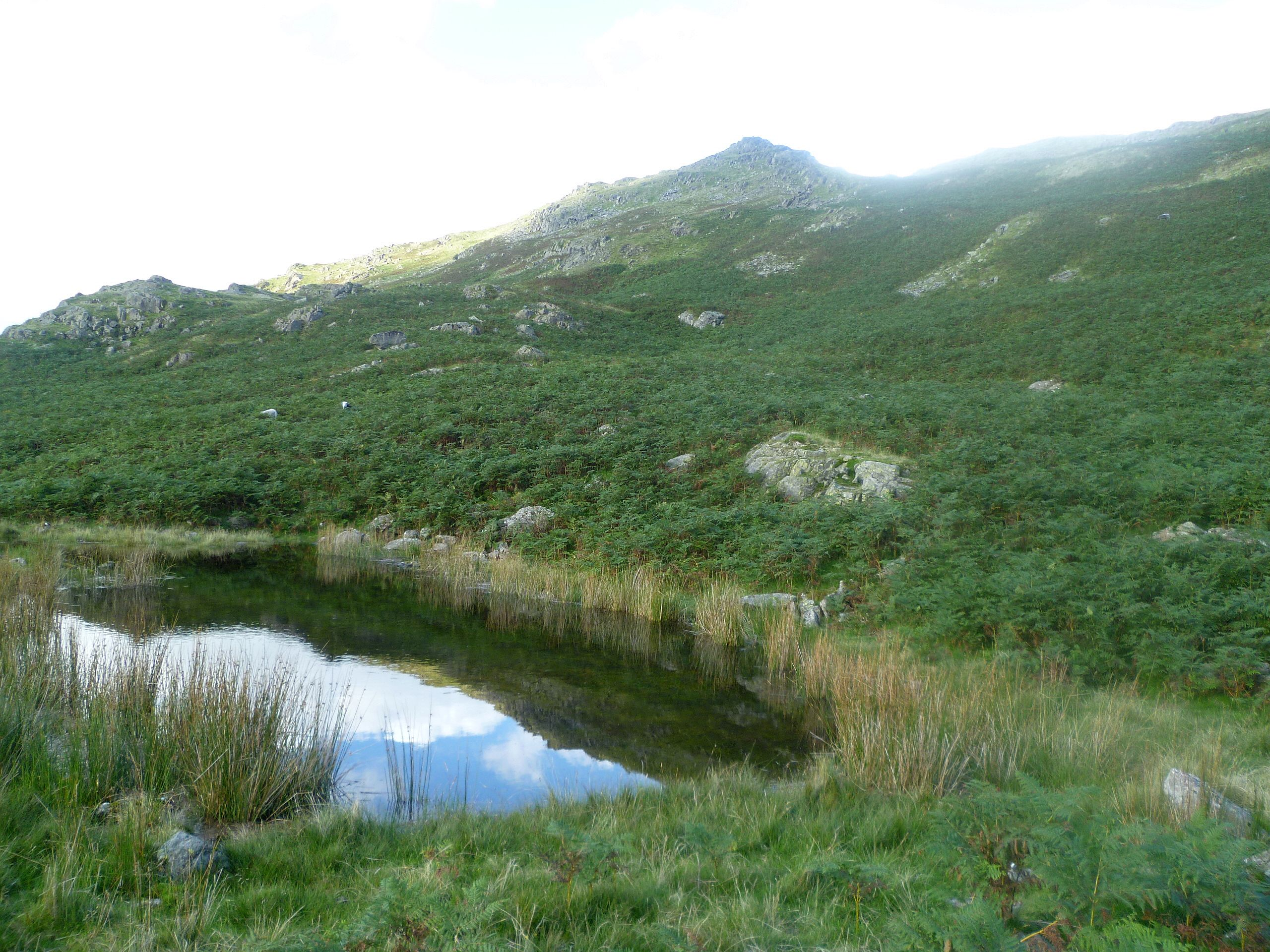
- Dockey Tarn in 2012

- Location within Cumbria
- Location: Cumbria, England
- Coordinates: 54.4569°N 2.9989°W
- Type: Lake
- Surface elevation: 379.3 metres (1,244 ft)

Dockey Tarn is a small lake in Westmorland and Furness district, Cumbria, England. It is located at a height of 379.3 m (1,244 ft), on the west slope below the ridge from Nab Scar to Heron Pike, about 700 m (2,300 ft) south-east of Alcock Tarn, and about 2 km (1.2 mi) east of Grasmere. It has been said to be one of the smallest tarns in the Lake District which is named on Ordnance Survey maps; it does not appear on their maps at 1:50,000 scale but is marked and named on their 1:25,000 maps.

A visitor in 2018 reported that the tarn had at that time dried up completely.

The name of the tarn appeared in a 1749 document spelled "Dockrey Tarn", and is believed to derive from the local family surname Dockray.
