= Middle Dodd =

Mountain in Cumbria, England

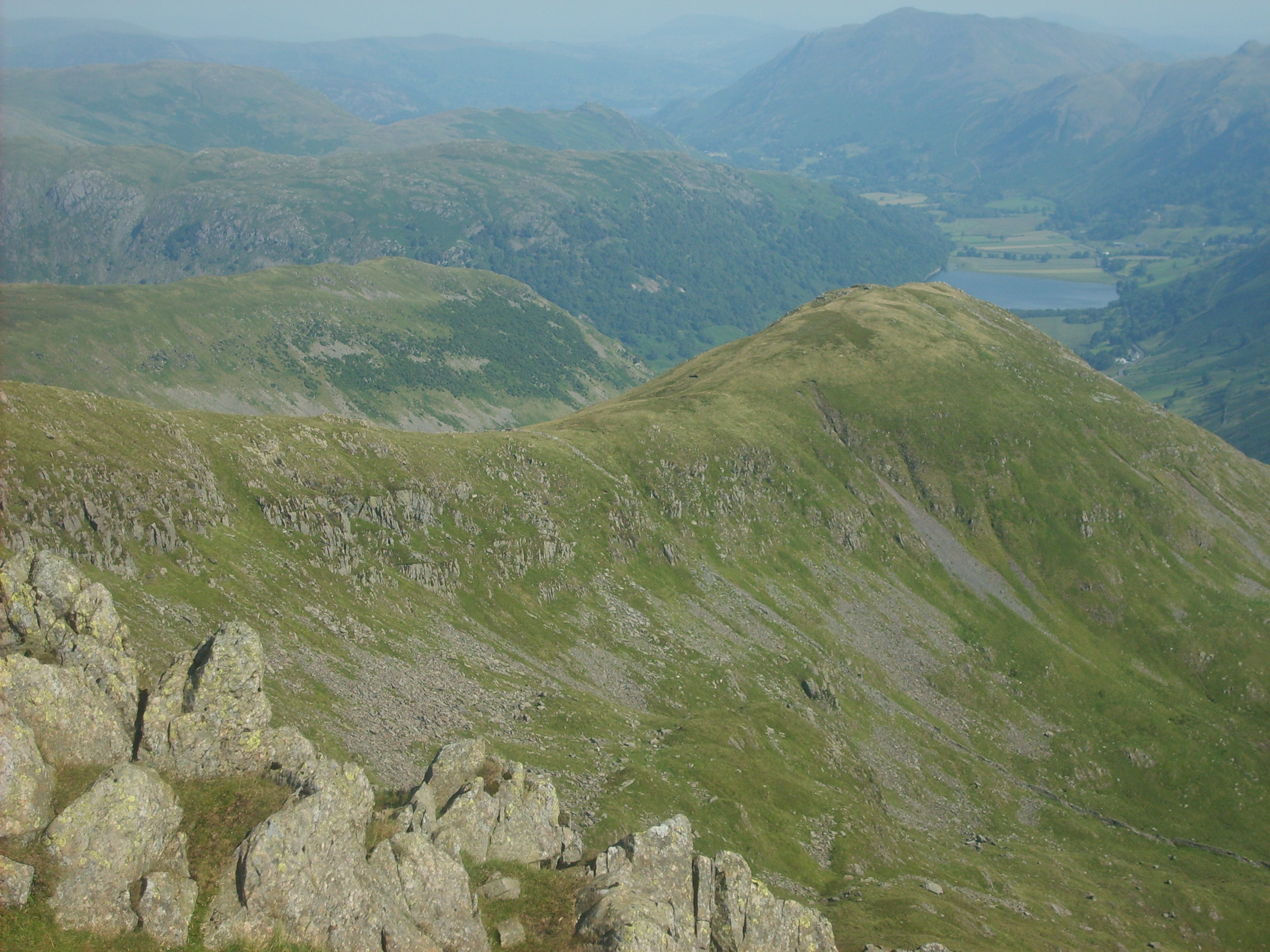
- Middle Dodd, with Brothers Water beyond, from Red Screes

Highest point
- Elevation: 654 m (2,146 ft)
- Prominence: c. 10 metres (30 ft)
- Parent peak: Red Screes
- Listing: Wainwright
- Coordinates: 54°28′41″N 2°55′56″W

Geography
- Location within the Lake District
- Location: Cumbria, England
- Parent range: Lake District, Eastern Fells
- OS grid: NY397096
- Topo map: OS Explorer OL5, OL7

Middle Dodd is a fell in the English Lake District, an outlier of the Helvellyn range in the Eastern Fells. It stands above Kirkstone Pass on the road from Ullswater to Ambleside.

== Topography ==
Middle Dodd is properly the northern ridge of Red Screes, but was given the status of a separate fell by Alfred Wainwright in his Pictorial Guide to the Lakeland Fells and that convention is followed here. His decision was based on its being "…the most striking object in a fine array of mountain scenery…"

The fell is named as the middle one of three Dodds when viewed from Hartsop, the others being (Low) Hartsop Dodd and High Hartsop Dodd. The names thus refer to position in the valley rather than height. All three present an imposing pyramidal profile when seen from below, totally obscuring their parent fells. Similarly, all three appear entirely derivative when viewed from other angles.

From the wide summit of Red Screes a narrowing ridge curves northward, passing around the rim of a cove on the Kirkstone side. The ridge, named Smallthwaite Band, narrows to a fine grassy promenade and then throws up the summit of Middle Dodd. Beyond this the character of the fell changes completely and a rough slope plunges straight down to the valley floor, 1,500 feet (460 m) below.

The fell is bounded on either side by valleys of the Ullswater catchment. To the east is Kirkstone Beck, flowing from the summit of the pass with its famous inn. On the west is Caiston Glen, its beck descending from the walker's crossroads of Scandale Pass. These valleys meet beneath the nose of Middle Dodd and continue northward to Brothers Water.

== Geology ==
Middle Dodd dacite forms the crest of the ridge, lying above the volcaniclastic laminated claystones and siltstone of the Esk Pike Formation.

There is evidence of mining in Caiston Glen, with the mouth of a level opening about halfway up the beck. This was an unsuccessful trial for lead and extends about 80 feet (25 m) into the fellside. There is a further small working nearby. There are also the remains of a trial for copper on the eastern flank of Middle Dodd, a 120 feet (35 m) level being driven into the fell from close to the modern road.

== Summit ==
The summit of Middle Dodd bears a small cairn on a top. There is also a trench here of uncertain origin. The view is good given the presence of Red Screes, with a vista of the Scafells completing the picture.

== Ascents ==
Middle Dodd is rarely climbed for its own sake, being merely a stop on the road to Red Screes. The nose of the fell provides the obvious route, starting from either Kirkstonefoot or Cow Bridge. This is unremittingly steep, but even harsher gradients can be found by making a pathless ascent from Red Pit on the Kirkstone road. A direct route contouring from Scandale Pass is also possible, but most would proceed via Red Screes from this point.
