= Great Rigg =

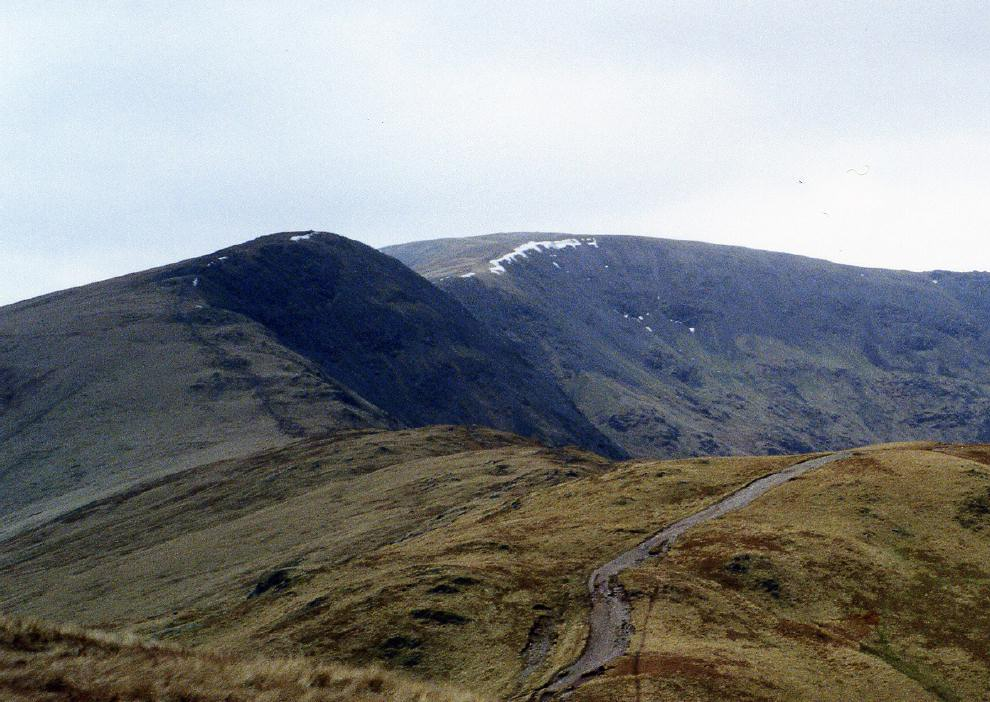
- Great Rigg (left) with Fairfield behind from Heron Pike.

Highest point
- Elevation: 766 m (2,513 ft)
- Prominence: 31 m (102 ft)
- Parent peak: Fairfield
- Listing: Hewitt, Nuttall, Wainwright
- Coordinates: 54°29′05″N 2°59′50″W

Geography
- Location within the Lake District
- Location: Cumbria, England
- Parent range: Lake District Eastern Fells
- OS grid: NY355104
- Topo map: OS Landranger 90, OS Explorer 5

Great Rigg is a fell in the English Lake District, 7 kilometres (4 1/4 miles) north-west of Ambleside and reaching a height of 766 metres (2,510 foot). It is most often climbed as part of the Fairfield horseshoe, a 16-km circular walk which starts and finishes in Ambleside. The fell's name originates from the Old English "Rigg", meaning a bumpy or knobbly ridge.

== Topography ==
Great Rigg is mostly without merit, being just an undulation on one of Fairfield's southern ridges; with 31 metres (102 ft) of prominence it just qualifies as a Hewitt. It is best seen from the south-west near Grasmere where from that angle its summit seems to dominate the valley.

The fell is rocky on its eastern side as Stone Cove drops to Rydal Beck; on its western flank it is mostly grassy as it falls away to Tongue Gill; to the north and south are ridges which continue to other fells, with Fairfield being 1.5 kilometres (0.9 miles) away to the north while Heron Pike lies 2.5 kilometres (1.6 miles) to the south. There is a third less significant ridge going south-west towards Grasmere which has the ‘Wainwright’ fell of Stone Arthur on its shoulder overlooking Grasmere.

== Geology ==
Volcaniclastic sandstone of the Esk Pike Formation makes up the summit area. Beneath is the dacitic lapilli tuff of the Lincomb Tarns Formation.

== Ascents ==
As mentioned Great Rigg is usually climbed as part of the Fairfield horseshoe (Fairfield lies close by to the north). However, a direct ascent of sorts can be done from Grasmere up the south-west ridge taking in Stone Arthur on the way. This walk can be continued to Fairfield and Seat Sandal before returning to Grasmere to complete a 10 km (6 mi) circular walk.

== Summit ==
The summit is crowned by a substantial cairn, which is named on large-scale maps as Greatrigg Man. There are good views of the Lakeland mountains to the west, a distinctive feature of the outlook being the large number of lakes and tarns that are in view, with ten sizeable bodies of water well seen.
