= Fairfield horseshoe =

Hillwalking route in the Lake District, England

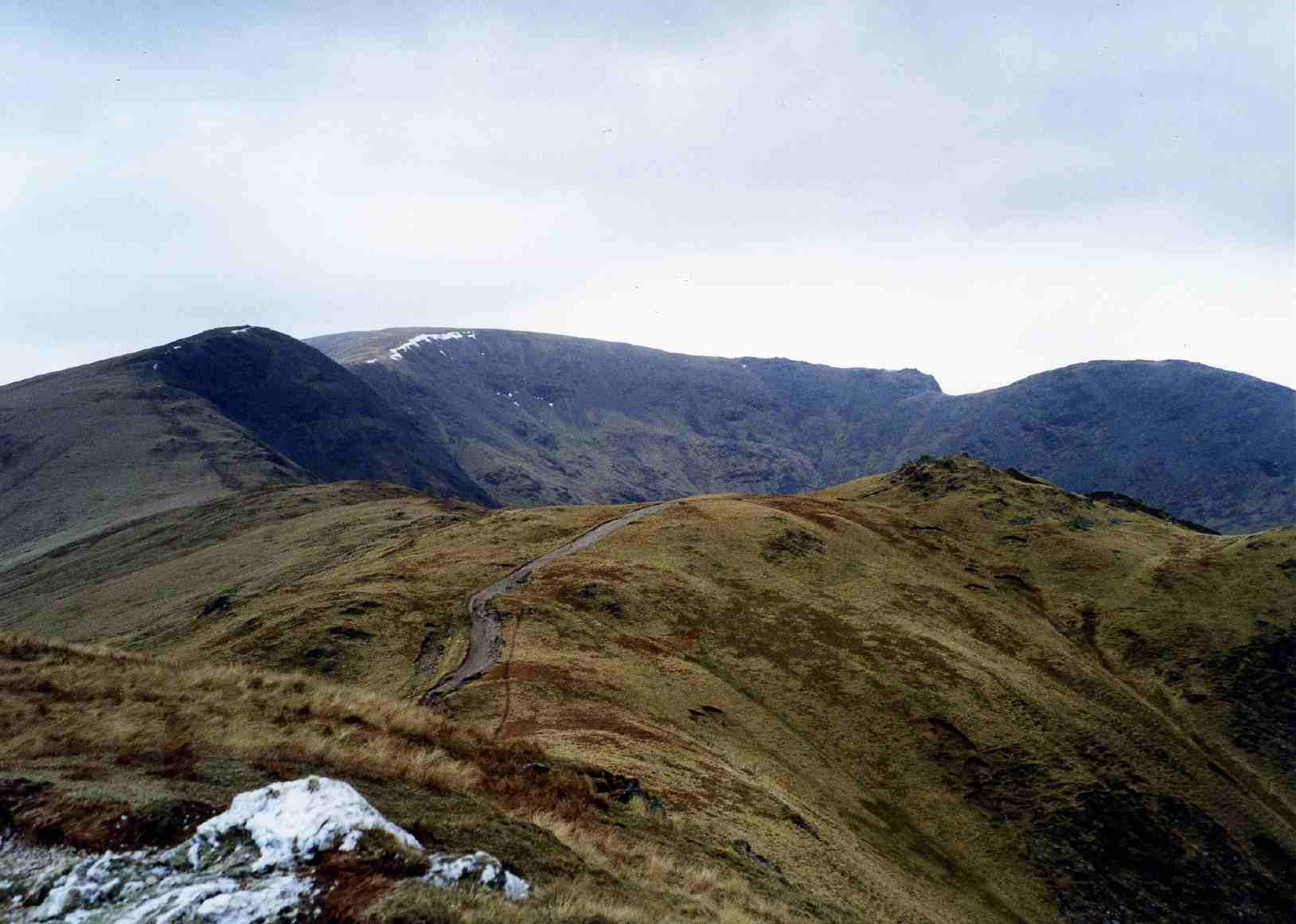
Part of the Fairfield Horseshoe seen from Heron Pike with Great Rigg, Fairfield and Hart Crag in view.

Fairfield Horseshoe is a classic circular hillwalking ridge walk route starting from Rydal or Ambleside in the English Lake District that takes in all the fells that surround the valley of the Rydal Beck.

== The round ==
The walk is extremely popular and follows well defined paths throughout with no real difficulties; however, care should be taken on the summit of Fairfield in poor visibility as the plateau of that mountain is very flat and can be quite confusing, with the danger of steep drops to the north and west. The eastern side of the horseshoe from Low Sweden Bridge near Ambleside to the slopes of Hart Crag follows a high dry stone wall, covering some six kilometres, making navigation simple even in poor weather conditions.

One of Wainwright’s favourite ridge walks, the round was described by him as “a great horseshoe of grassy slopes below a consistently high skyline, simple in design and impressive in altitude”. Contrary to his normal practice, Wainwright recommended doing the walk anti-clockwise, beginning with Low Pike.

The horseshoe walk is a 16 kilometre journey with 1100 metres of ascent and includes the peaks of:

- Low Pike (508 metres) 54.460789°N 2.96874°W
- High Pike (656 metres)
- Dove Crag (792 metres)
- Hart Crag (822 metres)
- Fairfield (873 metres) 54.46079°N 2.96874°W
- Great Rigg (766 metres) 54.46079°N 2.96874°W
- Heron Pike (612 metres)
- Nab Scar (440 metres) 54.46079°N 2.96874°W

== Fell race ==
There is a Fairfield Horseshoe Fell Race, which takes place annually in May, first organised by the Lake District Mountain Trial Association in 1966. This fell race is over 14 kilometres long with over 900 metres of ascent. The men's course record was set by Jacob Adkin in 2021 with a time of 1:14:45. The women's record is 1:27:15, set by Victoria Wilkinson in 2013.

== See also ==
- Coledale round
