= Heron Pike =

Mountain in Cumbria, England

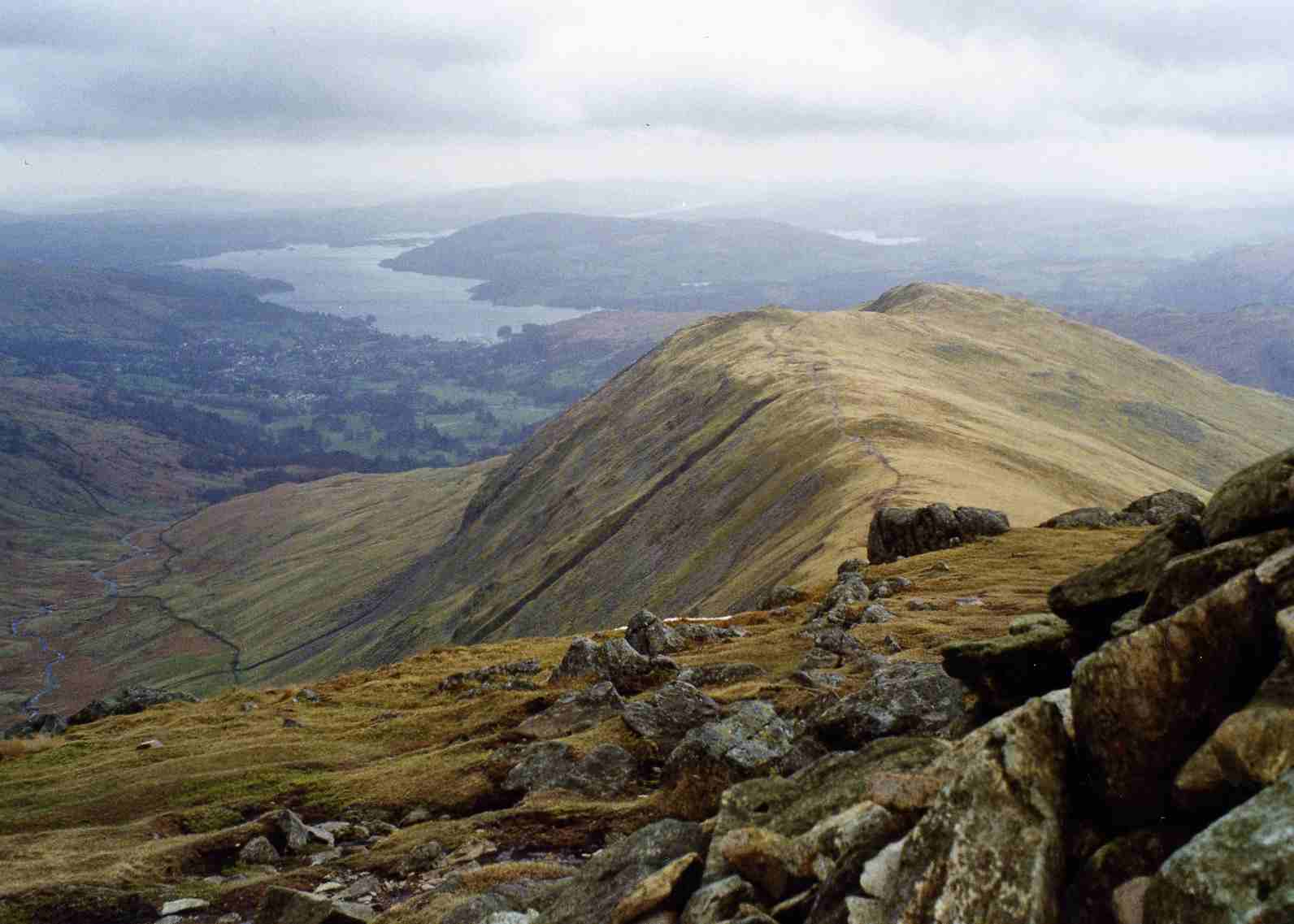
- Heron Pike seen from Great Rigg, two kilometres to the north. Windermere is seen in the distance.

Highest point
- Elevation: 612 m (2,008 ft)
- Prominence: 21 m (69 ft)
- Parent peak: Great Rigg
- Listing: Nuttall, Wainwright
- Coordinates: 54°27′54″N 2°59′48″W

Geography
- Location within the Lake District
- Location: Cumbria, England
- Parent range: Lake District Eastern Fells
- OS grid: NY355082
- Topo map: OS Landranger 90 OS Explorer 7

Listed summits of Heron Pike
Name	Grid ref	Height	Status
Heron Pike North Top	NY357086	621 m (2,037 ft)	Nuttall

Heron Pike is a fell in the English Lake District, two kilometres east of Grasmere. It is part of the Fairfield group in the Eastern Fells. It should not be confused with the Heron Pike that forms part of Sheffield Pike, although it appears that, by coincidence, both Heron Pikes are exactly the same height.

== Topography ==
Heron Pike is a slight grassy rise on the long southern ridge of its parent fell Fairfield. Just cresting the 2,000 foot mark at 612 m (2,008 ft), it is mostly climbed as part of the Fairfield horseshoe walk and it lies between the adjoining fells of Nab Scar and Great Rigg. Heron Pike’s eastern side features Erne Crag and Blind Cove as it falls away quite steeply towards Rydal Beck. At the base of Erne Crag is an old quarry, the mouth of a cavern quite easy to locate.

The fell's western flank drops towards Grasmere and has the small Alcock Tarn on its lower slopes at a height of 360 m (1,180 ft). Alcock Tarn was originally known as Butter Crags Tarn and was enlarged by means of a stone and earth dam in the nineteenth century to a depth of about six feet (2 m). The owner, a Mr Alcock of Grasmere, then stocked it with brown trout.

Heron Pike has a "subsidiary" top which qualifies as a Nuttall. It is called Heron Pike North Top on the Nuttall lists, but is also known as Rydal Fell in some guide books. It lies 400 metres (1/4 mile) north of the main summit at the top of Erne Crag and has a height of 621 m (2,037 ft). The deliberate choice by Alfred Wainwright of the lower top to be the summit in his Pictorial Guide to the Lakeland Fells is one of the many oddities which differentiate Wainwrights from more logical hill lists such as Nuttalls or Hewitts.

== Geology ==
The ridgeline exposes the dacitic welded lapilli tuff of the Lincomb Tarns Formation.

== Ascents ==
Ascents of the fell are commenced either from Rydal or Grasmere; the ascent from Grasmere allows Alcock Tarn to be visited by a short detour while the route from Rydal first climbs Nab Scar. However, the majority of walkers who visit Heron Pike do so either on the way to or on the way back from the main fell of Fairfield.

== Summit ==
The south summit has flashes of quartz in the uppermost rock. Heron Pike provides a fine vista of Windermere, the Coniston and Central Fells. The higher northern top bears the remains of a cross wall, some of this fashioned into a small cairn.
