= Alcock Tarn =

Tarn in Cumbria, England

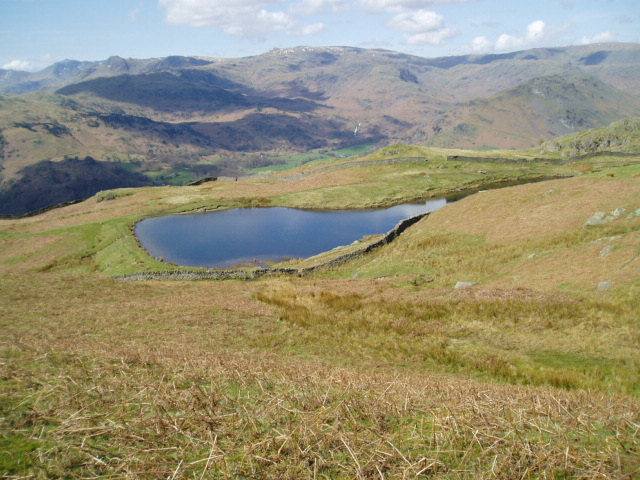

- Location within Cumbria
- Location: Cumbria, England
- Coordinates: 54°27′44″N 3°0′20″W
- Type: Lake

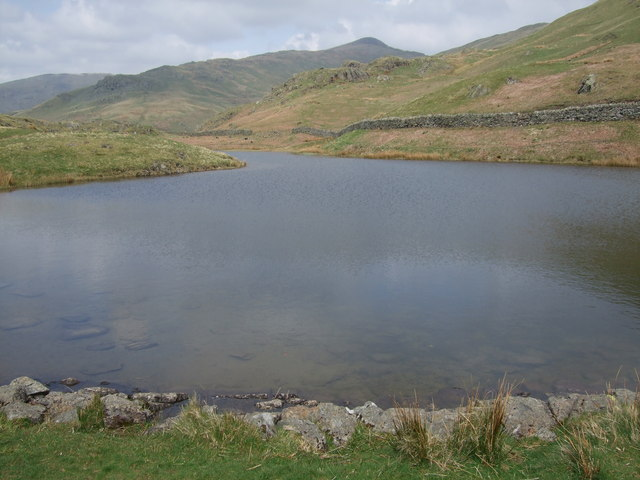

Alcock Tarn is a lake in Westmorland and Furness, Cumbria, England. It is located high in the fells on Heron Pike, roughly a mile and a half east of Grasmere.

Alcock Tarn was originally known as Butter Crags Tarn and was enlarged by means of a stone and earth dam in the 19th century to a depth of about 6 ft (1.8 m). The owner, a Mr Alcock of Grasmere, then stocked it with brown trout.
