= High Pike (Scandale) =

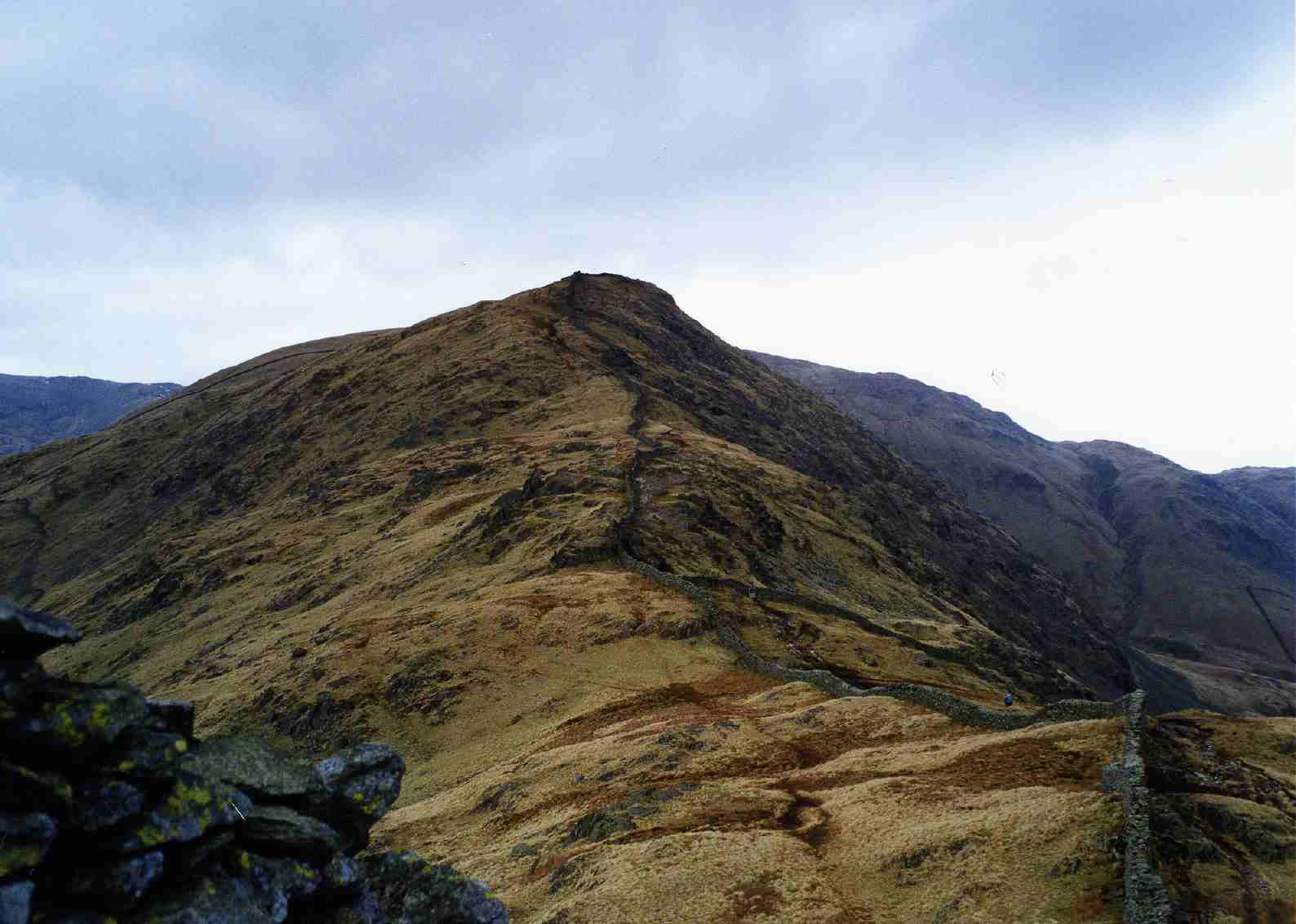
- Looking up to High Pike from Low Pike.

Highest point
- Elevation: 656 m (2,152 ft)
- Prominence: c. 5 metres (16 ft)
- Parent peak: Dove Crag
- Listing: Wainwright
- Coordinates: 54°28′12″N 2°58′05″W

Geography
- Location within the Lake District
- Location: Cumbria, England
- Parent range: Lake District, Eastern Fells
- OS grid: NY373088
- Topo map: OS Landranger 90 OS Explorer 7

High Pike is a fell in the English Lake District, located five kilometres north of Ambleside. Situated in the Eastern Fells, it can be confused with another Lake District High Pike in the Northern Fells. High Pike reaches a height of 656 metres (2,152 ft). It is sometimes referred to as Scandale Fell, although this name really only applies to the high ground at the head of Scandale.

== Topography ==
When viewed from the south around High Sweden bridge near Ambleside, High Pike has the look of a remote peak standing alone with cliffs falling away from the summit on its eastern side. However, in reality it is just a slight rise on the long southern ridge of Dove Crag with only about five metres of prominence which prevents it even qualifying as a “Nuttall”; nevertheless both Alfred Wainwright and Bill Birkett mention the fell in their books on the Lakeland Fells.

== Geology ==
The crest of the ridge consists of the volcaniclastic laminated claystone and siltstone of the Esk Pike Formation. Beneath is the dacitic welded lapilli tuff of the Lincomb Tarns Formation.

== Ascents ==
High Pike is often climbed as part of the Fairfield horseshoe walk. The ascent from Ambleside leaves the centre of the town northerly and goes by Low Sweden Bridge to reach the open fell where a sizeable dry stone wall is followed firstly over Low Pike and then down to a depression at 480 m (1,570 ft) before climbing to the flat grassy summit of High Pike with its cairn standing on the edge of crags overlooking Scandale.

== Summit ==
Much of the view from the top is curtailed by higher fells but there is a view of the Far Eastern Fells over the Scandale Pass and an excellent view of Ambleside and the head of Windermere.
