= Rydal Beck =

Stream in Westmorland and Furness, England

Coordinates: 54°27′N 2°59′W

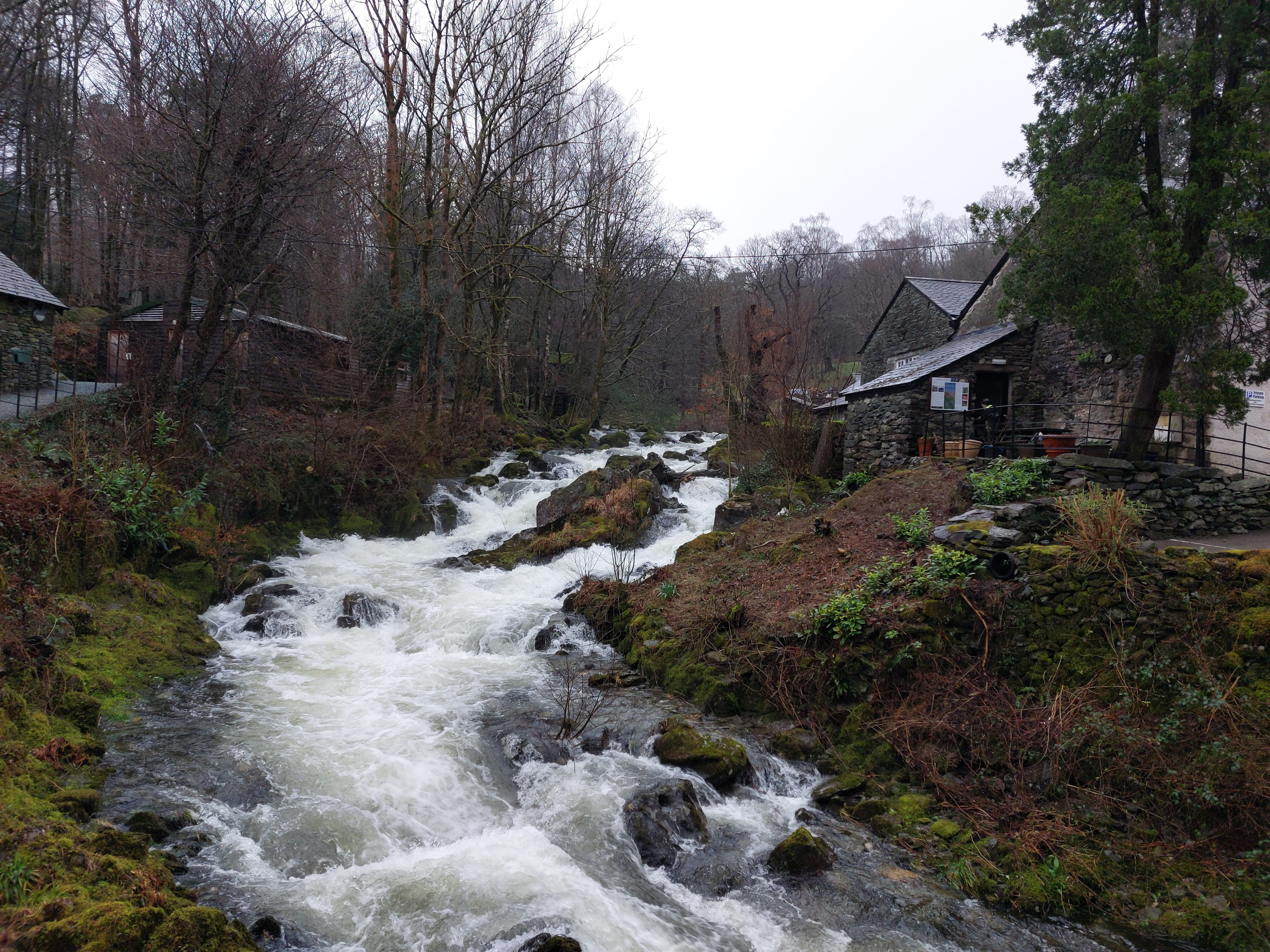
Rydal Beck near Rydal Hall

Rydal Beck is a stream in Westmorland and Furness which runs into the River Rothay near the village of Rydal. It is noted for its scenic waterfalls, celebrated in verse by William Wordsworth and depicted by John Constable, Joseph Wright of Derby and others. The largely 17th-century Rydal Hall stands alongside it.

== Course ==
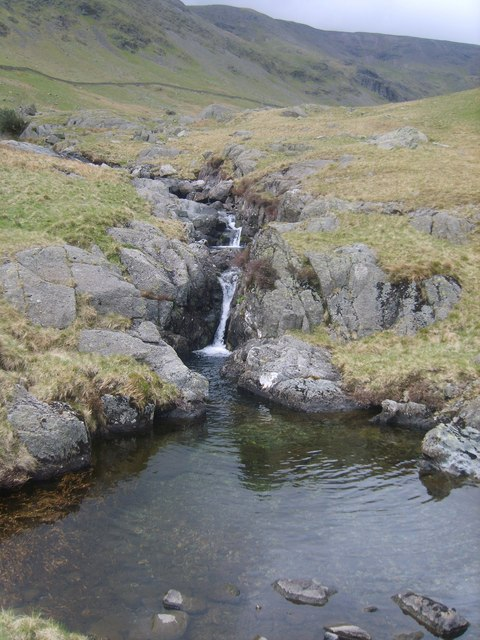
Unnamed waterfalls on the upper stretch of the beck

Rydal Beck runs about four miles, in a generally southerly direction throughout, from a point a little to the east of Fairfield's summit down to the River Rothay.

It rises on the southern slopes of the depression between Fairfield and Hart Crag and descends steeply for a short distance before the slope begins to flatten out. It then flows for about two miles at a very slight rate of descent subsuming small becks from both sides, only one of which, Groove Beck, is named on Ordnance Survey 1:25000 maps. It then descends rather more steeply through the wooded area called Birk Hagg and the gardens of Rydal Hall. In this stretch it forms waterfalls at several points, notably the 6-metre single drop at High Fall in Birk Hagg and again Low Fall near Rydal Hall. Reaching the plain of the Rothay valley it passes under the A591 at Rydal Bridge, then empties into the River Rothay.

== Toponymy ==
The name of Rydal village is first recorded in 1240 in the form Ridale. It derives from Old English ryge 'rye' and Old Norse dalr 'valley'. The beck is named as Caw-weel in a document of 1668, and as Rydale-Beck in James Clarke's A Survey of the Lakes of Cumberland, Westmorland, and Lancashire (1787). Beck is a word derived from Old Norse bekk-r 'brook, rivulet'. The valley of the beck has no name on Ordnance Survey maps, though Alfred Wainwright called it Rydale.

== History ==
Rydal Beck figured, without being named, on a map of north-west England produced by the German cartographer Gerardus Mercator and first published in 1595. It also appeared on maps published by Jan Janssonius of Amsterdam in 1646 and John Ogilby of London in 1675. Rydal Hall was built on its present site, next to the beck's Low Fall, by Michael Fleming in 1600. In the second half of the 17th century his son Daniel greatly expanded the hall and built a picturesque garden incorporating a single-span stone bridge over Rydal Beck and a summer house intended to provide views of the waterfall. This summer house, called "The Grot", became a noted attraction as the Lake District became popular with tourists.

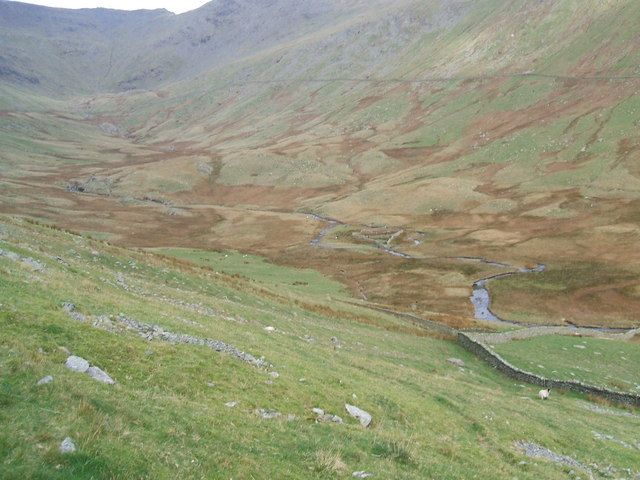
The upper valley

Perhaps the first writer to draw public attention to Low Fall was the 18th-century poet William Mason, who wrote that "Here Nature has performed every Thing in little that she usually executes on her larger Scale...the little central Stream dashing down a Cleft of the darkest-coloured Stone, produces an Effect of Light and Shadow beautiful beyond Description." Robert Southey, in his 1803 Letters from England, described a walk from Ambleside to Grasmere ("a more beautiful one perhaps is not to be found in the wide world") in which the Low and High Falls figured, the lower one, seen from The Grot, being "of so singular a character that it may be imagined from description". The young John Stuart Mill, touring the Lakes in 1831, enthused about Rydal Beck, calling it "the finest specimen of its kind which I ever saw". He continued:

The bed, or trough through which it rushes, seems as if it had been chiselled several feet deep in the living rock; the sides of the ghyll are green, and richly wooded, but over the stream the rock is laid bare, & shows itself in crags above & slabs & fragments below, superior in wildness to everything I have seen of this class. The falls are only in a stream of this character like the most brilliant passages in a fine piece of music. The stream is all waterfalls.

Wordsworth, who lived within sight of Rydal Beck, remarked in the 1835 edition of his Guide to the Lakes that "The Waterfalls of Rydal are pointed out to every one." He depicted the beck in his poems An Evening Walk, "Lyre! though such power do in thy magic live", and "To M. H.". His son-in-law Edward Quillinan celebrated the same subject in his poem, "Rydal-Beck, Westmoreland".

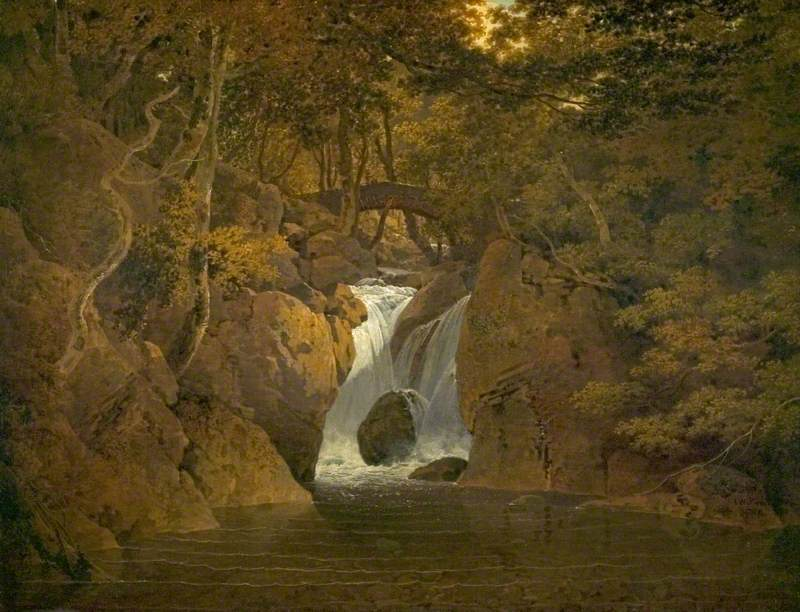
Joseph Wright of Derby Rydal Lower Fall, 1795.

In the 1950s Alfred Wainwright called the upper stretches of the valley of Rydal Beck an attractive and interesting approach to a steep ascent of Hart Crag, noting that they were then "remarkably quiet and unfrequented". Today, the gardens of Rydal Hall, within which Low Fall lies, are still privately owned land, but public access is allowed from 10.00 till 16.00. The Upper Falls, which lie in Birk Haggs Access Area, can be reached by footpath, and public footpaths lead to the ridges on both sides of the valley.

== In art ==
For many years the waterfalls on Rydal Beck were a favourite subject for the sketchbooks of Lake District tourists. Joseph Farington's The Lower Waterfall at Rydal, Westmorland has been dated as early as 1776–1781. Joseph Wright of Derby produced an oil painting, Rydal Lower Fall, in 1795; Julius Caesar Ibbetson another oil painting, Lower Rydal Waterfall, in 1798; and John Constable a pencil drawing, Rydal Falls, in 1806. Further paintings and drawings of the waterfalls and other locations on the beck are known by, among others, George Barrett Sr., Henry Inman, John Frederick Kensett, John Berney Ladbrooke, Francis Nicholson, John Skinner Prout, James Baker Pyne (an uncertain attribution), John Rathbone, and Francis Towne.
