= Dove Crag =

Fell in the English Lake District

Dove Crags
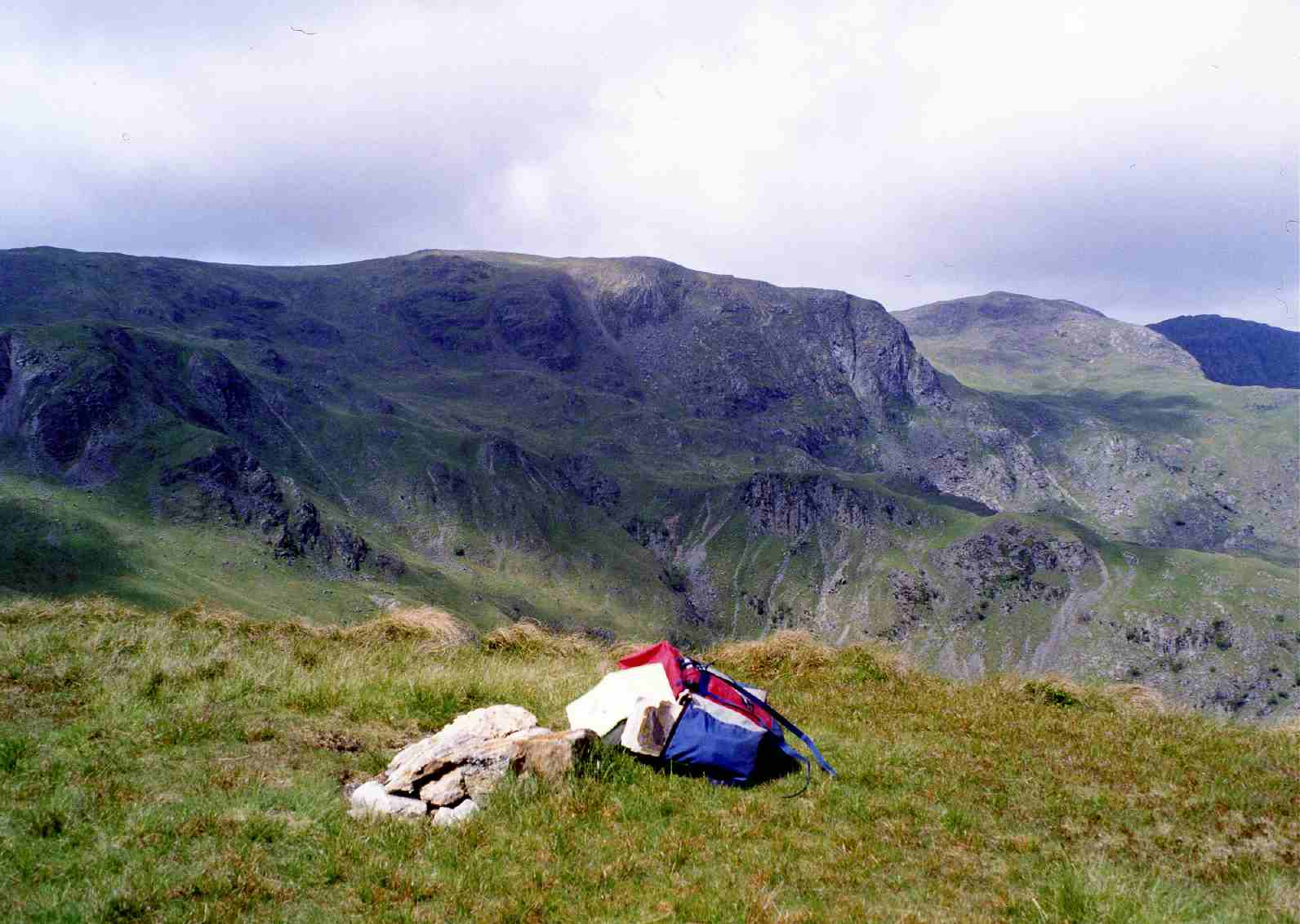
- Dove Crag from High Hartsop Dodd, 2 km to the east

Highest point
- Elevation: 792 m (2,598 ft)
- Prominence: 50 m (160 ft)
- Parent peak: Hart Crag
- Listing: Hewitt, Wainwright, Nuttall
- Coordinates: 54°29′06″N 2°58′04″W

Geography
- Location within the Lake District
- Location: Cumbria, England
- Parent range: Lake District, Eastern Fells
- OS grid: NY374104
- Topo map: OS Landranger 90 OS Explorer Outdoor Leisure 5, 7

Dove Crag is a fell in the English Lake District. Situated in the Eastern Fells of the national park, seven kilometres south-south-west of Glenridding, it reaches a height of 792 metres (2,598 feet). The fell is often climbed as part of the Fairfield horseshoe walk but a direct ascent from Patterdale is required to show the fell's full potential, displaying the impressive crags just to the north east of the summit. The highest point was originally unnamed on maps, being just a minor top, but over the years the summit has adopted the name of Dove Crag by mutual accord..

== Wainwright's Pictorial Guides ==
One of Dove Crag's claims to fame is that it was the first chapter ever written by Alfred Wainwright for his Pictorial Guide to the Lakeland Fells. He wrote the Dove Crag chapter on 9 November 1952 as he started Book One, after ascending the fell from Ambleside in the previous weeks, making notes and taking photographs. It would take Wainwright a further 14 years to finish the complete series of seven books and 214 fells.

== Topography ==
The Fairfield Group of fells stands between Grasmere and the Kirkstone Pass. The watershed runs south east from Fairfield, crossing Hart Crag, Dove Crag, Little Hart Crag and Red Screes. Dove Crag shows its unassuming back to Rydal in the west, while great crags command the head of Dovedale on the opposite side of the ridge. A lower tier of crags juts out into the valley with Stangs at its head, dividing Dovedale Beck from its main tributary, Hogget Gill.

Dove Crag throws out a southern ridge which descends over High Pike and Low Pike towards Ambleside.

== Geology ==
The volcaniclastic sandstone of the Deepdale Formation is interleaved with andesite sills and breccia.

== Rock climbing ==
The crags of Dove Crag are the fell's finest feature. The crag is about 75 metres (246 feet) high at its highest point and is a popular venue for rock climbers with classic routes such as Extol and Fast and Furious. Lately it has become used by boulderers with several top-class climbs such as Impailed and Pail Attitude on the boulders that have become detached from the main crag. Concealed within the crags is the “Priest's Hole”. This is a cave, roughly about five metres deep with extra protection provided by a wall built in front, which is often used by walkers and climbers as a rough overnight camp. It is well used and stocked (even having a visitors' book) but it is not easy to find in bad conditions. It is marked on the large-scale Ordnance Survey maps but this is only of limited use. It is not mentioned by Alfred Wainwright in his Pictorial Guide to the Lakeland Fells, which suggests that he did not know of its existence. The cave featured in the BBC One series Secret Britain in spring 2016.

== Ascents ==
As mentioned earlier, the majority of the people who climb Dove Crag do so from Ambleside as part of the Fairfield horseshoe walk. However, the ascent from Patterdale gives the walker the opportunity to explore the relatively unknown valley of Dovedale and the beck which flows down it and to study the crags of the fell. It is believed that the upper part of Dovedale was once the crater of a volcano. The ascent from Patterdale starts from the car park at Brothers Water and takes the path to Hartsop Hall. Here the rising path up Dovedale is taken. As the crags are approached at the head of the valley, there is a choice of going to the right or left of them to reach the summit. The fell can also be approached from Ambleside along its long southern ridge passing over the tops of Low Pike and High Pike. The summit is a small rock platform with a cairn.

== Summit ==
A dry stone wall crosses the summit 15 metres to the west and this runs north to south to the adjoining fells of High Pike (south) and Hart Crag (north). The highlight of the summit view is obtained by walking to the edge of the crags and looking down into Dovedale.
