= Seat Sandal =

Fell in the Lake District, Cumbria, England

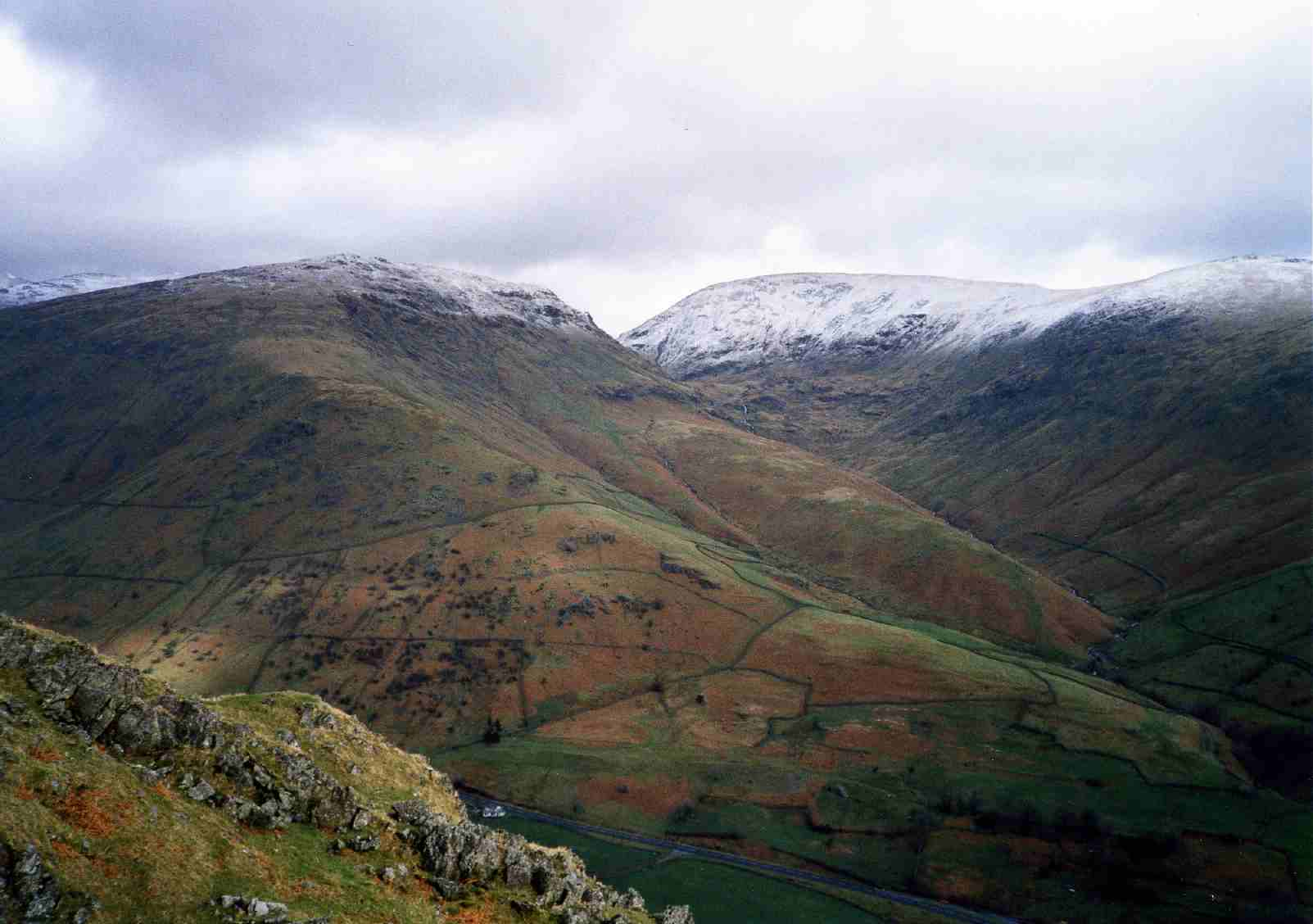
- Seat Sandal (left) and Fairfield (right) seen from Helm Crag 2 km to the south-west

Highest point
- Elevation: 736 m (2,415 ft)
- Prominence: c. 150 m
- Parent peak: Fairfield
- Listing: Hewitt, Marilyn, Nuttall, Wainwright
- Coordinates: 54°29′40″N 3°00′57″W

Geography
- Location within the Lake District
- Location: Cumbria, England
- Parent range: Lake District, Eastern Fells
- OS grid: NY343115
- Topo map: OS Landranger 90 OS Explorer 5

Seat Sandal is a fell in the English Lake District, situated four kilometres (2 1/2 miles) north of the village of Grasmere from where it is very well seen. Nevertheless, it tends to be overshadowed by its higher neighbours in the Eastern Fells, Helvellyn and Fairfield.

== Topography ==
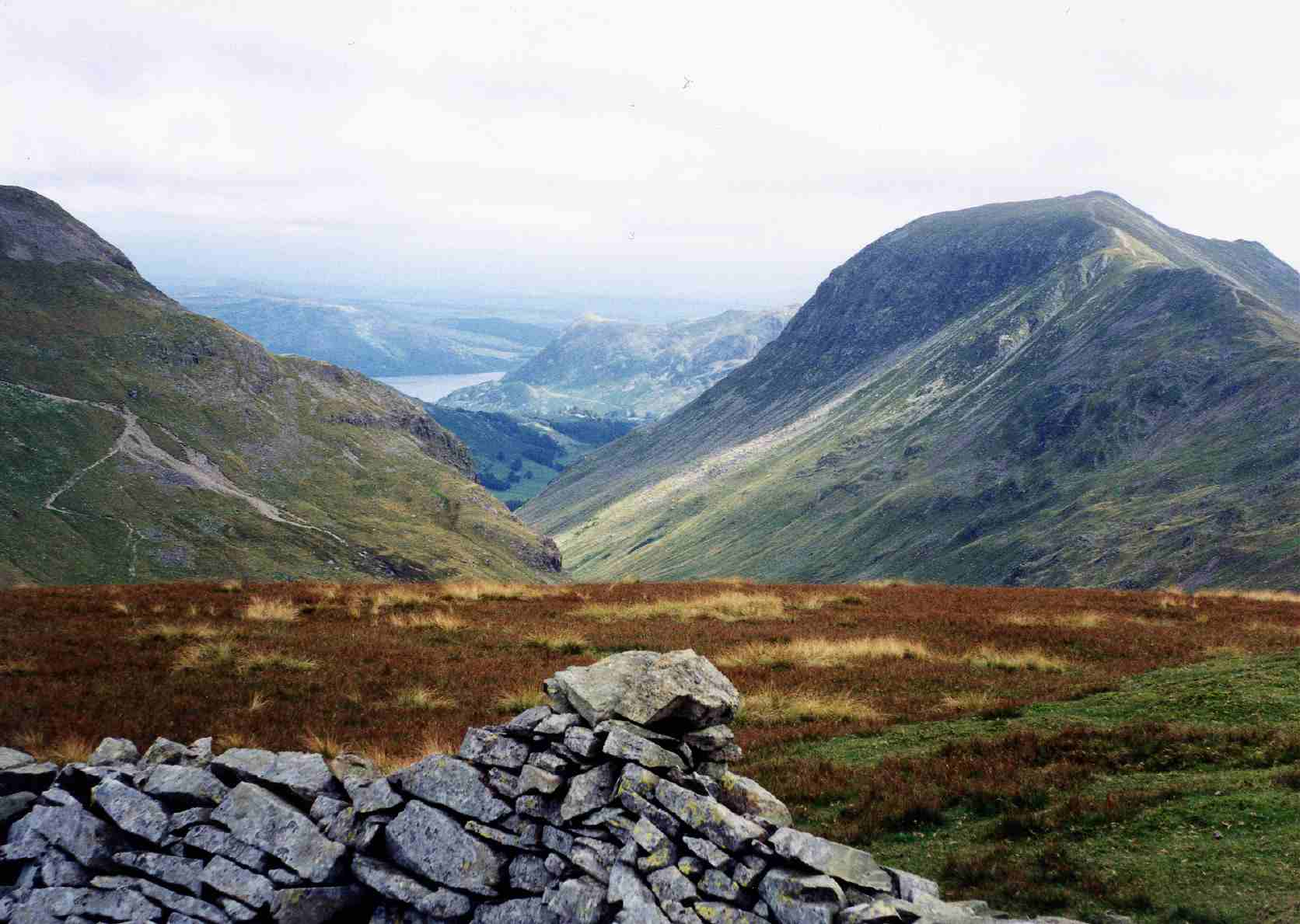
Looking down Grisedale to Ullswater in the far distance from Seat Sandal summit; St Sunday Crag is the fell on the right.

The fell's western flanks above Dunmail Raise are grassy and smooth while its eastern slopes are steep and craggy as they fall away towards Grisedale Hause which at 537 m (1,762 ft) contains Lakeland's highest substantial tarn, Grisedale Tarn. The fell reaches a height of 736 m (2,415 ft) and just scrapes into the list of Marilyns by being given prominence of ‘around’ 150 metres from the higher fell of Fairfield. However, this must be regarded as a borderline case as there is no Ordnance Survey surveyed height for the top of Grisedale Hause. Alfred Wainwright gives it a height of 1,929 feet (588 metres) giving Seat Sandal a topographic prominence of only 148 metres (two metres short of Marilyn qualification).

Seat Sandal is distinctive in that its drainage reaches the sea at more widely spread points than any other Lakeland Fell, with Raise Beck going through Thirlmere and Derwent Water to reach the Irish Sea at Workington, Tongue Beck going through the lakes of Grasmere and Windermere to reach Morecambe Bay and Grisedale Beck draining into Ullswater and then to the sea at the Solway Firth. However, this is true only as a result of the diversion of Raise Beck north to feed Thirlmere Reservoir — before this (and still today when there is enough water in Raise Beck for it to flow both north and south), Dollywaggon Pike shared in this distinction — Birkside Gill feeding Thirlmere, Raise Beck feeding Grasmere, and Grisedale Beck feeding Ullswater. The fell's main topographic attraction is Gavel Crag on its eastern side, which is connected to the main body of the fell by a fine rock arête.

Dunmail Raise provides the topographical connection between the Eastern and Central Fells, Steel Fell rising on the other side of the pass.

== Geology ==
A hill of andesite lava forms the summit, the rocks beneath being the dacitic lapilli-tuffs of the Lincomb Tarns Formation.

== Ascents ==
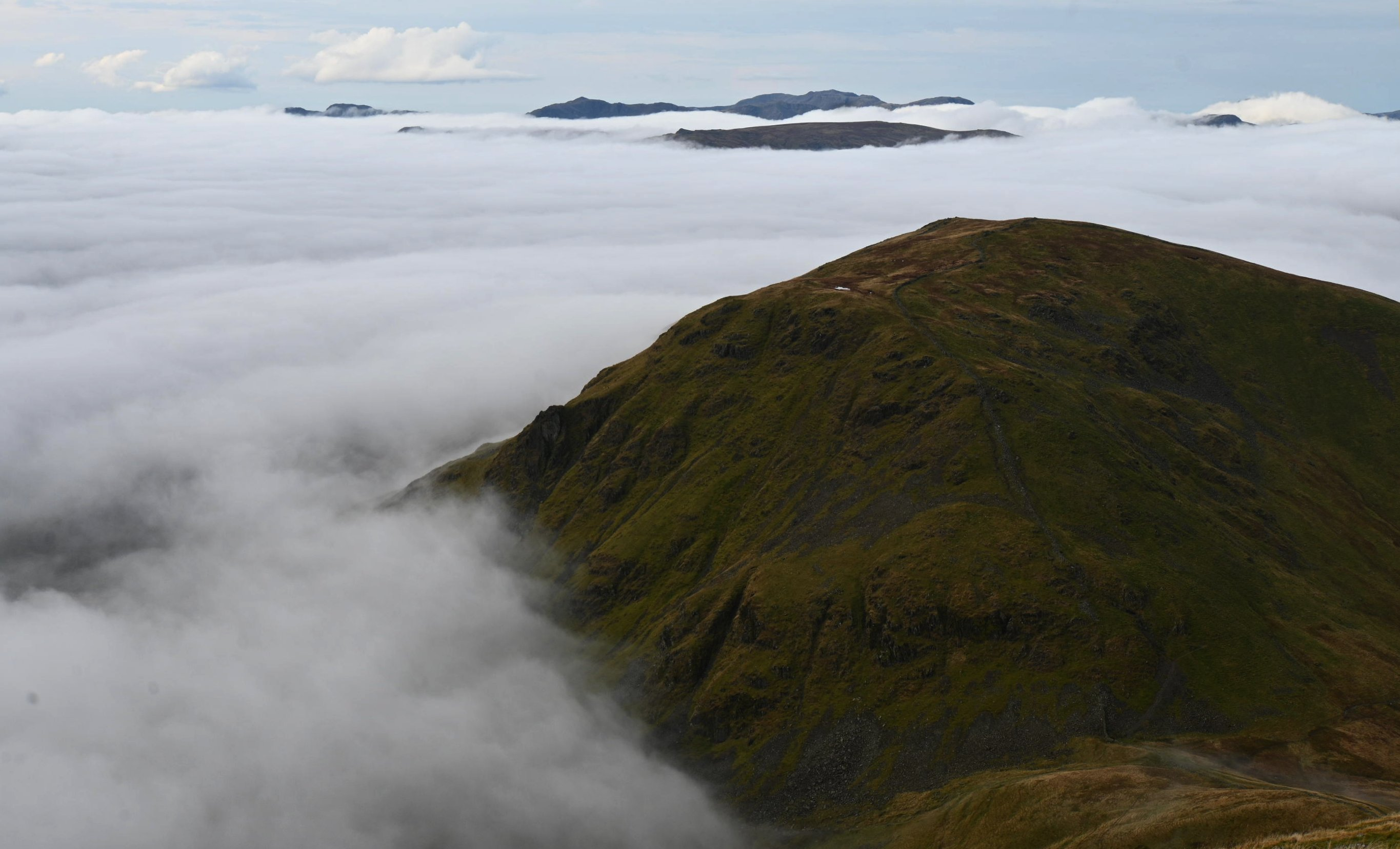
Seat Sandal seen from Fairfield, showing route of ascent from Grisedale Hause

The fell can be ascended from Grasmere or Dunmail Raise although a start from Patterdale is quite feasible. The Grasmere or Patterdale starts use the old packhorse route that links the two places; this is now part of Wainwright's Coast to Coast Walk. When Grisedale Hause is reached, it is a steep climb to the summit following a broken wall. The ascent from Dunmail Raise follows the bed of Raise Beck until it peters out at a height of 580 m (1,900 ft); it is then a walk south up easy slopes to reach the summit. There is also a direct ascent up the western slopes starting at Mill Bridge.

== Summit ==
The view from the top is limited by the nearby Helvellyn and Fairfield ranges, although there is a good view of the fells to the west; the Solway Firth and Criffel are seen on a clear day, as is Morecambe Bay to the south.
