= Hart Crag =

Fell in the Lake District, Cumbria, England

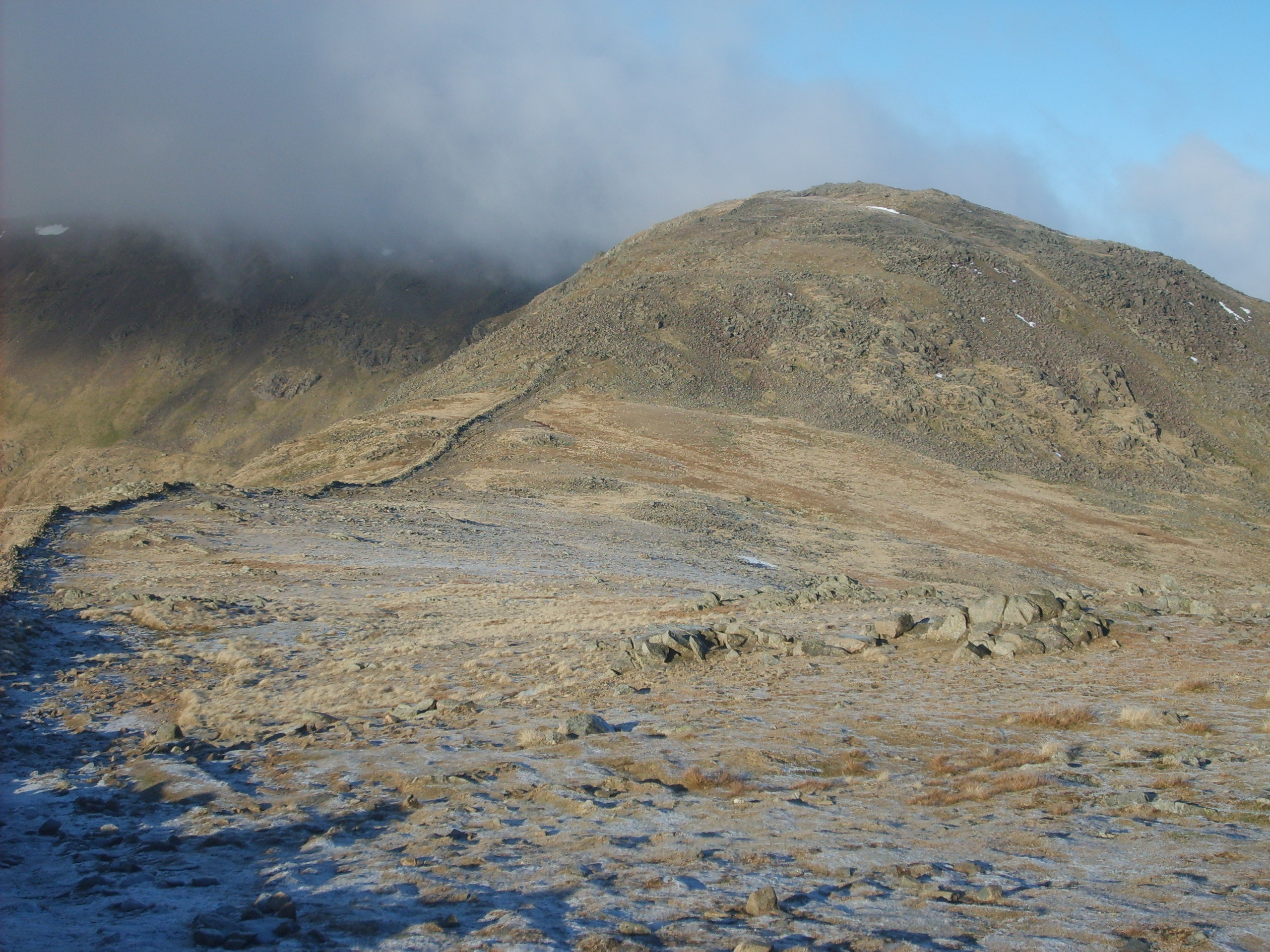
- Hart Crag, with a cloud-covered Fairfield behind.

Highest point
- Elevation: 822 m (2,697 ft)
- Prominence: c. 50 m
- Parent peak: Fairfield
- Listing: Wainwright, Nuttall, Hewitt
- Coordinates: 54°29′35″N 2°58′38″W

Geography
- Location within the Lake District
- Location: Cumbria, England
- Parent range: Lake District, Eastern Fells
- OS grid: NY368113
- Topo map: OS Explorer OL5

Hart Crag is a fell in the English Lake District, being one of the Fairfield group of hills in the Eastern Fells.

== Topography ==
The fell stands on the ridge running south east from Fairfield to Dove Crag, at the point where a long subsidiary spur sweeps off to the north east. This is Hartsop above How and, although in reality part of Hart Crag, was treated as a separate fell by Alfred Wainwright in his Pictorial Guide to the Lakeland Fells. That convention is also followed here.

Being at the meeting point of three ridges, Hart Crag also has a share in three valleys. Despite forming a part of the headwall in each case, the fell is not the true head of any of them. West of the summit runs the long and unfrequented valley of Rydal Beck. This flows almost due south for 3 miles (5 km), finally emptying into the River Rothay at Rydal village. The slopes of Rydal Head below Hart Crag are steep, but reasonably free of outcropping rock.

To the north of Hart Crag is Link Cove. This is a hanging valley, discharging via waterfalls into upper Deepdale. Deepdale Beck in turn runs north east to join other streams bound for Ullswater. The main faces of Hart Crag lie on this side, presenting a fine prospect from St Sunday Crag and other fells to the north. Dovedale is the third valley, running broadly eastward and separated from Deepdale by the Hartsop Above How ridge. Immediately below Hart Crag is Houndshope Cove, a high level corrie in upper Dovedale.

The ridge to Fairfield starts north-westward as far as the saddle of Link Hause (750 metres, 2,450 ft). This is the geographical link between Rydale and Link Cove, but there is no practicable walkers' route from one to the other. Beyond here the ridge mounts a rocky step (the end of Scrubby Crag) and then turns westward onto the widening grassy top of Fairfield.

Dove Crag to the south-east is reached across the unnamed col between Houndshope Cove and Rydale. A stone wall runs along the majority of the ridge, providing an aid to route-finding in poor conditions. The Hartsop Above How ridge starts indistinctly from the summit of Hart Crag, a descent across a wide area of rough ground being made before a discernible ridgeline materialises.

== Summit ==
The summit of Hart Crag has a covering of rock with rich turf showing through. Two cairns mark the ends of a short ridge running along the top, with other cairns giving guidance to the viewpoints for Deepdale and Dovedale. The highest point is at the south-eastern end of the summit area, a little to the west of the main path. The view is good westward to the Scafells and also toward the Far Eastern Fells, but Fairfield and Dove Crag obscure much of the District.

== Ascents ==
Hart Crag is most commonly climbed as part of the Fairfield horseshoe. This popular fellwalk makes a circuit of Rydale, claiming 8 Wainwrights over a distance of 10 miles (16 km). Starting at Bridgend, Hartsop Above How provides another means of indirect access.

A number of direct ascents are also possible. Rydale can be followed to its head from where the steep climb out of the valley leads to the summit. Alternatively an approach can be made along Deepdale, skirting the worst of the bogs, and climbing onto the Hartsop Above How ridge from the lower part of Link Cove. Dovedale and Houndshope Cove provide a third possibility.
