= Fairfield (Lake District) =

Fell in the English Lake District

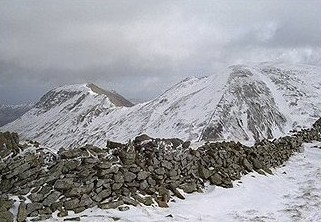
- Fairfield (right) and St Sunday Crag, seen from Seat Sandal

Highest point
- Elevation: 873 m (2,864 ft)
- Prominence: 299 m (981 ft)
- Parent peak: Helvellyn
- Listing: Hewitt, Marilyn, Nuttall, Wainwright
- Coordinates: 54°29′49″N 2°59′26″W

Geography
- Location within the Lake District Location within the former South Lakeland district Location within the former Eden District
- Location: Cumbria, England
- Parent range: Lake District, Eastern Fells
- OS grid: NY358117
- Topo map: OS Landranger 90, Explorer OL5

Fairfield is a fell in the English Lake District. It is the highest of a group of hills in the Eastern Fells, standing to the south of the Helvellyn range.

== Topography ==
There is a marked contrast between the character of the northern and southern flanks of Fairfield. Alfred Wainwright in his influential Pictorial Guide to the Lakeland Fells wrote that "From the south it appears as a great horseshoe of grassy slopes below a consistently high skyline...but lacking those dramatic qualities that appeal most to the lover of hills. But on the north side the Fairfield range is magnificent: here are dark precipices, long fans of scree...desolate combes and deep valleys."

Fairfield has connecting ridges to several other fells and in plan view can be likened to a bow-tie. The top has an east–west axis with ridges running out north and south from each end.

The two southern arms make up the popular walk, the Fairfield horseshoe, which starts in Ambleside and makes a circuit of the valley of Rydale to the south. On the western side, descending from Fairfield are Great Rigg, Heron Pike and Nab Scar while the eastern ridge bears the tops of Hart Crag, Dove Crag, High Pike and Low Pike.

The north-western ridge of Fairfield crosses Deepdale Hause to St Sunday Crag whilst that to the north east is a short rocky spur into Deepdale, dropping over Greenhow End. A fifth line of high ground, less a ridge than a salient in the breast of the fell, runs due west to Seat Sandal across Grisedale Hause.

The northern and eastern faces all loom above the desolate upper Deepdale, which is divided by Greenhow End. This short rocky spur has Hutaple Crag on the west and Scrubby Crag on the east. The corries of Cawk Cove and Link Cove lie on either side, each with a steep headwall formed by the flanks of Fairfield.

== Grisedale Tarn ==
North-west of Fairfield is Grisedale Tarn at around 1,770 ft (540 m). This sizeable tarn has a depth of over 100 ft (30 m) and holds brown trout, perch and eels. It is also the legendary resting place of the crown of Dunmail, following his—perhaps equally legendary—defeat in battle at Dunmail Raise. The outflow is to Ullswater, 3 miles (4.8 km) to the north-east along the strath of Grisedale. The south western flank of Fairfield looks down on Tongue Gill, a feeder of Raise Beck and Grasmere.

== Geology ==
The volcaniclastic sandstone and [[lapilli [tuff]] of the Deepdale Formation overlie the dacitic lapilli tuff of the Helvellyn Formation.

== Summit ==
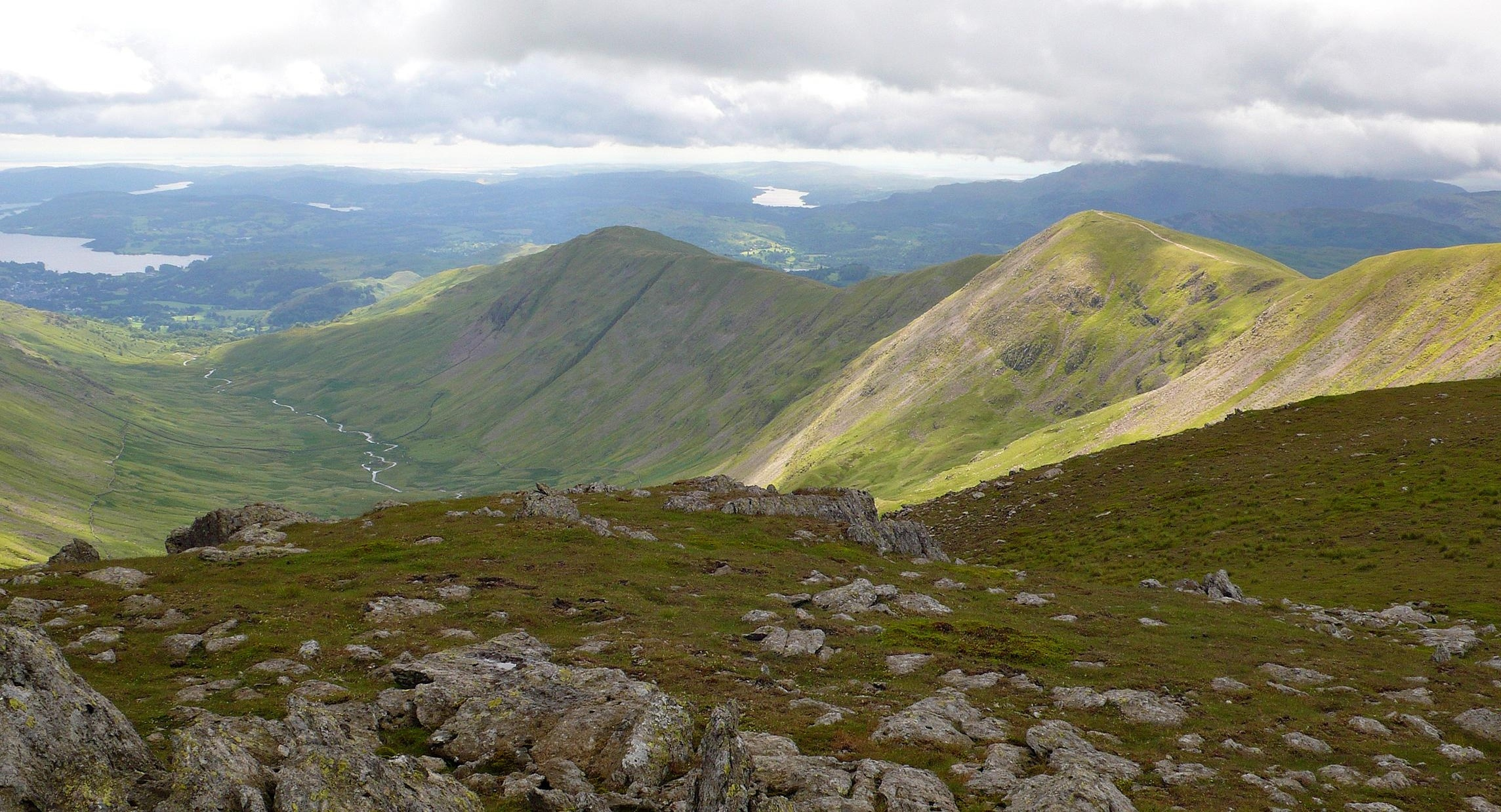
The view south-southwest over Heron Pike and Great Rigg from Fairfield's summit.

The summit is a rough stony plateau with the high point at the western end above the brink of Cawk Cove. The top is very flat and there are many cairns, including a pair of large windbreaks near the high point.

Guidebook writers warn that it is easy to get lost in mist and that the cautious walker should beware of the presence of precipices to the north and west. The vista is fine, with all of the major fell groups well seen and views down into the abyss of Deepdale only yards away.

Other fells visible at close hand include Helvellyn (with its spectacular arête Striding Edge), Nethermost Pike, Saint Sunday Crag and Cofa Pike (a subsidiary summit of Fairfield).

The view south towards Ambleside and Rydal over Rydal Head is also extensive, with Windermere and Coniston Water in view.

== Ascents ==
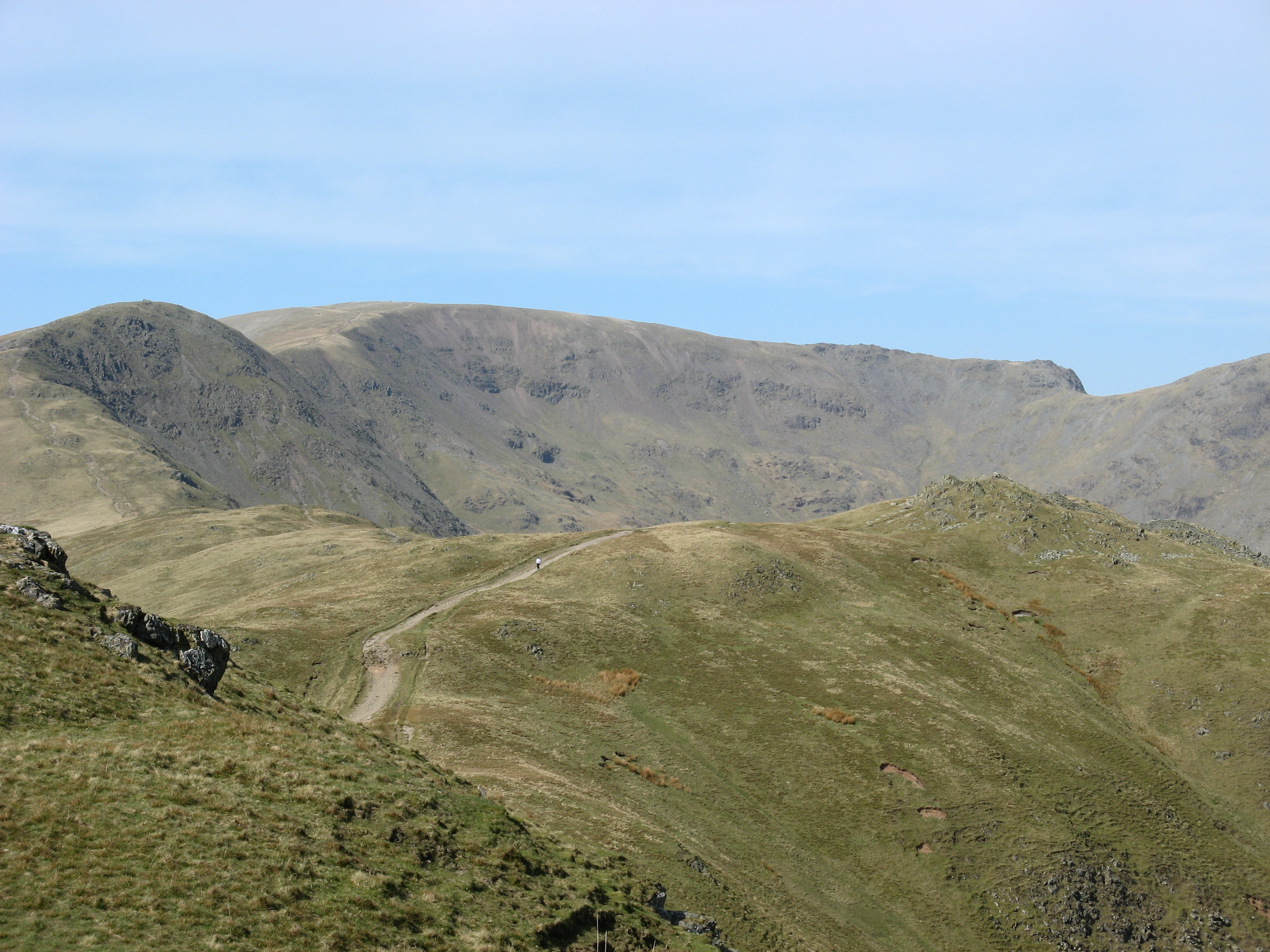
Great Rigg (left) and Fairfield from Heron Pike, on the Fairfield horseshoe.

Fairfield is most commonly climbed as the high point of the Fairfield horseshoe, a walk which has no agreed direction of travel. Coming from Great Rigg, the long grassy ridge heads directly for the summit, whilst the walker arriving from Hart Crag climbs up from Link Hause with a fine view of Scrubby Crag to the right, before the stony traverse of Fairfield summit.

Fairfield has an indirect ascent from Patterdale via Birks and St Sunday Crag, following the narrow ridge down to Deepdale Hause before ascending rough ground to Cofa Pike. This subsidiary top of Fairfield has a peaked profile. A further rock tor is surmounted before the summit windbreaks are reached.

Fairfield can be climbed via Grisedale Hause, either up Tongue Gill from Grasmere, from Dunmail Raise or from Patterdale. The path up from the Hause is a rough zigzag up worsening scree. Grisedale Hause can also be reached as a ridge walk from Seat Sandal, or by cutting across the outlet of Grisedale Tarn from Dollywaggon Pike and the Helvellyns. In this way Fairfield forms part of the Threlkeld–Kirkstone Walk, which continues over Fairfield summit to Dove Crag and Red Screes.

A more challenging route climbs out of Deepdale, veering into the lower part of Link Cove before surmounting Greenhow End and The Step. Deepdale Hause can also be gained from this side, but climbs direct out of Link Cove or Cowk Cove are not practicable for walkers.

== Panoramas ==
Computer-generated panorama from summit: http://www.viewfinderpanoramas.org/panoramas/ENGP/Fairfield.png
