= Eastern Fells =

Region of the Cumbrian Mountains

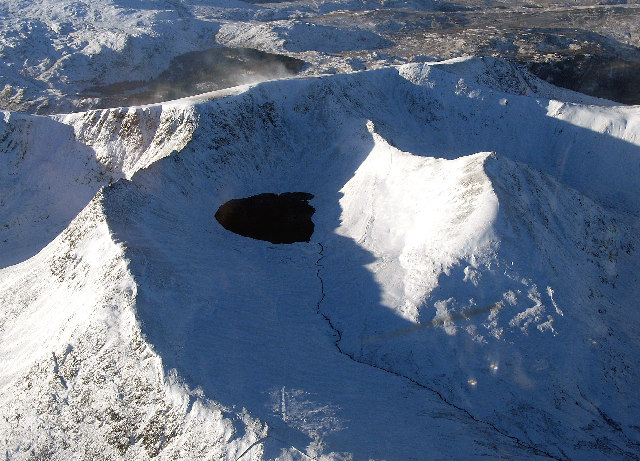
Helvellyn from the air

The Eastern Fells are a part of the Cumbrian Mountains in the Lake District of England. Centred on Helvellyn they primarily comprise a north–south ridge running between Ullswater and Lakeland's Central Valley.

== Partition of the Lakeland fells ==
The Lake District is a National Park in the north west of the country and in addition to its lakes it contains a complex range of hills. These are locally known as fells and range from low hills to the highest ground in England. Hundreds of tops exist and many writers have attempted to draw up definitive lists of fells and divided the range into areas to aid their description.

The most influential of all such writers was Alfred Wainwright whose Pictorial Guide to the Lakeland Fells series has sold in excess of 2 million copies, being in print continuously since the first volume was published in 1955. Wainwright divided the fells into seven geographical areas, each surrounded by valleys and low passes. While any such division must be arbitrary and later writers have deviated to a greater or lesser extent from this blueprint, the sevenfold division remains the best known partitioning of the fells into 'sub ranges', each with its own characteristics. The Eastern Fells are one of these divisions, covered by volume 1 of Wainwright's work.

== Boundaries and principal sub-groups ==
The Eastern Fells occupy the region between the A591 Keswick to Ambleside road and the lake of Ullswater to the west. The Helvellyn range forms the main spine of the group, running on a north–south axis and remaining above 2,000 feet (610 m) throughout its length. To the south of the Helvellyn range, across the depression of Grisedale Hause, is the Fairfield group of fells. There are also a number of subsidiary ridges and outliers, particularly to the east of the main range.

== Topography ==
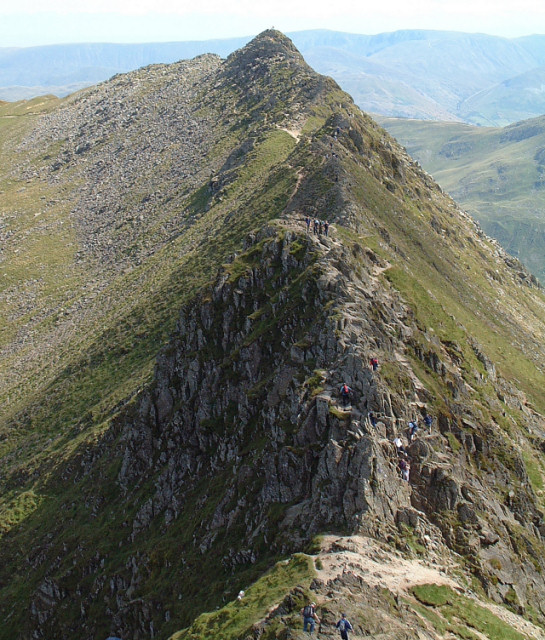
Striding Edge

The outliers of the eastern fells stand to the north of Ullswater, seemingly isolated hills rising out of an upland plateau between the lake and the wide lowlands to the north east. Great Mell Fell and Little Mell Fell are rounded "pudding basins", the first stirrings of Lakeland on the approach from Penrith, while Gowbarrow Fell shows the initial outcropping of rock.

The Helvellyn range proper begins in the north at Clough Head, which reverses the character of the rest of these fells by bearing its crags to the west and its long smooth slopes to the east. South from here are The Dodds, three fells clad in grass almost throughout. Great Dodd and Stybarrow Dodd throw out long ridges to the east, enclosing the marshy valley of Deepdale. Between the two is Watson's Dodd, a ridge top with considerably less prominence. The range now drops to a low point at Sticks Pass, a bridleway linking the settlements around Thirlmere and Ullswater. This is the only point on the main ridge below 1,500 feet (460 m).

South of the Sticks, the western slopes are round and smooth while the eastern flanks become craggier with every passing mile. Raise and White Side are followed by the highest of the eastern fells, Helvellyn. East from its summit plateau run the twin arêtes of Striding and Swirral Edges, the former easily the most famous ridge walk in Lakeland. The long valleys of Glenridding and Grisedale cut deep into the range from the shores of Ullswater. The final tops of the Helvellyn range are Nethermost Pike and Dollywaggon Pike, both displaying shattered faces above Grisedale of which there is no hint in views from the west.

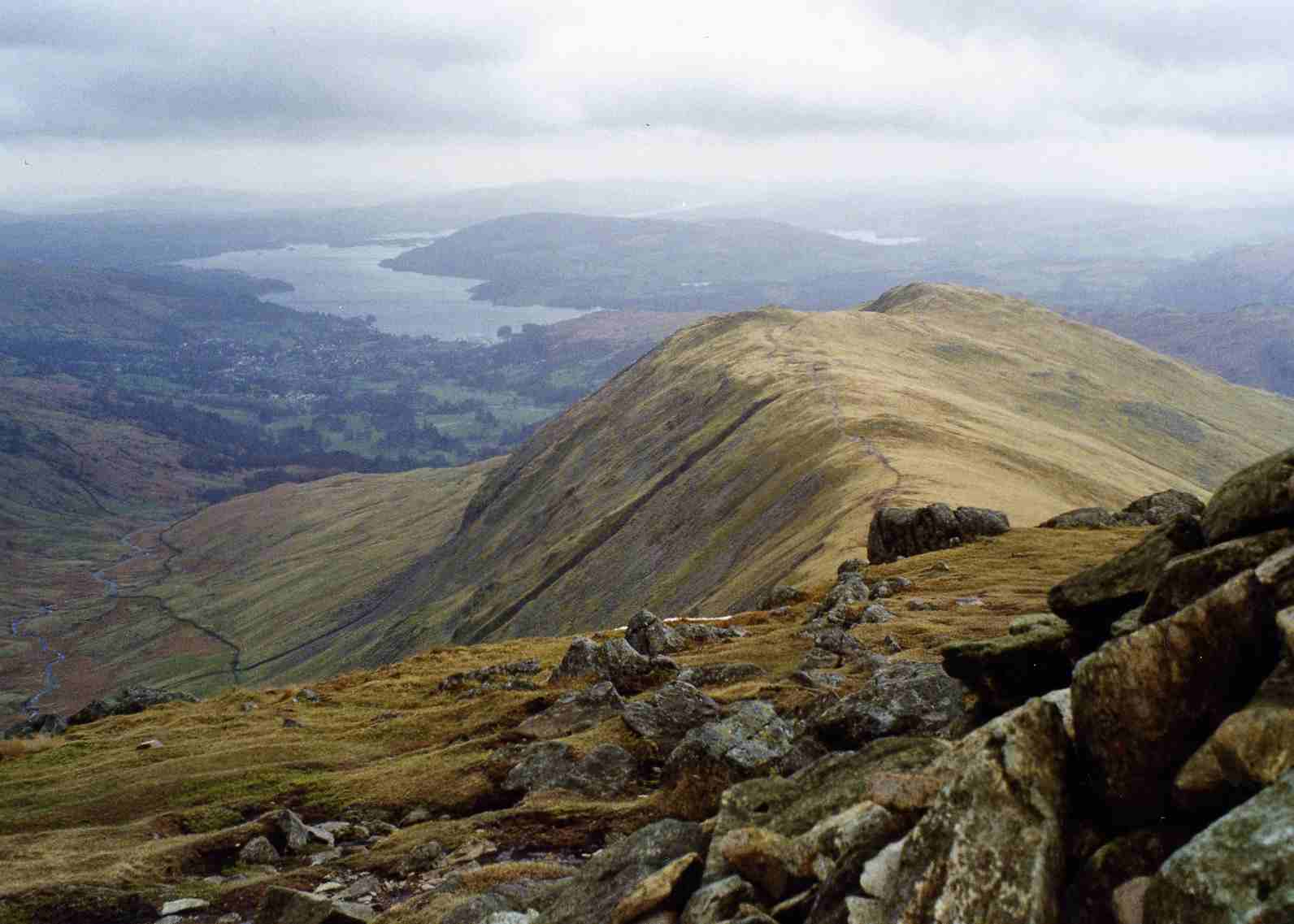
Heron Pike from Great Rigg, Windermere in the background

The head of Grisedale rises towards Raise Beck on the western side, culminating in the pass of Grisedale Hause. At 1,880 feet (570 m) this lowpoint divides the Helvellyn range from the more complex Fairfield group of fells. Beginning with Seat Sandal the watershed continues south-east over Fairfield, Hart Crag and Dove Crag to the col at Scandale Pass (a footpath). The pattern of the Helvellyns is repeated with walls of crag on the north east and grass on the opposing flanks. Long valleys now cut in from both sides with (another) Deepdale and Dovedale to the north and Rydale and Scandale to the south. If Striding Edge is the most popular ridge in the Lake District, then the circuit of Rydale, commonly known as the Fairfield horseshoe, is the most popular circular ridge walk. Beyond Scandale pass, separate but still considered a part of the Fairfield Group, is Red Screes. This is the final top before the ground drops down to the road over Kirkstone Pass. Rising on the other side are the Far Eastern Fells.

== Access for walkers ==
Ambleside provides a base at the south-west corner of the range. In the east, Patterdale provides the focal point. From here the long valleys of Grisedale and Glenridding can be used to gain access deep into the fells. Further south are the mouths of Deepdale and Dovedale, gateways to the rock scenery of the Fairfield group. Kirkstone Pass provides a 1,500 feet (460 m) headstart for climbs of Red Screes, together with a pub.

== See also ==
- Far Eastern Fells
- Central Fells
- Southern Fells
- Northern Fells
- North Western Fells
- Western Fells
