= List of Birketts =

Lake district peaks over 1,000 ft

Birketts
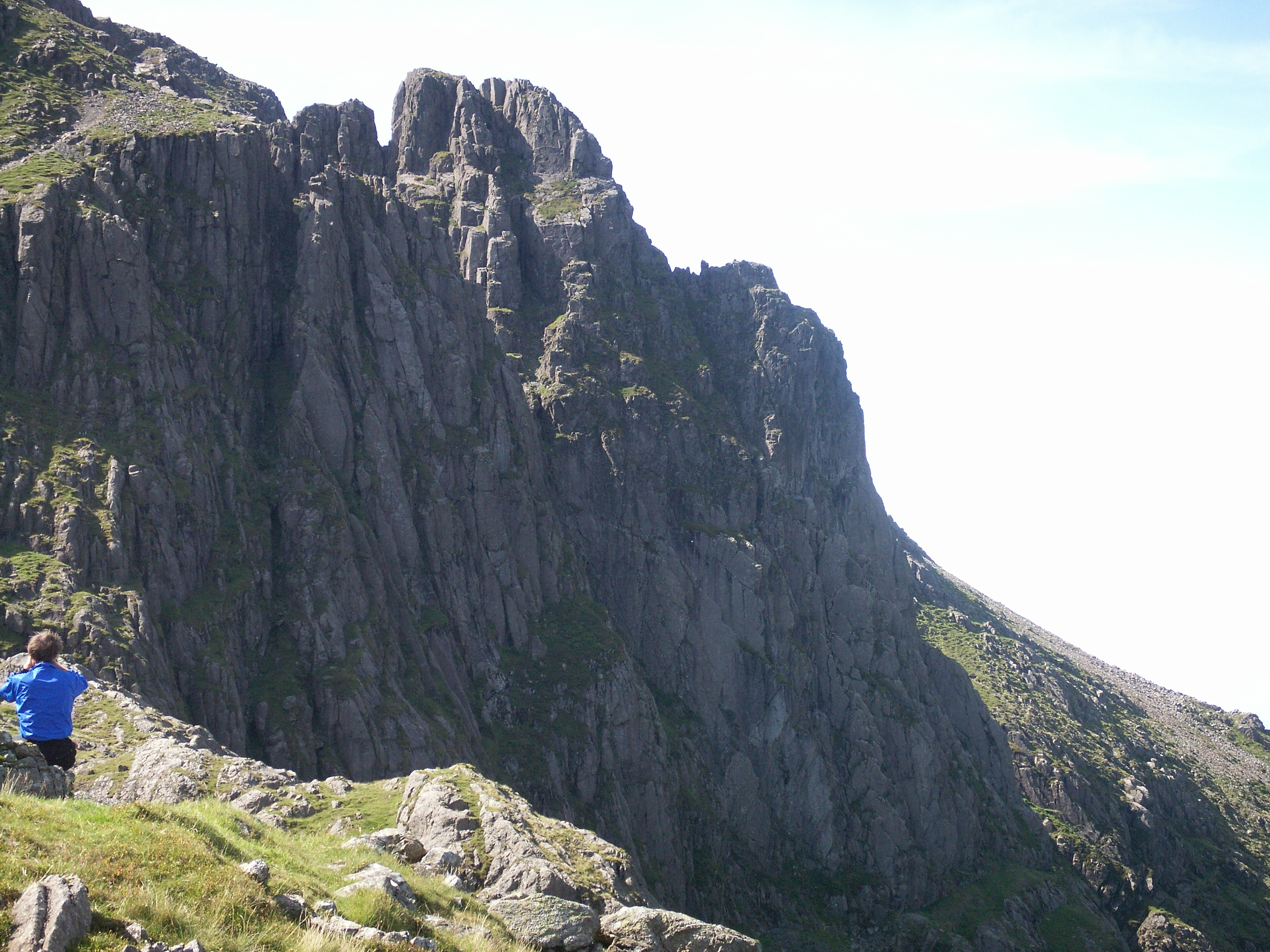
- Pillar Rock in the Lake District National Park is the only Birkett that requires ropes to climb.

Highest point
- Elevation: over 1,000 ft (304.8 m)
- Prominence: no specific formula

Geography
- Location: 541 Lake District Birketts : 209 of the 214 Wainwrights : 59 of the 116 Outlying Fells

Birketts are the 541 English peaks described in Bill Birkett's 1994 guidebook, Complete Lakeland Fells. The author defined them as all hills within the boundary of the Lake District National Park in Cumbria which are over 1,000 feet (304.8 m) in height.

Bill Birkett's book became a popular list for peak bagging in the Lake District, along with the more popular Wainwrights. Because both lists are based on historical books, unlike for example the Murdos, their constituents remain fixed, regardless of revisions to height or other metrics. In this regard, they are similar to the Scottish Lowlands, Donalds. The Long Distance Walkers Association maintains a register of people who have completed the Birketts. One of Birkett's peaks, Pillar Rock, which is also classed as a Nuttall, but not a Wainwright, requires climbing ropes and climbing equipment to summit.

There are 541 Birketts, which include 211 of the 214 Wainwrights, and 59 of the 116 Wainwright Outlying Fells. Birketts range from hills, such as the smallest Birkett, Great Stickle, at 1,001 feet (305.1 m), to major mountains in the British Isles, such as Scafell Pike, at just over 3,209 feet (978.1 m). While 65 of the Birketts have a prominence above 150 metres (492.1 ft), and are Marilyns, 159 have a prominence below 15 metres (49.2 ft), and 42 of these are below 5 metres (16.4 ft). 54 of the 514 peaks are solely Birketts, and meet no other mountain or hill classification in the British Isles.

== Birketts by height ==
This list is from the Database of British and Irish Hills ("DoBIH") in October 2018, and are peaks the DoBIH marks as being Birketts ("B"). (Note: The Database of British and Irish Hills ("DoBIH") is the most referenced database for the classification of peaks in the British Isles, and the DoBIH is licensed under a "Creative Commons Attribution 3.0 Unported License".) The DoBIH updates their measurements as more surveys are recorded, so these tables should not be amended or updated unless the entire DoBIH data is re–downloaded again.

Birketts, ranked by height (DoBIH, October 2018)
Height Rank	Name	Section	Wainwright	Height (m)	Prom. (m)	Height (ft)	Prom. (ft)	Topo Map	OS Grid Reference	Classification (§ DoBIH codes)
1	Scafell Pike	34B: LD C&W	Wainwright	978	912	3,209	2,992	89 90	NY215072	Ma,F,Sim,Hew,N,W, B,Sy,Fel,CoH,CoU,CoA
2	Scafell	34B: LD C&W	Wainwright	964	132	3,162	434	89 90	NY206064	Hu,F,Sim,Hew,N,W, B,Sy,Fel
3	Helvellyn	34C: LD E	Wainwright	950	712	3,117	2,336	90	NY342151	Ma,F,Sim,Hew,N,W, B,Sy,Fel,CoH
4	Broad Crag	34B: LD C&W		935	58	3,069	189	89 90	NY218075	F,Sim,Hew,N,B,Sy
5	Skiddaw	34A: LD N	Wainwright	931	709	3,054	2,326	89 90	NY260290	Ma,F,Sim,Hew,N,W, B,Sy,Fel
6	Ill Crag	34B: LD C&W		931	49	3,054	159	89 90	NY223073	F,Sim,Hew,N,B,Sy
7	Skiddaw Middle Top	34A: LD N		928	9	3,045	30	89 90	NY260288	B
8	Helvellyn Lower Man	34C: LD E		925	18	3,035	59	90	NY337155	N,B,Sy
9	Skiddaw South Top	34A: LD N		925	4	3,035	13	89 90	NY260286	B
10	Skiddaw North Top	34A: LD N		922	1	3,025	3	89 90	NY260292	B
11	Great End	34B: LD C&W	Wainwright	910	56	2,984	184	89 90	NY226083	Sim,Hew,N,W,B,Sy,Fel
12	Bowfell	34B: LD C&W	Wainwright	903	148	2,962	486	89 90	NY244064	Hu,Sim,Hew,N,sMa,W,B,Sy,Fel
13	Great Gable	34B: LD C&W	Wainwright	899	425	2,949	1,394	89 90	NY211103	Ma,Sim,Hew,N,W,B,Sy,Fel
14	Pillar	34B: LD C&W	Wainwright	892	348	2,927	1,142	89 90	NY171121	Ma,Sim,Hew,N,W,B,Sy,Fel
15	Nethermost Pike	34C: LD E	Wainwright	891	29	2,923	95	90	NY343142	N,sSim,W,B,Sy,Fel
16	Catstye Cam	34C: LD E	Wainwright	890	63	2,920	207	90	NY348158	Sim,Hew,N,W,B,Sy,Fel
17	Esk Pike	34B: LD C&W	Wainwright	885	112	2,904	367	89 90	NY236075	Hu,Sim,Hew,N,W,B,Sy,Fel
18	High Crag (Helvellyn)	34C: LD E		884	13	2,900	43	90	NY343136	B,Sy,xN
19	Raise	34C: LD E	Wainwright	883	91	2,897	299	90	NY342174	Sim,Hew,N,sHu,W,B,Sy,Fel
20	Fairfield	34C: LD E	Wainwright	873	299	2,864	981	90	NY358117	Ma,Sim,Hew,N,W,B,Sy,Fel
21	Blencathra	34A: LD N	Wainwright	868	461	2,848	1,512	90	NY323277	Ma,Sim,Hew,N,W,B,Sy,Fel
22	Skiddaw Little Man	34A: LD N	Wainwright	865	61	2,838	200	89 90	NY266277	Sim,Hew,N,W,B,Sy,Fel
23	White Side	34C: LD E	Wainwright	863	42	2,831	138	90	NY337166	Sim,Hew,N,W,B,Sy,Fel
24	Crinkle Crags [Long Top]	34B: LD C&W	Wainwright	859	139	2,818	456	89 90	NY248048	Hu,Sim,Hew,N,W,B,Sy,Fel
25	Dollywaggon Pike	34C: LD E	Wainwright	858	50	2,815	164	90	NY346130	Sim,Hew,N,W,B,Sy,Fel
26	Great Dodd	34C: LD E	Wainwright	857	109	2,812	358	90	NY342205	Hu,Sim,Hew,N,W,B,Sy,Fel
27	Grasmoor	34B: LD C&W	Wainwright	852	519	2,795	1,703	89 90	NY174203	Ma,Sim,Hew,N,W,B,Sy,Fel
28	Gategill Fell Top	34A: LD N		851	18	2,792	59	90	NY317273	N,B,Sy
29	Atkinson Pike [Foule Crag]	34A: LD N		845	16	2,772	52	90	NY324283	N,B,Sy
30	Stybarrow Dodd	34C: LD E	Wainwright	843	68	2,766	223	90	NY343189	Sim,Hew,N,W,B,Sy,Fel
31	Scoat Fell	34B: LD C&W	Wainwright	841	86	2,759	282	89	NY159113	Sim,Hew,N,W,B,Sy,Fel
32	St Sunday Crag	34C: LD E	Wainwright	841	159	2,759	522	90	NY369133	Ma,Sim,Hew,N,W,B,Sy,Fel
33	Crinkle Crags [Third Crinkle]	34B: LD C&W		840	14	2,756	46	89 90	NY250049	B,xN
34	Crag Hill [Eel Crag]	34B: LD C&W	Wainwright	839	117	2,753	384	89 90	NY192203	Hu,Sim,Hew,N,W,B,Sy,Fel
35	Crinkle Crags [South Top]	34B: LD C&W		834	32	2,736	105	89 90	NY250045	Sim,Hew,N,B,Sy
36	Crinkle Crags [Fourth Crinkle]	34B: LD C&W		832	3	2,730	10	89 90	NY249050	B
37	Broad End	34A: LD N		831	3	2,726	10	89 90	NY261298	B
38	High Street	34C: LD E	Wainwright	828	373	2,717	1,224	90	NY440110	Ma,Sim,Hew,N,W,B,Sy,Fel
39	Black Crag	34B: LD C&W		828	34	2,717	112	89	NY166116	Sim,Hew,N,B,Sy
40	Red Pike (Wasdale)	34B: LD C&W	Wainwright	826	62	2,710	203	89	NY165106	Sim,Hew,N,W,B,Sy,Fel
41	Cofa Pike	34C: LD E		823	13	2,700	43	90	NY358120	B,Sy
42	Hart Crag	34C: LD E	Wainwright	822	48	2,697	157	90	NY369112	Sim,Hew,N,W,B,Sy,Fel
43	Crinkle Crags [Gunson Knott]	34B: LD C&W		822	7	2,697	23	89 90	NY249051	B
44	Steeple	34B: LD C&W	Wainwright	819	24	2,687	79	89	NY157116	N,sSim,W,B,Sy,Fel
45	Shelter Crags	34B: LD C&W		815	31	2,674	102	89 90	NY249053	Sim,Hew,N,B,Sy
46	Skiddaw Lesser Man	34A: LD N		815	4	2,674	13	89 90	NY268275	B
47	Pike de Bield	34B: LD C&W		810	11	2,657	36	89 90	NY236068	B,Sy
48	Lingmell	34B: LD C&W	Wainwright	807	72	2,648	236	89 90	NY209081	Sim,Hew,N,W,B,Sy,Fel
49	High Stile [Grey Crag]	34B: LD C&W		807	362	2,648	1,188	89 90	NY170148	Ma,Sim,Hew,N,B,Sy,Fel
50	Eel Crag	34B: LD C&W		807	5	2,648	16	89 90	NY190206	B
51	High Stile	34B: LD C&W	Wainwright	806	10	2,644	33	89	NY167147	W,B
52	Knowe Crags [Blease Fell]	34A: LD N		805	14	2,641	46	90	NY311270	B,Sy,xN
53	The Old Man of Coniston	34D: LD S	Wainwright	802	415	2,633	1,362	96 97	SD272978	Ma,Sim,Hew,N,W,B,Sy,Fel,CoH
54	Swirl How	34D: LD S	Wainwright	802	120	2,633	394	89 90	NY272005	Hu,Sim,Hew,N,W,B,Sy,Fel
55	Kirk Fell	34B: LD C&W	Wainwright	802	181	2,631	594	89 90	NY194104	Ma,Sim,Hew,N,W,B,Sy,Fel
56	High Raise (High Street)	34C: LD E	Wainwright	802	88	2,631	289	90	NY448134	Sim,Hew,N,W,B,Sy,Fel
57	Green Gable	34B: LD C&W	Wainwright	801	50	2,628	164	89 90	NY214107	Sim,Hew,N,W,B,Sy,Fel
58	Haycock	34B: LD C&W	Wainwright	797	94	2,615	308	89	NY144107	Sim,Hew,N,sHu,W,B,Sy,Fel
59	Brim Fell	34D: LD S	Wainwright	796	21	2,612	69	96 97	SD270985	N,sSim,W,B,Sy,Fel
60	Green Side [White Stones]	34C: LD E		795	30	2,608	98	90	NY352187	Sim,Hew,N,B,Sy
61	Rampsgill Head	34C: LD E	Wainwright	792	41	2,598	135	90	NY443128	Sim,Hew,N,W,B,Sy,Fel
62	Dove Crag	34C: LD E	Wainwright	792	50	2,598	164	90	NY374104	Sim,Hew,N,W,B,Sy,Fel
63	Grisedale Pike	34B: LD C&W	Wainwright	791	189	2,595	620	89 90	NY198225	Ma,Sim,Hew,N,W,B,Sy,Fel
64	Watson's Dodd	34C: LD E	Wainwright	789	11	2,589	36	90	NY335195	W,B,Sy,Fel
65	Kirk Fell East Top	34B: LD C&W		787	36	2,582	118	89 90	NY199107	Sim,Hew,N,B,Sy
66	Allen Crags	34B: LD C&W	Wainwright	785	60	2,575	197	89 90	NY236085	Sim,Hew,N,W,B,Sy,Fel
67	Great Carrs	34D: LD S	Wainwright	785	20	2,575	66	89 90	NY270009	N,sSim,W,B,Sy,Fel
68	Little Dodd (St John's Common)	34C: LD E		785	–	2,575	–	90	NY337204	B
69	Thornthwaite Crag	34C: LD E	Wainwright	784	31	2,572	102	90	NY431100	Sim,Hew,N,W,B,Sy,Fel
70	Gavel Pike	34C: LD E		784	4	2,572	13	90	NY372134	B,Sy
71	Glaramara	34B: LD C&W	Wainwright	783	121	2,569	397	89 90	NY245104	Hu,Sim,Hew,N,W,B,Sy,Fel
72	Kidsty Pike	34C: LD E	Wainwright	780	15	2,559	49	90	NY447125	N,W,B,Sy,Fel
73	Pillar Rock	34B: LD C&W		780	15	2,559	49	89 90	NY171123	N,B,Sy
74	Harter Fell (Mardale)	34C: LD E	Wainwright	779	149	2,556	490	90	NY459093	Hu,Sim,Hew,N,sMa,W,B,Sy,Fel
75	Dow Crag	34D: LD S	Wainwright	778	129	2,552	423	96 97	SD262977	Hu,Sim,Hew,N,W,B,Sy,Fel
76	Red Screes	34C: LD E	Wainwright	776	260	2,546	853	90	NY396087	Ma,Sim,Hew,N,W,B,Sy,Fel
77	Looking Steads (Glaramara)	34B: LD C&W		775	22	2,543	72	89 90	NY245101	N,sSim,B,Sy
78	Sail	34B: LD C&W	Wainwright	773	32	2,536	105	89 90	NY198202	Sim,Hew,N,W,B,Sy,Fel
79	Grey Friar	34D: LD S	Wainwright	773	78	2,536	256	89 90	NY260003	Sim,Hew,N,W,B,Sy,Fel
80	Wandope	34B: LD C&W	Wainwright	772	30	2,533	98	89 90	NY188197	Sim,Hew,N,W,B,Sy,Fel
81	Hopegill Head	34B: LD C&W	Wainwright	770	97	2,526	318	89 90	NY185221	Sim,Hew,N,sHu,W,B,Sy,Fel
82	Great How (Swirl Band)	34D: LD S		770	2	2,526	7	96 97	SD273999	B,Sy
83	Great Rigg	34C: LD E	Wainwright	766	31	2,513	102	90	NY355104	Sim,Hew,N,W,B,Sy,Fel
84	Stonesty Pike	34B: LD C&W		765	2	2,510	7	89 90	NY249041	B
85	Stony Cove Pike [Caudale]	34C: LD E	Wainwright	763	171	2,503	561	90	NY417100	Ma,Sim,Hew,N,W,B,Sy,Fel
86	Wetherlam	34D: LD S	Wainwright	763	145	2,503	476	89 90	NY288011	Hu,Sim,Hew,N,sMa,W,B,Sy,Fel
87	High Raise	34B: LD C&W	Wainwright	762	283	2,500	928	89 90	NY280095	Ma,Sim,Hew,N,W,B,Sy,Fel
88	Slight Side	34B: LD C&W	Wainwright	762	14	2,500	46	89 90	NY209050	W,B,Sy,Fel,xN
89	Pen	34B: LD C&W		762	10	2,500	33	89 90	NY221067	B,Sy,xN
90	Mardale Ill Bell	34C: LD E	Wainwright	760	10	2,493	33	90	NY447101	W,B,Sy,Fel,xN
91	Ill Bell	34C: LD E	Wainwright	757	124	2,484	407	90	NY436077	Hu,Sim,Hew,N,W,B,Sy,Fel
92	Hart Side	34C: LD E	Wainwright	756	23	2,480	75	90	NY359197	N,sSim,W,B,Sy,Fel
93	Sand Hill	34B: LD C&W		756	17	2,480	56	89 90	NY187218	N,B,Sy
94	Red Pike (Buttermere)	34B: LD C&W	Wainwright	755	40	2,477	131	89	NY160154	Sim,Hew,N,W,B,Sy,Fel
95	Caudale Moor - John Bell's Banner	34C: LD E		755	10	2,477	33	90	NY412100	B,Sy
96	Low Raise	34C: LD E		754	5	2,474	16	90	NY456137	B,Sy
97	Dale Head	34B: LD C&W	Wainwright	753	397	2,470	1,302	89 90	NY222153	Ma,Sim,Hew,N,W,B,Sy,Fel
98	Carl Side	34A: LD N	Wainwright	746	30	2,448	98	89 90	NY254280	Sim,Hew,N,W,B,Sy,Fel
99	Black Sails	34D: LD S		745	37	2,444	121	89 90	NY282007	Sim,Hew,N,B,Sy
100	High Crag	34B: LD C&W	Wainwright	744	35	2,441	115	89 90	NY180139	Sim,Hew,N,W,B,Sy,Fel
101	Buck Pike - Seathwaite Fell	34D: LD S		744	14	2,441	46	96 97	SD262972	B,Sy
102	Doddick Fell	34A: LD N		742	2	2,434	7	90	NY327277	B
103	Little Stand	34B: LD C&W		740	25	2,428	82	89 90	NY250033	N,sSim,B,Sy,Fel
104	The Knott	34C: LD E	Wainwright	739	13	2,425	43	90	NY437126	W,B,Sy,xN
105	Hobcarton Crag	34B: LD C&W		739	37	2,425	121	89 90	NY193220	Sim,Hew,N,B,Sy
106	Robinson	34B: LD C&W	Wainwright	737	161	2,418	528	89 90	NY201168	Ma,Sim,Hew,N,W,B,Sy,Fel
107	Seat Sandal	34C: LD E	Wainwright	737	152	2,417	498	90	NY344115	Ma,Sim,Hew,N,W,B,Sy,Fel
108	Harrison Stickle	34B: LD C&W	Wainwright	736	53	2,415	174	89 90	NY281074	Sim,Hew,N,W,B,Sy,Fel
109	Sergeant Man	34B: LD C&W	Wainwright	736	12	2,415	39	89 90	NY286088	W,B,Sy,Fel,xN
110	Combe Head	34B: LD C&W		735	28	2,411	92	89 90	NY249109	N,sSim,B,Sy
111	Jenkin Hill	34A: LD N		735	4	2,411	13	89 90	NY274274	B,Sy
112	Long Side	34A: LD N	Wainwright	734	40	2,408	131	89 90	NY248284	Sim,Hew,N,W,B,Sy,Fel
113	Thirdgill Head Man	34B: LD C&W		734	2	2,408	7	89 90	NY183196	B
114	Little Gowder Crag	34B: LD C&W		733	17	2,405	56	89	NY140109	N,B,Sy
115	Codale Head	34B: LD C&W		732	15	2,402	49	89 90	NY288090	N,B,Sy
116	Low White Stones	34B: LD C&W		731	4	2,398	13	89 90	NY282100	B
117	Kentmere Pike	34C: LD E	Wainwright	730	39	2,395	128	90	NY465077	Sim,Hew,N,W,B,Sy,Fel
118	Randerside	34C: LD E		729	9	2,392	30	90	NY348210	B,Sy
119	Hindscarth	34B: LD C&W	Wainwright	727	71	2,385	233	89 90	NY215165	Sim,Hew,N,W,B,Sy,Fel
120	Ullscarf	34B: LD C&W	Wainwright	726	118	2,382	387	89 90	NY291121	Hu,Sim,Hew,N,W,B,Sy,Fel
121	Clough Head	34C: LD E	Wainwright	726	108	2,382	354	90	NY333225	Hu,Sim,Hew,N,W,B,Sy,Fel
122	Birkett Fell	34C: LD E		725	2	2,379	7	90	NY364198	B
123	Thunacar Knott	34B: LD C&W	Wainwright	723	27	2,372	89	89 90	NY279079	N,sSim,W,B,Sy,Fel
124	Red Beck Top [Glaramara S]	34B: LD C&W		721	37	2,365	121	89 90	NY242097	Sim,Hew,N,B,Sy
125	Froswick	34C: LD E	Wainwright	720	75	2,362	246	90	NY435085	Sim,Hew,N,W,B,Sy,Fel
126	Whiteside East Top	34B: LD C&W		719	39	2,359	128	89 90	NY175221	Sim,Hew,N,B,Sy
127	Birkhouse Moor	34C: LD E	Wainwright	718	21	2,356	69	90	NY363159	N,sSim,W,B,Sy,Fel
128	Lonscale Fell	34A: LD N	Wainwright	715	50	2,346	164	89 90	NY285271	Sim,Hew,N,W,B,Sy,Fel
129	Brandreth	34B: LD C&W	Wainwright	715	61	2,346	200	89 90	NY214119	Sim,Hew,N,W,B,Sy,Fel
130	Branstree	34C: LD E	Wainwright	713	137	2,339	449	90	NY478099	Hu,Sim,Hew,N,W,B,Sy,Fel
131	Red Crag	34C: LD E		711	11	2,333	36	90	NY450151	B,Sy
132	Knott	34A: LD N	Wainwright	710	242	2,329	794	89 90	NY296329	Ma,Sim,Hew,N,W,B,Sy,Fel
133	Pike of Stickle	34B: LD C&W	Wainwright	709	54	2,326	177	89 90	NY273073	Sim,Hew,N,W,B,Sy,Fel
134	Whiteside West Top	34B: LD C&W	Wainwright	707	18	2,320	59	89 90	NY170219	N,W,B,Sy,Fel
135	Yoke	34C: LD E	Wainwright	706	38	2,316	125	90	NY437067	Sim,Hew,N,W,B,Sy,Fel
136	Pike of Blisco	34B: LD C&W	Wainwright	705	177	2,313	581	89 90	NY271042	Ma,Sim,Hew,N,W,B,Sy,Fel
137	Ladyside Pike	34B: LD C&W		703	28	2,306	92	89 90	NY184227	N,sSim,B,Sy
138	Lonscale Pike (East Top)	34A: LD N		703	8	2,306	26	89 90	NY288272	B,Sy
139	Gasgale Crags	34B: LD C&W		703	8	2,306	26	89 90	NY178222	B
140	Bowscale Fell	34A: LD N	Wainwright	702	87	2,303	285	90	NY333305	Sim,Hew,N,W,B,Sy,Fel
141	Cold Pike	34B: LD C&W	Wainwright	701	46	2,300	151	89 90	NY262036	Sim,Hew,N,W,B,Sy,Fel
142	Pavey Ark	34B: LD C&W	Wainwright	700	15	2,297	49	89 90	NY284079	N,W,B,Sy,Fel
143	Gray Crag	34C: LD E	Wainwright	699	16	2,293	52	90	NY427117	N,W,B,Sy,Fel
144	Grey Knotts	34B: LD C&W	Wainwright	697	16	2,287	52	89 90	NY217125	N,W,B,Sy,Fel
145	Caw Fell	34B: LD C&W	Wainwright	697	22	2,287	72	89	NY132109	N,sSim,W,B,Sy,Fel
146	Rest Dodd	34C: LD E	Wainwright	696	111	2,283	364	90	NY432136	Hu,Sim,Hew,N,W,B,Sy,Fel
147	Great Knott	34B: LD C&W		696	15	2,283	49	89 90	NY259042	N,B,Sy
148	Seatallan	34B: LD C&W	Wainwright	692	193	2,270	633	89	NY140084	Ma,Sim,Hew,N,W,B,Sy,Fel
149	Little Carrs	34D: LD S		692	7	2,270	23	89 90	NY270015	B,Sy
150	Ullock Pike	34A: LD N	Wainwright	690	14	2,264	46	89 90	NY244287	W,B,Sy,Fel,xN
151	Great Calva	34A: LD N	Wainwright	690	142	2,264	466	89 90	NY290311	Hu,Sim,Hew,N,sMa,W,B,Sy,Fel
152	High House Tarn Top ( Allen Crags)	34B: LD C&W		684	17	2,244	56	89 90	NY240092	N,B,Sy
153	Bannerdale Crags	34A: LD N	Wainwright	683	37	2,241	121	90	NY335290	Sim,Hew,N,W,B,Sy,Fel
154	Brown Pike	34D: LD S		682	12	2,238	39	96 97	SD260965	B,Sy,xN
155	Scales Fell	34A: LD N		682	11	2,238	36	90	NY331278	B,Sy
156	Little Harter Fell	34C: LD E		681	11	2,234	36	90	NY468094	B
157	Loft Crag	34B: LD C&W	Wainwright	680	22	2,231	72	89 90	NY277071	N,sSim,W,B,Sy,Fel
158	Sheffield Pike	34C: LD E	Wainwright	675	91	2,215	299	90	NY369181	Sim,Hew,N,sHu,W,B,Sy,Fel
159	Coldbarrow Fell - High Saddle	34B: LD C&W		675	–	2,215	–	89 90	NY289129	B
160	Bakestall	34A: LD N	Wainwright	673	7	2,208	23	89 90	NY266308	W,B,Sy,Fel
161	Branstree NE Top	34C: LD E		673	24	2,208	79	90	NY487103	N,sSim,B,Sy
162	Scar Crags	34B: LD C&W	Wainwright	672	55	2,205	180	89 90	NY208206	Sim,Hew,N,W,B,Sy,Fel
163	Loadpot Hill	34C: LD E	Wainwright	672	49	2,205	161	90	NY456180	Sim,Hew,N,W,B,Sy,Fel
164	Wether Hill	34C: LD E	Wainwright	671	5	2,201	16	90	NY455167	W,B,Sy,Fel,xN
165	Sale How	34A: LD N		666	18	2,185	59	89 90	NY276286	N,B,Sy
166	Adam Seat	34C: LD E		666	9	2,185	30	90	NY471090	B,Sy,xN
167	Tarn Crag (Bowscale E Top)	34A: LD N		665	14	2,182	46	90	NY340310	B,Sy,xN
168	Tarn Crag (Sleddale)	34C: LD E	Wainwright	664	160	2,178	525	90	NY488078	Ma,Sim,Hew,N,W,B,Sy,Fel
169	Carrock Fell	34A: LD N	Wainwright	663	91	2,175	299	90	NY341336	Sim,Hew,N,sHu,W,B,Sy,Fel
170	Hell Gill Pike	34D: LD S		662	1	2,172	3	89 90	NY269016	B
171	Whiteless Pike	34B: LD C&W	Wainwright	660	36	2,165	118	89 90	NY180189	Sim,Hew,N,W,B,Sy,Fel
172	Calfhow Pike	34C: LD E		660	9	2,165	30	90	NY330211	B,Sy,xN
173	High Pike (Caldbeck)	34A: LD N	Wainwright	658	69	2,159	226	90	NY318350	Sim,Hew,N,W,B,Sy,Fel
174	Place Fell	34C: LD E	Wainwright	657	262	2,156	860	90	NY405169	Ma,Sim,Hew,N,W,B,Sy,Fel
175	High Pike (Scandale)	34C: LD E	Wainwright	656	6	2,152	20	90	NY374088	W,B,Sy,Fel
176	Low Saddle	34B: LD C&W		656	21	2,152	69	89 90	NY288133	N,sSim,B,Sy
177	Selside Pike	34C: LD E	Wainwright	655	36	2,149	118	90	NY490111	Sim,Hew,N,W,B,Sy,Fel
178	Middle Dodd	34C: LD E	Wainwright	654	14	2,146	46	90	NY397095	W,B,Sy,Fel
179	Harter Fell (Eskdale)	34D: LD S	Wainwright	654	276	2,146	906	96	SD218997	Ma,Sim,Hew,N,W,B,Sy,Fel
180	High Spy	34B: LD C&W	Wainwright	653	148	2,143	485	89 90	NY234162	Hu,Sim,Hew,N,sMa,W,B,Sy,Fel
181	Great Sca Fell	34A: LD N	Wainwright	651	13	2,136	43	89 90	NY291339	W,B,Sy,Fel,xN
182	Rossett Pike	34B: LD C&W	Wainwright	651	40	2,136	131	89 90	NY249075	Sim,Hew,N,W,B,Sy,Fel
183	Fleetwith Pike	34B: LD C&W	Wainwright	649	118	2,129	388	89 90	NY205141	Hu,Sim,Hew,N,W,B,Sy,Fel
184	Base Brown	34B: LD C&W	Wainwright	646	38	2,119	125	89 90	NY225114	Sim,Hew,N,W,B,Sy,Fel
185	Little Calva	34A: LD N		642	15	2,106	49	89 90	NY282314	N,B,Sy
186	Thorn Crag	34B: LD C&W		642	10	2,106	33	89 90	NY279071	B,Sy
187	Dodd (Buttermere)	34B: LD C&W		641	20	2,103	66	89	NY163157	N,sSim,B,Sy
188	Iron Crag (Ennerdale Fell)	34B: LD C&W		640	54	2,100	177	89	NY123119	Sim,Hew,N,B,Sy,Fel
189	Grey Crag [Sleddale Fell]	34C: LD E	Wainwright	638	41	2,093	135	90	NY497072	Sim,Hew,N,W,B,Sy,Fel
190	Causey Pike	34B: LD C&W	Wainwright	637	40	2,090	131	89 90	NY218208	Sim,Hew,N,W,B,Sy,Fel
191	Little Hart Crag [West Top]	34C: LD E	Wainwright	637	34	2,090	112	90	NY387100	Sim,Hew,N,W,B,Sy,Fel
192	Harrop Pike	34C: LD E		637	16	2,090	52	90	NY500077	N,B,Sy
193	Hobcarton End	34B: LD C&W		634	15	2,080	49	89 90	NY195234	N,B,Sy
194	Honister Crag (Black Star)	34B: LD C&W		634	21	2,080	69	89 90	NY212141	N,sSim,B,Sy
195	Starling Dodd	34B: LD C&W	Wainwright	633	73	2,077	240	89	NY142157	Sim,Hew,N,W,B,Sy,Fel
196	Little Sca Fell	34A: LD N		633	9	2,077	30	89 90	NY289342	B,Sy
197	Seathwaite Fell (Great Slack)	34B: LD C&W		632	31	2,073	102	89 90	NY227097	Sim,Hew,N,B,Sy
198	Dovenest Top (Stonethwaite Fell)	34B: LD C&W		632	38	2,073	125	89 90	NY255113	Sim,Hew,N,B,Sy
199	Rough Crag (Riggindale)	34C: LD E		628	33	2,060	108	90	NY454112	Sim,Hew,N,B,Sy
200	Yewbarrow	34B: LD C&W	Wainwright	627	142	2,057	466	89 90	NY173084	Hu,Sim,Hew,N,sMa,W,B,Sy,Fel
201	Hare Stones	34A: LD N		627	16	2,057	52	90	NY315343	N,B,Sy
202	Looking Stead (Pillar)	34B: LD C&W		627	20	2,057	66	89 90	NY186117	N,sSim,B,Sy
203	Coomb Height	34A: LD N		627	6	2,057	20	90	NY310327	B,Sy
204	Goat Scar	34C: LD E		626	10	2,054	33	90	NY473069	B,Sy,xN
205	Frozen Fell	34A: LD N		625	–	2,051	–	89 90	NY287332	B
206	Birks	34C: LD E	Wainwright	622	20	2,041	66	90	NY380143	N,sSim,W,B,Sy,Fel
207	Walna Scar	34D: LD S	Outlying Fells	621	16	2,037	52	96	SD257963	N,WO,B,Sy,Fel
208	Heron Pike North Top (Rydal Fell)	34C: LD E		621	23	2,037	75	90	NY357086	N,sSim,B,Sy,Fel
209	Hartsop Dodd	34C: LD E	Wainwright	618	24	2,028	79	90	NY411118	N,sSim,W,B,Sy,Fel
210	Great Borne	34B: LD C&W	Wainwright	616	113	2,021	371	89	NY123163	Hu,Sim,Hew,N,W,B,Sy,Fel
211	Great Lingy Hill	34A: LD N		616	18	2,021	59	90	NY310339	N,B,Sy
212	Yewbarrow N	34B: LD C&W		616	33	2,021	108	89 90	NY175091	Sim,Hew,N,B,Sy
213	Heron Pike [Rydal]	34C: LD E	Wainwright	612	21	2,008	69	90	NY355083	N,sSim,W,B,Sy
214	Rosthwaite Fell	34B: LD C&W		612	24	2,008	79	89 90	NY255118	N,sSim,B,Sy
215	Heron Pike	34C: LD E		612	9	2,008	30	90	NY373178	B,Sy
216	Standing Crag	34B: LD C&W		611	1	2,005	3	89 90	NY296133	B,Sy
217	White Maiden	34D: LD S		610	23	2,001	75	96	SD254957	N,sSim,B,Sy
218	Brown Crag	34C: LD E		610	10	2,001	33	90	NY327176	B,Sy
219	Illgill Head	34B: LD C&W	Wainwright	609	314	1,998	1,030	89	NY168049	Ma,Sim,Dew,W,B,Sy,Fel
220	Miller Moss (Little Lingy Hill)	34A: LD N		609	19	1,998	62	90	NY303338	B,Sy,xN
221	High Seat	34B: LD C&W	Wainwright	608	136	1,995	446	89 90	NY287180	Hu,Sim,Dew,W,B,Sy,Fel
222	Miton Hill	34A: LD N		607	17	1,991	56	90	NY329341	B,Sy
223	Buck Pike (Mickleden)	34B: LD C&W		606	6	1,988	20	89 90	NY252077	B,Sy
224	Round Knott	34A: LD N		603	10	1,978	33	90	NY334337	B,Sy
225	Seathwaite Fell	34B: LD C&W	Wainwright	601	12	1,972	39	89 90	NY229101	W,B,Sy,Fel
226	Black Combe	34D: LD S	Outlying Fells	600	362	1,969	1,188	96	SD135854	Ma,Sim,Dew,WO,B,Sy,Fel
227	White Pike (Seathwaite)	34D: LD S		598	13	1,962	43	96	SD249955	B,Sy
228	Haystacks [Buttermere]	34B: LD C&W	Wainwright	597	78	1,959	256	89 90	NY193131	5,Dew,W,B,Sy,Fel
229	Burn Tod	34A: LD N		595	2	1,952	7	89 90	NY282328	B
230	St Raven's Edge	34C: LD E		593	40	1,946	131	90	NY406083	5,Dew,B,Sy
231	Great Yarlside	34C: LD E	Outlying Fells	591	6	1,939	20	90	NY525075	WO,B
232	Bleaberry Fell	34B: LD C&W	Wainwright	590	42	1,936	138	89 90	NY285195	5,Dew,W,B,Sy,Fel
233	Little Dodd (Ennerdale)	34B: LD C&W		590	9	1,936	30	89	NY149155	B,Sy
234	Black Crags (Mickleden)	34B: LD C&W		588	30	1,929	98	89 90	NY255080	5,Dew,B,Sy
235	Shipman Knotts	34C: LD E	Wainwright	587	11	1,926	36	90	NY472062	W,B,Sy,Fel
236	Black Combe South Top	34D: LD S		587	7	1,926	23	96	SD135851	B
237	Brae Fell	34A: LD N	Wainwright	586	14	1,923	46	89 90	NY288351	W,B,Sy,Fel
238	Middle Fell	34B: LD C&W	Wainwright	582	117	1,909	384	89	NY150072	Hu,5,Dew,W,B,Sy,Fel
239	Ard Crags	34B: LD C&W	Wainwright	581	116	1,906	381	89 90	NY206197	Hu,5,Dew,W,B,Sy,Fel
240	Hartsop Above How	34C: LD E	Wainwright	581	27	1,906	89	90	NY383120	s5,W,B,Sy,Fel
241	The Nab	34C: LD E	Wainwright	576	61	1,890	200	90	NY434151	5,Dew,W,B,Sy
242	Maiden Moor	34B: LD C&W	Wainwright	575	10	1,886	33	89 90	NY236181	W,B,Sy,Fel
243	High Brow	34C: LD E		575	24	1,886	79	90	NY367214	s5,B,Sy
244	Thornythwaite Fell	34B: LD C&W		574	3	1,883	10	89 90	NY245118	B,Sy
245	Blake Fell	34B: LD C&W	Wainwright	573	164	1,880	538	89	NY110196	Ma,5,Dew,W,B,Sy,Fel
246	Whitfell	34D: LD S	Outlying Fells	573	221	1,880	725	96	SD158929	Ma,5,Dew,WO,B,Sy,Fel
247	High Gait Crags	34B: LD C&W		572	13	1,877	43	89 90	NY230057	B,Sy
248	Low Kop	34C: LD E		572	3	1,877	10	90	NY474164	B,Sy
249	Sergeant's Crag	34B: LD C&W	Wainwright	571	45	1,873	148	89 90	NY273113	5,Dew,W,B,Sy,Fel
250	Outerside	34B: LD C&W	Wainwright	568	74	1,864	243	89 90	NY211214	5,Dew,W,B,Sy,Fel
251	White Stones - The Band	34B: LD C&W		568	16	1,864	52	89 90	NY260060	B,Sy
252	Angletarn Pikes N Top	34C: LD E	Wainwright	567	78	1,860	256	90	NY413148	5,Dew,W,B,Sy,Fel
253	Wasdale Pike	34C: LD E	Outlying Fells	565	5	1,854	16	90	NY536084	WO,B,Sy
254	Angletarn Pikes South Top	34C: LD E		565	20	1,854	66	90	NY414146	s5,B,Sy
255	Herdus	34B: LD C&W		562	3	1,844	10	89	NY117163	B,Sy
256	Brock Crags	34C: LD E	Wainwright	561	24	1,841	79	90	NY416136	s5,W,B,Sy,Fel
257	Seat	34B: LD C&W		561	31	1,841	102	89 90	NY185134	5,Dew,B,Sy
258	Great Saddle Crag	34C: LD E	Outlying Fells	560	2	1,837	7	90	NY526086	WO,B,Sy
259	Bell Crags (Long Moss)	34B: LD C&W		559	32	1,834	106	89 90	NY298143	5,Dew,B,Sy,Fel
260	Knott Rigg	34B: LD C&W	Wainwright	556	53	1,824	174	89 90	NY197188	5,Dew,W,B,Sy,Fel
261	Swinklebank Crag	34C: LD E	Outlying Fells	554	46	1,818	151	90	NY500049	5,Dew,WO,B,Sy
262	Steel Fell	34B: LD C&W	Wainwright	553	80	1,814	262	90	NY319111	5,Dew,W,B,Sy,Fel
263	The Tongue	34A: LD N		553	12	1,814	39	90	NY347301	B,Sy
264	Swineside Knott	34C: LD E		553	15	1,814	49	90	NY379197	B,Sy
265	Lord's Seat	34A: LD N	Wainwright	552	237	1,811	778	89 90	NY204265	Ma,5,Dew,W,B,Sy,Fel
266	Common Fell	34C: LD E		552	18	1,811	59	90	NY382204	B,Sy
267	The Knight	34C: LD E		552	6	1,811	20	90	NY404176	B,Sy
268	Rosthwaite Fell	34B: LD C&W	Wainwright	551	45	1,808	148	89 90	NY258124	5,Dew,W,B,Sy,Fel
269	Brown Hills	34C: LD E		551	11	1,808	36	90	NY377194	B,Sy
270	Meal Fell	34A: LD N	Wainwright	550	30	1,804	98	89 90	NY283337	5,Dew,W,B,Sy,Fel
271	Tarn Crag (Easedale)	34B: LD C&W	Wainwright	549	4	1,801	13	90	NY303093	W,B,Sy,Fel
272	Hard Knott	34B: LD C&W	Wainwright	549	154	1,801	505	89 90	NY231023	Ma,5,Dew,W,B,Sy,Fel
273	Buck Barrow	34D: LD S	Outlying Fells	549	72	1,801	236	96	SD151910	5,Dew,WO,B,Sy,Fel
274	Ill Crag (Newlands)	34B: LD C&W		546	16	1,791	52	89 90	NY199191	B,Sy
275	Wrynose Fell - Long Crag	34B: LD C&W		545	13	1,788	43	89 90	NY279039	B
276	Swarth Fell (Ullswater)	34C: LD E		545	5	1,788	16	90	NY454195	B
277	Carling Knott	34B: LD C&W		544	41	1,785	135	89	NY117203	5,Dew,B,Sy
278	Burn Moor	34D: LD S	Outlying Fells	543	23	1,781	75	96	SD151924	s5,WO,B,Sy
279	Lining Crag	34B: LD C&W		542	2	1,778	7	89 90	NY283112	B,Sy
280	Blea Rigg	34B: LD C&W	Wainwright	541	11	1,775	36	90	NY301078	W,B,Sy,Fel
281	Lank Rigg	34B: LD C&W	Wainwright	541	111	1,775	364	89	NY091119	Hu,5,Dew,W,B,Sy,Fel
282	Hare Crag	34A: LD N		538	12	1,765	39	89 90	NY277298	B,Sy
283	Calf Crag	34B: LD C&W	Wainwright	537	50	1,762	164	90	NY301104	5,Dew,W,B,Sy,Fel
284	Whin Rigg	34B: LD C&W	Wainwright	537	61	1,762	200	89	NY151035	5,Dew,W,B,Sy,Fel
285	Great Mell Fell	34C: LD E	Wainwright	537	198	1,762	650	90	NY396253	Ma,5,Dew,W,B,Sy,Fel
286	Kinmont Buck Barrow	34D: LD S	Outlying Fells	535	25	1,755	82	96	SD146909	s5,WO,B,Sy
287	Blake Rigg (Little Langdale)	34B: LD C&W		535	24	1,755	79	89 90	NY285039	s5,B,Sy
288	Arthur's Pike	34C: LD E	Wainwright	533	4	1,749	13	90	NY460206	W,B,Sy,Fel
289	Great Paddy Crag	34D: LD S		532	4	1,745	13	96	SD150908	B
290	High Wether Howe	34C: LD E	Outlying Fells	531	66	1,742	217	90	NY514109	5,Dew,WO,B,Sy
291	White Howe	34C: LD E	Outlying Fells	530	73	1,739	240	90	NY523041	5,Dew,WO,B,Sy
292	Caw	34D: LD S	Outlying Fells	529	132	1,736	433	96	SD230944	Hu,5,Dew,WO,B,Sy,Fel
293	High Crags (Newlands)	34B: LD C&W		529	11	1,736	36	89 90	NY217174	B,Sy
294	Brown Howe	34C: LD E		529	28	1,736	92	90	NY487121	s5,B,Sy
295	Birk Fell Man - Birk Fell	34D: LD S		529	14	1,736	46	89 90	NY295016	B,Sy
296	The Forest [BannisdaleH]	34C: LD E	Outlying Fells	528	40	1,732	131	90	NY527035	5,Dew,WO,B,Sy
297	Great Cockup	34A: LD N	Wainwright	526	90	1,726	295	89 90	NY273333	5,Dew,sHu,W,B,Sy,Fel
298	Gavel Fell	34B: LD C&W	Wainwright	526	75	1,726	246	89	NY116183	5,Dew,W,B,Sy,Fel
299	High Snockrigg	34B: LD C&W		526	45	1,726	148	89 90	NY186168	5,Dew,B,Sy
300	Eagle Crag	34B: LD C&W	Wainwright	525	27	1,722	89	89 90	NY275121	s5,W,B,Sy,Fel
301	Ullister Hill	34A: LD N		525	34	1,722	112	89 90	NY209260	5,Dew,B,Sy
302	Whinlatter Top	34A: LD N		525	58	1,722	190	89 90	NY196249	5,Dew,B,Sy
303	Demming Crag	34D: LD S		525	13	1,722	43	89 90	NY222002	B,Sy
304	Bonscale Pike	34C: LD E	Wainwright	524	1	1,719	3	90	NY453200	W,B,Sy,Fel
305	Lord's Seat	34C: LD E	Outlying Fells	524	36	1,719	118	90	NY518066	5,Dew,WO,B,Sy
306	Crag Fell	34B: LD C&W	Wainwright	523	114	1,716	374	89	NY097143	Hu,5,Dew,W,B,Sy,Fel
307	Souther Fell	34A: LD N	Wainwright	522	87	1,713	285	90	NY354291	5,Dew,W,B,Sy,Fel
308	Great How - Eskdale Fell	34B: LD C&W		522	51	1,713	167	89 90	NY197039	5,Dew,B,Sy,Fel
309	Border End	34B: LD C&W		522	22	1,713	72	89 90	NY228018	s5,B,Sy
310	High Hartsop Dodd	34C: LD E	Wainwright	519	3	1,703	10	90	NY393107	W,B,Sy,Fel
311	Loweswater End - Carling Knott	34B: LD C&W		519	7	1,703	23	89	NY120206	B
312	Little Yarlside	34C: LD E	Outlying Fells	518	11	1,699	36	90	NY530071	WO,B,Sy
313	Gale Fell	34B: LD C&W		518	8	1,699	26	89	NY133163	B
314	Whinlatter	34A: LD N	Wainwright	517	16	1,696	52	89 90	NY191251	W,B,Sy,Fel
315	Sallows	34C: LD E	Wainwright	516	69	1,693	226	90	NY436039	5,Dew,W,B,Sy,Fel
316	High Tove	34B: LD C&W	Wainwright	515	16	1,690	52	89 90	NY289165	W,B,Sy,Fel
317	Seat Robert	34C: LD E	Outlying Fells	515	30	1,690	98	90	NY526114	5,Dew,WO,B,Sy
318	Watendlath Fell (Long Moss)	34B: LD C&W		515	15	1,690	49	89 90	NY289148	B,Sy
319	Threlkeld Knotts	34C: LD E		514	18	1,686	59	90	NY330230	B,Sy
320	Capplebarrow	34C: LD E	Outlying Fells	513	22	1,683	72	90	NY508035	s5,WO,B,Sy
321	Mellbreak	34B: LD C&W	Wainwright	512	260	1,680	853	89	NY148186	Ma,5,Dew,W,B,Sy,Fel
322	Birk Fell	34C: LD E		512	29	1,680	96	90	NY402182	s5,B,Sy
323	Gale Crag	34C: LD E		512	13	1,680	43	90	NY392124	B,Sy
324	Broom Fell	34A: LD N	Wainwright	511	27	1,677	89	89 90	NY194271	s5,W,B,Sy,Fel
325	Whoap	34B: LD C&W		511	21	1,677	69	89	NY099128	s5,B,Sy
326	Hen Comb	34B: LD C&W	Wainwright	509	140	1,670	459	89	NY132181	Hu,5,Dew,sMa,W,B,Sy,Fel
327	Beda Fell	34C: LD E	Wainwright	509	61	1,670	200	90	NY428171	5,Dew,W,B,Sy,Fel
328	Lowthwaite Fell	34A: LD N		509	30	1,670	98	89 90	NY278347	5,Dew,B,Sy
329	Mellbreak North Top	34B: LD C&W		509	62	1,670	203	89	NY143194	5,Dew,B,Sy
330	Swinside	34B: LD C&W		509	6	1,670	20	89 90	NY176239	B
331	Low Pike	34C: LD E	Wainwright	508	18	1,667	59	90	NY373078	W,B,Sy,Fel
332	Wythburn Fell	34B: LD C&W		508	8	1,667	26	90	NY311125	B,Sy
333	Sleddale Pike	34C: LD E	Outlying Fells	506	6	1,660	20	90	NY535094	WO,B,Sy
334	Little Mell Fell	34C: LD E	Wainwright	505	226	1,657	741	90	NY423240	Ma,5,Dew,W,B,Sy,Fel
335	Cockup	34A: LD N		505	5	1,657	16	89 90	NY259314	B,Sy
336	Stone Arthur	34C: LD E	Wainwright	504	3	1,654	10	90	NY347092	W,B,Sy,Fel
337	Hare Shaw	34C: LD E	Outlying Fells	503	13	1,650	43	90	NY497131	WO,B,Sy
338	Dodd (Skiddaw)	34A: LD N	Wainwright	502	110	1,647	361	89 90	NY244273	Hu,5,Dew,W,B,Sy,Fel
339	Ulthwaite Rigg	34C: LD E	Outlying Fells	502	2	1,647	7	90	NY514093	WO,B,Sy
340	High Dodd	34C: LD E		501	48	1,644	157	90	NY415182	5,Dew,B,Sy
341	Castle How (Raw Pike)	34B: LD C&W		500	23	1,640	75	90	NY307075	s5,B,Sy
342	Yew Bank	34B: LD C&W		499	31	1,637	102	89 90	NY231030	4,B,Sy
343	Stainton Pike	34D: LD S	Outlying Fells	498	20	1,634	66	96	SD152942	s4,WO,B,Sy,Fel
344	Low How	34C: LD E		497	18	1,631	59	90	NY374215	B,Sy
345	High House Bank	34C: LD E	Outlying Fells	495	80	1,624	262	90	NY543048	4,WO,B,Sy
346	Seat How (Thornthwaite)	34A: LD N		495	6	1,624	20	89 90	NY213256	B,Sy
347	Yoadcastle	34D: LD S	Outlying Fells	494	57	1,621	187	96	SD156952	4,WO,B,Sy,Fel
348	Great Howe (Longsleddale)	34C: LD E		494	2	1,621	7	90	NY489064	B
349	Robin Hood	34C: LD E	Outlying Fells	493	30	1,617	98	90	NY530058	4,WO,B,Sy
350	Long Crag	34C: LD E	Outlying Fells	493	32	1,617	105	90	NY515052	4,WO,B,Sy
351	Tarbarrel Moss	34A: LD N		493	24	1,617	79	89 90	NY206253	s4,B,Sy
352	Shivery Knott	34B: LD C&W		491	9	1,611	30	89 90	NY288153	B
353	Whatshaw Common	34C: LD E	Outlying Fells	490	71	1,608	233	90	NY541061	4,WO,B,Sy
354	Woodend Height	34D: LD S	Outlying Fells	489	14	1,604	46	96	SD156954	WO,B,Sy
355	Bampton Fell	34C: LD E		489	36	1,604	118	90	NY487164	4,B,Sy
356	Green Crag	34D: LD S	Wainwright	489	144	1,603	472	96	SD200982	Hu,4,sMa,W,B,Sy,Fel
357	Grike	34B: LD C&W	Wainwright	488	37	1,601	121	89	NY084140	4,W,B,Sy,Fel
358	Gavel Fell - High Nook	34B: LD C&W		488	21	1,601	69	89	NY120189	B,Sy
359	High Scarth	34B: LD C&W		487	25	1,598	82	89 90	NY215043	B,Sy
360	Wansfell	34C: LD E		486	6	1,595	20	90	NY403052	B,Sy
361	Wansfell Pike	34C: LD E		484	31	1,589	101	90	NY394041	4,B,Sy
362	Middle Crag	34B: LD C&W		484	5	1,588	16	89 90	NY287157	B,Sy
363	Longlands Fell	34A: LD N	Wainwright	483	37	1,585	121	89 90	NY275354	4,W,B,Sy,Fel
364	Sour Howes	34C: LD E	Wainwright	483	35	1,585	115	90	NY427032	4,W,B,Sy
365	Sharp Knott	34B: LD C&W		482	14	1,581	46	89	NY106200	B,Sy
366	Gowbarrow Fell	34C: LD E	Wainwright	481	9	1,579	30	90	NY407218	W,B,Sy,Fel
367	Armboth Fell	34B: LD C&W		480	27	1,575	89	89 90	NY296159	B,Sy,Fel
368	Hesk Fell	34D: LD S	Outlying Fells	477	100	1,565	328	96	SD176946	Hu,4,WO,B,Sy,Fel
369	Glede Howe	34C: LD E		476	6	1,562	20	90	NY521120	B
370	Burnbank Fell	34B: LD C&W	Wainwright	475	22	1,558	72	89	NY110209	W,B,Sy
371	High Pen	34B: LD C&W		475	18	1,558	59	89	NY109188	B,Sy
372	Stoupdale Head	34D: LD S	Outlying Fells	472	26	1,549	85	96	SD151873	WO,B,Sy
373	Gowk Hill	34C: LD E		471	10	1,545	33	90	NY444166	B,Sy
374	Lingmoor Fell	34B: LD C&W	Wainwright	470	248	1,542	814	90	NY302046	Ma,4,W,B,Sy,Fel
375	Barf	34A: LD N	Wainwright	469	38	1,539	125	89 90	NY214267	4,W,B,Sy,Fel
376	The Pikes	34D: LD S	Outlying Fells	469	41	1,539	135	96	SD237947	4,WO,B,Sy
377	Crook Crag	34D: LD S		469	54	1,539	177	96	SD200987	4,B,Sy
378	Powleys Hill	34C: LD E		465	5	1,526	16	90	NY504135	B,Sy
379	White Hause	34A: LD N		464	4	1,522	13	89 90	NY271323	B
380	Brown Rigg	34B: LD C&W		463	31	1,519	102	90	NY305146	4,B,Sy
381	Raven Crag	34B: LD C&W	Wainwright	461	44	1,512	144	90	NY303187	4,W,B,Sy,Fel
382	Graystones	34A: LD N		456	78	1,496	256	89 90	NY177264	4,B,Sy,Fel
383	Banna Fell	34B: LD C&W		456	38	1,496	125	89	NY115174	4,B,Sy
384	Barrow	34B: LD C&W	Wainwright	455	71	1,493	233	89 90	NY227218	4,W,B,Sy,Fel
385	Dodd (Lorton)	34B: LD C&W		454	39	1,490	128	89	NY169230	4,B,Sy
386	Red Knott	34B: LD C&W		452	2	1,483	7	89 90	NY221179	B
387	Catbells	34B: LD C&W	Wainwright	451	87	1,480	285	89 90	NY244198	4,W,B,Sy,Fel
388	Floutern Cop	34B: LD C&W		451	27	1,480	89	89	NY122173	B,Sy
389	Nab Scar	34C: LD E	Wainwright	450	2	1,476	7	90	NY355072	W,B,Sy,Fel
390	Great Crag	34B: LD C&W	Wainwright	449	32	1,473	105	89 90	NY270146	4,W,B,Sy,Fel
391	Plough Fell	34D: LD S		448	13	1,470	43	96	SD161911	B,Sy
392	Binsey	34A: LD N	Wainwright	447	242	1,467	794	89 90	NY225355	Ma,4,W,B,Sy,Fel
393	Murton Fell [Knock Murton]	34B: LD C&W		447	140	1,467	459	89	NY094190	Hu,4,sMa,B,Sy,Fel
394	Stile End	34B: LD C&W		447	35	1,467	115	89 90	NY220219	4,B,Sy
395	The Benn (Sippling Crag)	34B: LD C&W		446	51	1,462	166	90	NY302193	4,B,Sy
396	Capple Howe	34C: LD E		445	5	1,460	16	90	NY432028	B,Sy
397	Brownthwaite Crag	34C: LD E		444	26	1,457	85	90	NY443173	B,Sy
398	Birker Fell	34D: LD S		444	31	1,457	102	96	SD204974	4,B,Sy
399	Glenridding Dodd	34C: LD E	Wainwright	442	45	1,450	148	90	NY380175	4,W,B,Sy,Fel
400	White Pike	34D: LD S	Outlying Fells	442	17	1,450	56	96	SD150956	WO,B,Sy
401	Hawk Rigg	34D: LD S		441	11	1,447	36	89 90	NY299014	B
402	Glade How	34B: LD C&W		440	9	1,444	30	89	NY133064	B
403	Scar Lathing	34B: LD C&W		439	27	1,440	89	89 90	NY226049	B,Sy
404	Green Hill - Gowbarrow Park	34C: LD E		439	5	1,440	16	90	NY408209	B
405	Kirk Fell (Lorton)	34A: LD N		438	15	1,437	49	89 90	NY172265	B,Sy
406	Great Meldrum	34C: LD E		437	41	1,434	135	90	NY414223	4,B,Sy
407	Naddle High Forest	34C: LD E	Outlying Fells	435	28	1,427	92	90	NY492143	WO,B,Sy
408	Low Pen	34B: LD C&W		435	5	1,427	16	89	NY104189	B
409	Kitty Crag	34D: LD S		435	27	1,427	89	96 97	SD295989	B,Sy
410	Arnison Crag	34C: LD E	Wainwright	433	32	1,421	105	90	NY393149	4,W,B,Sy,Fel
411	Wallow Crag	34C: LD E	Outlying Fells	433	27	1,421	89	90	NY496149	WO,B,Sy
412	Rowling End	34B: LD C&W		433	6	1,421	20	89 90	NY229206	B,Sy
413	Horsehow Crags	34D: LD S		433	20	1,421	66	89 90	NY224008	B,Sy
414	Steel Knotts	34C: LD E	Wainwright	432	51	1,417	167	90	NY440181	4,W,B,Sy,Fel
415	High Fell (Hawk Rigg)	34D: LD S		428	20	1,404	66	90	NY300017	B,Sy
416	Brunt Knott	34C: LD E	Outlying Fells	427	21	1,401	69	90	NY484006	WO,B,Sy
417	Great Worm Crag	34D: LD S	Outlying Fells	427	34	1,401	112	96	SD194968	4,WO,B,Sy,Fel
418	Lingmell (Ennerdale)	34B: LD C&W		427	2	1,401	7	89	NY141131	B
419	Great Whinscale	34D: LD S		427	5	1,401	16	96	SD198989	B
420	Hollow Moor	34C: LD E	Outlying Fells	426	78	1,398	256	90	NY469040	4,WO,B,Sy
421	Lad Hows	34B: LD C&W		426	4	1,398	13	89 90	NY171192	B,Sy
422	Naddle Low Forest	34C: LD E		426	17	1,398	56	90	NY502149	B,Sy
423	Eskdale Fell - Whinscales	34B: LD C&W		425	5	1,394	16	89 90	NY197033	B
424	Watermillock Fell (Little Mell Fell South Top)	34C: LD E		424	40	1,391	131	90	NY424233	4,B,Sy
425	Low Fell	34B: LD C&W	Wainwright	423	266	1,388	873	89	NY137226	Ma,4,W,B,Sy,Fel
426	Buckbarrow	34B: LD C&W	Wainwright	423	4	1,388	13	89	NY135061	W,B,Sy,Fel
427	Blake Rigg (Tilberthwaite)	34D: LD S		423	20	1,388	66	90	NY301011	B,Sy
428	Haystacks (Tilberthwaite)	34D: LD S		423	19	1,388	62	90	NY300013	B
429	Stoneside Hill	34D: LD S		422	28	1,385	92	96	SD145892	B,Sy
430	Fisher Crag	34B: LD C&W		421	18	1,381	59	90	NY304163	B,Sy
431	Long Crag - Yewdale Fells	34D: LD S		421	11	1,381	36	96 97	SD298989	B
432	Gibson Knott	34B: LD C&W	Wainwright	420	10	1,378	33	90	NY316100	W,B,Sy,Fel
433	White Combe	34D: LD S	Outlying Fells	417	4	1,368	13	96	SD154862	WO,B
434	Fellbarrow [Mosser Fell]	34B: LD C&W	Wainwright	416	52	1,365	169	89	NY132242	4,W,B,Sy,Fel
435	Grange Fell	34B: LD C&W	Wainwright	416	38	1,365	125	89 90	NY264162	4,W,B,Sy,Fel
436	Four Stones Hill	34C: LD E		415	15	1,362	49	90	NY491162	B,Sy
437	Harper Hills	34C: LD E	Outlying Fells	414	5	1,358	16	90	NY510144	WO,B,Sy
438	Lang How	34B: LD C&W		414	28	1,358	92	90	NY318070	B,Sy
439	Loweswater Fell	34B: LD C&W		412	12	1,352	39	89	NY135222	B,Sy
440	Scope End	34B: LD C&W		412	5	1,352	16	89 90	NY224183	B,Sy
441	Sourfoot Fell	34B: LD C&W		411	34	1,348	112	89	NY134233	4,B,Sy
442	Swinescar Pike	34B: LD C&W		411	18	1,348	59	90	NY314070	B,Sy
443	High Wythow	34D: LD S		410	10	1,345	33	96 97	SD300990	B
444	Owsen Fell	34B: LD C&W		409	22	1,342	72	89	NY100209	B,Sy
445	Great Intake - Low Fell	34D: LD S		408	47	1,339	154	90	NY302021	4,B,Sy
446	Helm Crag	34B: LD C&W	Wainwright	405	70	1,329	230	90	NY326093	4,W,B,Sy,Fel
447	Castle Crag (Shoulthwalte)	34B: LD C&W		404	12	1,325	39	89 90	NY299188	B,Sy
448	Throstlehow Crag	34B: LD C&W		404	36	1,325	118	89 90	NY227043	4,B,Sy
449	Little Meldrum	34C: LD E		404	19	1,325	62	90	NY422227	B,Sy
450	Todd Fell	34C: LD E	Outlying Fells	401	20	1,316	66	90	NY512020	WO,B,Sy
451	Little Cockup	34A: LD N		399	7	1,309	23	89 90	NY261337	B
452	Whiteside Pike	34C: LD E	Outlying Fells	397	47	1,302	154	90	NY520015	3,WO,B,Sy
453	Dawsonground Crags	34B: LD C&W		397	23	1,302	75	89 90	NY203026	B,Sy
454	Silver How	34B: LD C&W	Wainwright	395	31	1,296	102	90	NY324066	3,W,B,Sy,Fel
455	Irton Fell	34B: LD C&W		395	12	1,296	39	89	NY143025	B,Sy
456	Silverybield	34B: LD C&W		395	27	1,296	89	89 90	NY221039	B,Sy
457	Castle Crag (Mardale)	34C: LD E		395	4	1,296	13	90	NY469127	B
458	King's How - Grange Fell	34B: LD C&W		392	66	1,286	217	89 90	NY258166	3,B,Sy
459	Smithy Fell	34B: LD C&W		392	22	1,286	72	89	NY133237	B,Sy
460	Darling Fell	34B: LD C&W		392	47	1,286	154	89	NY129225	3,B,Sy
461	Blakeley Raise	34B: LD C&W		389	32	1,276	105	89	NY069135	3,B,Sy
462	Hallin Fell	34C: LD E	Wainwright	388	163	1,273	535	90	NY433198	Ma,3,W,B,Sy,Fel
463	Round How	34C: LD E		387	26	1,270	85	90	NY391208	B,Sy
464	Hatteringill Head - Whin Fell	34B: LD C&W		385	21	1,263	69	89	NY133247	B,Sy
465	Fox Haw	34D: LD S		385	69	1,263	226	96	SD223936	3,B,Sy
466	Pinnacle Howe	34C: LD E		383	26	1,257	85	90	NY497166	B,Sy
467	Walla Crag	34B: LD C&W	Wainwright	379	24	1,243	79	89 90	NY276212	W,B,Sy,Fel
468	Sleet Fell	34C: LD E		378	8	1,240	26	90	NY422188	B,Sy
469	Heughscar Hill	34C: LD E	Outlying Fells	375	48	1,230	157	90	NY488231	3,WO,B,Sy
470	Stickle Pike	34D: LD S	Outlying Fells	375	116	1,230	381	96	SD212927	Hu,3,WO,B,Sy,Fel
471	Kinniside	34B: LD C&W		375	16	1,230	52	89	NY078116	B,Sy
472	Kinn	34B: LD C&W		374	17	1,227	56	89 90	NY219232	B,Sy
473	Ling Fell	34A: LD N	Wainwright	373	97	1,224	318	89 90	NY179285	3,sHu,W,B,Sy,Fel
474	Bracken How	34C: LD E		373	21	1,224	69	90	NY392210	B,Sy
475	Low Birk Fell	34C: LD E		373	15	1,224	49	90	NY410190	B
476	Broad Crag - Birker Fell	34D: LD S		372	12	1,220	39	96	SD195978	B
477	Low Wythow	34D: LD S		372	12	1,220	39	96 97	SD302992	B
478	The Pike	34D: LD S	Outlying Fells	370	73	1,214	240	96	SD186934	3,WO,B,Sy
479	Latrigg	34A: LD N	Wainwright	368	73	1,207	240	89 90	NY279247	3,W,B,Sy,Fel
480	Lamb Pasture	34C: LD E	Outlying Fells	367	29	1,204	95	90	NY534020	WO,B,Sy
481	Godworth	34B: LD C&W		365	19	1,198	62	89	NY100182	B,Sy
482	Cocklaw Fell	34C: LD E		365	5	1,198	16	90	NY480038	B,Sy
483	Troutbeck Tongue	34C: LD E	Wainwright	364	73	1,194	240	90	NY422064	3,W,B,Sy,Fel
484	Brackeny Crag	34D: LD S		364	22	1,194	72	96 97	SD303998	B
485	Little Dodd (Loweswater)	34B: LD C&W		362	6	1,188	20	89	NY131192	B,Sy
486	Side Pike	34B: LD C&W		362	57	1,188	187	89 90	NY293053	3,B,Sy
487	Raven's Crag Stickle Pike	34D: LD S	Outlying Fells	361	29	1,184	95	96	SD223929	WO,B,Sy
488	Sale Fell	34A: LD N	Wainwright	359	137	1,178	449	89 90	NY194296	Hu,3,W,B,Sy,Fel
489	Whin Crag (Eskdale)	34B: LD C&W		358	3	1,175	10	89 90	NY200023	B
490	High Rigg	34C: LD E	Wainwright	357	189	1,171	620	90	NY308219	Ma,3,W,B,Sy,Fel
491	Rannerdale Knotts	34B: LD C&W	Wainwright	355	66	1,165	217	89	NY167182	3,W,B,Sy,Fel
492	Latter Barrow	34B: LD C&W		354	13	1,161	43	89	NY074114	B,Sy
493	High Pike Haw	34D: LD S		354	14	1,161	46	96 97	SD263949	B,Sy
494	Orthwaite Bank	34A: LD N		348	7	1,142	23	89 90	NY256334	B
495	Eycott Hill	34A: LD N		345	26	1,132	85	90	NY386294	B,Sy
496	Lothwaite	34A: LD N		345	27	1,132	89	89 90	NY203296	B,Sy
497	Swainson Knott	34B: LD C&W		345	132	1,132	433	89	NY079083	Hu,3,B,Sy
498	High Rigg (South Top)	34C: LD E		343	16	1,125	52	90	NY307214	B,Sy
499	Brock Barrow	34D: LD S		343	29	1,125	95	96	SD220942	B,Sy
500	Knipescar Common	34C: LD E	Outlying Fells	342	8	1,122	26	90	NY526191	WO,B,Sy
501	Castle Rock	34C: LD E		339	29	1,112	95	90	NY321196	B,Sy
502	Scalebarrow Knott	34C: LD E	Outlying Fells	338	9	1,109	30	90	NY519153	WO,B,Sy
503	Scale Knott	34B: LD C&W		338	10	1,109	33	89	NY149177	B,Sy
504	Skelgill Bank	34B: LD C&W		338	14	1,109	46	89 90	NY244205	B,Sy
505	Boat How	34B: LD C&W	Outlying Fells	337	79	1,106	259	89 90	NY177034	3,WO,B,Sy,Fel
506	Loughrigg Fell	34B: LD C&W	Wainwright	335	172	1,099	564	90	NY346051	Ma,3,W,B,Sy,Fel
507	Rivings	34A: LD N		335	15	1,099	49	89 90	NY197294	B,Sy
508	Swarth Fell (Kinniside)	34B: LD C&W		335	37	1,099	121	89	NY064120	3,B,Sy
509	Top o' Selside	34D: LD S	Outlying Fells	334	5	1,096	16	96 97	SD308918	WO,B
510	Great How (Thirlmere)	34B: LD C&W		333	141	1,093	462	90	NY313187	Hu,3,sMa,B,Sy
511	Watches	34A: LD N		333	8	1,093	26	89 90	NY240303	B,Sy
512	Bowness Knott	34B: LD C&W		333	41	1,093	135	89	NY112155	3,B,Sy
513	Birker Fell - Great Crag	34D: LD S		333	21	1,093	69	96	SD186978	B
514	Little Eycott Hill	34A: LD N		332	12	1,089	39	90	NY385300	B,Sy
515	The Knott [Stainton Fell]	34D: LD S	Outlying Fells	331	17	1,086	56	96	SD143951	WO,B,Sy
516	Bigert	34D: LD S		331	11	1,086	36	96	SD176932	B
517	Brown How (Ennerdale)	34B: LD C&W		330	17	1,083	56	89	NY115158	B,Sy
518	Great Bank	34B: LD C&W		329	13	1,079	43	89	NY143019	B,Sy
519	Kepple Crag	34D: LD S		328	29	1,076	95	96	SD198999	B,Sy
520	Black Fell	34D: LD S	Wainwright	323	126	1,060	413	90	NY340015	Hu,3,W,B,Sy,Fel
521	Stone Pike	34B: LD C&W		322	1	1,056	3	89	NY078078	B
522	Arnsbarrow Hill	34D: LD S		322	22	1,056	72	96 97	SD311911	B,Sy
523	Gummer's How	34D: LD S	Outlying Fells	321	217	1,053	712	96 97	SD390884	Ma,3,WO,B,Sy
524	Green How - Aughertree Fell	34A: LD N		321	34	1,053	112	89 90	NY258374	3,B,Sy
525	Burn Edge	34B: LD C&W		320	22	1,050	72	89	NY069125	B,Sy
526	Rough Crag (Birker Moor)	34D: LD S	Outlying Fells	319	70	1,047	230	96	SD161977	3,WO,B,Sy
527	Burthwaite Heights	34A: LD N		318	15	1,043	49	89 90	NY188283	B,Sy
528	Birch Fell	34D: LD S		318	41	1,043	135	96 97	SD395891	3,B,Sy
529	Holme Fell	34D: LD S	Wainwright	317	165	1,040	541	90	NY315006	Ma,3,W,B,Sy,Fel
530	Stang Hill	34D: LD S		316	16	1,037	52	96 97	SD309908	B,Sy
531	Ponsonby Fell	34B: LD C&W	Outlying Fells	315	34	1,033	112	89	NY081070	3,WO,B,Sy
532	Carron Crag	34D: LD S	Outlying Fells	314	66	1,030	217	96 97	SD325943	3,WO,B,Sy
533	Tarn Hill	34D: LD S	Outlying Fells	313	32	1,027	105	96	SD209920	3,WO,B,Sy
534	High Hows (Lamplugh)	34B: LD C&W		313	43	1,027	141	89	NY096202	3,B,Sy
535	Goat Crag	34B: LD C&W		312	36	1,024	118	89 90	NY204017	3,B,Sy
536	Seat How (Birker Moor)	34D: LD S	Outlying Fells	311	58	1,020	190	96	SD165971	3,WO,B,Sy
537	Kelton Fell	34B: LD C&W		311	19	1,020	62	89	NY094181	B,Sy
538	Wren Crag	34C: LD E		311	21	1,020	69	90	NY315201	B
539	White Hall Knott	34D: LD S		311	19	1,020	62	96	SD155855	B,Sy
540	Water Crag	34D: LD S	Outlying Fells	305	36	1,001	118	96	SD153974	3,WO,B,Sy
541	Great Stickle	34D: LD S	Outlying Fells	305	27	1,001	89	96	SD211915	WO,B,Sy

== Wainwrights that are not Birketts ==
This list is from the Database of British and Irish Hills ("DoBIH") in October 2018, and are five Lake District peaks the DoBIH marks as being Wainwrights ("W"), but not Birketts ("B"). The DoBIH updates their measurements as more surveys are recorded, so these tables should not be amended or updated unless the entire DoBIH data is re-downloaded again.

Wainwrights that are not Birketts, ranked by height (DoBIH, October 2018)
Height Rank	Name	Section	Wainwright	Height (m)	Height (ft)	Prom. (m)	Prom. (ft)	Topo Map	OS Grid Reference	§ DoBIH codes
1	Mungrisdale Common	34A: LD N	Wainwright	633	2,077	2	6.5	90	NY310292	W,
2	Castle Crag	34B: LD C&W	Wainwright	290	951	75	246	89 90	NY249159	2,W,Sy,Fel

== Bibliography ==
- Bill Birkett (2002). Complete Lakeland Fells: Over 120 Classic Walks to all Fell Tops. 978-0007136292. ISBN 978-0007136292.
- Bill Birkett (1997). The Lakeland Fells Almanac. Neil Wilson Publishing. ISBN 978-1897784594.
- Bill Birkett (1994). Complete Lakeland Fells. Carnival. ISBN 978-0583333672.

== DoBIH codes ==
The DoBIH uses the following codes for the various classifications of mountains and hills in the British Isles, which many of the above peaks also fall into:

- Ma Marilyn
- Hu HuMP
- Sim Simm
- 5 Dodd
- M Munro
- MT Munro Top
- F Furth
- C Corbett
- G Graham
- D Donald
- DT Donald Top
- Hew Hewitt
- N Nuttall
- Dew Dewey
- DDew Donald Dewey
- HF Highland Five
- 4 400-499m Tump
- 3 300-399m Tump (GB)
- 2 200-299m Tump (GB)
- 1 100-199m Tump (GB)
- 0 0-99m Tump (GB)
- W Wainwright
- WO Wainwright Outlying Fell
- B Birkett
- Sy Synge
- Fel Fellranger
- CoH County Top – Historic (pre-1974)
- CoA County Top – Administrative (1974 to mid-1990s)
- CoU County Top – Current County or Unitary Authority
- CoL County Top – Current London Borough
- SIB Significant Island of Britain
- Dil Dillon
- A Arderin
- VL Vandeleur-Lynam
- MDew Myrddyn Dewey
- O Other list (which includes):
  - Bin Binnion
  - Bg Bridge
  - BL Buxton & Lewis
  - Ca Carn
  - CT Corbett Top
  - GT Graham Top
  - Mur Murdo
  - P500 P500
  - P600 P600
- Un unclassified

prefixes:
- s sub
- x deleted

suffixes:
= twin

== See also ==
- List of mountains of the British Isles by height
- List of mountains of the British Isles by prominence
- Lists of mountains and hills in the British Isles
- List of Wainwrights in the Lake District
- List of hill passes of the Lake District
- The Outlying Fells of Lakeland
