= Green Crag =

Fell in Cumbria, England

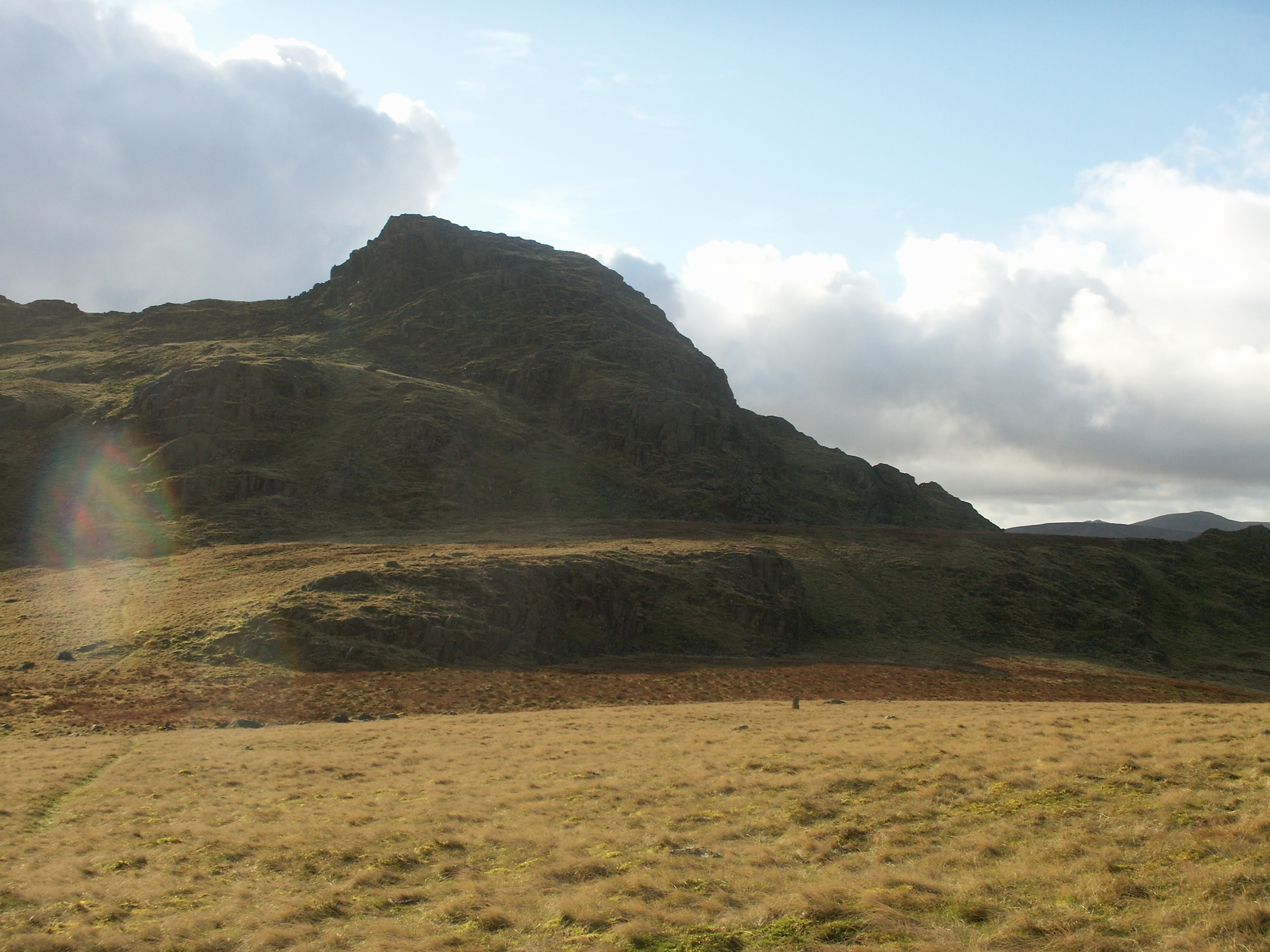
- Summit of Green Grag from the plateau to the north

Highest point
- Elevation: 489 m (1,604 ft)
- Prominence: c. 145 m
- Parent peak: Harter Fell
- Listing: Wainwright
- Coordinates: 54°22′26″N 3°13′57″W

Geography
- Location within the Lake District Location within the former Borough of Copeland
- Location: Cumbria, England
- Parent range: Lake District, Southern Fells
- OS grid: SD200982
- Topo map: OS Landranger 89,90, Explorer OL6

Green Crag is a fell in the English Lake District. It stands between Eskdale and the Duddon valley in the Southern Fells.

The northern slopes of Green Crag are in the civil parish of Eskdale, while the southern slopes are in the civil parish of Ulpha. Both are in the unitary authority area of Cumberland and the ceremonial county of Cumbria.

== Topography ==
The headwaters of Eskdale and the Duddon are separated by a ridge falling south west from the summit of Crinkle Crags. This line of high ground continues over many twists and turns for 15 miles, finally meeting the sea on the slopes of Black Combe. From Crinkle Crags the first fells on this ridge are Hard Knott, Harter Fell and Green Crag. Alfred Wainwright considered the remainder of the range unworthy of inclusion in his influential Pictorial Guide to the Lakeland Fells, stating that "south and west from Green Crag the scenery quickly deteriorates. This summit has therefore been taken as the boundary of fellwalking country." Later guidebook writers have disagreed, adding Great Worm Crag, Yoadcastle, Whitfell, Buck Barrow, Black Combe and the low hills around Devoke Water to their hill lists. Wainwright himself later relented and included these lesser hills in a supplementary volume, The Outlying Fells of Lakeland.

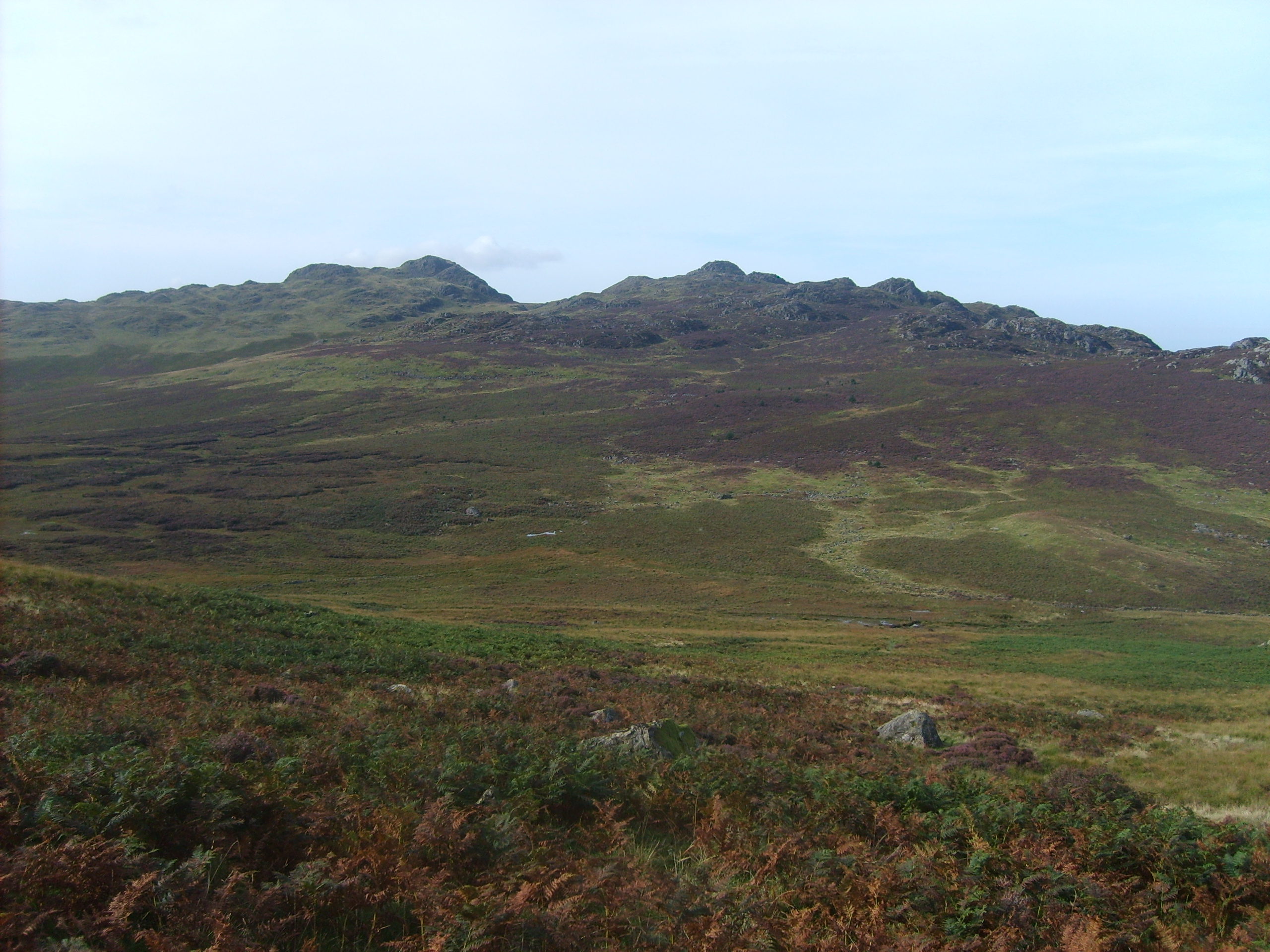
Green Crag as seen from Harter Fell, the true summit is just left of centre.

Green Crag is the highest of a series of rocky tops which stand out from the Birker Fell moorland. Running from north to south these outcrops present a fine serrated skyline when viewed from Eskdale. Birker Fell itself is roughly square and about two miles across, with Eskdale to the north and the River Duddon to the south.

Above the wooded valley of Eskdale there is a skirt of crags before the open moor is reached. Over this edge tumble the waterfalls of Stanley Force and Birker Force, the former easily reached by made paths from the road. The farmers of Eskdale once extracted peat from the plateau and the remains of graded paths and peat huts can still be found on the fellside. On this flank the remains of Gate Gill iron mine can also be found. Haematite was won from a number of levels here in the 1880s. The Duddon flanks have shallower gradients, divided by dry stone walls into long strips of pasture land. This rough grazing supports a series of farms along the valley between Ulpha and Seathwaite.

To the east of Green Crag is a marshy depression before the ground rises again to Harter Fell. The western boundary is formed by the Birker Fell Road, an unenclosed route from Ulpha to Eskdale Green with fine views of the Scafells. Summiting at 885 ft with hairpin climbs at either end, the road is frequently closed in winter by snow and ice. Beyond the road the moorland climbs via Seat How to the summit of Yoadcastle. From here it turns south, forming a more definite ridge on the long march to Black Combe.

The high point of the fell lies on a line of tors which break through the peat and fellgrass toward the east of the plateau. Travelling south from the Eskdale rim the tops are Kepple Crag, Great Whinscale, Crook Crag (1,538 ft), Green Crag and White How. The crest then turns west toward the Fell Road, passing over Great Worm Crag (1,400 ft), considered by some to be a separate fell. To the west of the summit ridge is Low Birker Pool, a tarn which feeds Birker Force. This shallow waterbody is contained by a low moraine and overlooked by Tarn Crag.

== Geology ==
The summit knoll is formed by plagioclase-phyric andesite lavas of the Birker Fell Formation of the Borrowdale Volcanic Group.

== Summit ==
The summit of Green Crag is composed of naked rock and the ordinary walker will only find access from the north or west, mild scrambling being required. The view from the small cairn on the summit gives a fine prospect of the southern fells, together with a sight of the sea due south.

== Ascents ==
Green Crag can be climbed from the Birker Fell Road, where there are some suitable off-road spaces for parking. From Eskdale the best access is via the sled gate (i.e. path used for dragging peat on sleds) which climbs near Birker Force. The plateau can also be reached in the vicinity of Kepple Crag. From the Duddon there are waymarked paths through the conifer plantations, beginning at the various Forestry car-parks.
