= Woolpack walk =

Challenge walk in the Lake District, England

Coordinates: 54°23′52″N 3°14′55″W

The route of the Woolpack Walk

The Woolpack Walk is a challenge walk which starts and finishes at Woolpack Inn, Eskdale, in the Lake District of England. The route covers 30 km (18.6 mi) and takes in 2,040 m (6,693 ft) of ascent.

== Route ==
The route is generally tackled clockwise, taking in the following summits:

- Slight Side
- Sca Fell
- Scafell Pike
- Broad Crag
- Ill Crag
- Esk Pike
- Bow Fell
- Crinkle Crags
- Hard Knott
- Harter Fell

== See also ==
- Bob Graham Round
