= Harter Fell (Eskdale) =

Fell in the Lake District, Cumbria, England

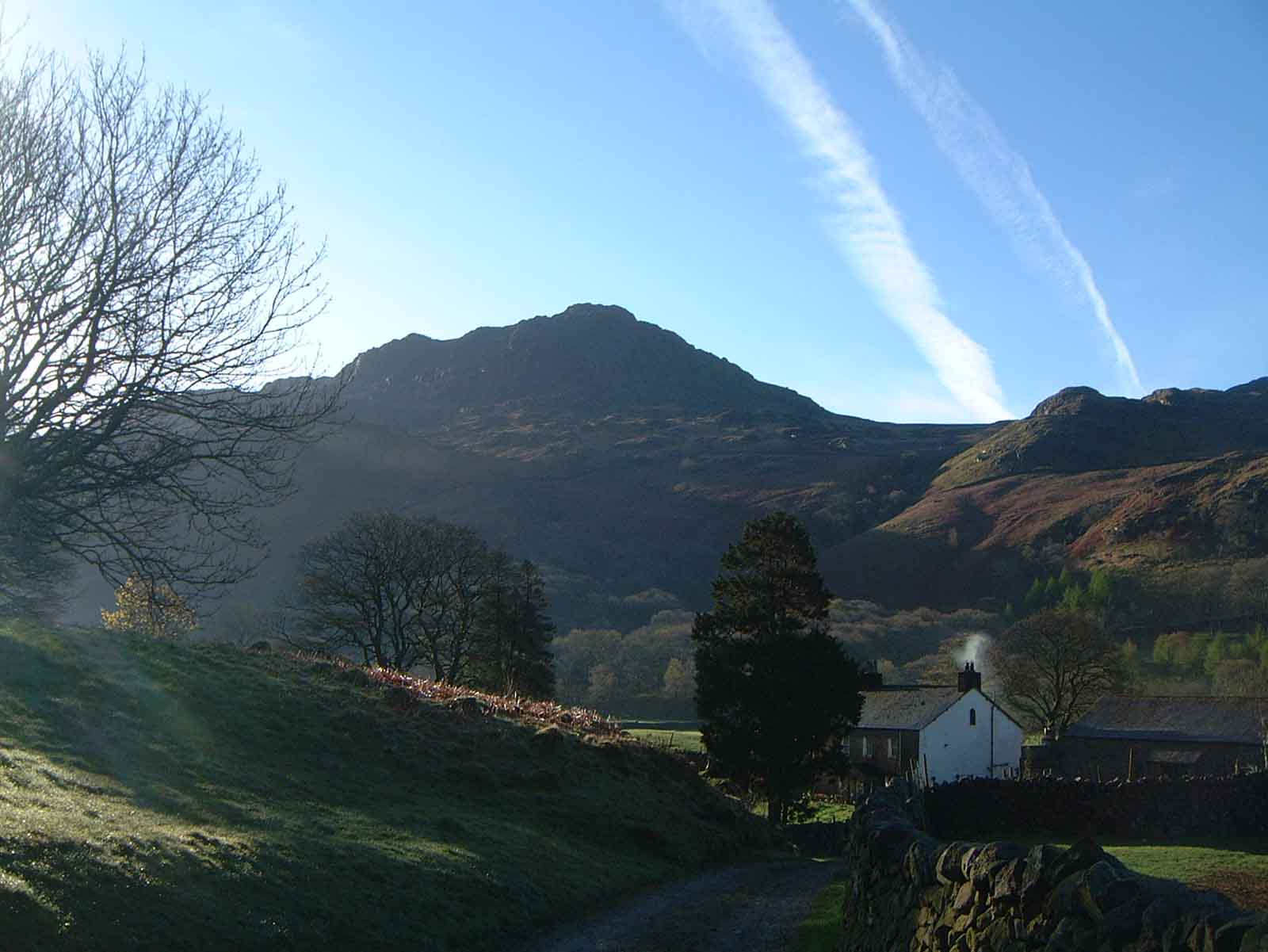
- Harter Fell as seen from Wha House Farm in Eskdale

Highest point
- Elevation: 653 m (2,142 ft)
- Prominence: 276 m (906 ft)
- Parent peak: Scafell Pike
- Listing: Marilyn, Hewitt, Wainwright, Nuttall
- Coordinates: 54°23′18″N 3°12′15″W

Geography
- Location within the Lake District Location within the former Borough of Copeland
- Location: Cumbria, England
- Parent range: Lake District, Southern Fells
- OS grid: SD218997
- Topo map: OS Landranger 96, Explorer OL6

Harter Fell is a fell in the western part of the English Lake District, located between the Eskdale and Duddon valleys. Its height is 653 metres (2,142 ft) There are several walking routes to the summit.

== Topography ==
The headwaters of the Esk and Duddon are separated by a ridge falling south west from the summit of Crinkle Crags. This line of high ground continues over many twists and turns for 15 miles, finally meeting the sea on the slopes of Black Combe. From Crinkle Crags the first fells on this ridge are Hard Knott and Harter Fell, separated by Hardknott Pass. From Harter Fell the ridge continues over Green Crag, Great Worm Crag, Yoadcastle, Whitfell, Buck Barrow and Black Combe. Alfred Wainwright considered the latter hills unworthy of inclusion in his influential Pictorial Guide to the Lakeland Fells, stating that "south and west from Green Crag the scenery quickly deteriorates. This summit has therefore been taken as the boundary of fellwalking country." Later guidebook writers have disagreed, adding and the remainder of the range to their main volumes. Wainwright himself later relented and included these lesser hills in a supplementary volume, The Outlying Fells of Lakeland.

From the top of the pass a complex series of grassy knolls firms up into a ridge bearing south westward. This steps upward, first over Horsehow Crags and then the impressive gable-end of Demming Crag, before reaching the summit area. Further outcropping rock occurs on all sides, although little of it is of interest to climbers. Notable features are Maiden Castle, Brandy Crag and Mart Crag to the south east and Kepple Crag to the south. To the southwest is a broad and marshy saddle leading onto Green Crag and the moorlands of Birker Fell, the ongoing watershed. The southern and eastern flanks are heavily forested with conifers, legions of Forestry Commission trees sweeping down into the Duddon valley.

Harter Fell appears in most views as a conical hill, unsurprising given its broadly circular contours. Wainwright paid it perhaps the ultimate accolade, stating that "Not many fells can be described as beautiful, but the word fits Harter Fell, especially so when viewed from Eskdale.".

== Summit ==
The summit area bears three rocky tors, the middle one of which is the highest. An Ordnance Survey triangulation column stands on the western outcrop. From its summit each of the ring of fells known as the Eskdale Horseshoe can be clearly seen: Sca Fell, Scafell Pike, Broad Crag, Great End, Esk Pike, Bow Fell and Crinkle Crags. To the south are the sands of the Duddon estuary and Morecambe Bay, and to the west the Irish Sea and Isle of Man.

== Geology ==
Harter Fell offers excellent insights into the structure and composition of the Birker Fell formation of the Ordovician Borrowdale Volcanic Group. The fell is dominantly composed of composite andesite lava flows, with autobrecciated upper surfaces developed in some locations. These are often seen in the field as flat surfaces above steep crags, the crags themselves being formed due to the more crystalline, lower portions of each flow. The dip slope on these flows (~24° WSW) suggests that the formation is in nearly the same orientation now as when it formed. The summit of the fell is composed of one such lava flow, but only a few metres down slope the underlying lava flow is a portion of the Great Whinscale Dacite. This local marker unit conformably overlies an andesitic lapilli tuff and the Little Stand Tuff, a nodular rhyolitic ignimbrite. Below these distinctive rock units the andesite lava flows are seen again. On the northern side of the fell, at approximately 520 – 540 m elevation, a volcaniclastic sandstone unit is intercalated between the flows. Also on the northern slopes of the fell, and lower still at between 450 – 500 m, the lava flows switch to dacitic composition, with distinctive euhedral plagioclase feldspar phenocrysts (1 – 4 mm). The southern slopes of the fell again display the Great Whinscale dacite-tuff sequence, owing to extensive faulting. The very lowest slopes of the fell again revert to andesitic lava flows. In the north-western corner, near the Spothow Gill, a small vein of copper mineralisation has been worked out, and some of the evidence of this Victorian-era mining activity can still be seen.

== Ascents ==
From Eskdale Harter Fell can be climbed from Jubilee Bridge in the west or from the summit of Hardknott Pass in the east. From the Duddon, walkers can make use of the car parking at Birks Bridge. This provides a reasonably direct line from the west. An alternative is to start from Fickle Steps and circuit clockwise around the fell to join the path from Jubilee Bridge. Harter Fell forms the final challenge in the Woolpack walk when tackled in its usual direction.
