= Woodend, Cumbria =

Woodend, Cumbria may refer to:

- Woodend, Egremont, Cumbria
- Woodend, Ulpha, Cumbria
