= Water Crag =

Water Crag may refer to:

- A secondary summit of Rogan's Seat, a mountain in North Yorkshire, England
- A summit on the Circuit of Devoke Water, Cumbria, England, and one of The Outlying Fells of Lakeland
