= Woodend, Ulpha =

Hamlet in Cumbria, England

Coordinates: 54.355°N 3.281°W

Woodend
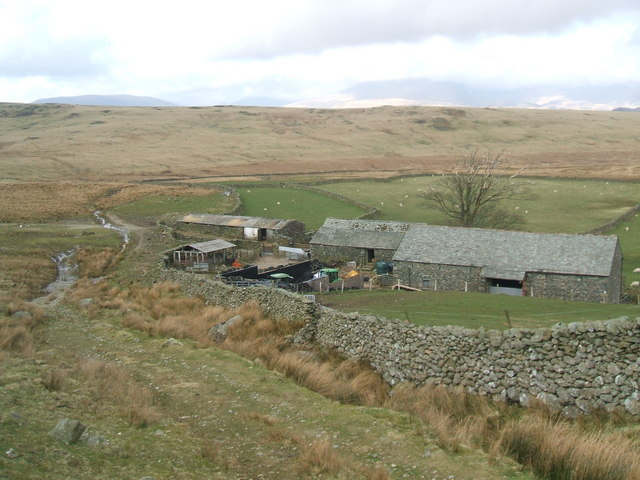
- Woodend farm buildings

- Location in Copeland Borough Location within Cumbria
- OS grid reference: SD1696
- Civil parish: Ulpha
- Unitary authority: Cumberland
- Ceremonial county: Cumbria
- Region: North West
- Country: England
- Sovereign state: United Kingdom
- Post town: BROUGHTON-IN-FURNESS
- Postcode district: LA20
- Dialling code: 019467
- Police: Cumbria
- Fire: Cumbria
- Ambulance: North West
- UK Parliament: Barrow and Furness

Woodend is a hamlet in the civil parish of Ulpha, in the Cumberland district, in the ceremonial county of Cumbria, England. It is situated between the Duddon Valley and the village of Ulpha and the valley of Eskdale, high up on Birker Fell, approximately 950 feet above sea level. It is claimed to have been an early Quaker settlement. With views towards Scafell Pike, England's highest mountain, it is very close to Devoke Water, one of the Lake District tarns.

A local historian recorded that "In the farmyard at Woodend can be seen a building used as a kind of barn, but with quite good mullion windows. This was the meeting house of the "Friends"."
