= Bill Birkett =

British climber and climbing writer

Thomas William Birkett (born 1952) better known as Bill Birkett is an English civil engineer, climbing writer, photographer, rock climber, and mountaineer, from the Lake District, Cumbria, who has undertaken many expeditions around the world. The 541 peaks of the lake district listed in one of his books are known as Birketts in his honor.

== Early life and education ==
Bill Birket was born on 13 May 1952 the son of pioneering Lake District climber Robert James 'Jim' Birkett.

He grew up in Langdale and started climbing as a child, lead his first extreme graded climbs at the age of 16.

Birkett studied civil engineering at Teesside Polytechnic, graduating in 1976. He then went on to work for Cumbria County Highways. He joined the Institution of Civil Engineers in 1981 and gained chartered status.

== Climbing ==
He has made the first ascents of a number of rock climbs including one of the first E7-graded climbs in Britain with Centrefold on Raven Crag Langdale in 1984.

Birkett is a member Member of the Climbers' Club, the British Mountaineering Council, the Austrian Alpine Club the Fell and Rock Climbing Club, the Outdoor Writers and Photographers Guild, British Guild of Travel Writers and the Society of Authors.

== Writing and photography ==
Birkett began writing and photographing for climbing magazines in the late 1970s, and in 1985 he became a freelance writer and photographer. Birkett's books have been published by a range of publishing companies including Cicerone Press, Oxford Illustrated Press, Constable, Harper Collins, AA, David & Charles and Frances Lincoln. In 2009 he set up his own publishing company, Bill Birkett Publishing to "have complete control" over future walks books.

== Awards and honours ==
Birkett has twice won Excellence awards from the Outdoor Writers and Photographers Guild for A Year in the Life of the Langdale Valleys in 2005, and A Year in the Life of the Duddon Valley in 2007.

A Year in the Life of the Duddon Valley also won the Dalesman Award for Best Outdoot book in 2007.

=== The Birketts ===
The 541 hills listed in Birkett's book the Complete Lakeland Fells (1994) have become known as Birketts (see Hill lists in the British Isles) and are a popular list used as a target by Hill Baggers.

== Publications ==
Birkett has written or co-authored over 30 books, including:

- Winter Climbs In The Lake District (with Bob Bennet and Andy Hyslop, 1980, 3rd edition 1997) ISBN 1852842466
- Lakelands Greatest Pioneers, 100 Years of Rock Climbing (1983) ISBN 0709005377
- Classic Rock Climbs In Great Britain (1986) ISBN 0946609306
- Classic Walks In Great Britain (1987) ISBN 1855092034
- Rock Climbs In The Lake District (with Geoff Cram, Chris Eilbeck and Ian Roper, 1987) ISBN 0094676402
- Modern Rock and Ice Climbing (1988) ISBN 0713656638
- The Hillwalker's Manual (1988) ISBN 0946609551
- Classic Rock Climbs In The Lake District (1989) ISBN 094660956X
- Women Climbing, 200 Years of Achievement (with Bill Peascod, 1990) ISBN 089886240X
- Rock Climbing In Northern England (with John White, 1990) ISBN 009468040X
- Classic Rock Climbs In Northern England (1990) ISBN 1855092085
- Classic Rock Climbs In Southern England (1991) ISBN 9781855092099
- French Rock (1993) ISBN 1852841133
- The Hillwalker's Manual, a Diffinative Source of Reference (1993) ISBN 1852843411
- Complete Lakeland Fells (1994) ISBN 0002184060
- Lakeland Fells Almanac (1997) ISBN 1897784597
- Great British Ridge Walks (1999) ISBN 0715307959
- Classic Treks: The 30 Most Spectacular Hikes in the World (2000) ISBN 082122655X
- Exploring The Lakes and Low Fells Vol. 1 (2001) ISBN 0715310771
- Exploring The Lakes and Low Fells Vol. 2 (2001) ISBN 071531078X
- 50 Walks In The Lake District (with contributions by Jon Sparks and Vivienne Crow, 2002) ISBN 9780749574833
- The English Lakes – Memories of Times Past (2006) ISBN 1903025443
- Scafell Portrait of a Mountain (2007) ISBN 0711227241
- A Year in the Life Series
  - A Year in the Life of the Lamgdale Valleys (2004) ISBN 0711224498
  - A Year in the Life of Borrowdale (2005) ISBN 0711225508
  - A Year in the Life of Glencoe (2005) ISBN 0711231648
  - A Year in the Life of the Duddon Valley (2006) ISBN 0711226377
  - A Year in the Life of the Isle of Skye (2008) ISBN 071122644X
  - A Year in the Life of Snowdonia (2009) ISBN 0711229910
  - A Year in the Life of Buttermere (2009) ISBN 0711229872
- Walk Series
  - Walk The Langdales (2009) ISBN 0956429602
  - Walk Ambleside, Rydal and Grasmere (2010) ISBN 0956429610
  - Walk Windermere & Hawkshed (2012) ISBN 0956429629
  - Walk Borrowdale & Keswick (2014) ISBN 0956429637
  - Walk Ullswater & Patterdale (2021) ISBN 0956429653

He is a regular contributor to The Great Outdoors, Climber, Climb, On the Edge, High and Cumbria magazines.

== Television ==
Birkett appeared on the Channel 4 series Yorkshire Dales and the Lake District (series 3, episode 1, 2019) climbing the North West Arete on Gimmer Crag in Langdale with his daughter Rowan Birkett.

== See also ==
- List of Birketts in the Lake District
