= Hesk Fell =

Fell in the Lake District, Cumbria, England

Coordinates: 54°20′30″N 3°16′10″W

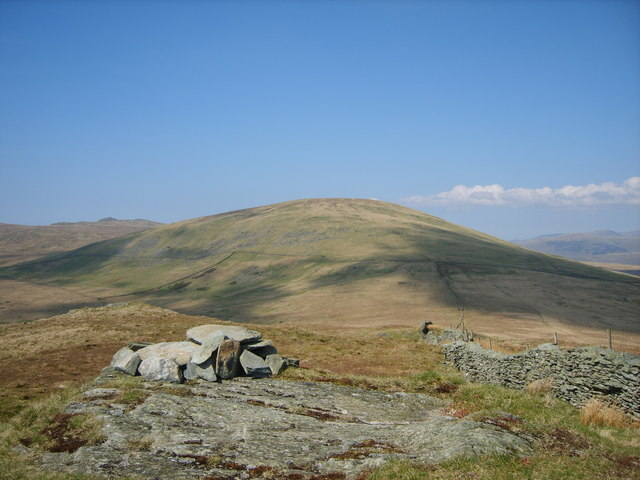
Hesk Fell from the cairn on The Pike

Hesk Fell is a hill in the south-west of the English Lake District, between the Duddon Valley and Eskdale near Ulpha, Cumbria. It is the subject of a chapter of Wainwright's book The Outlying Fells of Lakeland. It reaches 1,566 feet (477 m) and Wainwright's route, an anticlockwise circuit from the Birker Fell road, also visits The Pike at 1,214 feet (370 m). Wainwright admits that the fell "has many shortcomings" and that the view of Scafell Pike and its neighbours is "the only reward for the ascent".
