= Great Worm Crag =

Hill in English Lake District

Coordinates: 54°21′39″N 3°14′25″W

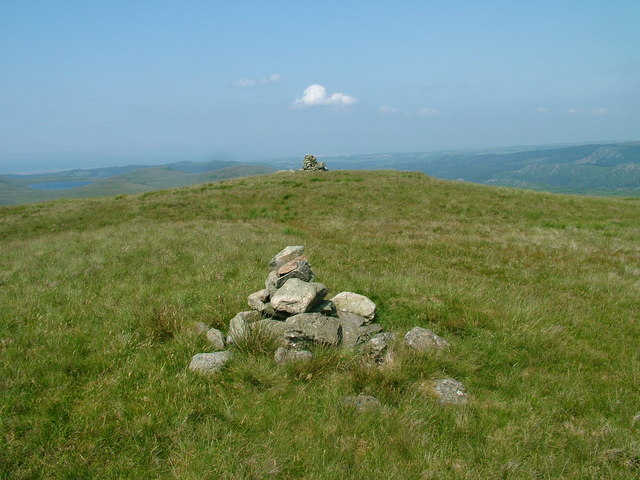
Cairns on Great Worm Crag

Great Worm Crag is a hill in south west of the English Lake District, north of Ulpha, Cumbria. It is the subject of a chapter of Wainwright's book The Outlying Fells of Lakeland. It reaches a height of 1,400 feet (430 m) and Wainwright's route is a clockwise circuit from the fell road between Ulpha and Eskdale Green. Mark Richards in his Fellrangers book series describes it as "A lovely place to roam ... blessed with spacious views" and offers two ascent routes from the south west and one, via Birkerthwaite, from the north west.
