= Birkerthwaite =

Village in Cumbria, England

Coordinates: 54.372°N 3.265°W

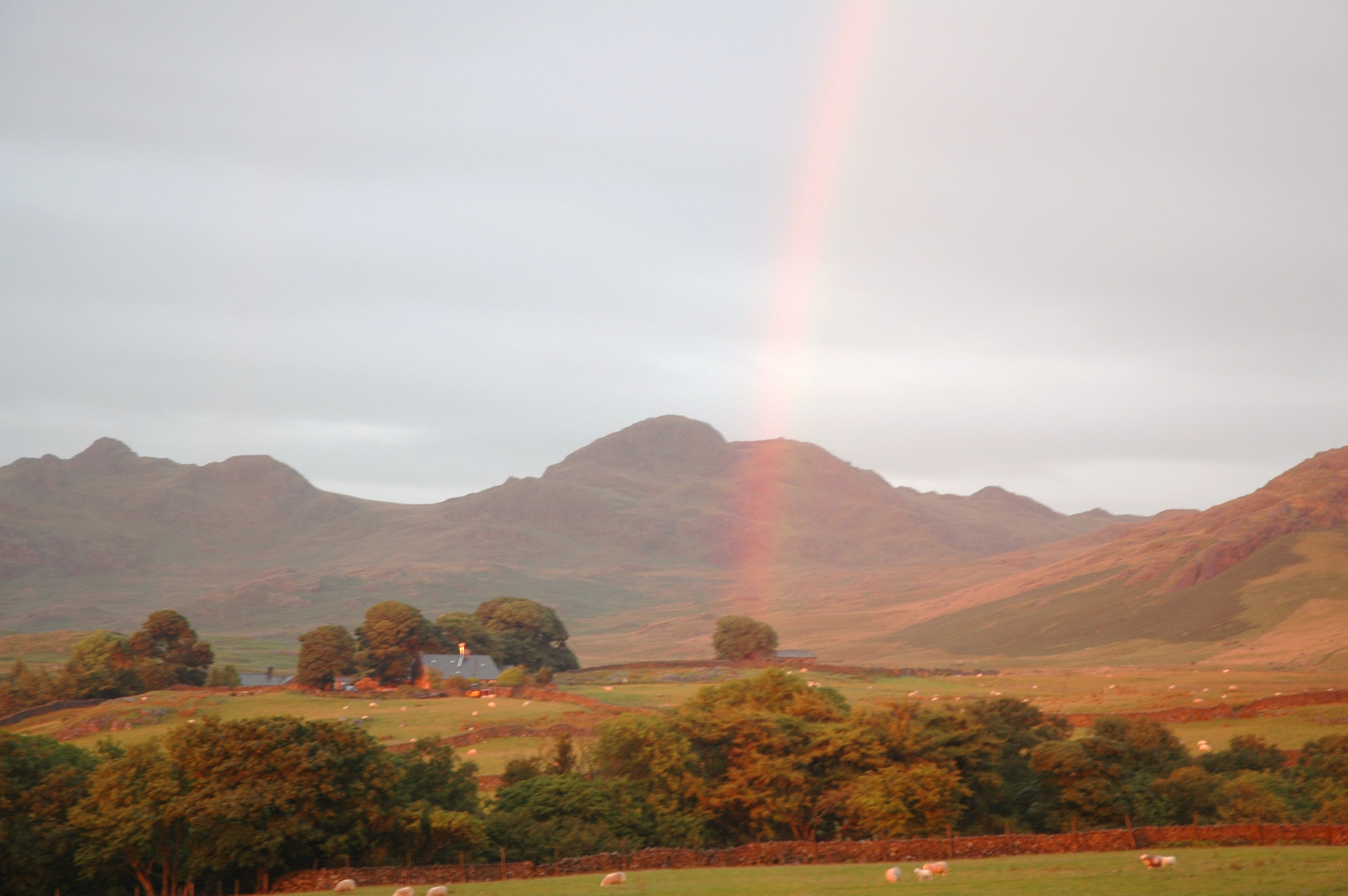
- Birkerthwaite, viewed from high ground with Green Crag in the background.

- Location in Copeland Borough Location within Cumbria
- OS grid reference: SD178981
- Civil parish: Eskdale
- Unitary authority: Cumberland
- Ceremonial county: Cumbria
- Region: North West
- Country: England
- Sovereign state: United Kingdom
- Post town: HOLMROOK
- Postcode district: CA19
- Dialling code: 01946
- Police: Cumbria
- Fire: Cumbria
- Ambulance: North West
- UK Parliament: Barrow and Furness

Birkerthwaite is a village on Birker Fell, Eskdale, Cumbria, England.

== See also ==
- List of places in Cumbria
