= Crinkle Crags =

Mountain in the English Lake District, Cumbria, England

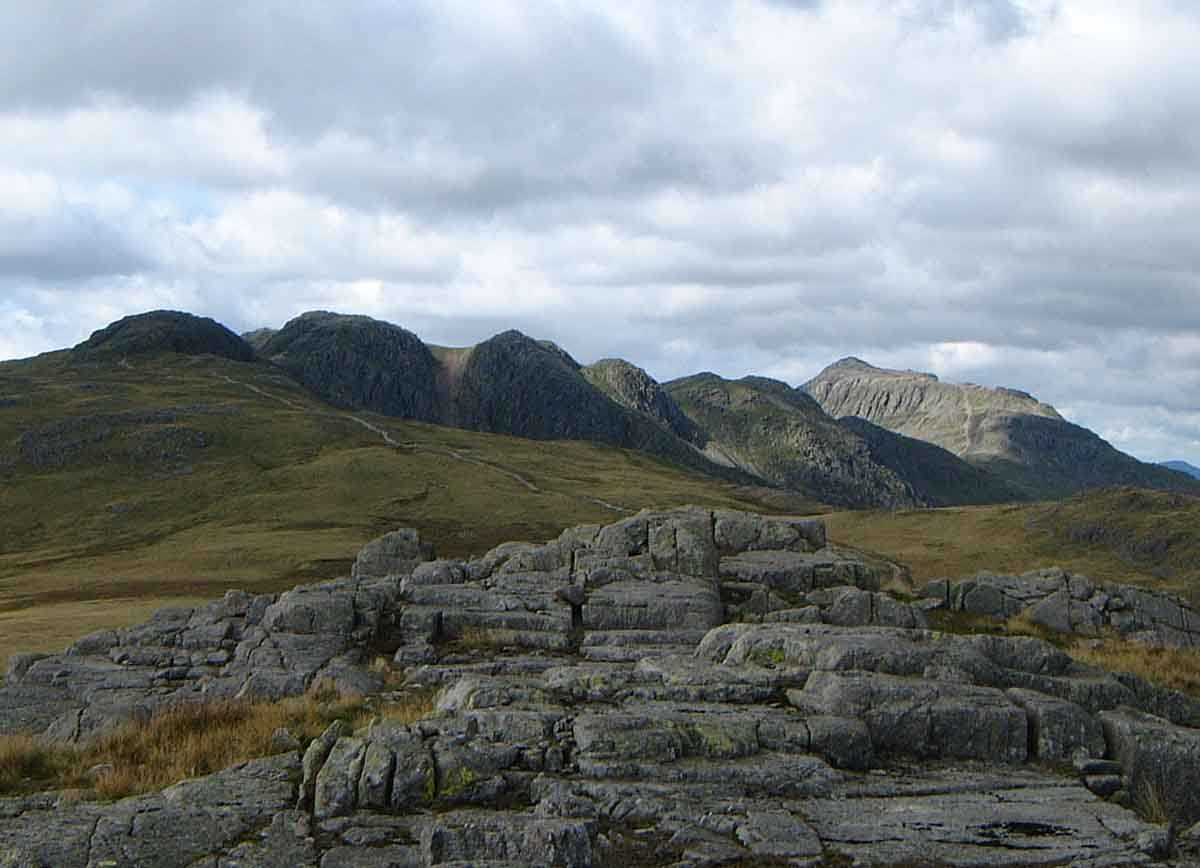
- Crinkle Crags from Cold Pike; on the far right in sunlight is Bowfell

Highest point
- Elevation: 859 m (2,818 ft)
- Prominence: c. 138 m (453 ft)
- Parent peak: Scafell Pike
- Listing: Hewitt, Nuttall, Wainwright
- Coordinates: 54°25′59″N 3°09′32″W

Geography
- Location within the Lake District Location within the former Borough of Copeland Location within the former South Lakeland district
- Location: Cumbria, England
- Parent range: Lake District, Southern Fells
- OS grid: NY248048
- Topo map: OS Landranger 89, 90, Explorer OL6

Listed summits of Crinkle Crags
Name	Grid ref	Height	Status
Crinkle Crags South Top	NY248048	834 m (2,736 ft)	Hewitt, Nuttall
Shelter Crags	NY249053	815 m (2,674 ft)	Hewitt, Nuttall
Shelter Crags North Top	NY249057	755 m (2,477 ft)	Nuttall
Little Stand	NY250034	740 m (2,430 ft)	Nuttall
Great Knott	NY260043	696 m (2,283 ft)	Nuttall

Crinkle Crags is a fell in the English Lake District in the county of Cumbria. It forms part of two major rings of mountains, surrounding the valleys of Great Langdale and Upper Eskdale. The name reflects the fell's physical appearance as its summit ridge is a series of five rises and depressions (crinkles) that are very distinctive from the valley floor. In Old English, cringol means twisted or wrinkled.

== Topography ==
The nomenclature of the various tops is very confused. Traditional guidebooks tend to rely on what the eye sees and therefore focus attention upon the five ‘crinkles’ of the summit ridge. These are generally referred to as the first to fifth crinkles, but Richards starts in the north, Birkett in the south and Wainwright employs both conventions, depending upon the direction of travel. For clarity in this article the first crinkle will be taken as the southernmost top. On this basis, the second Crinkle (also called Long Top) is the true summit of the fell. The only other Crinkle with a definitive name is Gunson Knott, but this name is used variously for the third and the fifth, with both the Ordnance Survey and the Database of British and Irish Hills listing it twice. To the north of the Crinkles proper is a depression and then the outcropping continues over Shelter Crags.

In recent times more systematic hill lists have been produced based upon topographical prominence and height, rather than mere visual appeal. Most relevant to Crinkle Crags are the lists of Hewitts and Nuttalls. These variously list the summit, the first Crinkle (Crinkle Crags South Top), and two tops on Shelter Crags (Shelter Crags and Shelter Crags North Top), but exclude the other three Crinkles, although the third (sometimes named Gunson Knott), fourth and fifth (also sometimes named Gunson Knott) are all Birketts.

The ridge of Crinkle Crags extends due south from its higher neighbour, Bowfell. Between the two is the col of Three Tarns, named for the small pools in the depression. Depending upon recent rainfall there may be anything from two to five tarns in evidence on the ground. From here the rocky outcropping of Shelter Crags is quickly reached.

Beyond the summit to the south, the ridge descends over Stonesty Pike (a Birkett) and Little Stand (a Nuttall and a Fellranger) to the Duddon Valley at Cockley Beck. Two further ridges branch out from Crinkle Crags on either side of the summit, before turning south to run parallel to Little Stand. On the west, across the marshy trench of Moasdale is Hard Knott. To the east an initially indistinct ridge firms up on the traverse to Cold Pike. Between Cold Pike and Crinkle Crags, but generally included as part of the latter is the further Nuttall of Great Knott.

== Ascents ==
In his Pictorial Guide to the Lakeland Fells, Alfred Wainwright describes Crinkle Crags as

Much too good to be missed ... this is a climb deserving of high priority.

There are a variety of routes directly to the summit: most people climb the fell from Great Langdale and usually together with all or some of the adjoining fells of Bowfell, Pike of Blisco, Rossett Pike and Cold Pike to make a high-level ridge walk which encompasses the whole of the high ground at the head of Great Langdale. The ascent from Eskdale is very good, but that is at least a 15 kilometres (9.3 miles) round trip (depending on where in Eskdale one starts), and many people will think that this too far to "bag" just one fell. The shortest and quickest route requires the use of a car to the top of the Wrynose Pass motor road.

== Summit ==
The traverse of the summit ridge with its series of undulations is an exhilarating experience for the fell walker. The ridge includes the so-called "Bad Step", a steep declivity which catches out many walkers when travelling from north to south; however, the obstacle can be by-passed without too much trouble.

The view from the summit is very good: there are airy views of Great Langdale, Eskdale and Dunnerdale, with the estuaries of the rivers Duddon and Esk well seen as they enter the Irish Sea. There is a very good view of England's highest mountain, Scafell Pike, which lies just four kilometres (2 1/2 miles) away to the north west. Shelter Crags gives extensive all-round views.

Panorama

== Protected Area ==
Crinkle Crags are within a Site of Special Scientific Interest (SSSI) called Ray and Crinkle Crags. This 146-hectare site was designated in 1988 because of the important geology present that reveals volcanic activity that occurred here in the late Ordovician period.

This protected area includes Crinkle Crags South Top and Gunson Knott.

=== Details of SSSI status ===
The volcanic rocks of the Borrowdale Volcanic Group at Crinkle Crags record the cyclic history of eruptions and caldera collapse that occurred within the Scafel Caldera. Rock types present include tuffs and ignimbrite. West of Crinkle Crags, basalt lava has been recorded. This site is exceptional because it shows the range of deposits formed by the explosive disintegration of magma by water (most calderas of this type are inaccessible because they are flooded or buried by their erupted products). The geology here has been interpreted as showing how volcanic eruptions led to faults changing and growing.

=== Land ownership in this SSSI ===
Crinkle Crags are aligned on the boundary between Eskdale and Westmorland and Furness. Part of the land within Ray and Crinkle Crags SSSI that is on the western Eskdale side is owned by the National Trust.

== See also ==
- List of hills in the Lake District

== Gallery ==
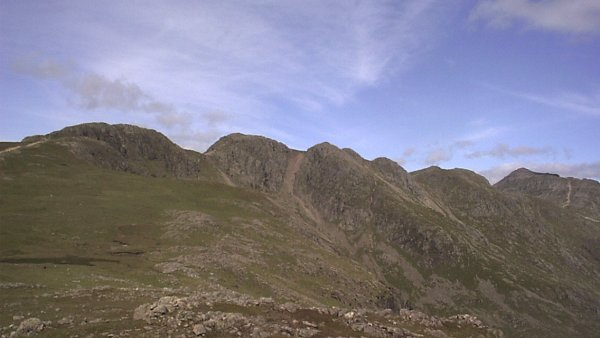
The five Crinkles as seen from Great Knott

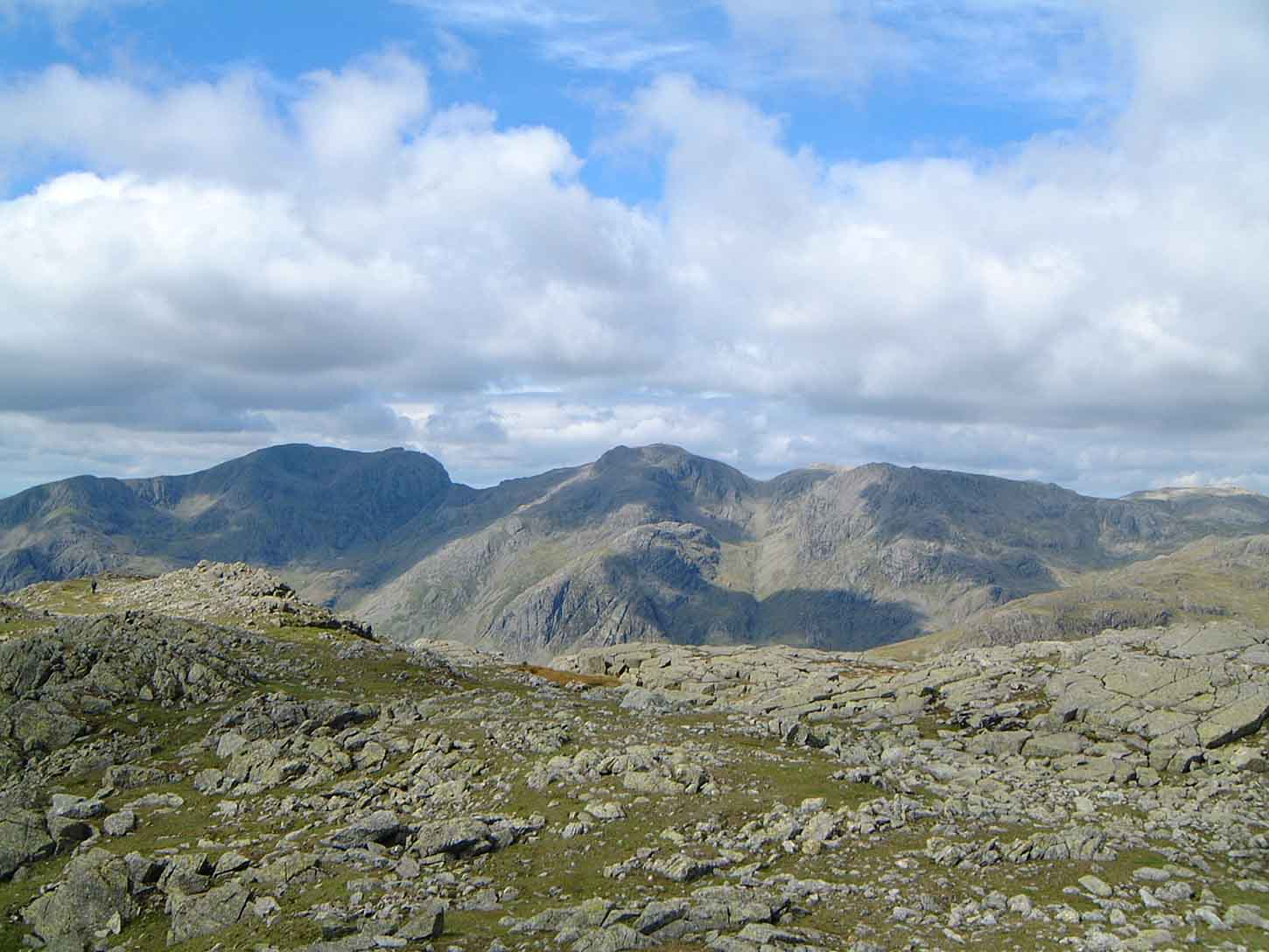
The Sca Fell massif from the summit of Crinkle Crags

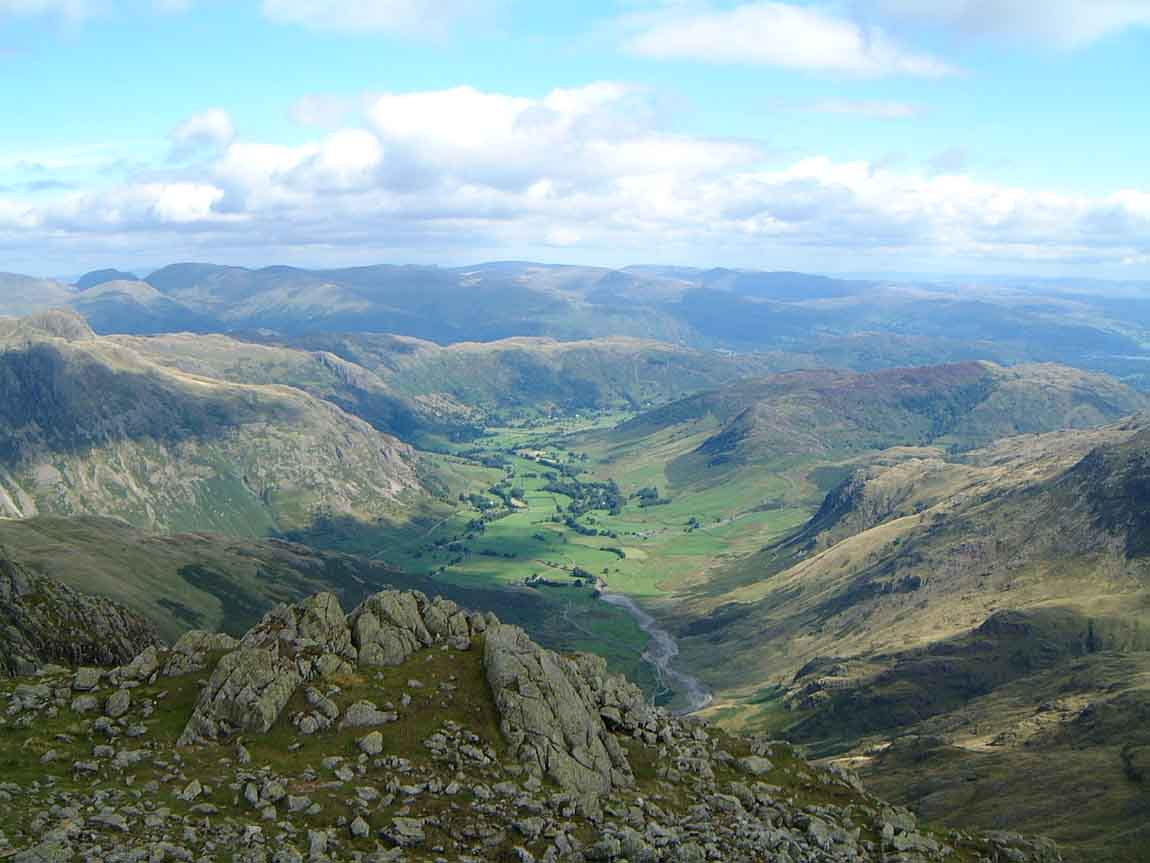
Great Langdale from the summit of Crinkle Crags

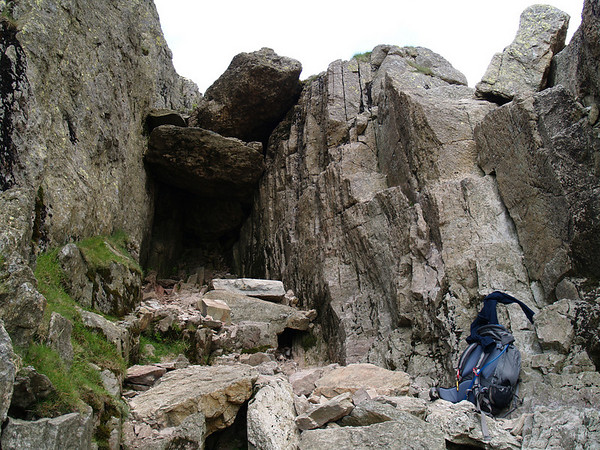
The famous 'Bad Step'

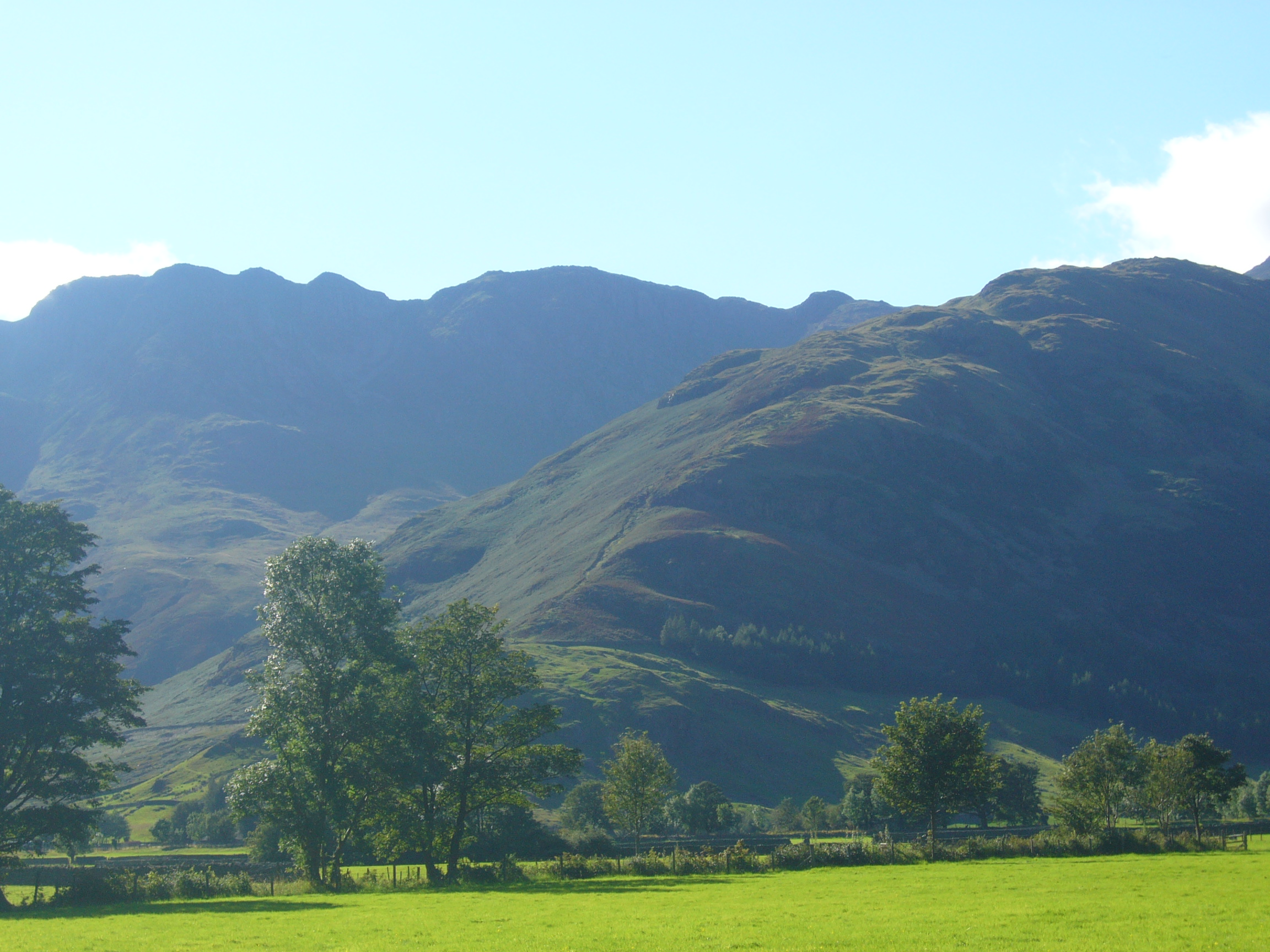
The Crinkles (left) looking up The Band
