= Whitfell =

Mountain in the English Lake District, Cumbria, England

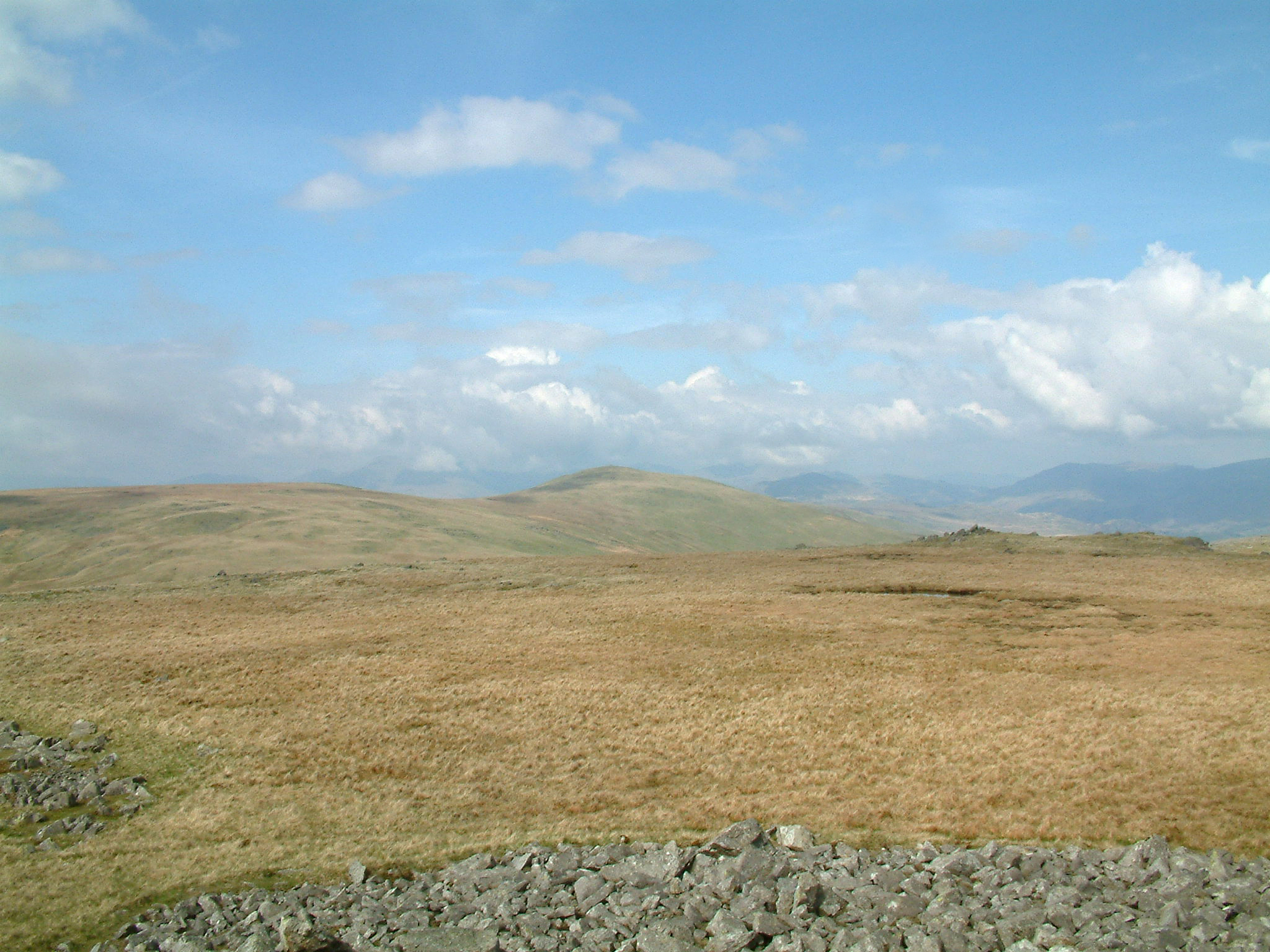
- From the summit of Kinmont Buck Barrow, looking to the flat summit of Burn Moor and Whitfell (centre), with the Duddon Valley right

Highest point
- Elevation: 573 m (1,880 ft)
- Prominence: c. 221 m
- Parent peak: Black Combe
- Listing: Marilyn, Outlying Wainwright
- Coordinates: 54°19′29″N 3°17′46″W

Geography
- Location within the Lake District
- Location: Lake District, England
- OS grid: SD158929
- Topo map: OS Landranger 96

Whitfell (or sometimes Whit Fell) is a hill of 573 metres (1,880 ft) in the southwestern part of the Lake District. It is the highest point between Black Combe and Harter Fell on the broad ridge to the west of the Duddon Valley. Views from the summit include the full length of the Duddon Valley including its estuary; the western side of the Coniston fells; the Eskdale fells including Scafell and Bowfell; much of western Cumbria including the estuary of the Rivers Esk, Mite and Irt; the Isle of Man; as well as the hills to the south culminating in Black Combe.

The hill is relatively infrequently visited, and is a fairly characterless grassy mound, extensively grazed by sheep, though with a very large cairn, whose stones may be from a tumulus. A bridleway crosses the fell to the north of the summit, but it is probably more frequently visited on a round including Burn Moor at 1,780 feet (540 m), Kinmont Buck Barrow at 1,754 feet (535 m), and Buck Barrow at 1,799 feet (548 m) from the summit of the Corney Fell road, a route described by Alfred Wainwright in the "Whit Fell" chapter of his book The Outlying Fells of Lakeland.
