= Devoke Water =

Lake in Cumbria, England

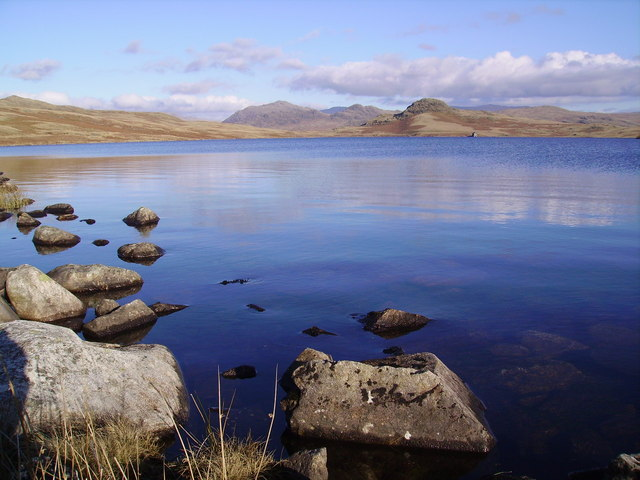

- Location in the Lake District Location in the former Copeland Borough
- Location: Lake District, Cumbria
- Coordinates: 54°21′33″N 3°18′10″W
- Primary outflows: Black Beck
- Basin countries: United Kingdom
- Max. length: .75 mi (1.21 km)
- Max. width: .27 mi (0.43 km)
- Max. depth: 46 ft (14 m)
- Surface elevation: 770 ft (230 m)

Devoke Water is a small lake in the south west of the Lake District in North West England. It is the largest tarn in the Lake District, a tarn being a specific type of glacial lake formed when a hollow is created on a mountain. The lake is 1.17 kilometres (0.73 mi) long, has an area of 0.34 square kilometres (0.13 sq mi) and lies at an altitude of 236 metres (774 ft) on Birker Fell. Its outflow, to the north west, is Linbeck Gill, which joins the River Esk before flowing into the Irish Sea at Ravenglass. The lake is in the unitary authority of Cumberland and the ceremonial county of Cumbria. Its south-western shore forms part of the south-western boundary of Eskdale parish, in which it is situated.

Devoke Water can be reached via a bridle track. There is a two-storey stone boathouse-cum-refuge and a ruined stable. The fishing rights to the lake are owned by Millom Anglers and it is stocked with brown trout. It also holds perch.

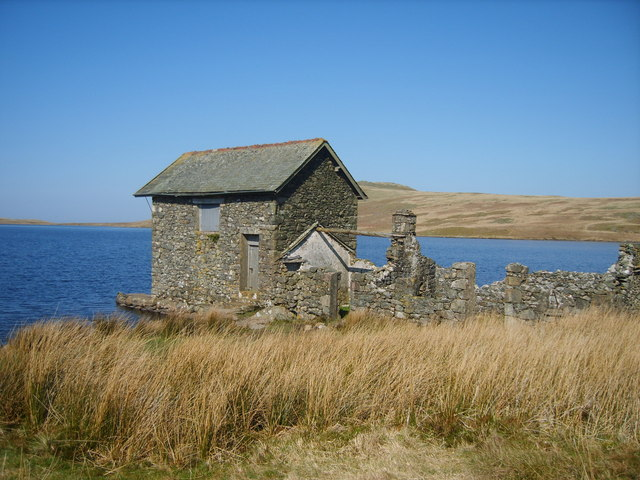
The boathouse

== The Circuit of Devoke Water ==
One of the chapters of Alfred Wainwright's The Outlying Fells of Lakeland is a circular walk anticlockwise around Devoke Water, starting and finishing on the road to the east. He describes the summits Rough Crag at 1,049 feet (320 m), Water Crag at 997 feet (304 m), White Pike at 1,370 feet (420 m), Yoadcastle at 1,610 feet (490 m), Woodend Height at 1,597 feet (487 m) and Seat How at 1,020 feet (310 m), and says that "it is predominantly for the mountain prospect that this walk gains a strong recommendation", noting that the view from the summits includes Pillar and nearby fells to the north, the Scafell group to the north north east and the Bowfell group to the north east, as well as the Isle of Man and Sellafield power station. He warns that "Linbeck Gill is uncrossable dryshod after rain".

All six summits are classified as Birketts. Yoadcastle is classed as a Fellranger, being described by Richards in the Coniston volume of his book series. It is among the 21 such summits (originally 18 before the extension of the Lake District) which are not included in Wainwright's main list of 214.
