= Birker Fell =

Upland area in Cumbria, England

Birker Fell, also known as Birker Moor, is an upland wilderness area in the western portion of the Lake District National Park, in Cumbria, England. Rather than being formed of one single high peak, the fell is a broad, undulating area, approximately 6 km square, with numerous crags and prominences scattered across its area. The highest point of the fell is at Green Crag (489m, grid reference SD200983). The fell is bordered by the Duddon Valley to the south-east, Ulpha Fell to the south-west, Harter Fell to the north-east, and Eskdale to the north-west.

One small hamlet, Birkerthwaite (grid reference SD179982), lies in a shallow valley near the centre of the fell, but other than this the only human habitations are scattered hill farms. A road crosses the fell between Eskdale Green and Ulpha, in the Duddon Valley.

== Landscape ==
Apart from Green Crag, other notable high points on the fell include: Crook Crag (469m, grid reference SD200987); White How (444m, SD204974); Great Worm Crag (427m, SD194969); Iron Crag (408m, SD211972); Kepple Crag (328m,SD198999); Great Crag (323m, SD187978); Rough Crag (319m, SD162977); Water Crag (305m, SD154975); and Brantrake Crags (259m, SD148982). Between these points are a plethora of smaller crags and knolls, separated by shallow valleys and bogs, giving the high fell an uneven and chaotic appearance.

Water plays an important role in defining the character of Birker Fell. Between the crags flow many small streams, known as becks or gills in the local terminology. Many of the becks rise in one of the numerous bogs which occur in the area, the largest of which are White Moss, Sike Moss, Tewitt Moss and Foxbield Moss. At the western edge of the fell lies Devoke Water, which claims the title of largest tarn in the Lake District. It lies at an altitude of 235 m (770 ft) and is approximately 1 km long (east-west) and 0.4 km wide. The southern border between Birker Fell and Ulpha Fell traces a line between Devoke Water and the valley of Crosby Gill, a large stream that drops down the southern flanks of the fell to the village of Ulpha in the Duddon Valley. The northern edge of the fell is marked by a steep range of crags which drop sharply to the floor of Eskdale. These crags are cut by the cascades of Stanley Force and Birker Force, two of the most spectacular waterfalls in the Lake District.

== Geology ==
Geologically, Birker Fell is of importance as the type locality of the Birker Fell Formation (BFF) of the Borrowdale Volcanic Group (BVG). The BFF forms the lowest, and hence oldest, portion of this famous sequence of andesite and dacite volcanic rocks. The Birker Fell Andesite occurs throughout much of the western Lake District. The BVG are thought to have formed in the early Ordovician by island arc volcanic activity, due to subduction during the closing of the Iapetus Ocean.

The central and northern areas of Birker Fell are dominated by composite andesite lava flows. Within the andesitic lava flows, the Great Whinscale Dacite lava flow and the associated, underlying Little Stand Tuff form a marker band that runs northeast–southwest across the fell, but are best seen at Silver How (grid reference SD195983) and Great Whinscale (SD197989). A small area of basaltic material occurs approximately 1 km north of Birkerthwaite, composed of plagioclase- and pyroxene-phyric andesite-basalt lavas (the Birkby Fell Member), and tuff and lapilli-tuffs (the Devoke Water Member). The main outcrop of the Devoke Water Member occurs to the south-west of Devoke Water itself, on Ulpha Fell. The south and south-eastern portion of the fell is composed of a sequence of tuff beds with highly variable composition: from rhyolitic through to basaltic. These overlie the BFF and form the next section of the BVG sequence.

In the north-western corner of Birker Fell, extensive faulting has juxtaposed the BVG rocks against granites of the late Ordovician Eskdale Intrusion.
