= Hard Knott =

Fell in the Lake District, Cumbria, England

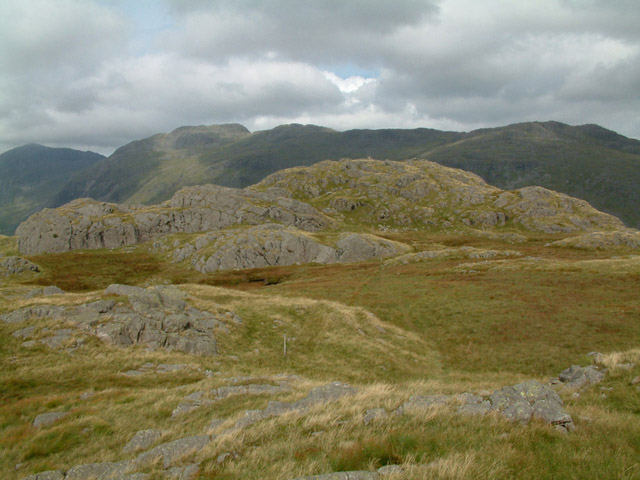
- Looking to the summit of Hard Knott, with Crinkle Crags and Bowfell behind.

Highest point
- Elevation: 549 m (1,801 ft)
- Prominence: 154 m (505 ft)
- Parent peak: Scafell Pike
- Listing: Marilyn, Wainwright
- Coordinates: 54°24′37″N 3°11′11″W

Geography
- Location within the Lake District Location within the former Borough of Copeland
- Location: Cumbria, England
- Parent range: Lake District, Southern Fells
- OS grid: NY231023
- Topo map: OS Landrangers 89, 90, Explorer OL6

Hard Knott is a fell in the English Lake District, at the head of Eskdale.

The northern and western slopes of Hard Knott are in the civil parish of Eskdale, while the southern and eastern slopes are in the civil parish of Ulpha. Both are in the unitary authority area of Cumberland and the ceremonial county of Cumbria.

== Geology ==
Rhyolitic lava-like tuff of the Bad Step Tuff forms the summit rocks with the dacitic lapilli-tuffs of the Lincomb Tarns Formation to the north west. Border end shows outcropping plagioclase-phyric andesite lavas of the Birker Fell Formation.

== Summit ==
Hard Knott reaches a height of 549 metres (1,801 ft), the summit knoll bearing a cairn. There are other named tops on the ridge in addition to the summit, with Yew Bank to the north and Border End to the south. Hard Knott is known for its views of the Scafell massif to the north, while Harter Fell dominates the vista to the south.

== Ascents ==
The fell is usually climbed from the top of the Hardknott Pass where there are several parking spaces. It is also possible to begin the ascent from the foot of the pass in Eskdale, although this will triple the length of the walk and the height gained. However, the best plan is probably to climb Hard Knott in conjunction with the neighbouring fell of Harter Fell making a horseshoe walk starting and finishing in Eskdale. From the top of the pass it is a short ascent to the fell summit following an electric fence that skirts to the right of the dangerous looking Raven Crag and takes the walker to the summit in a short time. Other possible routes include a pathless ascent from the Esk via The Steeple, a circuitous walk via the head of Moasdale and an ascent of the eastern flanks via Dod Pike.
