= List of fells in the Lake District =

This page lists the fells, hills, mountains, groups of mountains and subsidiary summits and tops in the Lake District, England, in several lists using different selection criteria and list formats.

== Alphabetical list ==
A
- Allen Crags
- Angletarn Pikes
- Ard Crags
- Armboth Fell
- Arnison Crag
- Arthur's Pike

B

- Bakestall
- Bannerdale Crags
- Barf
- Barrow
- Base Brown
- Beda Fell
- Binsey
- Birker Fell
- Birkhouse Moor
- Birks
- Black Combe
- Black Fell
- Blake Fell
- Blea Rigg
- Bleaberry Fell
- Blencathra
- Bonscale Pike
- Bowfell
- Bowscale Fell
- Brae Fell
- Brandreth
- Branstree
- Brim Fell
- Brock Crags
- Broom Fell
- Brown Pike
- Buckbarrow
- Buck Pike
- Burnbank Fell

C

- Calf Crag
- Carl Side
- Carrock Fell
- Castle Crag
- Catbells
- Catstye Cam
- Causey Pike
- Caw Fell
- Clough Head
- Cold Pike
- Crag Hill
- Crag Fell
- Crinkle Crags

D

- Dale Head
- Dent
- Dodd
- Dollywaggon Pike
- Dove Crag
- Dow Crag

E

- Eagle Crag
- Eel Crag (Crag Hill)
- Esk Pike

F

- Fairfield
- Fellbarrow
- Firbank Fell
- Flat Fell
- Fleetwith Pike
- Froswick

G

- Gavel Fell
- Gibson Knott
- Glaramara
- Glenridding Dodd
- Gowbarrow Fell
- Grange Fell
- Grasmoor
- Gray Crag
- Grayrigg Forest
- Graystones
- Great Borne
- Great Calva
- Great Carrs
- Great Cockup
- Great Crag
- Great Dodd
- Great End
- Great Gable
- Great Mell Fell
- Great Rigg
- Great Sca Fell
- Green Crag
- Green Gable
- Grey Crag
- Grey Friar
- Grey Knotts
- Grike
- Grisedale Pike
- Gummer's How

H

- Hallin Fell
- Hard Knott
- Harrison Stickle
- Hart Crag
- Hart Side
- Harter Fell, Eskdale
- Harter Fell, Mardale
- Hartsop above How
- Hartsop Dodd
- Haycock
- Haystacks
- Helm Crag
- Helvellyn
- Hen Comb
- Heron Pike
- High Crag
- High Hartsop Dodd
- High Pike (Scandale)
- High Pike (Caldbeck)
- High Raise, Langdale
- High Raise (High Street)
- High Rigg
- High Seat
- High Spy
- High Stile
- High Street
- High Tove
- Hindscarth
- Holme Fell
- Hopegill Head

I

- Ill Bell
- Illgill Head

K

- Kentmere Pike
- Kidsty Pike
- Kirk Fell
- Knott
- Knott Rigg
- The Knott

L

- Lank Rigg
- Latrigg
- Ling Fell
- Lingmell
- Lingmoor Fell
- Little Cockup
- Little Hart Crag
- Little Mell Fell
- Loadpot Hill
- Loft Crag
- Long Side
- Longlands Fell
- Lonscale Fell
- Lord's Seat
- Loughrigg Fell
- Low Fell
- Low Pike
- Lowthwaite Fell

M

- Maiden Moor
- Mardale Ill Bell
- Meal Fell
- Mellbreak
- Middle Dodd
- Middle Fell
- Muncaster Fell
- Mungrisdale Common

N

- Nab Scar
- The Nab
- Nethermost Pike

O

- Old Man of Coniston
- Outerside

P

- Pavey Ark
- Pike of Blisco
- Pike of Stickle
- Pillar
- Place Fell

R

- Raise
- Rampsgill Head
- Rannerdale Knotts
- Raven Crag
- Red Pike (Buttermere)
- Red Pike (Wasdale)
- Red Screes
- Rest Dodd
- Robinson
- Rossett Pike
- Rosthwaite Fell

S

- Sail
- St Sunday Crag
- Sale Fell
- Sallows
- Scafell
- Scafell Pike
- Scar Crags
- Scoat Fell
- Seat Sandal
- Seatallan
- Seathwaite Fell
- Selside Pike
- Sergeant Man
- Sergeant's Crag
- Sheffield Pike
- Shipman Knotts
- Silver How
- Skiddaw
- Skiddaw Little Man
- Slate Fell
- Slight Side
- Sour Howes
- Souther Fell
- Starling Dodd
- Steel Fell
- Steel Knotts
- Steeple
- Stone Arthur
- Stony Cove Pike
- Stybarrow Dodd
- Swirl How

T

- Tarn Crag (Easedale)
- Tarn Crag (Far Eastern Fells)
- Thornthwaite Crag
- Thunacar Knott
- Top o'Selside
- Troutbeck Tongue

U

- Ullock Pike
- Ullscarf

W

- Walla Crag
- Wandope
- Wansfell
- Watch Hill
- Watson's Dodd
- Wether Hill
- Wetherlam
- Whin Rigg
- Whinlatter
- White Side
- Whitfell
- Whiteless Pike
- Whiteside

Y

- Yoke
- Yewbarrow

== By height ==
=== Wainwrights ===
These are the 214 fells selected by Alfred Wainwright for a chapter in his seven Pictorial Guides to the Lakeland Fells. See List of Wainwrights for them sorted by book, and the other Lake District fells he listed in The Outlying Fells of Lakeland. Heights are from the most recent data in the Database of British Hills.

1. Scafell Pike, 978.07 m (3209 ft)
2. Scafell, 963.9 m (3162 ft)
3. Helvellyn, 949.8 m (3116 ft)
4. Skiddaw, 930.4 m (3052 ft)
5. Great End, 909.5 m (2984 ft)
6. Bowfell, 902.9 m (2962 ft)
7. Great Gable, 898.8 m (2949 ft)
8. Pillar, 892.4 m (2928 ft)
9. Nethermost Pike, 891.3 m (2924 ft)
10. Catstye Cam, 889.6 m (2919 ft)
11. Esk Pike, 885 m (2904 ft)
12. Raise, 882.7 m (2896 ft)
13. Fairfield, 873.3 m (2865 ft)
14. Blencathra, 867.8 m (2847 ft)
15. Skiddaw Little Man, 865 m (2838 ft)
16. White Side, 863.2 m (2832 ft)
17. Crinkle Crags, 859 m (2818 ft)
18. Dollywaggon Pike, 858.5 m (2817 ft)
19. Great Dodd, 857 m (2812 ft)
20. Grasmoor, 851.6 m (2794 ft)
21. Stybarrow Dodd, 843.7 m (2768 ft)
22. St Sunday Crag, 841.2 m (2760 ft)
23. Scoat Fell, 841 m (2759 ft)
24. Crag Hill, 839.2 m (2753 ft)
25. High Street, 828.5 m (2718 ft)
26. Red Pike (Wasdale), 826 m (2710 ft)
27. Hart Crag, 823.1 m (2700 ft)
28. Steeple, 819 m (2687 ft)
29. Lingmell, 807 m (2648 ft)
30. High Stile, 806.5 m (2646 ft)
31. High Raise (High Street), 803.6 m (2636 ft)
32. Old Man of Coniston, 802.4 m (2633 ft)
33. Swirl How, 802.4 m (2633 ft)
34. Kirk Fell, 802 m (2631 ft)
35. Green Gable, 799.9 m (2624 ft)
36. Haycock, 797 m (2615 ft)
37. Brim Fell, 795.9 m (2611 ft)
38. Rampsgill Head, 792.4 m (2600 ft)
39. Dove Crag, 792 m (2598 ft)
40. Grisedale Pike, 790.3 m (2593 ft)
41. Watson's Dodd, 789 m (2589 ft)
42. Allen Crags, 785 m (2575 ft)
43. Great Carrs, 785 m (2575 ft)
44. Thornthwaite Crag, 784 m (2572 ft)
45. Glaramara, 782.7 m (2568 ft)
46. Kidsty Pike, 781 m (2562 ft)
47. Harter Fell, Mardale, 779 m (2556 ft)
48. Red Screes, 778.8 m (2555 ft)
49. Dow Crag, 778 m (2552 ft)
50. Wandope, 773.9 m (2539 ft)
51. Grey Friar, 773 m (2536 ft)
52. Sail, 773 m (2536 ft)
53. Hopegill Head, 769.6 m (2525 ft)
54. Great Rigg, 766.4 m (2514 ft)
55. Stony Cove Pike, 763.7 m (2506 ft)
56. Wetherlam, 763 m (2503 ft)
57. High Raise, Langdale, 762.5 m (2502 ft)
58. Slight Side, 762 m (2500 ft)
59. Mardale Ill Bell, 761.2 m (2497 ft)
60. Ill Bell, 757 m (2484 ft)
61. Hart Side, 756 m (2480 ft)
62. Red Pike (Buttermere), 755.3 m (2478 ft)
63. Dale Head, 754 m (2474 ft)
64. Carl Side, 746.8 m (2450 ft)
65. High Crag, 744.8 m (2444 ft)
66. The Knott, 739 m (2425 ft)
67. Robinson, 737.6 m (2420 ft)
68. Seat Sandal, 736.8 m (2417 ft)
69. Sergeant Man, 736 m (2415 ft)
70. Harrison Stickle, 735.3 m (2412 ft)
71. Long Side, 734 m (2408 ft)
72. Kentmere Pike, 730.5 m (2397 ft)
73. Hindscarth, 727 m (2385 ft)
74. Clough Head, 726 m (2382 ft)
75. Thunacar Knott, 723 m (2372 ft)
76. Ullscarf, 723 m (2372 ft)
77. Froswick, 720 m (2362 ft)
78. Birkhouse Moor, 717.6 m (2354 ft)
79. Brandreth, 715 m (2346 ft)
80. Lonscale Fell, 715 m (2346 ft)
81. Branstree, 711.5 m (2334 ft)
82. Knott, 710.1 m (2330 ft)
83. Pike of Stickle, 708.4 m (2324 ft)
84. Whiteside (west top), 707 m (2320 ft)
85. Yoke, 707 m (2320 ft)
86. Pike of Blisco, 703 m (2306 ft)
87. Bowscale Fell, 702 m (2303 ft)
88. Pavey Ark, 701.6 m (2302 ft)
89. Cold Pike, 700.1 m (2297 ft)
90. Gray Crag, 698.1 m (2290 ft)
91. Caw Fell, 697 m (2287 ft)
92. Grey Knotts, 697 m (2287 ft)
93. Rest Dodd, 696 m (2283 ft)
94. Seatallan, 693 m (2274 ft)
95. Great Calva, 691 m (2267 ft)
96. Ullock Pike, 690.4 m (2265 ft)
97. Bannerdale Crags, 684.1 m (2244 ft)
98. Loft Crag, 681.7 m (2237 ft)
99. Sheffield Pike, 676.1 m (2218 ft)
100. Bakestall, 673.5 m (2210 ft)
101. Wether Hill (north top), 672.5 m (2206 ft)
102. Scar Crags, 672.2 m (2205 ft)
103. Loadpot Hill, 672 m (2205 ft)
104. Tarn Crag (Far Eastern Fells), 663.9 m (2178 ft)
105. Carrock Fell, 662.3 m (2173 ft)
106. Whiteless Pike, 660 m (2165 ft)
107. High Pike (Caldbeck), 658 m (2159 ft)
108. High Pike (Scandale), 657 m (2156 ft)
109. Place Fell, 657 m (2156 ft)
110. Selside Pike, 655 m (2149 ft)
111. Middle Dodd, 654 m (2146 ft)
112. Harter Fell (Eskdale), 653.2 m (2143 ft)
113. High Spy, 653.1 m (2143 ft)
114. Great Sca Fell, 651 m (2136 ft)
115. Rossett Pike, 651 m (2136 ft)
116. Fleetwith Pike, 648.9 m (2129 ft)
117. Base Brown, 646 m (2119 ft)
118. Grey Crag, 638 m (2093 ft)
119. Causey Pike, 637 m (2090 ft)
120. Little Hart Crag, 637 m (2090 ft)
121. Starling Dodd, 633 m (2077 ft)
122. Mungrisdale Common, 631.8 m (2073 ft)
123. Yewbarrow, 628.7 m (2063 ft)
124. Birks, 624 m (2047 ft)
125. Hartsop Dodd, 619 m (2031 ft)
126. Great Borne, 616 m (2021 ft)
127. Heron Pike (south top), 612 m (2008 ft)
128. High Seat, 609 m (1998 ft)
129. Illgill Head, 608.8 m (1997 ft)
130. Seathwaite Fell (north top), 601.1 m (1972 ft)
131. Haystacks, 597 m (1959 ft)
132. Bleaberry Fell, 590 m (1936 ft)
133. Shipman Knotts, 587 m (1926 ft)
134. Hartsop above How, 586.1 m (1923 ft)
135. Brae Fell, 585.4 m (1921 ft)
136. Middle Fell, 582 m (1909 ft)
137. Ard Crags, 581 m (1906 ft)
138. The Nab, 576 m (1890 ft)
139. Maiden Moor, 575 m (1886 ft)
140. Blake Fell, 572.6 m (1879 ft)
141. Sergeant's Crag, 571 m (1873 ft)
142. Outerside, 568 m (1864 ft)
143. Angletarn Pikes, 566 m (1857 ft)
144. Brock Crags (west top), 561.2 m (1841 ft)
145. Knott Rigg, 556 m (1824 ft)
146. Steel Fell, 553 m (1814 ft)
147. Lord's Seat, 552 m (1811 ft)
148. Rosthwaite Fell, 551 m (1808 ft)
149. Hard Knott, 549.6 m (1803 ft)
150. Meal Fell, 549.4 m (1802 ft)
151. Tarn Crag (Easedale), 549 m (1801 ft)
152. Blea Rigg, 541.5 m (1777 ft)
153. Lank Rigg, 541 m (1775 ft)
154. Calf Crag, 537 m (1762 ft)
155. Whin Rigg, 537 m (1762 ft)
156. Great Mell Fell, 536.6 m (1760 ft)
157. Arthur's Pike, 533 m (1749 ft)
158. Great Cockup, 526 m (1726 ft)
159. Gavel Fell, 524.3 m (1720 ft)
160. Bonscale Pike, 524 m (1719 ft)
161. Crag Fell, 523 m (1716 ft)
162. Eagle Crag, 522.8 m (1718 ft)
163. Souther Fell, 522 m (1713 ft)
164. High Hartsop Dodd, 519 m (1703 ft)
165. Whinlatter (west top), 517 m (1696 ft)
166. Sallows, 516 m (1693 ft)
167. High Tove, 515 m (1690 ft)
168. Mellbreak, 511.1 m (1677 ft)
169. Broom Fell, 510.2 m (1674 ft)
170. Beda Fell, 509 m (1670 ft)
171. Low Pike, 508 m (1667 ft)
172. Hen Comb, 506.2 m (1661 ft)
173. Little Mell Fell, 505.1 m (1657 ft)
174. Stone Arthur, 504 m (1654 ft)
175. Dodd, 502 m (1647 ft)
176. Green Crag, 488.7 m (1603 ft)
177. Grike, 488 m (1601 ft)
178. Wansfell, 486.9 m (1597 ft)
179. Longlands Fell, 483 m (1585 ft)
180. Sour Howes, 483 m (1585 ft)
181. Gowbarrow Fell, 481.2 m (1579 ft)
182. Armboth Fell (south top), 475 m (1558 ft)
183. Burnbank Fell, 475 m (1558 ft)
184. Lingmoor Fell, 469.9 m (1542 ft)
185. Barf, 469 m (1539 ft)
186. Raven Crag, 461 m (1512 ft)
187. Barrow, 455 m (1493 ft)
188. Catbells, 451 m (1480 ft)
189. Graystones (north top), 450.4 m (1478 ft)
190. Nab Scar, 450 m (1476 ft)
191. Great Crag, 449 m (1473 ft)
192. Binsey, 446.7 m (1466 ft)
193. Glenridding Dodd, 442 m (1450 ft)
194. Arnison Crag, 433 m (1421 ft)
195. Steel Knotts, 432 m (1417 ft)
196. Buckbarrow, 423 m (1388 ft)
197. Low Fell, 422.5 m (1386 ft)
198. Gibson Knott, 420.1 m (1378 ft)
199. Grange Fell (Brund Fell), 417.2 m (1369 ft)
200. Fellbarrow, 416 m (1365 ft)
201. Helm Crag, 405 m (1329 ft)
202. Silver How, 393.8 m (1292 ft)
203. Hallin Fell, 388 m (1273 ft)
204. Walla Crag, 379 m (1243 ft)
205. Ling Fell, 374 m (1227 ft)
206. Latrigg, 369 m (1211 ft)
207. Troutbeck Tongue, 364 m (1194 ft)
208. Sale Fell, 359 m (1178 ft)
209. High Rigg, 355.7 m (1167 ft)
210. Rannerdale Knotts, 355 m (1165 ft)
211. Loughrigg Fell, 335.1 m (1099 ft)
212. Black Fell, 323 m (1060 ft)
213. Holme Fell, 315.7 m (1036 ft)
214. Castle Crag, 290 m (951 ft)

=== Marilyns ===
A Marilyn is a hill which has a relative height of at least 150 metres (approximately 500 feet), regardless of its absolute height above sea level. List of Marilyns in England gives a more detailed listing, including the relative height for each fell.

1. Scafell Pike, 978 m (3209 ft)
2. Helvellyn, 950 m (3117 ft)
3. Skiddaw, 931 m (3054 ft)
4. Great Gable, 899 m (2949 ft)
5. Pillar, 892 m (2927 ft)
6. Fairfield, 873 m (2864 ft)
7. Blencathra, 868 m (2848 ft)
8. Grasmoor, 852 m (2795 ft)
9. St Sunday Crag, 841 m (2759 ft)
10. High Street, 828 m (2717 ft)
11. High Stile, 807 m (2648 ft)
12. Old Man of Coniston, 803 m (2635 ft)
13. Kirk Fell, 802 m (2631 ft)
14. Grisedale Pike, 791 m (2595 ft)
15. Red Screes, 776 m (2546 ft)
16. Stony Cove Pike, 763 m (2503 ft)
17. High Raise, Langdale, 762 m (2500 ft)
18. Dale Head, 753 m (2470 ft)
19. Robinson, 737 m (2418 ft)
20. Seat Sandal, 736 m (2415 ft)
21. Knott, 710 m (2329 ft)
22. Pike of Blisco, 705 m (2313 ft)
23. Seatallan, 692 m (2270 ft)
24. Tarn Crag (Far Eastern Fells), 664 m (2178 ft)
25. Place Fell, 657 m (2156 ft)
26. Harter Fell, Eskdale, 654 m (2146 ft)
27. Illgill Head, 609 m (1998 ft)
28. Black Combe, 600 m (1969 ft)
29. Whitfell, 573 m (1880 ft)
30. Blake Fell, 573 m (1880 ft)
31. Lord's Seat, 552 m (1811 ft)
32. Hard Knott, 549 m (1801 ft)
33. Great Mell Fell, 537 m (1762 ft)
34. Mellbreak, 512 m (1680 ft)
35. Little Mell Fell, 505 m (1657 ft)
36. Baystones, 488 m (1601 ft)
37. Lingmoor Fell, 469 m (1539 ft)
38. Binsey, 447 m (1467 ft)
39. Low Fell, 423 m (1388 ft)
40. Hallin Fell, 388 m (1273 ft)
41. High Rigg, 357 m (1171 ft)
42. Dent, 352 m (1155 ft)
43. Loughrigg Fell, 335 m (1099 ft)
44. Top o'Selside, 335 m (1099 ft)
45. Kirkby Moor, 334 m (1096 ft)
46. Gummer's How, 321 m (1053 ft)
47. Holme Fell, 317 m (1040 ft)
48. Claife Heights, 270 m (886 ft)
49. Watch Hill, 254 m (833 ft)
50. Swinside, 244 m (801 ft)
51. Muncaster Fell - Hooker Crag, 231 m (758 ft)
52. Whitbarrow, 215 m (705 ft)

=== Hewitts ===
The Hewitts are hills which have a relative height of at least 30 metres (approximately 100 feet), and are over 2000 feet (approximately 610 metres) above sea level.

1. Scafell Pike, 978 m (3209 ft)
2. Scafell, 964 m (3163 ft)
3. Helvellyn, 950 m (3117 ft)
4. Ill Crag, 935 m (3068 ft)
5. Broad Crag, 934 m (3064 ft)
6. Skiddaw, 931 m (3054 ft)
7. Great End, 910 m (2986 ft)
8. Bowfell, 902 m (2959 ft)
9. Great Gable, 899 m (2949 ft)
10. Pillar, 892 m (2927 ft)
11. Catstye Cam, 890 m (2920 ft)
12. Esk Pike, 885 m (2904 ft)
13. Raise, 883 m (2897 ft)
14. Fairfield, 873 m (2864 ft)
15. Blencathra, 868 m (2848 ft)
16. Skiddaw Little Man, 865 m (2838 ft)
17. White Side, 863 m (2831 ft)
18. Crinkle Crags, 859 m (2818 ft)
19. Dollywaggon Pike, 858 m (2815 ft)
20. Great Dodd, 857 m (2812 ft)
21. Grasmoor, 852 m (2795 ft)
22. Stybarrow Dodd, 843 m (2766 ft)
23. Scoat Fell, 841 m (2759 ft)
24. St Sunday Crag, 841 m (2759 ft)
25. Crag Hill, 839 m (2753 ft)
26. Crinkle Crags South Top, 834 m (2736 ft)
27. Black Crag, 828 m (2717 ft)
28. High Street, 828 m (2717 ft)
29. Red Pike (Wasdale), 826 m (2710 ft)
30. Hart Crag, 822 m (2697 ft)
31. Shelter Crags, 815 m (2674 ft)
32. Lingmell, 807 m (2648 ft)
33. High Stile, 807 m (2648 ft)
34. Old Man of Coniston, 803 m (2635 ft)
35. Kirk Fell, 802 m (2631 ft)
36. High Raise (High Street), 802 m (2631 ft)
37. Swirl How, 802 m (2631 ft)
38. Green Gable, 801 m (2628 ft)
39. Haycock, 797 m (2615 ft)
40. Green Side, 795 m (2608 ft)
41. Dove Crag, 792 m (2598 ft)
42. Rampsgill Head, 792 m (2598 ft)
43. Grisedale Pike, 791 m (2595 ft)
44. Kirk Fell East Top, 787 m (2582 ft)
45. Allen Crags, 785 m (2575 ft)
46. Thornthwaite Crag, 784 m (2572 ft)
47. Glaramara, 783 m (2569 ft)
48. Harter Fell, Mardale, 778 m (2552 ft)
49. Dow Crag, 778 m (2552 ft)
50. Red Screes, 776 m (2546 ft)
51. Sail, 773 m (2536 ft)
52. Grey Friar, 773 m (2536 ft)
53. Wandope, 772 m (2533 ft)
54. Hopegill Head, 770 m (2526 ft)
55. Great Rigg, 766 m (2513 ft)
56. Stony Cove Pike, 763 m (2503 ft)
57. Wetherlam, 763 m (2503 ft)
58. High Raise, Langdale, 762 m (2500 ft)
59. Ill Bell, 757 m (2484 ft)
60. Red Pike (Buttermere), 755 m (2477 ft)
61. Dale Head, 753 m (2470 ft)
62. Carl Side, 746 m (2448 ft)
63. Black Sails, 745 m (2444 ft)
64. High Crag, 744 m (2441 ft)
65. Hobcarton Crag, 739 m (2425 ft)
66. Robinson, 737 m (2418 ft)
67. Harrison Stickle, 736 m (2415 ft)
68. Seat Sandal, 736 m (2415 ft)
69. Long Side, 734 m (2408 ft)
70. Kentmere Pike, 730 m (2395 ft)
71. Hindscarth, 727 m (2385 ft)
72. Ullscarf, 726 m (2382 ft)
73. Clough Head, 726 m (2382 ft)
74. Red Beck Top, 721 m (2365 ft)
75. Froswick, 720 m (2362 ft)
76. Whiteside East Top, 719 m (2359 ft)
77. Lonscale Fell, 715 m (2346 ft)
78. Brandreth, 715 m (2346 ft)
79. Branstree, 713 m (2339 ft)
80. Knott, 710 m (2329 ft)
81. Pike of Stickle, 709 m (2326 ft)
82. Yoke, 706 m (2316 ft)
83. Pike of Blisco, 705 m (2313 ft)
84. Bowscale Fell, 702 m (2303 ft)
85. Cold Pike, 701 m (2300 ft)
86. Rest Dodd, 696 m (2283 ft)
87. Seatallan, 692 m (2270 ft)
88. Great Calva, 690 m (2264 ft)
89. Bannerdale Crags, 683 m (2241 ft)
90. Sheffield Pike, 675 m (2215 ft)
91. Scar Crags, 672 m (2205 ft)
92. Loadpot Hill, 671 m (2201 ft)
93. Tarn Crag (Far Eastern Fells), 664 m (2178 ft)
94. Carrock Fell, 663 m (2175 ft)
95. Whiteless Pike, 660 m (2165 ft)
96. High Pike (Caldbeck), 658 m (2159 ft)
97. Place Fell, 657 m (2156 ft)
98. Selside Pike, 655 m (2149 ft)
99. Harter Fell, Eskdale, 654 m (2146 ft)
100. High Spy, 653 m (2142 ft)
101. Rossett Pike, 651 m (2136 ft)
102. Fleetwith Pike, 648 m (2126 ft)
103. Base Brown, 646 m (2119 ft)
104. Iron Crag, 640 m (2100 ft)
105. Grey Crag, 638 m (2093 ft)
106. Causey Pike, 637 m (2090 ft)
107. Little Hart Crag, 637 m (2090 ft)
108. Starling Dodd, 633 m (2077 ft)
109. Dovenest Top, 632 m (2073 ft)
110. Seathwaite Fell, 632 m (2073 ft)
111. Rough Crag, 628 m (2060 ft)
112. Yewbarrow, 627 m (2057 ft)
113. Great Borne, 616 m (2021 ft)
114. Yewbarrow North Top, 616 m (2021 ft)

=== Sorted by height, within the National Park ===
Hills with more than 30 m (98 ft) relative height within the National Park are listed below in height order.

1. Scafell Pike (978.1m/3209ft)
2. Scafell (963.9m/3162ft)
3. Helvellyn (949.8m)
4. Broad Crag (935.3m/3069ft)
5. Ill Crag (930.9m/3054ft)
6. Skiddaw (930.4m/3052ft)
7. Great End (909.5m/2984ft)
8. Bowfell (902.9m)
9. Great Gable (898.8m/2949ft)
10. Pillar (892.4m/2928ft)
11. Catstycam (889.6m)
12. Esk Pike (885m)
13. Raise (882.7m)
14. Fairfield (873.3m)
15. Blencathra (867.8m)
16. Skiddaw Little Man (865m/2838ft)
17. White Side (863.2m)
18. Striding Edge (862.9m)
19. Crinkle Crags (859m)
20. Dollywaggon Pike (858.5m)
21. Great Dodd (857m)
22. Grasmoor (851.6m)
23. Stybarrow Dodd (843.7m)
24. St Sunday Crag (841.2m)
25. Scoat Fell (841m/2759ft)
26. Crag Hill (839.2m)
27. Crinkle Crags South Top (834m)
28. High Street (828.5m)
29. Black Crag (828m/2717ft)
30. Red Pike (Wasdale) (826m/2710ft)
31. Hart Crag (823.1m)
32. Shelter Crags (815m)
33. Lingmell (807m/2648ft)
34. High Stile (806.5m/2646ft)
35. High Raise (High Street) (803.6m)
36. Swirl How (802.4m)
37. The Old Man of Coniston (802.4m)
38. Kirk Fell (802m/2631ft)
39. Green Gable (799.9m/2624ft)
40. Haycock (797m/2615ft)
41. Rampsgill Head (792.4m)
42. Dove Crag (792m)
43. Grisedale Pike (790.3m/2593ft)
44. Kirk Fell East Top (787m/2582ft)
45. Allen Crags (785m/2575ft)
46. Thornthwaite Crag (784m)
47. Glaramara (782.7m/2568ft)
48. Harter Fell (Mardale) (779m)
49. Red Screes (778.8m)
50. Dow Crag (778m)
51. Wandope (773.9m/2539ft)
52. Grey Friar (773m/2536ft)
53. Sail (773m/2536ft)
54. Hopegill Head (769.6m/2525ft)
55. Great Rigg (766.4m)
56. Stony Cove Pike (763.7m)
57. Wetherlam (763m)
58. High Raise (Langdale) (762.5m)
59. Ill Bell (757m)
60. Red Pike (Buttermere) (755.3m/2478ft)
61. Dale Head (754m/2474ft)
62. Black Sails (745m)
63. High Crag (744.8m/2444ft)
64. Hobcarton Crag (737.6m/2420ft)
65. Robinson (737.6m/2420ft)
66. Seat Sandal (736.8m)
67. Combe Head (735.3m/2412ft)
68. Harrison Stickle (735.3m/2412ft)
69. Long Side (734m/2408ft)
70. Kentmere Pike (730.5m)
71. Hindscarth (727m/2385ft)
72. Clough Head (726m)
73. Ullscarf (723m/2372ft)
74. Froswick (720m)
75. Red Beck Top (719.5m/2361ft)
76. Whiteside (719.4m)
77. Brandreth (715m/2346ft)
78. Lonscale Fell (715m/2346ft)
79. Branstree (711.5m)
80. Knott (710.1m)
81. Pike of Stickle (708.4m)
82. Yoke (707m)
83. Pike of Blisco (703m)
84. Bowscale Fell (702m)
85. Cold Pike (700.1m)
86. Rest Dodd (696m)
87. Seatallan (693m/2274ft)
88. Great Calva (691m)
89. Bannerdale Crags (684.1m)
90. Sheffield Pike (676.1m)
91. Scar Crags (672.2m/2205ft)
92. Loadpot Hill (672m)
93. Tarn Crag (663.9m)
94. Carrock Fell (662.3m)
95. Whiteless Pike (660m/2165ft)
96. High Pike (658m)
97. Place Fell (657m)
98. Selside Pike (655m)
99. Harter Fell (Eskdale) (653.2m)
100. High Spy (653.1m/2143ft)
101. Rossett Pike (651m)
102. Fleetwith Pike (648.9m/2129ft)
103. Base Brown (646m/2119ft)
104. Iron Crag (640m/2100ft)
105. Grey Crag (638m)
106. Causey Pike (637m/2090ft)
107. Little Hart Crag (637m/2090ft)
108. Dovenest Top (633.3m/2078ft)
109. Starling Dodd (633m/2077ft)
110. Seathwaite Fell (631m/2070ft)
111. Yewbarrow (Wasdale) (628.7m)
112. Rough Crag (Mardale) (628m)
113. Yewbarrow North Top (616.6m/2023ft)
114. Great Borne (616m/2021ft)
115. High Seat (609m/1998ft)
116. Illgill Head (608.8m/1997ft)
117. Black Combe (600.2m)
118. Haystacks (597m/1959ft)
119. St Raven's Edge (593m)
120. Bleaberry Fell (590m/1936ft)
121. Black Crags (588m)
122. Middle Fell (582m/1909ft)
123. Ard Crags (581m/1906ft)
124. The Nab (576m)
125. Whitfell (573.3m)
126. Blake Fell (572.6m/1879ft)
127. Sergeant's Crag (571m)
128. Outerside (568m/1864ft)
129. Angletarn Pikes (566m)
130. Seat (561m/1841ft)
131. Bell Crags (559.1m/1834ft)
132. Knott Rigg (556m/1824ft)
133. Steel Fell (553m)
134. Lord's Seat (Thornthwaite) (552m/1811ft)
135. Rosthwaite Fell (551m/1808ft)
136. Hard Knott (549.6m)
137. Buck Barrow (549m)
138. Carling Knott (544m/1785ft)
139. Lank Rigg (541m/1775ft)
140. Calf Crag (537m)
141. Whin Rigg (537m/1762ft)
142. Great Mell Fell (536.6m)
143. High Wether Howe (531m)
144. White Howe (530m)
145. Caw (529m)
146. Green Crag (Buttermere) (528m/1732ft)
147. The Forest (528m/1732ft)
148. Great Cockup (526m)
149. High Snockrigg (526m)
150. Ullister Hill (525m/1722ft)
151. Whinlatter (525m/1722ft)
152. Gavel Fell (524.3m/1720ft)
153. Lord's Seat (Crookdale) (524m)
154. Crag Fell (523m/1716ft)
155. Great How (Eskdale) (522m/1713ft)
156. Souther Fell (522m/1713ft)
157. Sallows (516m)
158. Seat Robert (515m)
159. Mellbreak (511.1m/1677ft)
160. Beda Fell (509m/1670ft)
161. Lowthwaite Fell (509m/1670ft)
162. Mellbreak North Top (509m/1670ft)
163. Hen Comb (506.2m/1661ft)
164. Little Mell Fell (505.1m)
165. Dodd (Skiddaw) (502m/1647ft)
166. High Dodd (501m)
167. Yew Bank (499m)
168. High House Bank (495m)
169. Yoadcastle (494m)
170. Grayrigg Forest (493.9m)
171. Long Crag (Bannisdale) (493m)
172. Robin Hood (492m)
173. Whatshaw Common (490m)
174. Bampton Fell (489m)
175. Green Crag (Eskdale) (488.7m)
176. Grike (488m/1601ft)
177. Wansfell (486.9m)
178. Pipers Hill (485m)
179. Wansfell Pike (484.3m)
180. Longlands Fell (483m)
181. Sour Howes (483m)
182. Mabbin Crag (481.8m)
183. Gowbarrow Fell (481.2m)
184. Hesk Fell (478.1m)
185. Castle Fell (478m)
186. Whinfell Beacon (472m)
187. Ashstead Fell (471m)
188. Whinash (471m)
189. Lingmoor Fell (469.9m)
190. Barf (469m/1539ft)
191. Crook Crag (469m/1539ft)
192. Pikes (469m/1539ft)
193. Raven Crag (Thirlmere) (461m)
194. Graystones (455.3m/1494ft)
195. Barrow (Braithwaite) (455m/1493ft)
196. Cockley Moor (455m/1493ft)
197. Banna Fell (454.8m/1492ft)
198. Dodd (Lorton) (454m)
199. Long Fell (452m)
200. Catbells (451m)
201. Great Crag (449m/1473ft)
202. Stile End (447m/1467ft)
203. Binsey (446.7m)
204. Knock Murton (446.4m/1465ft)
205. The Benn (445.5m)
206. White How (443.9m)
207. Glenridding Dodd (442m)
208. Great Meldrum (437m)
209. Arnison Crag (433m)
210. Steel Knotts (432m)
211. Sleddale Forest (429m)
212. Great Worm Crag (427m)
213. Hollow Moor (426m)
214. Watermillock Fell (424m)
215. Low Fell (422.5m)
216. Ether Knott (420.1m/1378ft)
217. Brund Fell (417.2m/1369ft)
218. Fellbarrow (416m)
219. Oakhowe Crag (415.7m)
220. Lag Bank (411.2m)
221. Sourfoot Fell (411m)
222. Great Intake (408m)
223. Helm Crag (405m)
224. Throstlehow Crag (404m)
225. Knotts (Borrowdale) (401.7m/1318ft)
226. Silverybield Crag (395.2m)
227. Potter Fell (395m)
228. Darling Fell (392m/1286ft)
229. King's How (392m/1286ft)
230. Potter Fell NE Top (390m)
231. Blakeley Raise (389m/1276ft)
232. Hallin Fell (388m)
233. Fox Haw (385m)
234. Jeffrey's Mount (378m)
235. Heughscar Hill (375m)
236. Stickle Pike (375m)
237. Thorny Bank (375m)
238. Ling Fell (374m/1227ft)
239. The Pike (370m)
240. Latrigg (Skiddaw) (369m/1211ft)
241. Troutbeck Tongue (364m)
242. Side Pike (362m)
243. Sale Fell (359m/1178ft)
244. High Rigg (355.7m)
245. Rannerdale Knotts (355m)
246. Dillicar Knott (349m)
247. Swainson Knott (345m/1132ft)
248. Hagg Hill (342m)
249. In Scar (341.3m)
250. High Rigg SE Top (339m)
251. Boat How (337m/1106ft)
252. Loughrigg Fell (335.1m)
253. Swarth Fell (335m/1099ft)
254. The Bell (335m/1099ft)
255. Top o' Selside (333.3m)
256. Great How (Thirlmere) (333.1m)
257. Bowness Knott (333m/1093ft)
258. Ulgraves (333m/1093ft)
259. Black Fell (323m)
260. Latrigg (Over Water) (322.1m)
261. Gummer's How (321.1m)
262. Aughertree Fell (321m)
263. Rough Crag (Birker Fell) (319m)
264. Birch Fell (318m)
265. Holme Fell (315.7m)
266. Ponsonby Fell (315m/1033ft)
267. Carron Crag (314m)
268. High Hows (313m/1027ft)
269. Tarn Hill (Dunnerdale) (313m/1027ft)
270. Goat Crag (312m)
271. Banks (311m)
272. Keldas (311m)
273. Seat How (311m)
274. Water Crag (305m)
275. Dacre Bank (302m)
276. The Park (302m)
277. Millrigg Knott (299.5m)
278. Burney (298m)
279. Ladies Table (296m/971ft)
280. Bennethead Banks (294.8m)
281. Wallowbarrow Crag (292m)
282. Cold Fell (290.7m)
283. Soulby Fell (290.7m)
284. Salmond's Hill (290.2m)
285. Harrot (290.1m)
286. Bleatarn Hill (290m/951ft)
287. Castle Crag (290m/951ft)
288. Park Fell (284m)
289. Soulby Fell North Top (284m)
290. Gate Crag (283m/928ft)
291. High Doat (283m/928ft)
292. Lowther Park (Penrith) (282m)
293. Knott Hill (281m)
294. Bracelet Moor (280m)
295. Barrow (Dunnerdale) (277m)
296. Low Rigg (277m)
297. High Knott (275m)
298. Latrigg (Windermere) (275m)
299. The Knotts (Ullswater) (274m)
300. Hugill Fell (273m)
301. Flat Fell (272m/892ft)
302. Claife Heights (269.9m)
303. Tom Heights (269m)
304. Black Brows (268m)
305. Banner Rigg (265m)
306. Staveley Fell (265m)
307. Combs (264m)
308. Long Crag (Dunnerdale) (264m)
309. Bassenthwaite Hill (263m)
310. Brantrake Crags (259m)
311. Crook Knott (256m)
312. Watch Hill (255.4m/838ft)
313. Beacon Fell (255m)
314. Clints Crags (255m)
315. Hill Fell (255m)
316. Hawkshead Moor (253m)
317. Grandsire (251m)
318. Great Barrow (250m/820ft)
319. Borwick Hill (249m)
320. Garner Bank (249m)
321. Blawith Knott (248m)
322. Cleabarrow Hill (248m)
323. Fox How (246m)
324. Swinside (244.8m)
325. Latterbarrow (Hawkshead) (244m)
326. Penn (244m)
327. Low Heights (242.5m)
328. Rusland Heights (241.6m)
329. Dunmallet (240m)
330. Tarn Intake (239.2m)
331. Beck Side Intake (239m)
332. Saskills (239m)
333. Orrest Head (238m)
334. Scout Scar (235m)
335. High Tongue (234m)
336. Muncaster Fell (232.1m)
337. School Knott (231.7m)
338. Hooker Crag (231.4m)
339. Shepherds Crag (230.7m)
340. Kerris Hill (230m)
341. Lanty Scar (230m)
342. Summer Sides Wood (230m)
343. Great Green Hows (229m)
344. Scale Ivy Intakes (229m)
345. Pen (228m)
346. Ausin Fell (224m)
347. Moor How (223.6m)
348. Todd Crag (223.5m)
349. Whin Brow (223m)
350. Wool Knott (223m)
351. Hampsfell (222m)
352. Newton Fell (220m)
353. The Hawk (216m)
354. Whitbarrow (215.8m)
355. Lord's Lot (215m)
356. Fisher High (213m)
357. Higher Thorny Slack (212m/696ft)
358. Howside Hill (212m/696ft)
359. Rowan Tree Hill (212m/696ft)
360. Great How (Little Langdale) (211m)
361. Brock Crag (210m)
362. Brackenthwaite Hows (208m/682ft)
363. Cockermouth Golf Course (208m/682ft)
364. Cunswick Scar (207m)
365. Smaithwaite Hill (207m)
366. Grassgarth Heights (205m)
367. Fletcher's Wood (203m)
368. Latterbarrow (Wasdale) (201m)
369. Stott Park Heights (201m)
370. Hart Howe (199.3m)
371. Raven Crag (Eskdale) (199m)
372. Haw Hill (197.9m)
373. Capple Barrow (196m)
374. Little Knott (196m)
375. Heathwaite Hill (195m)
376. Grange Crags (194m)
377. Smithy Mire (192m)
378. Brant Fell (191m)
379. Elfhowe Hill (188m)
380. Tarn Hill (Crosthwaite) (188m)
381. Undermillbeck Common (187m)
382. Cat Crag (186m)
383. Green How (185m)
384. Summer House Knott (185m)
385. Bigland Barrow North Top (182m)
386. Cat Nest (181m)
387. Torver Back Common (178m)
388. Dixon Heights (177m)
389. Bessy Bank (176m)
390. Silver Knott (176m)
391. Rulbuts Hill (175m)
392. Barnsley Hill (174.2m)
393. In Fell (173m)
394. Braithwaite How (172m/564ft)
395. Newton Heads (172m)
396. Slate Fell (171.2m/562ft)
397. Hook Knot (171m)
398. Scott Howe (171m)
399. Coats Hill (170m)
400. Stainton Tower (169m)
401. Latter Barrow (166m)
402. Redhow Crags (166m)
403. Anastice (162.5m)
404. Castlehead (162m/531ft)
405. Redbrow Bank (162m/531ft)
406. Haverthwaite Heights (159m)
407. Barker Knott (158m)
408. Little Loughrigg (155m)
409. Subberthwaite Bank (155m)
410. Old Backbarrow (152m)
411. Mount Wood (151m)
412. Anne Riggs (148m)
413. Middle How (146.3m)
414. Castle Wood Hill (142m)
415. Lease Knott (141.6m)
416. Cowan Head (141m)
417. Heald Brow (140m)
418. Powter How (138.2m/453ft)
419. Crag Coppice (137m)
420. High Guards (137m)
421. Plumgarth Hill (134m)
422. Colton Heights (130m)
423. Lone Riggs (130m)
424. Yewbarrow (Cartmel) (128m)
425. Barrow Crag (127m)
426. High Birkhow (125m)
427. Holm Crag (124.3m)
428. Sizergh Fell (123m)
429. Dalegarth How (121m)
430. Muncaster Castle Hill (115m)
431. Parish Crag (112m)
432. High Pastures (104m)
433. Castle How (Bassenthwaite Lake) (102.6m/337ft)
434. Hodge How (101m)
435. Orchard Hill (96.6m)
436. Stricely Intake (96m)
437. The Knotts (Furness) (95.3m)
438. Longmire Pastures (91m)
439. Thornthwaite Latter Rigg (80m)
440. Crooks Pastures (77m)
441. Mount Pleasant (73m)
442. The Knott (70m)
443. Meathop Fell (59.4m)
444. Nan Hill (55.4m)
445. Newby Haw (49m)
446. The Hawes (49m)
447. Ulpha Fell (47m)
448. Holme (40m)

=== Hills greater than 300 metres in height outside the National Park ===
The boundary with the Yorkshire Dales is taken to be the M6 in the northern part, and the Lune in the southern part.

1. Sandale Hill (373m)
2. Highbanks (366.2m)
3. Greystoke Forest (365.2m)
4. Summerground Crags (361m)
5. Dent (351.4m)
6. Lambrigg Fell (339.6m)
7. Kirkby Moor (335m)
8. Summerhouse Hill (334m)
9. Shooting House Hill (332m)
10. Firbank Fell (324m)
11. Benson Knott (319m)
12. Bank House Moor (311m)
13. Lowther Park (Egremont) (308.2m)
14. High Moor (306m)
15. Knotts (Lunedale) (305m)*
16. Warnell Fell (303.2m)
17. Crag Height (303m)
18. Wilton Fell (302.6m)

*within Yorkshire Dales National Park

== Sorted by parent Marilyns by region ==
To avoid this list becoming infinitely long and arbitrary, only hills with more than 30 m relative height (rising over 98 ft) are included. This includes most, but not all, Wainwrights as well as many other hills.

Topographically, the boundaries of the Lake District may be said to trace the flow of streams from the lowest point between it and the Pennines. This occurs just north of the Howgill Fells and gives the boundaries as, primarily, the River Eden and River Lune. This list therefore includes all hills to the west of those rivers including the so-called 'Westmorland Plateau' to the north of the Howgills.

Hills are grouped as topographically as possible, according to their 'parent Marilyn'. The parent Marilyn of hill A can be found by dividing the nearby area into territories, by tracing the runoff from the key col of each Marilyn. The parent is the Marilyn whose territory hill A resides in. Marilyns are given in bold-faced font.

In the table headers, H stands for height and RH for relative height.

=== Northern Fells ===
==== Skiddaw Group ====
ID	Hill	H	RH	Grid ref.
SKD-1	**Skiddaw**	930.4	705.7	NY260290
SKD-2	Skiddaw Little Man	865	60.6	NY266277
SKD-3	Long Side	734	39	NY248284
SKD-4	Lonscale Fell	715	52	NY285271
SKD-5	Dodd	502	110	NY244273
SKD-6	Latrigg	369	72	NY279247

==== Blencathra Group ====
ID	Hill	H	RH	Grid ref.
BCT-1	**Blencathra**	868	461	NY323277
BCT-2	Bowscale Fell	702	87	NY333305
BCT-3	Bannerdale Crags	683	37	NY335290
BCT-4	Souther Fell	522	c 87	NY355292

==== Derwent Valley ====
ID	Hill	H	RH	Grid ref.
BSY-1	**Binsey**	447	242	NY225355
BSY-2	Latrigg	322	c 66	NY245355
BSY-3	Caer Mote	285	c 58	NY196376
BSY-4	Bassenthwaite Hill	263	49	NY235332
BSY-5	Moota Hill	251	c 65	NY144363
BSY-6	Clints Crags	250	c 53	NY164355

==== Back o' Skiddaw and Plain of Carlisle ====
ID	Hill	H	RH	Grid ref.
KNT-1	**Knott**	710	242	NY296329
KNT-2	Great Calva	690	142	NY291312
KNT-3	Carrock Fell	663	91	NY341336
KNT-4	High Pike	658	69	NY318350
KNT-5	Meal Fell	550	30	NY282337
KNT-6	Great Cockup	526	c 89	NY273333
KNT-7	Lowthwaite Fell	509	c 31	NY278347
KNT-8	Longlands Fell	483	c 36	NY276354
KNT-9	Sandale Hill	373	c 117	NY267398
KNT-10	Green How	321	34	NY258374
KNT-11	Warnell Fell	303	c 54	NY337412
KNT-12	Crosby Hill	87	c 50	NY075382
KNT-13	Parson's Thorn	78	c 36	NY321540
KNT-14	Alavna Roman Fort	56	c 43	NY042374
KNT-15	Hards Farm Hill	c 50	c 35	NY125472
KNT-16	Moorhouse Hall Top	47	c 34	NY269509

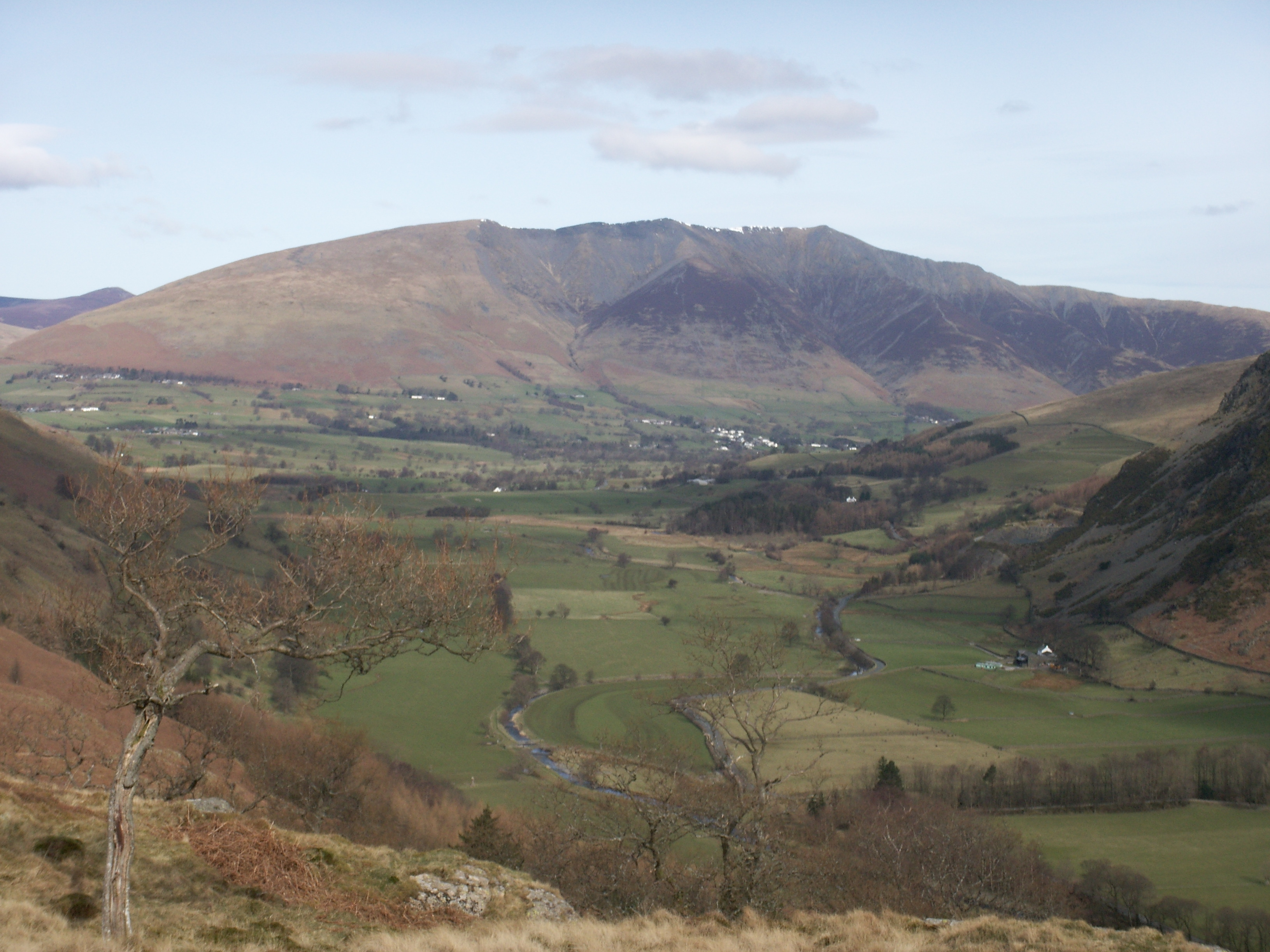
The south face of Blencathra

=== North Western Fells ===
==== Lord's Seat Group ====
ID	Hill	H	RH	Grid ref.
LDS-1	**Lord's Seat**	552	237	NY204265
LDS-2	Whinlatter	525	c 59	NY197249
LDS-3	Ullister Hill	525	c 33	NY209260
LDS-4	Barf	468	c 34	NY214267
LDS-5	Graystones	456	c 79	NY178264
LDS-6	Ling Fell	373	c 97	NY179286
LDS-7	Sale Fell	359	c 137	NY194297
LDS-8	Ladies Table	296	c 65	NY208288
LDS-9	Harrot	292	c 37	NY159275
LDS-10	Powter How	c 135	c 38	NY221267
WCH-1	**Watch Hill**	254	157	NY159318
WCH-2	Cockermouth Golf Course	208	c 40	NY156306
WCH-3	Slate Fell	171	c 45	NY146303

==== Newlands Fells ====
ID	Hill	H	RH	Grid ref.
DHD-1	**Dale Head**	753	397	NY223153
DHD-2	Hindscarth	727	71	NY216165
DHD-3	High Spy	653	148	NY234162
DHD-4	Catbells	451	c 88	NY244198
DHD-5	Castle Crag	290	c 75	NY249159
DHD-6	High Doat	283	c 34	NY247144
DHD-7	Holm Crag	c 118	c 30	NY251171
RBS-1	**Robinson**	737	161	NY201168
RBS-2	High Snockrigg	526	45	NY187169
SWS-1	**Swinside**	244	152	NY243224

==== Braithwaite to Buttermere ====
ID	Hill	H	RH	Grid ref.
GSM-1	**Grasmoor**	852	519	NY174203
GSM-2	Crag Hill	839	117	NY192203
GSM-3	Sail	773	32	NY198202
GSM-4	Wandope	772	30	NY188197
GSM-5	Scar Crags	672	55	NY208206
GSM-6	Whiteless Pike	660	36	NY180189
GSM-7	Causey Pike	637	40	NY218208
GSM-8	Ard Crags	581	c 116	NY207198
GSM-9	Outerside	568	c 75	NY211215
GSM-10	Knott Rigg	556	c 53	NY197189
GSM-11	Barrow	455	c 70	NY227218
GSM-12	Stile End	447	c 35	NY221219
GSM-13	Rannerdale Knotts	355	c 67	NY167182
GSM-14	Brackenthwaite Hows	208	c 60	NY153213
GDP-1	**Grisedale Pike**	791	189	NY198225
GDP-2	Hopegill Head	770	97	NY185221
GDP-3	Hobcarton Crag	739	37	NY193220
GDP-4	Whiteside	719	c 39	NY175221
GDP-5	Dodd	454	c 37	NY169231
GDP-6	Braithwaite How	172	c 55	NY229240

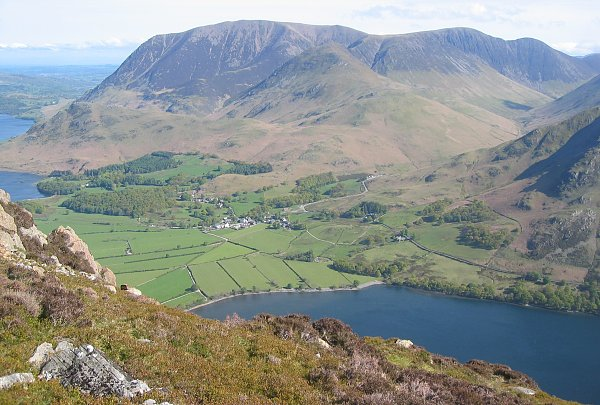
The Grasmoor group

=== Western Fells ===
==== Loweswater Fells and West Cumberland ====
ID	Hill	H	RH	Grid ref.
BKF-1	**Blake Fell**	573	164	NY111197
BKF-2	Carling Knott	544	c 32	NY117203
BKF-3	Gavel Fell	526	c 74	NY117185
BKF-4	Hen Comb	509	140	NY132181
BKF-5	Banna Fell	456	c 40	NY116174
BKF-6	Knock Murton	447	141	NY094190
BKF-7	High Hows	313	c 41	NY096202
BKF-8	Keltonfell Top	296	c 45	NY080183
BKF-9	High Park	247	c 119	NY043211
BKF-10	Mockerkin How	247	c 30	NY099227
BKF-11	Howside Hill	212	c 44	NY092167
BKF-12	High Leys	211	c 43	NY054194
BKF-13	Branthwaite Edge	199	c 40	NY061232
BKF-14	Hannah Moor	141	c 122	NX952134
BKF-15	Winscales Hill	140	c 43	NY027263
BKF-16	Ivy Hill	135	62	NX992124
BKF-17	Stanley Hill	111	c 34	NX979139
BKF-18	Syke Whinns Hill	103	c 36	NX997231
MBK-1	**Mellbreak**	512	260	NY149186
MBK-2	Mellbreak North Top	509	62	NY143195
LWF-1	**Low Fell**	423	270	NY137226
LWF-2	Fellbarrow	416	c 50	NY132242
LWF-3	Sourfoot Fell	412	c 35	NY135233
LWF-4	Darling Fell	391	c 45	NY128225
LWF-5	Pardshaw Crag	191	c 63	NY102256
LWF-6	Redhow Crags	c 166	c 43	NY152233
LWF-7	Crag Hills	165	c 44	NY098271
LWF-8	Harrot Hill	118	c 31	NY107298

==== High Stile range ====
ID	Hill	H	RH	Grid ref.
HSL-1	**High Stile**	807	362	NY170148
HSL-2	Red Pike	755	c 40	NY160154
HSL-3	High Crag	744	35	NY180140
HSL-4	Starling Dodd	633	c 73	NY141157
HSL-5	Great Borne	616	113	NY123163
HSL-6	Seat	561	31	NY185134
HSL-7	Bowness Knott	333	c 40	NY112155

==== Gable Group ====
ID	Hill	H	RH	Grid ref.
GGB-1	**Great Gable**	899	425	NY211103
GGB-2	Green Gable	801	50	NY214107
GGB-3	Brandreth	715	61	NY214119
GGB-4	Fleetwith Pike	648	117	NY205141
GGB-5	Base Brown	646	38	NY225114
GGB-6	Haystacks	597	c 92	NY193132
GGB-7	Green Crag	528	c 32	NY202131
KKF-1	**Kirk Fell**	802	181	NY194104
KKF-2	Kirk Fell East Top	787	36	NY199107

==== Pillar Group and the far western fells ====
ID	Hill	H	RH	Grid ref.
PLR-1	**Pillar**	892	348	NY171121
PLR-2	Scoat Fell	841	86	NY159113
PLR-3	Black Crag	828	34	NY165116
PLR-4	Red Pike	826	c 62	NY165106
PLR-5	Haycock	797	94	NY144107
PLR-6	Iron Crag	642	c 56	NY123119
PLR-7	Yewbarrow	627	142	NY173084
PLR-8	Stirrup Crag	616	33	NY175091
PLR-9	Lank Rigg	541	c 111	NY092120
PLR-10	Crag Fell	523	c 114	NY097144
PLR-11	Grike	488	37	NY086141
PLR-12	Blakeley Raise	389	c 32	NY069135
PLR-13	Swainson Knott	345	c 132	NY079083
PLR-14	Swarth Fell	335	c 38	NY064120
PLR-15	Ponsonby Fell	315	c 34	NY082071
PLR-16	Wilton Fell	302	c 33	NY054112
PLR-17	Cold Fell	293	c 85	NY058092
PLR-18	Flat Fell	272	c 74	NY052137
PLR-19	Head of Haile	183	c 33	NY044090
PLR-20	In Fell	c 177	c 42	NY060060
SAL-1	**Seatallan**	692	193	NY139084
SAL-2	Middle Fell	582	117	NY151072
SAL-3	High Birkhow	124	c 58	NY142045
DNT-1	**Dent**	352	175	NY041129
DNT-2	Winscales Hill	143	c 50	NY024093

=== Central Fells ===
ID	Hill	H	RH	Grid ref.
HRS-1	**High Raise (Langdale)**	762	283	NY280095
HRS-2	Harrison Stickle	736	c 53	NY281074
HRS-3	Ullscarf	726	c 118	NY291121
HRS-4	Pike o'Stickle	709	c 54	NY273073
HRS-5	High Seat	608	136	NY287181
HRS-6	Bleaberry Fell	590	c 43	NY286196
HRS-7	Sergeant's Crag	571	c 46	NY274114
HRS-8	Bell Crags	558	c 32	NY298143
HRS-9	Steel Fell	553	c 82	NY319112
HRS-10	Calf Crag	537	c 56	NY302104
HRS-11	Brown Rigg	463	c 30	NY305146
HRS-12	Raven Crag	461	c 44	NY303187
HRS-13	The Benn	446	c 53	NY302193
HRS-14	Grange Fell	419	c 94	NY268172
HRS-15	Brund Fell	415	c 37	NY265163

ID	Hill	H	RH	Grid ref.
HRS-16	Helm Crag	405	c 70	NY326094
HRS-17	Knotts	400	c 45	NY267144
HRS-18	King's How	392	c 56	NY258167
HRS-19	Shepherds Crag	c 233	c 36	NY264185
HRS-20	Grange Crags	194	c 36	NY256176
HRS-21	Castlehead	161	c 55	NY270227
HRS-22	Butharlyp Howe	106	c 30	NY336079
HRG-1	**High Rigg**	357	189	NY308220
HRG-2	Low Rigg	277	c 55	NY302227
LRG-1	**Loughrigg Fell**	335	172	NY347051
LRG-2	Fox How	246	c 38	NY358048
LRG-3	Lanty Scar	230	40	NY359053
LRG-4	Todd Crag	224	c 30	NY358042
LRG-5	Little Loughrigg	c 155	c 42	NY344039

=== Mid-Western Fells ===
ID	Hill	H	RH	Grid ref.
SFP-1	**Scafell Pike**	978	912	NY215072
SFP-2	Scafell	964	133	NY206064
SFP-3	Ill Crag	935	57	NY223073
SFP-4	Broad Crag	934	52	NY218075
SFP-5	Great End	910	56	NY226083
SFP-6	Bow Fell	902	146	NY244064
SFP-7	Esk Pike	885	112	NY236075
SFP-8	Crinkle Crags	859	138	NY248048
SFP-9	First Crinkle	834	32	NY250045
SFP-10	Shelter Crags	815	31	NY249053
SFP-11	Lingmell	807	c 72	NY209081
SFP-12	Allen Crags	785	60	NY236085
SFP-13	Glaramara	783	121	NY246104
SFP-14	Lincomb Head	721	37	NY242097
SFP-15	Cold Pike	701	46	NY262035
SFP-16	Rossett Pike	651	40	NY249075
SFP-17	Woofgill Pike	632	c 36	NY255113
SFP-18	Seathwaite Fell	632	c 31	NY227097
SFP-19	Black Crags	588	c 33	NY255080
SFP-20	Bessyboot	548	c 41	NY258125
SFP-21	Great How	522	52	NY197040
SFP-22	Throstlehow Crag	404	c 36	NY227043
SFP-23	Round Scar	395	c 30	NY221039

ID	Hill	H	RH	Grid ref.
SFP-24	Goat Crag	312	c 36	NY204017
SFP-25	Great Barrow	c 248	c 40	NY184016
SFP-26	Dalegarth How	121	c 55	NY181003
SFP-27	Hodge How	101	c 33	NY186006
POB-1	**Pike of Blisco**	705	177	NY271042
IGH-1	**Illgill Head**	609	314	NY169049
IGH-2	Whin Rigg	535	c 57	NY152035
IGH-3	Boat How	337	c 81	NY177034
IGH-4	Bleatarn Hill	290	c 32	NY168013
IGH-5	Latterbarrow	c 201	c 87	NY127027
IGH-6	Plumgarth Hill	134	c 30	NY126009
IGH-7	Greengate Wood	c 107	c 39	NY112024
HKN-1	**Hard Knott**	549	154	NY232024
HKN-2	Yew Bank	499	c 35	NY232030
LMR-1	**Lingmoor Fell**	469	245	NY302046
LMR-2	Oakhowe Crag	417	c 30	NY302051
LMR-3	Side Pike	362	c 57	NY293053
LMR-4	Fletcher's Wood	203	c 38	NY323037
MCF-1	**Muncaster Fell**	231	194	SD112983
MCF-2	Silver Knott	174	c 58	SD132992
MCF-3	Barrow Crag	127	c 39	SD096971
MCF-4	Muncaster Castle Hill	114	c 47	SD100961

=== Eastern Fells ===
==== Mell Fells and north-eastern fringe ====
Hill	H	RH	Grid ref.
**Great Mell Fell**	537	198	NY397254
Greystoke Forest	365	c 90	NY406337
Murrah Hill	364	c 32	NY391307
Summerground Crags	361	c 33	NY420317
Dacre Bank	302	c 40	NY451276
Beacon Hill	286	c 143	NY521313
How Top	277	c 30	NY377284
Wan Fell	273	50	NY515355
Lazonby Fell	247	c 80	NY517384
Banks Farm Hill	246	c 50	NY351388
Blaze Fell	242	c 110	NY496433
Brown Rigg	226	c 49	NY514372
Barrock Fell	223	c 97	NY468472
Hill Rigg	197	c 50	NY486462
Thiefside Hill	178	c 51	NY483416
High Stand Hill	c 173	c 47	NY492485
Highbarn Hill	148	c 31	NY563306
Wreay Signal Station	117	c 32	NY448482
Carleton Hill	101	c 32	NY449500
**Little Mell Fell**	505	226	NY423240
Gowbarrow Fell	481	c 98	NY408218
Great Meldrum	437	c 39	NY414223
Underwood Hill	424	c 39	NY425234
Hagg Hill	342	c 34	NY428220
Bennethead Banks	295	c 49	NY443242
Soulby Fell	290	c 43	NY450245
Salmond's Hill	289	c 41	NY454239
Soulby Fell North Top	c 288	c 40	NY457254
The Knotts	274	c 48	NY435217
Dunmallard Hill	c 247	c 85	NY467246

==== Helvellyn range ====
Hill	H	RH	Grid ref.
**Helvellyn**	950	712	NY342151
Catstye Cam	890	63	NY348158
Raise	883	91	NY342174
White Side	863	42	NY337166
Dollywagon Pike	858	50	NY346130
Great Dodd	857	109	NY341205
Stybarrow Dodd	843	68	NY343189
Green Side	795	30	NY352187
Clough Head	726	108	NY333225
Sheffield Pike	675	91	NY369181
Cockley Moor	455	c 39	NY381225
Glenridding Dodd	442	c 45	NY381175
Great How	339	c 142	NY313187
Keldas	311	c 35	NY385163

==== Fairfield Group ====
Hill	H	RH	Grid ref.
**Fairfield**	873	299	NY358117
Hart Crag	822	c 48	NY368112
Dove Crag	792	50	NY374104
Great Rigg	766	31	NY355103
Little Hart Crag	637	c 34	NY387100
**St Sunday Crag**	841	159	NY369134
**Red Screes**	776	260	NY396087
**Seat Sandal**	736	150	NY343115

=== Far Eastern Fells ===
==== High Street range, Pooley Bridge - Kendal ====
ID	Hill	H	RH	Grid ref.
HST-1	**High Street**	828	373	NY440110
HST-2	High Raise (High Street)	802	88	NY448134
HST-3	Rampsgill Head	792	41	NY442128
HST-4	Thornthwaite Crag	784	31	NY431100
HST-5	Harter Fell	778	149	NY459093
HST-6	Ill Bell	757	124	NY436077
HST-7	Kentmere Pike	730	39	NY465077
HST-8	Froswick	720	75	NY435085
HST-9	Branstree	713	137	NY477100
HST-10	Yoke	706	38	NY437067
HST-11	Rest Dodd	696	111	NY432137
HST-12	Loadpot Hill	671	c 48	NY456181
HST-13	Place Fell	657	262	NY405169
HST-14	Selside Pike	655	36	NY490111
HST-15	Rough Crag	628	c 33	NY454112
HST-16	The Nab	576	61	NY434152
HST-17	Angletarn Pikes	567	c 79	NY413148
HST-18	Sallows	516	69	NY437040
HST-19	Beda Head	509	c 61	NY428171
HST-20	High Dodd	501	c 46	NY415182
HST-21	Bampton Common	489	c 34	NY487165
HST-22	**Wansfell**	488	150	NY403052
HST-23	Sour Howes	483	c 36	NY428032
HST-24	Steel Knotts	432	c 50	NY440181
HST-25	Sleddale Forest	429	c 115	NY487015
HST-26	Hollow Moor	426	c 78	NY469040
HST-27	Potter Fell	395	c 30	SD489998
HST-28	Potter Fell East Top	390	c 45	NY497003
HST-29	Hallin Fell	388	163	NY433198
HST-30	Heughscar Hill	375	c 52	NY488231
HST-31	Troutbeck Tongue	364	c 71	NY422064
HST-32	Millrigg Knott	300	c 58	NY464011
HST-33	High Knott	275	c 56	NY454001
HST-34	Hugill Fell	273	c 37	SD459992
HST-35	Banner Rigg	265	c 56	SD426994
HST-36	Crook Knott	256	c 107	SD447960
HST-37	Grandsire	251	c 75	SD432972
HST-38	Borwick Hill	249	c 43	SD445971
HST-39	Cleabarrow Hill	247	c 30	SD438967
HST-40	Orrest Head	238	c 63	SD414993
HST-41	Scout Scar	235	c 126	SD486922
HST-42	School Knott	232	c 41	SD425974
HST-43	Kerris Hill	230	c 41	SD459962
HST-44	Lord's Lot	215	c 60	SD443934
HST-45	Cunswick Scar	207	c 39	SD491943
HST-46	Kendal Fell	198	c 40	SD503931
HST-47	Brant Fell	191	c 65	SD409961
HST-48	Elfhowe Hill	188	c 31	SD469996
HST-49	Tarn Hill	188	c 42	SD450919
HST-50	Cat Crag	186	37	SD424939
HST-51	Scott Howe	169	c 32	SD427929
HST-52	Barker Knott	158	c 39	SD404948
HST-53	Capple Rigg	144	c 30	SD473948
HST-54	Cowan Head	c 141	c 44	SD486972
HST-55	Bell Hill	139	c 30	SD470939
HST-56	Sizergh Fell	124	c 60	SD495869

==== Shap Fells and Westmorland Plateau ====
Hill	H	RH	Grid ref.
**Tarn Crag**	664	160	NY488078
Grey Crag	638	41	NY497072
Swinklebank Crag	553	c 45	NY501049
High Wether Howe	531	66	NY515109
White Howe	530	c 74	NY524042
The Forest	528	c 40	NY528036
Lord's Seat	524	c 36	NY518067
Seat Robert	515	c 30	NY526114
High House Bank	495	80	NY543048
Long Crag	493	31	NY516052
Robin Hood	493	30	NY530059
Whatshaw Common	490	71	NY542062
Pipers Hill	485	c 77	NY558045
Whinash	471	c 40	NY571037
Long Fell	452	c 42	NY557085
Knott	412	c 120	NY647092
Coalpit Hill	401	c 65	NY593109
Whiteside Pike	397	c 47	NY521015
Beacon Hill	397	c 36	NY635099
Nettle Hill	382	c 124	NY716078
Jeffrey's Mount	378	c 49	NY604023
Thorny Bank	375	c 30	NY574058
Hardendale Nab	372	c 46	NY584140

== Groups of mountains ==
- Furness Fells
- Helvellyn range

== See also ==
- List of Wainwrights
- List of Birketts
- List of hills in the Lake District

== Sources ==
- Database of British Hills
