= Watch Hill =

Watch Hill may refer to:

in England

- Watch Hill (Cockermouth), a 254 m Marilyn and Wainwright Outlying Fell near Cockermouth in the Lake District
- Watch Hill (Whitehaven), a 172 m hill near Whitehaven in the Lake District
- Watch Hill (North Pennines), a 604 m hill near Renwick in Cumbria
- Watch Hill Castle, a medieval fortification in Greater Manchester

in the United States

- Watch Hill, New York, a campground and marina on Fire Island
- Watch Hill, Rhode Island, a neighborhood in Westerly, Rhode Island
- Watch Hill Light, a lighthouse in Watch Hill, Rhode Island
- Watch Hill, the former Timex Headquarters campus in Middlebury, CT

== See also ==
- Watchhill, Cumbria, England
- Watchill, Dumfries and Galloway, Scotland
