= Cold Fell =

Cold Fell may refer to:

- Cold Fell (Calder Bridge), a 293m hill in the west of Cumbria, England
- Cold Fell (Pennines), a 621m hill in the north of Cumbria, England
