= Heughscar Hill =

Coordinates: 54°36′03″N 2°47′36″W

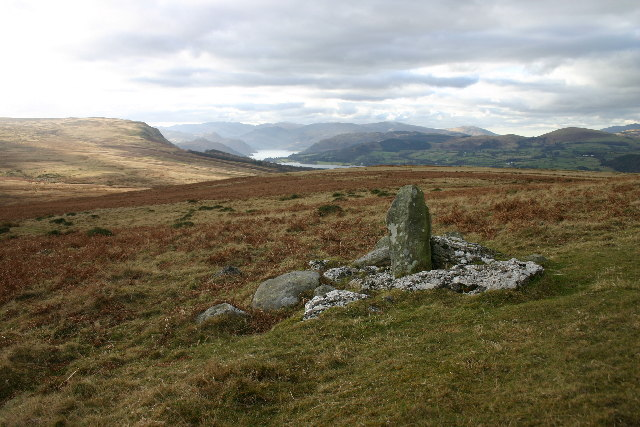
Boundary stone on Heughscar Hill, Ullswater in distance

Heughscar Hill is a hill in the east of the English Lake District, east of Ullswater and north of High Street, Cumbria. It is the subject of a chapter of Wainwright's book The Outlying Fells of Lakeland. It reaches 1,231 feet (375 m) and Wainwright's route is an anticlockwise circuit starting at Askham. He describes it as "A gem for aged fellwalkers".
