= Wallowbarrow Crag =

Hill in Cumbria, England

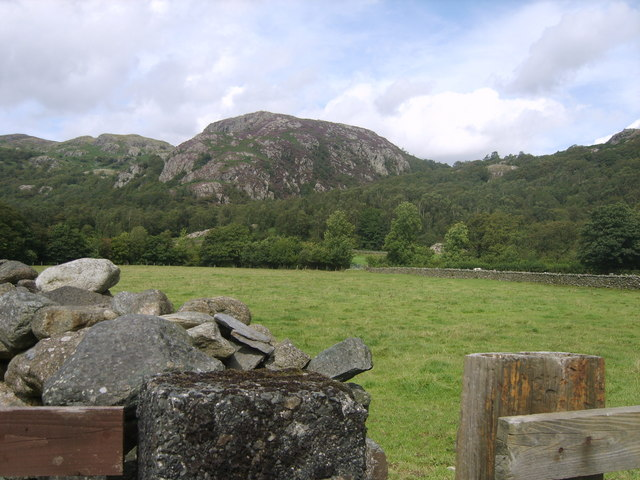
- Wallowbarrow Crag seen from Seathwaite

Highest point
- Elevation: 292 m (958 ft)
- Prominence: 40 m (130 ft)
- Parent peak: Harter Fell
- Listing: Fellranger, Tump
- Coordinates: 54°21′39″N 3°11′54″W

Geography
- Location within the Lake District
- Location: Lake District, England
- OS grid: SD 222968
- Topo map: OS Landranger 96

Wallowbarrow Crag is a hill of 292 metres (958 ft) in the Lake District, England. It is on the west of the Duddon Valley, across the valley from the village of Seathwaite.

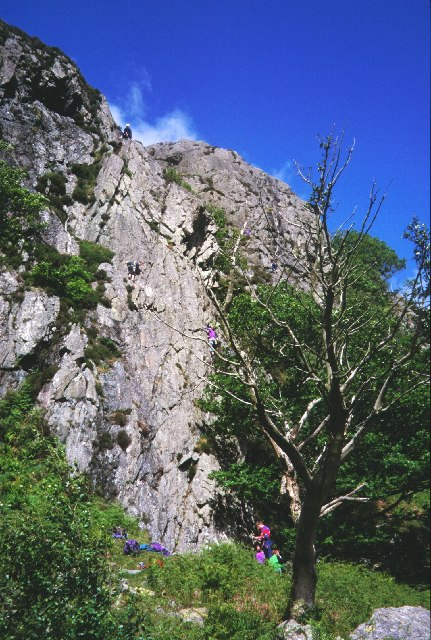
Climbing on Wallowbarrow Crag

Wallowbarrow Crag is a Fellranger, being included in Mark Richards' The Old Man of Coniston, Swirl How, Wetherlam and the South as one of the 18 (now 21) of his 227 (230 with the extension of the national park) summits which are not in Alfred Wainwright's list of 214. It is also classified as a Tump. It is a recognised site for rock climbing.
