= Slate Fell =

- Location within the Lake District

Highest point
- Elevation: 171 m (561 ft)
- Prominence: c. 45 m
- Coordinates: 54°39′38″N 3°19′31″W

Geography
- Location: Lake District, England
- OS grid: NY146303
- Topo map: OS Landranger 89

Slate Fell is a low hill in the North Western part of the English Lake District. It lies only about a mile from the busy market town of Cockermouth, and as such is a popular walk for local dog walkers, the amount of climb being only about 80 metres (250 feet). A public right of way passes over the summit. It is an outlier of the Marilyn Watch Hill, and gives good views of the Lord's Seat group of hills, although it is too low to afford views towards the central Lake District. It lies just inside the boundary of the Lake District National Park.
