= Swinside (Derwent Water) =

Hill in northwest England

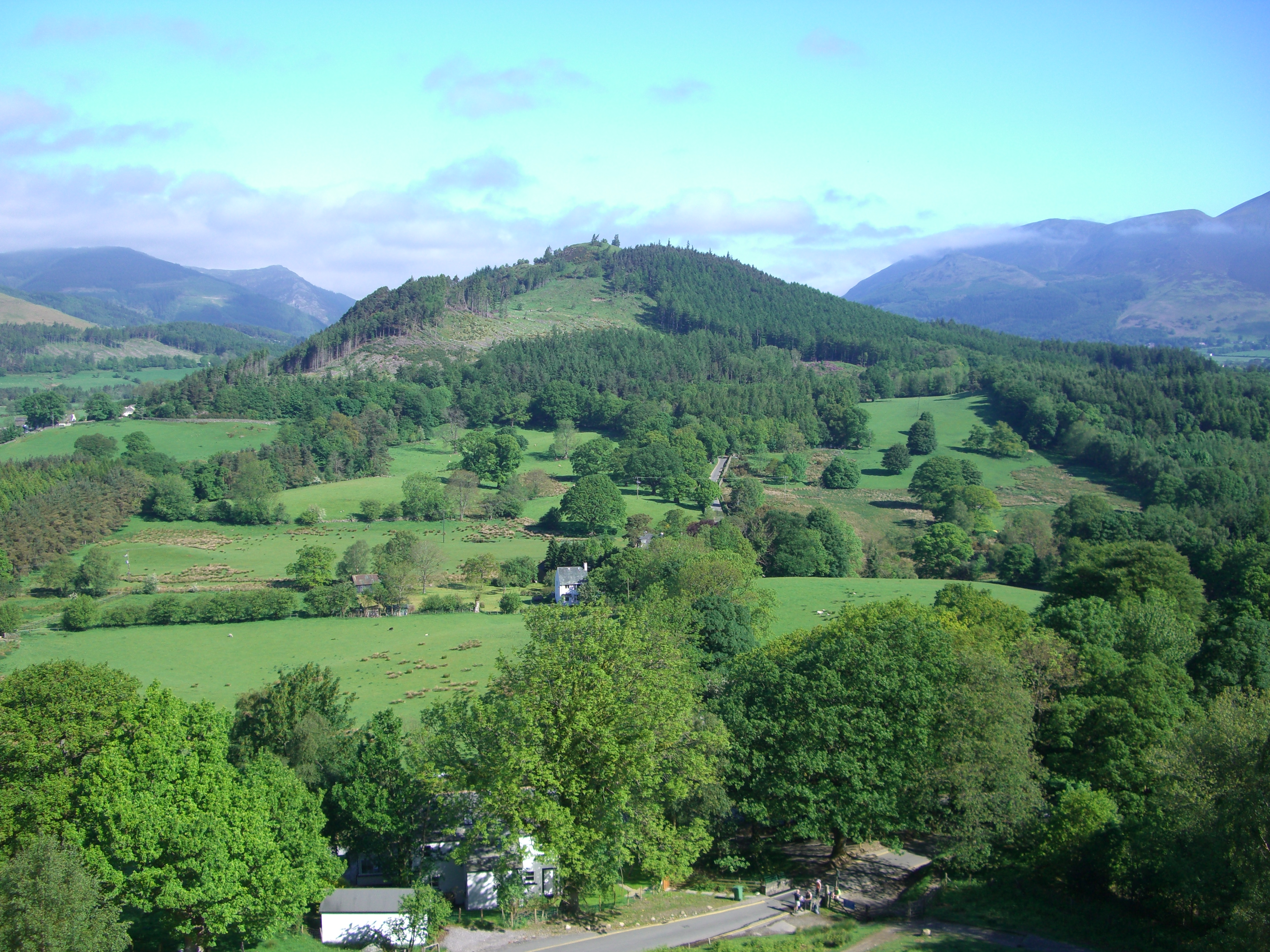
- Seen from the lower part of Cat Bells

Highest point
- Elevation: 244.8 m (803 ft)
- Prominence: 151.9 m (498 ft)
- Parent peak: Dale Head
- Listing: Marilyn
- Coordinates: 54°35′28″N 3°10′23″W

Geography
- Location within the Lake District
- Location: Lake District, England
- OS grid: NY243224
- Topo map: OS Landranger 89, 90

Swinside is a hill in the northwestern area of the English Lake District. It is small, wooded and surrounded by much bigger and more popular fells, meaning it is often overlooked. Alfred Wainwright, for instance, failed to include it in his pictorial guides to fells in the Lake District.

Swinside has an elevation of 244.8 m (803 ft) and a prominence of 151.9 m (498 ft), so unlike many of its grander neighbours, it is a Marilyn as a result of being surrounded by a moat of low boggy ground. Until recently it was also completely covered by trees, but a track now leads up to the summit where the trees have been felled. The land is privately owned and there is no public footpath to the summit although the owner recently allowed local residents from the nearby village of Portinscale to visit the summit on a sponsored walk. It is reported that the hill is used for quad biking trips and that permission to enter on foot can often be obtained on request.
