= Dunmallet =

Hill in Dacre, Cumbria, England

Coordinates: 54°36′51″N 2°49′34″W

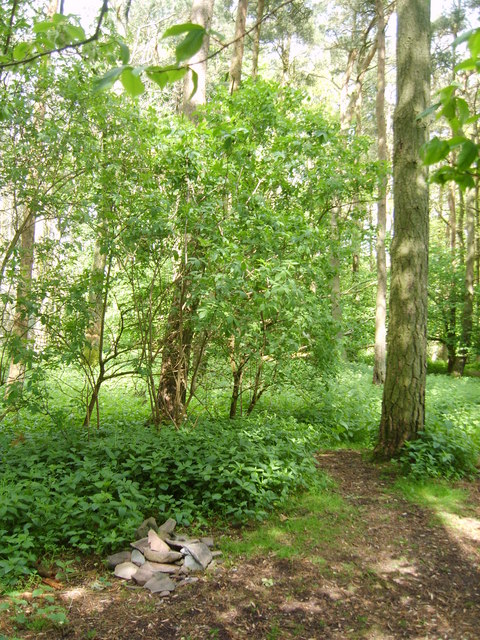
The summit of Dunmallet

Dunmallet or Dunmallard Hill is a small hill in the English Lake District, near Pooley Bridge, Cumbria. It is the subject of a chapter of Wainwright's book The Outlying Fells of Lakeland. It reaches 775 feet (236 m) and Wainwright describes the ascent, from Pooley Bridge, as a "simple after-dinner stroll". He lists two other early spellings: Dunmalloght and Dunmallock The hill is wooded and the views from the top limited.

Remains of an Iron Age hill fort have been detected on the hill.

== Toponymy ==
The name Dunmallet or Dunmallard may either be of Brittonic or Middle Irish origin. The most likely derivation is from Irish dùn-mallacht, meaning "fort of curses". Or else, the name may conserve a Brittonic formation of the elements dīn- ("fort") + mę:l ("bald") + -arδ ("height").
