= Brant Fell =

Hill near Windermere, Cumbria, England

Coordinates: 54°21′32″N 2°54′37″W

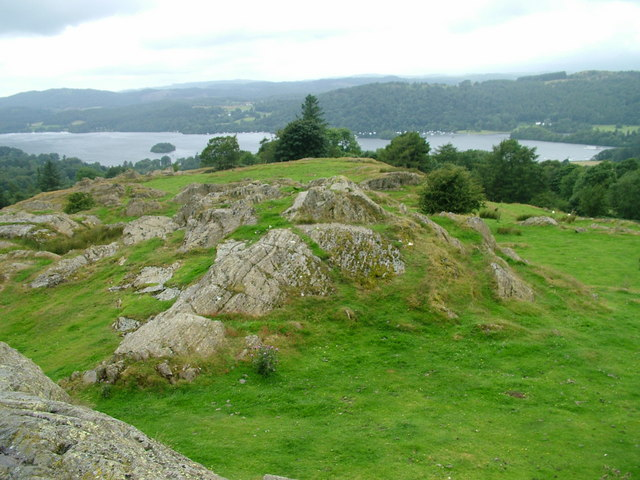
Brant Fell, with part of Windermere in the background

Brant Fell is a hill in the English Lake District, near Bowness-on-Windermere, Cumbria. It is the subject of a chapter of Wainwright's book The Outlying Fells of Lakeland. It reaches 629 feet (192 m). Wainwright's route leaves Bowness along the path of the Dales Way, makes an anticlockwise loop over the viewpoint of Post Knott to the summit, and either returns along the Dales Way or follows a woodland path to Helm Road from where another viewpoint, Biskey Howe, is only a slight detour before continuing down Helm Road to Bowness. He commends its "fine prospect of Windermere".

Below and east of the top are some quite large slabs of Silurian rock which have probably been planed by glacial ice moving out of the Windermere basin. The rocks of the summit are of interest to boulderers.

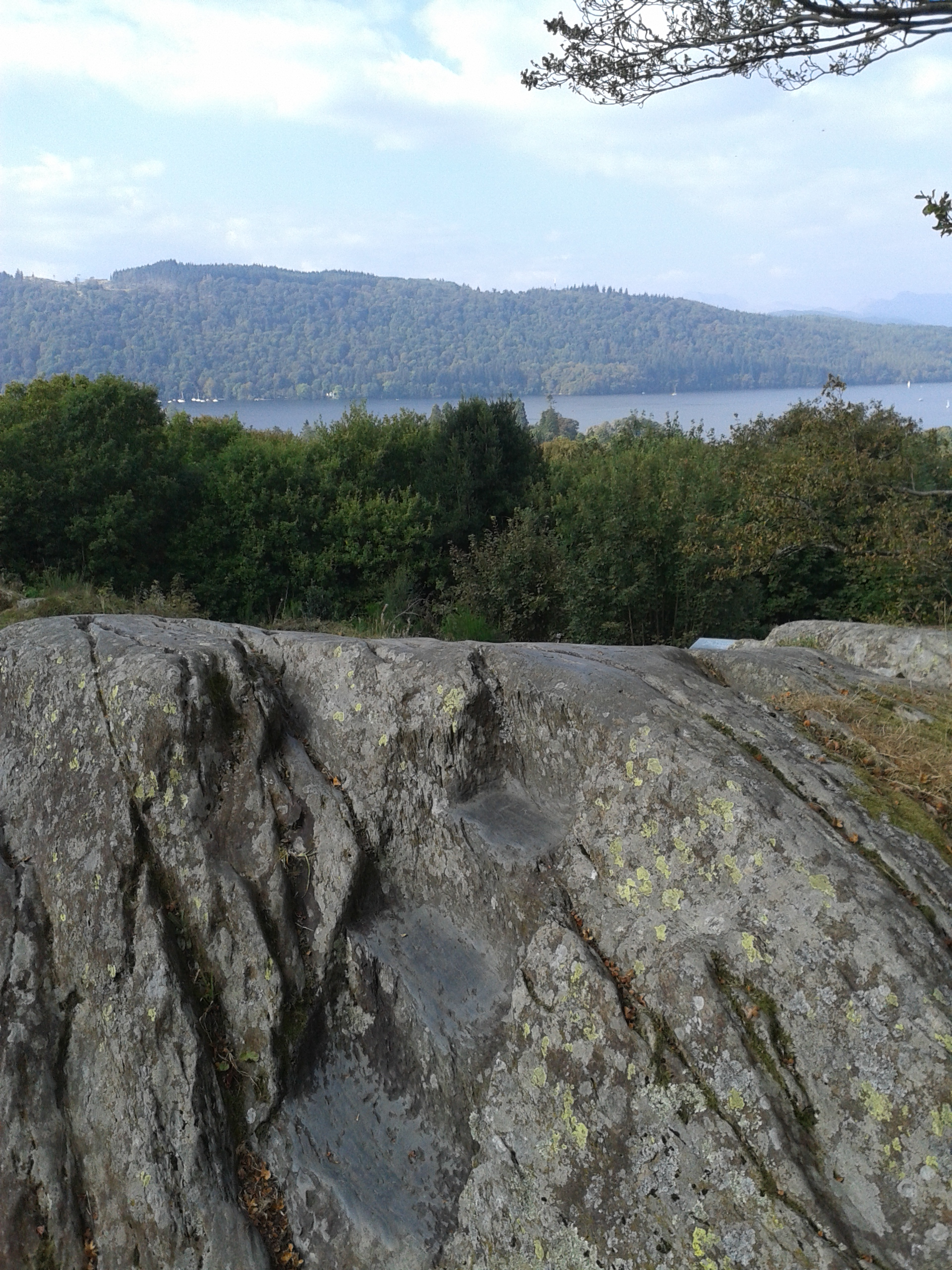
Biskey Howe, included on alternative return route, showing rock cut steps
