= Todd Crag =

- Location within the Lake District

Highest point
- Elevation: 224 m (735 ft)
- Parent peak: Loughrigg Fell
- Listing: Satellite Peak of Loughrigg Fell
- Coordinates: 54°26′14″N 3°00′30″W

Geography
- Location: Cumbria, England
- Parent range: Lake District, North Western Fells
- Topo map: OS Landrangers 89, 90, Explorer OL4

Todd Crag is a hill and a satellite peak of Loughrigg Fell at 224 m (735 ft) it is not classed as a fell but is a vantage point near Ambleside.

== Topography ==
The hill is surrounded with other mountains to the north and north west and to the south Windermere water. To the East is Ambleside and other eastern fells. It is not to be confused with the Todd Crag which lies between the Bannisdale Beck and the Longsleddle valley.

=== Ambleside ===
A sinister looking hill with its Eastern and Southern flanks covered by trees leading into a grasslands towards the rocky outcrop on top with its sharp and spiky rocks that look like teeth or fangs. After the summit there is a slight depression as the ridge continues towards Loughrigg Fell.

=== Clappersgate (A593) ===
There is not much of a view apart from trees leading up from the A593 past the grand houses and just sticking up is The Tarn Tor Crags.

=== Wrey Castle and the B5286 ===
The entire South Flank, including the summit and the rest of the tarn tor crags, can be viewed here.

== Geology ==
The geology on the hill is made up of dacitic welded lapilli tuff and volcaniclastic sandstone and other Lakeland rocks that surround the area.

== Ascent ==
The ascent starts at Rothey Park the route then follows the road over the bridge. When you get to the cattlegrids take a sharp left up the steep road. The route then follows this road until it gets to a wall with slate steps where the woods start. The route turns left going through the wood and over the bridge. It follows the path up to the style (the style has been removed) where the route get the first glimpse of the rocky outcrop that is seen from Ambleside, this means the start of the Tarn Tor Crags.

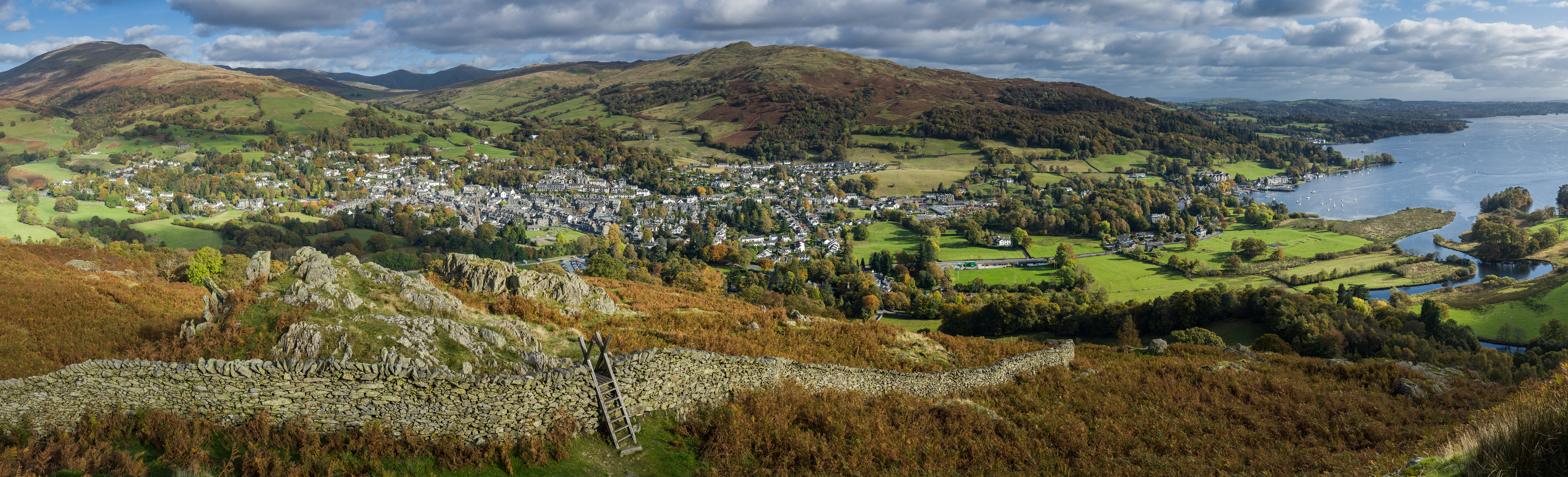
Ambleside View of Ambleside from near the summit of Todd Crag

== Summit ==
At the summit are views of Windermere and other valleys. The summit is the second Crag it is marked by a small cairn which will be replaced with a better marker in the near future.
