= Firbank Fell =

- Location within Cumbria

Highest point
- Elevation: 310 m (1,020 ft)
- Coordinates: 54°20′21″N 2°36′16″W

Geography
- Location: Cumbria, England
- OS grid: SD608939
- Topo map: OS Landranger 97

Firbank Fell is a hill in Cumbria between the towns of Kendal and Sedbergh that is renowned as a place where George Fox, the founder of the Religious Society of Friends (Quakers), preached.

Fox described what happened there on 13 June 1652 in this way:

While others were gone to dinner, I went to a brook, got a little water, and then came and sat down on the top of a rock hard by the chapel. In the afternoon the people gathered about me, with several of their preachers. It was judged there were above a thousand people; to whom I declared God's everlasting truth and Word of life freely and largely for about the space of three hours.

Because of Fox's preaching there, the site is sometimes called "Fox's Pulpit". A plaque on the rock there commemorates the event, which is sometimes considered the beginning of the Friends movement.

Firbank Fell is now immortalised as a place of Quaker history in one of the four houses at the Quaker school Bootham School.
