= Brackenthwaite Hows =

Hill in North West England

Coordinates: 54.5803°N 3.3111°W

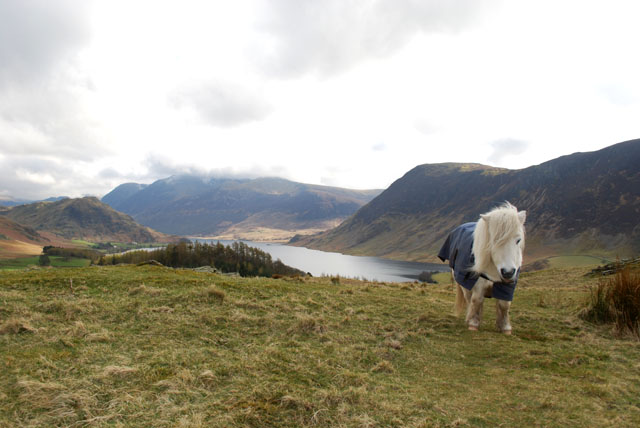
The view from the summit of Lanthwaite Hill in April 2008

Brackenthwaite Hows (also known as Lanthwaite Hill) is a hill in the Lake District of North West England.

Crummock Water, Looking Towards Buttermere, a view from the hill was painted by J. M. W. Turner in 1797.

In 2019 the National Trust paid £202,000 for 77 acres of land comprising the site from three different owners. One of the three owners was Ruth and David Hill who had donated other parcels of land in the vicinity to the National Trust, had owned 37.5% of Brackenthwaite Hows since 1990. The Hills approached the National Trust to float the idea of the NT purchasing the 62.5% from their co owners and in consideration for that, the Hills would donate their entire 37.5% share.

The general manager for the National Trust in the North Lakes, Tom Burditt, said that the trust would "explore ways to improve access routes to the historic viewing station" and "work hard to support this area of high cultural and ecological importance, which neighbours woodland, fells and lakes that we already look after. We plan to maintain its mosaic of veteran and younger trees and heathland habitats which provide a haven for rare birds, bluebells and red squirrels".

It is 208 meters in height.

Alfred Wainwright in The North Western Fells, the sixth volume of his Pictorial Guide to the Lakeland Fells from 1964 described the hill as "an insignificant mound in stature and seems hardly worth turning aside to visit. But do it." and drew an illustration of himself admiring the view of High Stile from the hill.
