= Sallows =

Fell in the Lake District, Cumbria, England

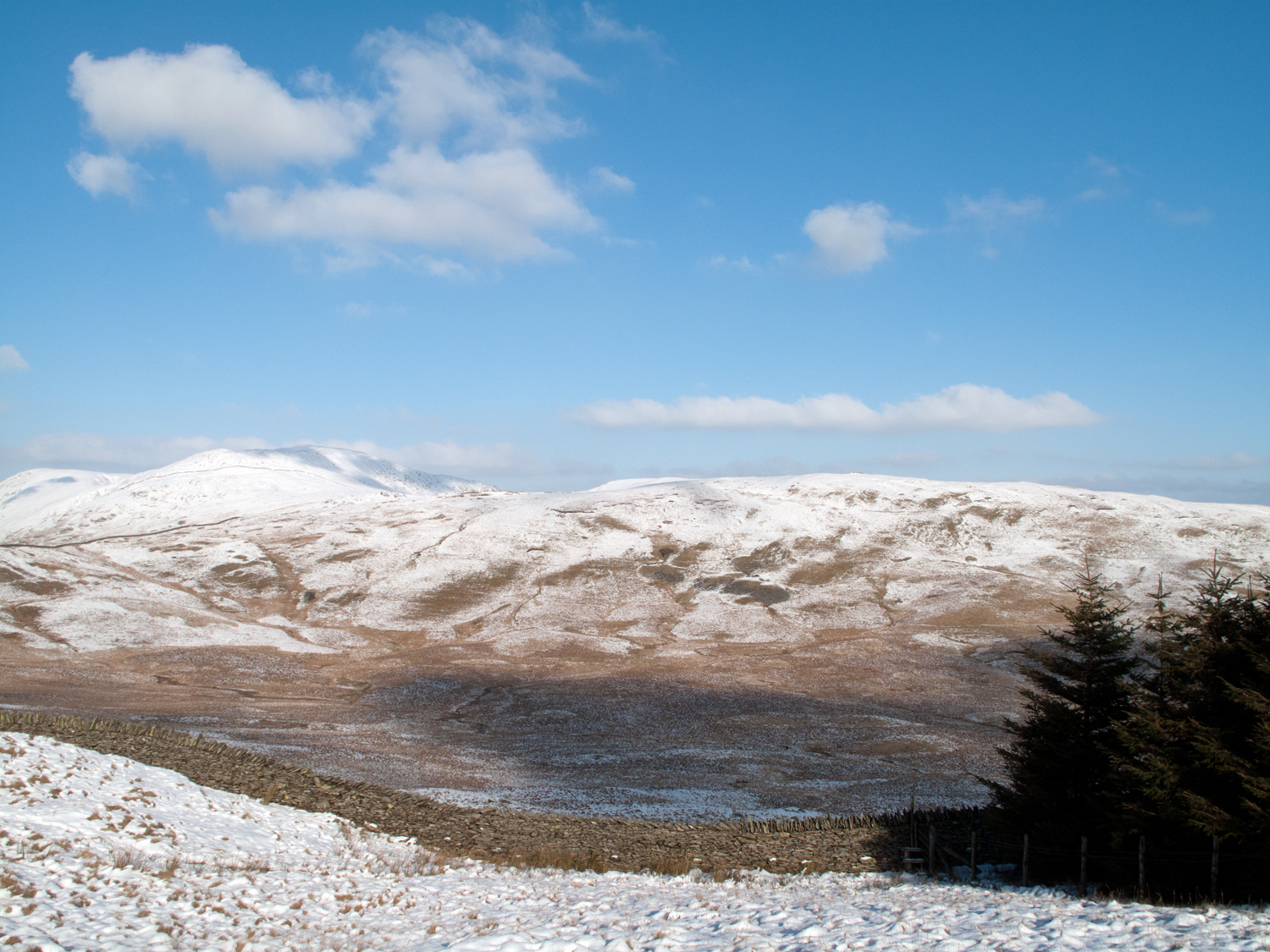

Highest point
- Elevation: 516 m (1,693 ft)
- Prominence: c. 69 m
- Parent peak: Ill Bell
- Listing: Wainwright
- Coordinates: 54°25′42″N 2°52′10″W

Geography
- Location within the Lake District
- Location: Cumbria, England
- Parent range: Lake District, Far Eastern Fells
- OS grid: NY437040
- Topo map: OS Explorer OL7

Sallows is a fell in the English Lake District, rising between the valleys of Kentmere and Troutbeck. It is the highest point in the upland area to the south of Garburn Pass, variously termed Kentmere Park and Applethwaite Common on Ordnance Survey maps.

== Topography ==
Sallows and its sister fell Sour Howes together form a horse-shoe shaped mass, with the opening to the south east. This is the catchment of Park Beck, a tributary of the River Kent. Sallows lies to the north of the beck and connects around the head of the little valley via the ridge of Moor Head. The southern flank of Sallows, above Park Beck, is smooth and grassy, other than for the remains of a quarry. The access track to these workings is still in existence, providing the easiest access from the east.

The eastern end of Sallows falls in long easy slopes for half a mile toward the Kent valley, although there are a couple of low crags, particularly on Scour Rigg. The high ground then turns southerly at the subsidiary top at Mould Rigg (350 metres (1,150 ft)), finally petering out at the confluence of Park Beck and the Kent. The slopes above the Kent are steep and predominantly covered in broadleaved plantations.

Below these trees the river broadens into the oddly shaped Kentmere Tarn. A natural waterbody was drained in the 1830s to extend the available farmland, but the scheme failed and merely resulted in an area of marsh. It was later found that the tarnbed was rich in diatomite, a mineral used to produce thermal insulation. Extraction began in the 1930s and continued until 1971, producing the lines of the present man-made tarn.

To the north of Sallows is Garburn Pass (Restricted Byway), the original route for pedestrian and horse-borne trade between Troutbeck and Kentmere. Whilst designated as a bridleway between 2006 and 2009, the road had seen considerable use from off-road vehicles, an activity causing controversy between drivers and walkers such that it was converted into a restricted byway. From the pass summit at Garburn Nook (447 metres (1,466 ft)), the land rises northwards up a broad ridge to Yoke and Ill Bell.

== Summit ==
The summit of Sallows is covered in grass and heather, the highest point occupied by a curving ridge of shale about thirty feet long. This in turn carries a small cairn. There is a good view westwards to the Scafell and Coniston Old Man groups, Eastwards towards the Kentmere Horseshoe, with distant sightings from Black Combe to the Pennines.

== Ascents ==
In addition to climbs from Kentmere or Ings via the quarry track, Sallows is easily reached from the summit of Garburn Pass. A narrow path also leads around Moor Head to Sour Howes, allowing a circuit of Park Beck to be made.
