= Knock Murton =

Hill in Cumbria, England

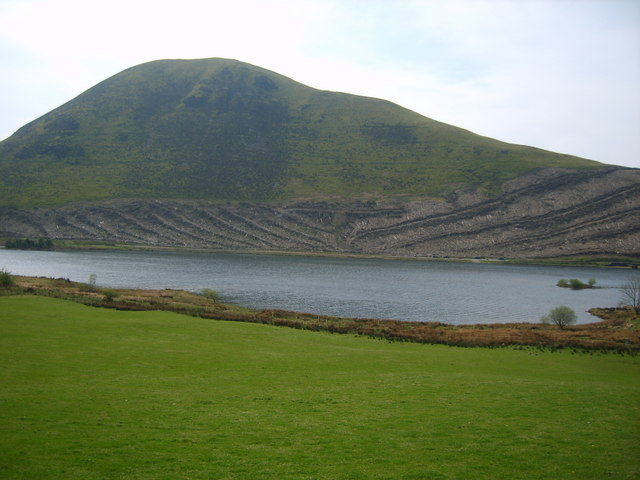
- Knock Murton seen across Cogra Moss reservoir

Highest point
- Elevation: 446.4 m (1,465 ft)
- Prominence: 140 m (460 ft)
- Parent peak: Blake Fell
- Listing: HuMP, Tump, Birkett, Synge, Fellranger, Clem
- Coordinates: 54°33′31″N 3°24′05″W

Geography
- Location within the Lake District
- Location: Lake District, England
- OS grid: NY095191
- Topo map: OS Outdoor Leisure 4

Knock Murton or Murton Fell is a hill of 464.4 metres (1,524 ft) in the north west of the Lake District, England. It lies in the Cumberland district in Cumbria.

It is classed as a Fellranger, being described by Richards in his book series. It is among the 21 such summits (originally 18 before the extension of the Lake District) which are not included in Wainwright's list of 214. In the Blake Fell section of the 2020 edition of Wainwright's The Western Fells it is noted that Wainwright had described it as "the forbidden peak" and that "A tight forest fence at one time encircled the whole of Murton Fell", but that there is now free access for walkers either from the forest road to the south or over a stile in the fence to the north.
