= Watch Hill (Whitehaven) =

Hill near Whitehaven in England

- Location within the Lake District

Highest point
- Elevation: 172 m (564 ft)
- Coordinates: 54°34′24″N 3°32′43″W

Geography
- Location: Lake District, England
- OS grid: NY002210
- Topo map: OS Landranger 89

Watch Hill is a small hill lying on the western fringe of the Lake District in England, north east of Whitehaven. It should not be confused with another Watch Hill some 19 kilometres (12 mi) to the north-east, near Cockermouth, which is classified as a Marilyn and is one of Wainwright's Outlying Fells. The hill has an elevation of 172 metres (564 ft).
