= Great How =

Hill in Cumbria, England

- Summit cairn looking NW towards Yewbarrow

Highest point
- Elevation: 1,713 ft (522 m)
- Prominence: 171 ft (52 m)
- Parent peak: Scafell Pike
- Listing: Dodd, Dewey, Birkett, Synge, Fellranger
- Coordinates: 54°25′55″N 3°15′15″W

Geography
- Location within the Lake District
- Location: Lake District, England
- OS grid: NY187048
- Topo map: OS Outdoor Leisure 6

Great How or Great Howe is a hill of 522 metres (1,713 ft) in the west of the English Lake District, lying south of Scafell Pike and east of Burnmoor Tarn. It lies in the civil parish of Eskdale, the unitary authority area of Cumberland and the ceremonial county of Cumbria.

It is classed as a Fellranger, being described by Richards in the Wasdale volume of his book series. It is among the 21 such summits (originally 18 before the extension of the Lake District) which are not included in Wainwright's list of 214. It is also classed as a Dodd, Dewey, Birkett and Synge.
