= Orrest Head =

Hill in the Lake District, England

Coordinates: 54°23′11″N 2°54′12″W

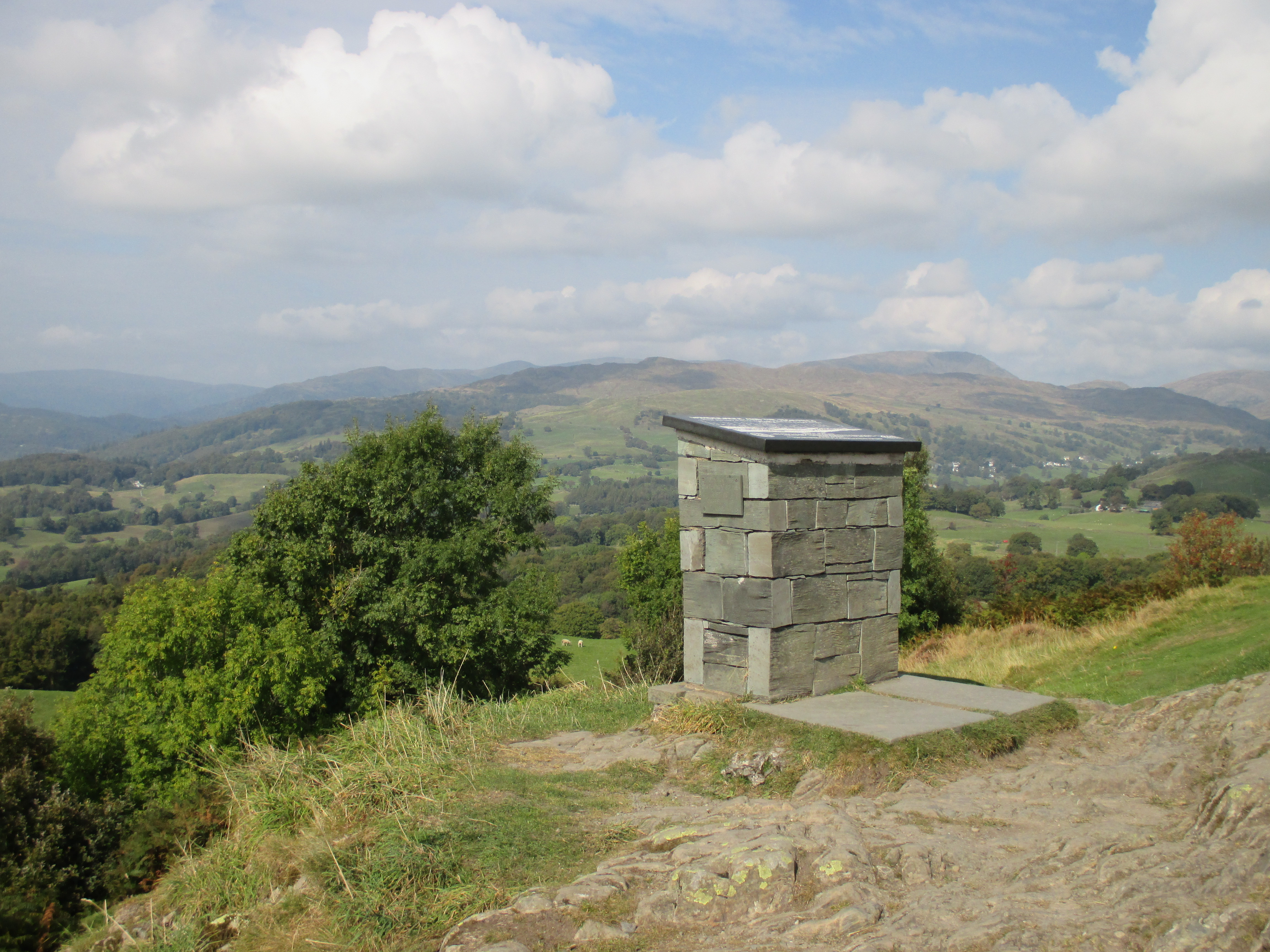
View to the north-east from the summit of Orrest Head

Orrest Head is a hill in the English Lake District on the eastern shores of Windermere. It is the subject of a chapter in Wainwright's The Outlying Fells of Lakeland, and the first fell he climbed. He describes it as "our first ascent in Lakeland, our first sight of mountains in array across glittering waters, our awakening to beauty" and also as "a fitting finale, too, to a life made happy by fellwandering".

On the summit is a panorama naming the key visible fells which include the Old Man of Coniston, Scafell Pike, Great Gable, Fairfield and the Langdale Pikes.

Orrest Head is typically climbed directly from the town of Windermere near the station. Access is made via a reinstated Victorian carriageway which leads towards the summit. The route has been adopted by the Lake District National Park Authority as its 50th "Miles Without Stiles" route which makes it suitable for those with pushchairs and motorised off-road mobility scooters. There are several shorter but steeper shortcuts in a few places but the pathway is much easier if a bit longer.

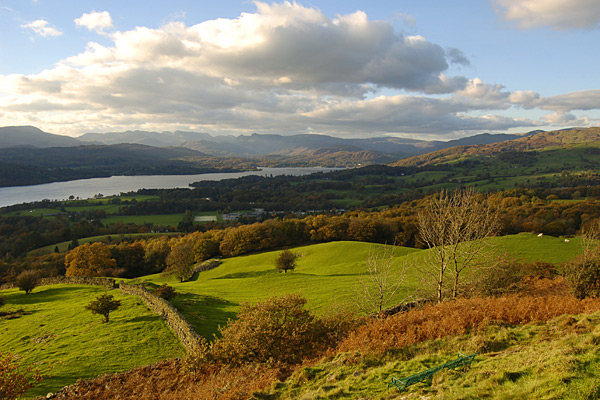
View towards Windermere from Orrest Head Summit, November 2006
