= School Knott =

Hill in the Lake District, Cumbria, England

Coordinates: 54°22′18″N 2°53′10″W

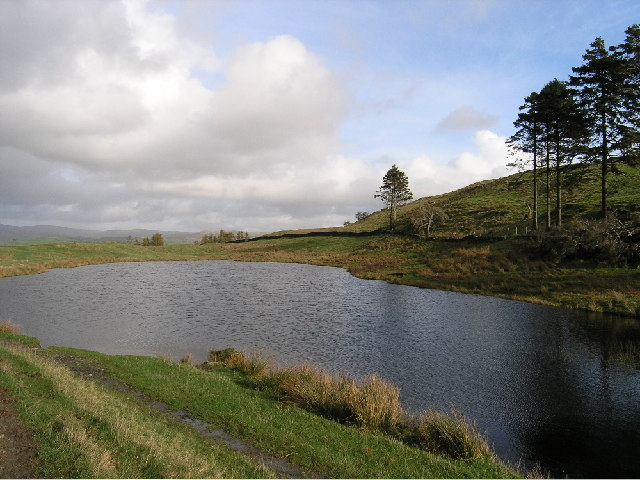
Schoolknott Tarn, south-east of the summit of School Knott

School Knott is a hill in the Lake District, England, to the east of Windermere town, Cumbria. It is the subject of a chapter of Wainwright's book The Outlying Fells of Lakeland. His recommended route starts at Windermere railway station and includes Grandsire at 818 feet (249 m) and a nameless summit at 806 feet (246 m). The summit is at 760 feet (230 m) and offers a view of four sections of Windermere, the lake. It has a rocky outcrop but no trig point and, as reported by Wainwright, no cairn. Schoolknott Tarn is to the south-east of the summit.
