= Clints Crags =

Small fell in Cumbria, England

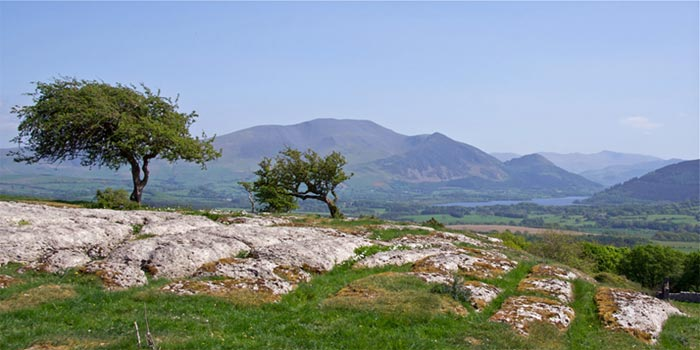

Highest point
- Elevation: 245 m (804 ft)
- Prominence: 53 m (174 ft)
- Parent peak: Binsey
- Listing: Outlying Wainwright
- Coordinates: 54°42′22″N 3°17′42″W

Geography
- Location within the Lake District
- Location: Lake District, England
- Parent range: Northern Fells
- Topo map: OS Landranger 96

Clints Crags is a small fell in the north of the English Lake District near Blindcrake, Cumbria. It has its own chapter in Alfred Wainwright's The Outlying Fells of Lakeland. He describes a circular walk from Blindcrake, and laments that at the time of writing (1974): "This is a walk on public footpaths, but until somebody removes the barbed wire and other obstacles to legitimate progress it can be recommended only to gymnasts." It reaches 804 feet (245 m). Since the time of writing the barbed wire has been removed and the path to the summit is clear of obstructions.

Clints Crags offers a pleasant and easy stroll to the summit from the village of Blindcrake. The gradient of the crags is much steeper rising north out of the Isel valley; however. there are no footpaths to the crags from the valley bottom. There is an old limestone quarry near the summit of the hill, now an SSSI, home to a rare species of newt that breeds in the old quarry lakes. The summit is a large expanse of limestone outcrops and pavement, which is also a designated SSSI. The fragile limestone habitat supports various rare calcareous species of flora and fauna.

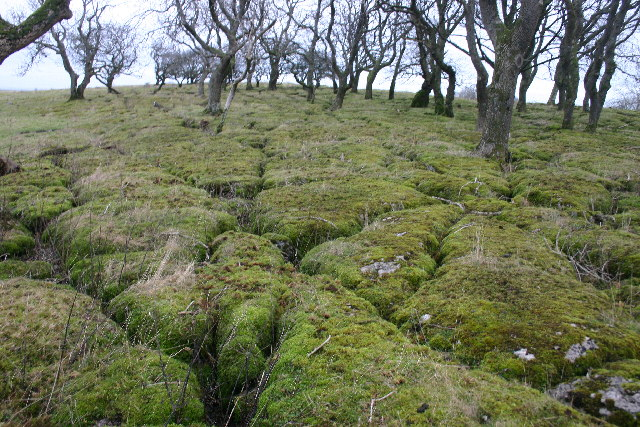
Limestone pavement on Clints Crags

== Other places of the same name ==
There are other places called Clints Crags in Wensleydale, North Yorkshire (just south of Leighton Reservoir) and above Ireshopeburn in Weardale, County Durham.
