= Sour Howes =

Fell in the Lake District, Cumbria, England

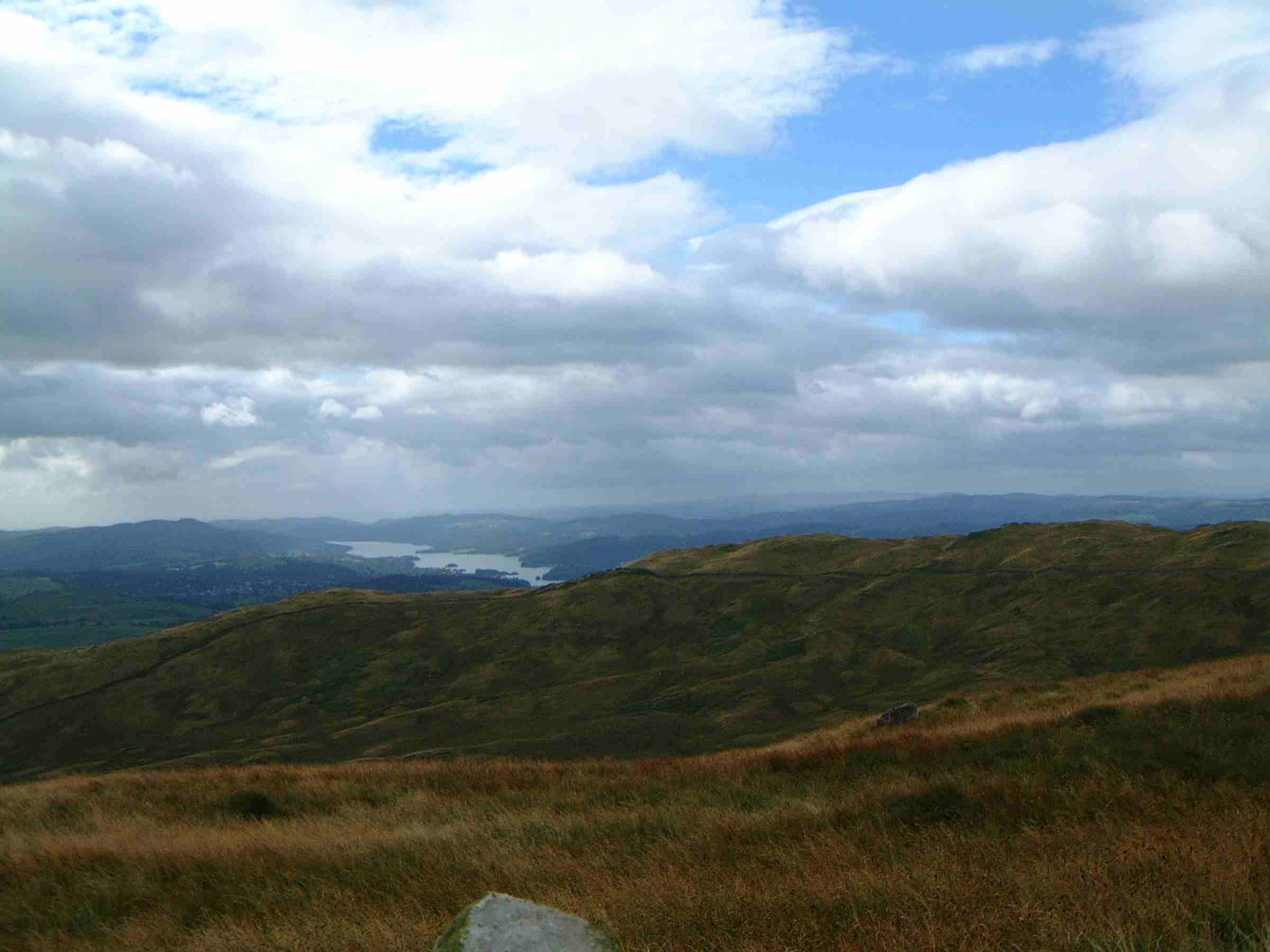
- Sour Howes with Windermere beyond from Sallows.

Highest point
- Elevation: 483 m (1,585 ft)
- Prominence: c. 34 m
- Parent peak: Sallows
- Listing: Wainwright
- Coordinates: 54°25′16″N 2°53′04″W

Geography
- Location within the Lake District
- Location: Cumbria, England
- Parent range: Lake District, Far Eastern Fells
- OS grid: NY427032
- Topo map: OS Landranger 90, OS Explorer 7

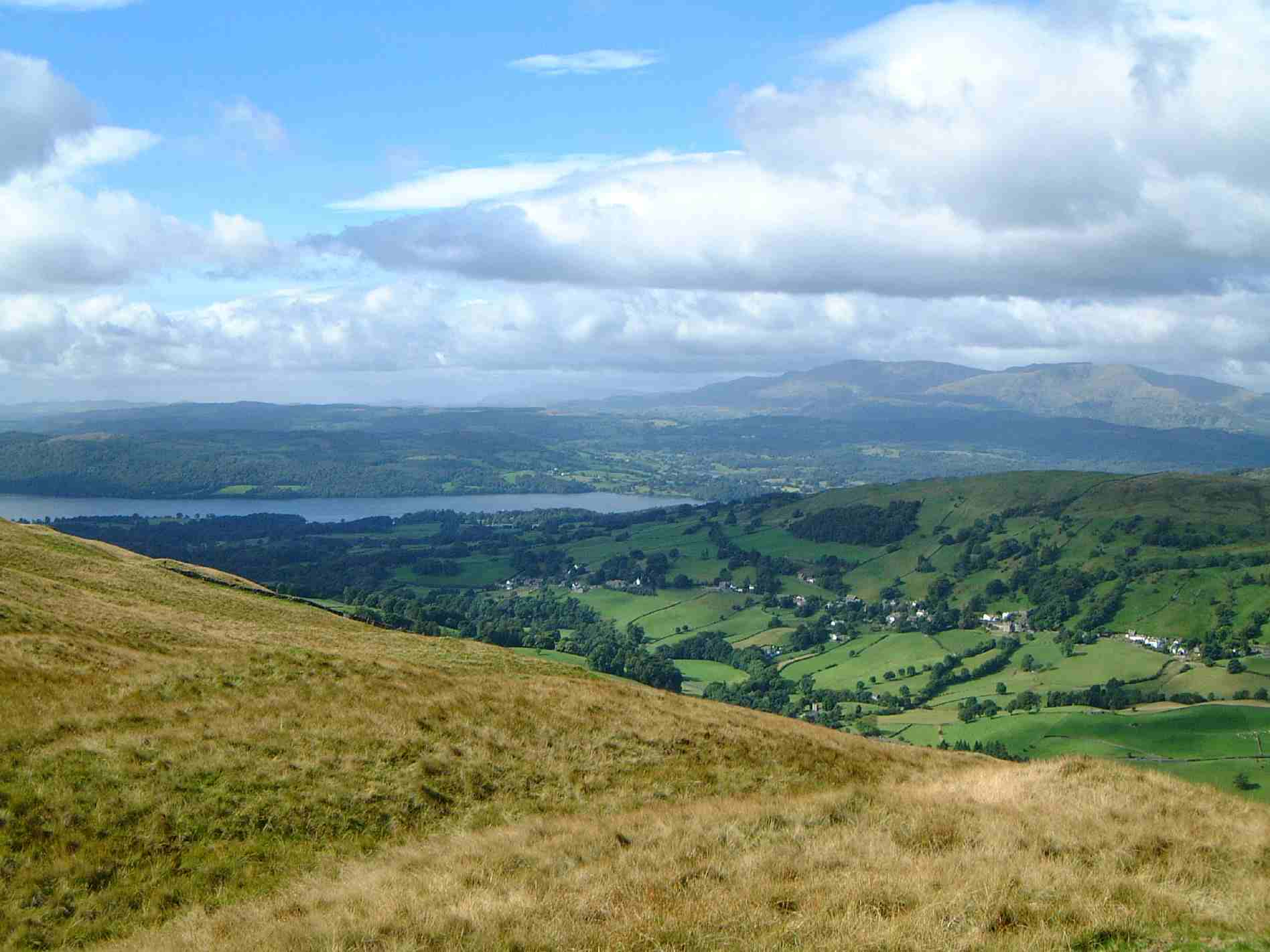
The head of Windermere with the Coniston Fells beyond from Sour Howes.

Sour Howes is a small fell in the English Lake District. It is situated five kilometres east of Ambleside, between the Troutbeck and Kentmere valleys and is one of the two separate fells on Applethwaite Common (the other being Sallows).

== Topography ==
Sour Howes, which reaches a height of 483 m (1,585 ft) is mostly grassy although heather grows on the eastern slopes, a high dry stone wall crosses the top and links with the neighbouring fell of Sallows, which lies just over a kilometre to the north east, and with Sour Howe’s subsidiary top of Capple Howe (445 m, 1,460 ft) which is located 600 metres to the south east.

The fells western flank falls away steeply to the Troutbeck valley, this slope is traversed lower down by the Dubbs Road bridleway which goes north joining the track which crosses the Garburn Pass (Restricted Byway), on its way to Kentmere. The disused and now wooded Applethwaite quarry stands on these western slope alongside the Garburn track, it is quite substantial and an interesting place to explore. On its eastern side Sour Howes drops more gently to the Kentmere valley with the stream of Park Beck draining the fell and being a tributary of the River Kent. There are some well made grouse butts amongst the heather on these eastern slopes.

== Ascents ==
Sour Howes can be ascended from the Troutbeck or Kentmere valleys, its ascent can be combined with the adjacent fell of Sallows and also with a visit to the more stirring Yoke to Thornthwaite Crag ridge to the north. The ascents from either valley utilise the Garburn Pass track to its highest point before going south to the summit following the dry stone wall.

== Summit ==
The top of the fell is a series of knolls with the highest of these marked by a pile of stones. From here, a vista of the high mountains to the west can be seen, as well as to the south, Windermere and Morecambe Bay.
