= Iron Crag =

Mountain in Cumbria, England

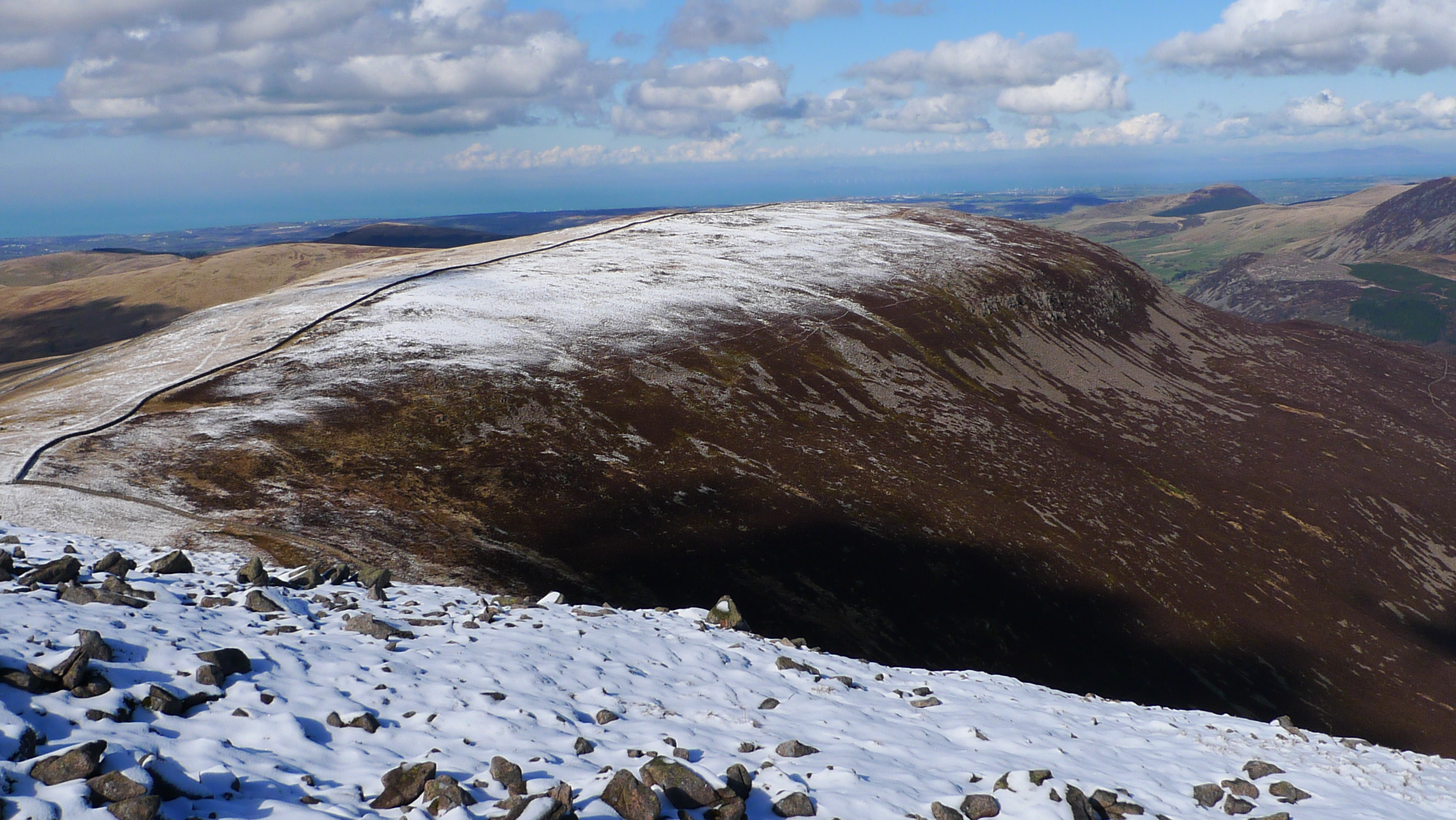
- Iron Crag from Caw Fell

Highest point
- Elevation: 640 m (2,100 ft)
- Prominence: 54 m (177 ft)
- Parent peak: Pillar
- Listing: Hewitt, Nuttall, Fellranger, Simm, Birkett, Synge, Buxton & Lewis, Bridge
- Coordinates: 54°29′43″N 3°21′18″W

Geography
- Location within the Lake District
- Location: Cumbria, England
- Parent range: Lake District, Western Fells
- OS grid: NY123119
- Topo map: OS Landranger 89, 90, Explorer OL4, OL6

Listed summits of Iron Crag
Name	Grid ref	Height	Status
Boat How	NY111136	363 m (1,191 ft)	

Iron Crag is a mountain in the English Lake District, standing between Crag Fell and Caw Fell. The name of the fell is the source of some confusion, as the summit is unnamed on Ordnance Survey maps. Iron Crag apparently refers to the rocky outcrop below the summit, while the lower slopes are referred to as Ennerdale Fell. The Western aspect of the lower slopes, facing Ennerdale Water is known as The Side.

== Topography ==
Iron Crag is separated from Caw Fell by an unnamed col at the watershed of Bleaberry Gill and Silvercove Beck. The Western slopes are separated by a much shallower col leading to Whoap. The gentler southern aspect, which is covered by rough grassland, covers a roughly triangular area, bordered on the South by Caw Fell and Bleaberry Gill, and on the West by Lank Rigg and Whoap. The Ennerdale Wall, running over the length of the ridge, marks a striking transition in vegetation, with the Northern slopes of Iron Cragg being mostly carpeted by heather.

== Summit and view ==
The true summit, marked by a small cairn, is on the Northern aspect of the Ennerdale Wall.

Iron Crag is classed as a Fellranger, being described by Richards in the Wasdale volume of his book series. It is among the 21 such summits (originally 18 before the extension of the Lake District) which are not included in Wainwright's list of 214. Richards describes Iron Crag as "Great ridge between Crag Fell and Caw Fell, dividing the barren pasture of Kinniside Common from the rank heather of Ennerdale".

== Ascents ==
From the Fell Road at Kinniside, a track known as the Black Potts road leads Eastwards for around three miles, past Blakeley Raise, Grike and Crag Fell before ending at the lower slopes of Boat How. From here, the Ennerdale Wall can be followed to the summit area of Iron Crag.

== Crashed Aircraft ==
The remains of a Royal Canadian Air Force Sabre Mk6 (23380), which crashed on 26 June 1959, can be found close to the summit of Iron Crag

== Gallery ==
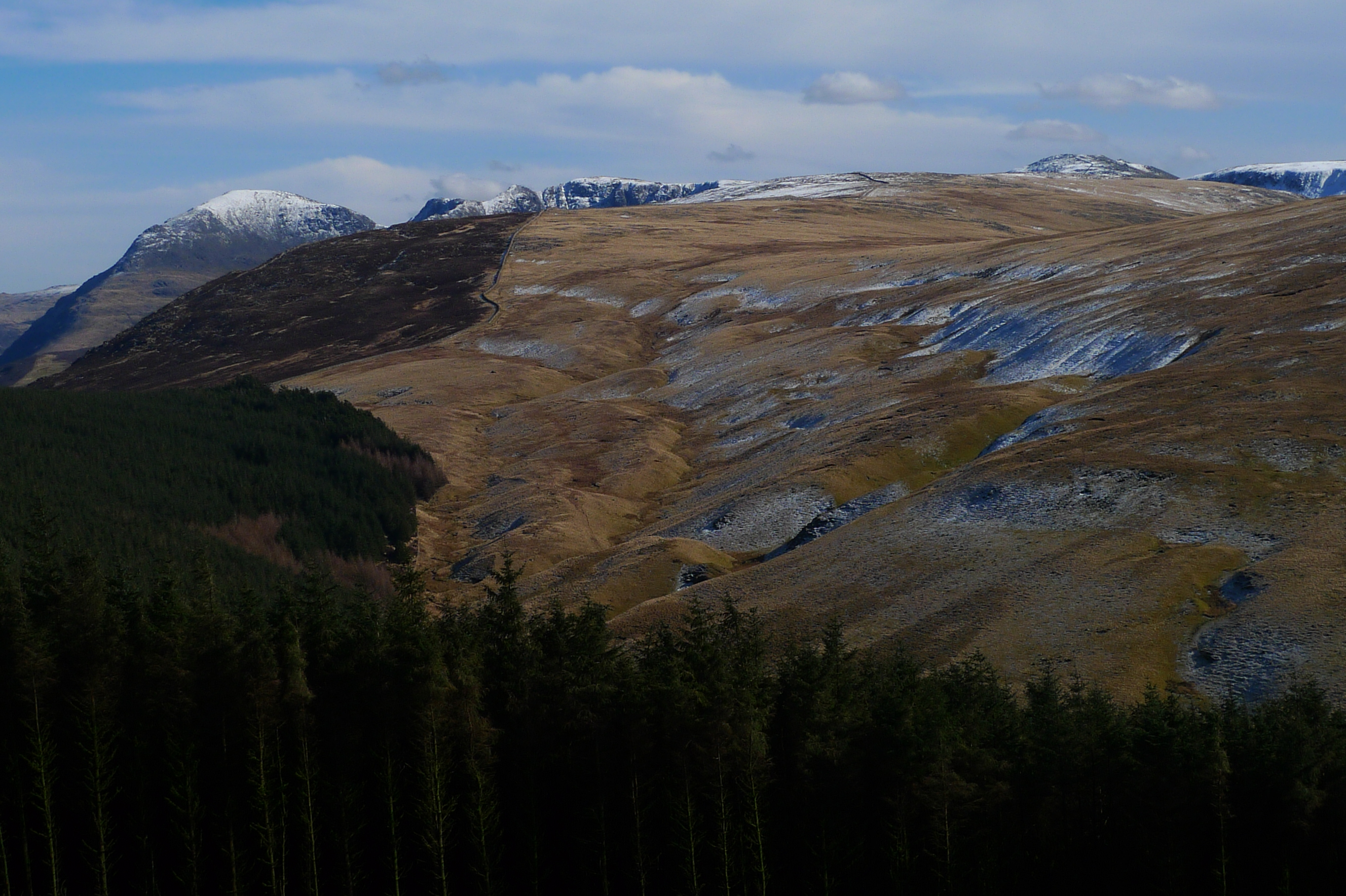
Iron Crag from the Black Potts road

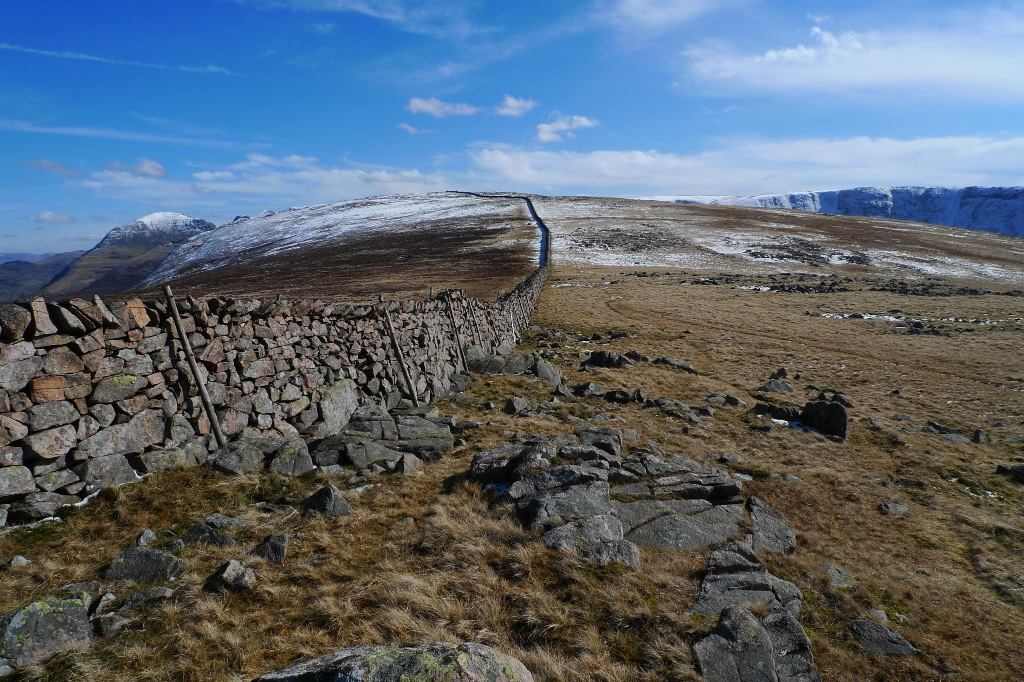
Iron Crag from the West
