= Latterbarrow =

Coordinates: 54°23′02″N 2°58′31″W

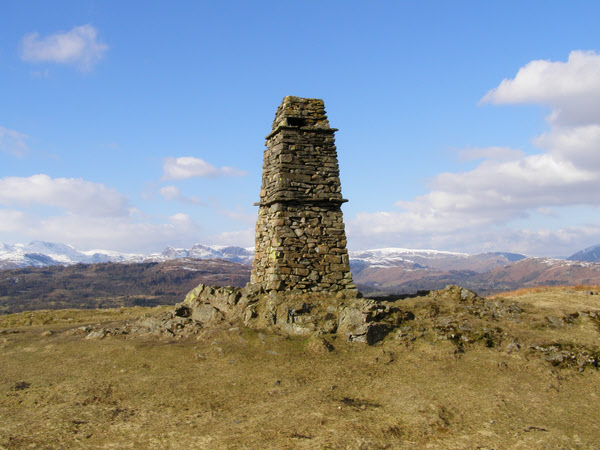
The monument on Latterbarrow

Latterbarrow is a hill in the English Lake District, east of Hawkshead, Cumbria. It is the subject of a chapter of Wainwright's book The Outlying Fells of Lakeland. It reaches 803 feet (245 m) and is surmounted by a monument, but Wainwright, unusually, makes no comment on the monument's age or purpose, merely mentioning this "... elegant obelisk being prominently in view from Hawkshead and the Ambleside district." He recommends an anticlockwise circuit from Colthouse, near Hawkshead, and describes it as "a circular walk needing little effort yet yielding much delight".

The name may indicate a hill where animals had their lair, from Old Norse látr, a lair or sty, and berg, a hill.
