= Cold Fell (Calder Bridge) =

Hill in the English Lake District

Coordinates: 54°28′N 3°27′W

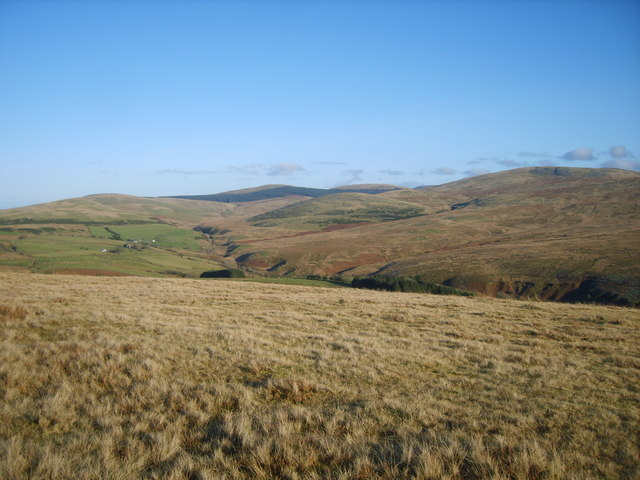
- On Cold Fell, looking towards the River Calder

Highest point
- Elevation: 293 m (961 ft)

Geography
- Location: Cumbria, England
- OS grid: NY058091

Cold Fell is a hill in the west of the English Lake District. It is easily climbed from the road between Ennerdale Bridge and Calder Bridge. This road is in fact known as Cold Fell Road and is used by many Sellafield employees living in Cockermouth.

The fell is grassy and nowhere steep. The summit is very flat but offers a view of the west Cumbrian coastline and Sellafield. Cold Fell is home to a group of horses which roam freely about a number of fells in the area.

Cold Fell is the subject of a chapter of Wainwright's book The Outlying Fells of Lakeland. Unusually he does not specify a route of ascent, saying: "If, with the aid of the map only, you cannot find the top of Cold Fell, then take some good advice, old man, and pack it in." He lists the height as 955 feet (291 m).
