= Watch Hill (Cockermouth) =

Hill in Cumbria, England

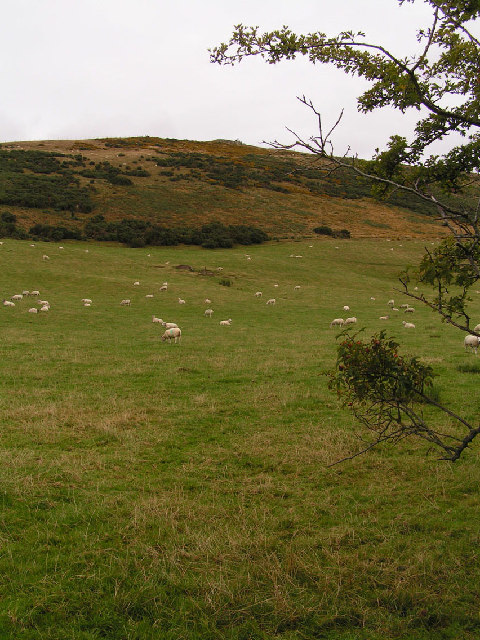
- Watch Hill from the entrance to Greenlands Farm

Highest point
- Elevation: 254 m (833 ft)
- Prominence: 157 m (515 ft)
- Parent peak: Lord's Seat
- Listing: Marilyn, Outlying Wainwright
- Coordinates: 54°40′27″N 3°18′20″W

Geography
- Location within the Lake District Location within the former Allerdale Borough
- Location: Lake District, England
- OS grid: NY159318
- Topo map: OS Landranger 90

Watch Hill is a small hill lying on the north-western fringe of the Lake District in England. It has a height of 833 feet (254 m) and a prominence of 515 feet (157 m). The name Setmurthy Common is sometimes used (including by Alfred Wainwright in his book The Outlying Fells of Lakeland) to refer to the area including the highest point, with "Watch Hill" describing the area to the west of the summit. It should not be confused with another Watch Hill some 19 km to the south-west, near Whitehaven, which is only 172 m (564 ft) high. The name "The Hay" is also used when referring to the area west of the summit.

Despite its low height it is a Marilyn (a hill with topographic prominence of at least 150m) because of the large height separation from its neighbours. This 'detachedness' means that it is an excellent viewpoint. Skiddaw, Blencathra, the Lord's Seat group and Grisedale Pike are all seen, and there is a first-class view of the Cockermouth area and the Solway Coast AONB.

The hill is a popular climb with Cockermouth folk, along with its lower neighbour Slate Fell.

Wainwright recommends an ascent from the west and a return on the same route. He comments that "It is easily attained with a minimum of effort: a stroll on grass so simple that boots are incongruous footwear for it and bare feet appropriate".
