= Stickle =

Stickle may refer to:

- Stickle Tarn, Langdale, a small tarn in the Lake District, England
- Great Stickle, a fell in the Lake District, England
- Stickle Pike, a fell in the Lake District, England
- Pike of Stickle, a fell in the Lake District, England
- Stickle Ridge, on James Ross Island near Antarctica
- Jane Stickle (1817–1896), American artist
- Leon Stickle (born 1948), Canadian ice hockey player
- Beverly Ann Stickle, a character on the American television show The Facts of Life
- George Stickle, a character in the film The Incredible Mr. Limpet
- Bruno Von Stickle, a character in the movie Herbie Goes to Monte Carlo

== See also ==
- Stickle Bricks, a construction toy
- 36986 Stickle, a minor planet named for Angela M. Stickle (born 1984)
- Stickles, a surname
