= Black Fell (Lake District) =

Fell in the Lake District, United Kingdom

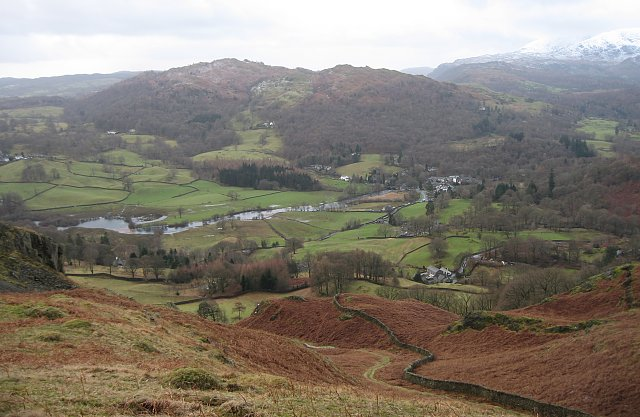
- Black Fell from Loughrigg Fell

Highest point
- Elevation: 323 m (1,060 ft)
- Prominence: 126 m (413 ft)
- Parent peak: Top o'Selside
- Listing: Wainwright
- Coordinates: 54°24′20″N 3°01′00″W

Geography
- Location within the Lake District
- Location: Cumbria, England
- Parent range: Lake District, Southern Fells
- OS grid: NY341016
- Topo map: OS Landranger 89,90, Explorer OL7

Black Fell is a fell in the English Lake District. It rises to the north of Tarn Hows, between Coniston and Hawkshead.

== Topography ==
Black Fell is the high point in the hilly area bounded by Windermere, Langdale and Coniston. It occupies an area of around one mile by two, clad mainly in fell grass with many small outcrops of rock. Despite its modest altitude Alfred Wainwright accorded Black Fell a chapter in his Pictorial Guide to the Lakeland Fells, partly due to its excellence as a view point. It represents the perimeter of the Lakeland Fells proper in his opinion, the land to the south falling within his supplementary volume, The Outlying Fells of Lakeland. Later guidebook writers have also included Black Fell within their remit.

The fell has no obvious connecting ridges in the manner of higher mountains, but in fact has a pivotal position in this area of the district. To the west over Oxen Fell High Cross (518 ft) is Holme Fell and an onward link to Wetherlam and the Furness Fells (Coniston Fells). To the south east a broad highland runs out between Windermere and Esthwaite Water, terminating in Claife Heights. Finally southward runs the 7 mile ridge of Grizedale Forest, capped by Carron Crag and Top o'Selside, Black Fell's topographical parent.

Black Fell's northern boundary is formed by Elter Water and the River Brathay. The broadleaved woodland of Brow Coppice stands above the village of Skelwith Bridge in the valley. Beyond the eastern slopes is a mile of gently falling country, running through plantations to the head of Windermere. There are many tarns within this landscape, most of them artificial. The largest are Blelham Tarn and the pools near the Drunken Duck (Inn) crossroads. On the western side is the A593 road from Coniston to Ambleside, crossing the minor pass of Oxen Fell.

South-west of Black Fell is Tarn Hows, a picturesque work of landscape design initiated by James Marshall in the 1860s. This is one of the most popular destinations in the Lake District, the mixture of water, rock and arboretum being finely contrived. Now owned by the National Trust, the motor traffic is so great that a one-way system had to be initiated as early as the 1960s. Tarn Hows is maintained by a dam at the south west corner and circumnavigated by a broad, level path, providing access to all. Few of the millions of visitors stray onto the slopes of Black Fell, or even know the name of the hill which provides the backdrop to so many photographs.

The whole fell was once owned by the Marshall family of Monk Coniston, before passing via a Mrs Heelis (better known as Beatrix Potter) to the National Trust, by whom it is held in perpetuity for the nation.

Although the lower slopes are wooded (except in the west), the top of the fell is open to the sky. In addition to the summit outcrop, somewhat optimistically titled Black Crag on maps, there are other tops at Great Cobble and Stephen How to the north, and Arnside and Torver Intakes to the south. A further feature on the southern flank of the fell is Iron Keld Plantation, through which the main access path to the summit climbs. There are some steeper areas, particularly at Pull Scar on the eastern side.

== Geology ==
The fell is composed of the dacitic lapilli tuff of the Lincomb Tarns Formation. Immediately to the east is the Brathay Fault, beyond which are sedimentary rocks of the Windermere Group.

== Summit ==
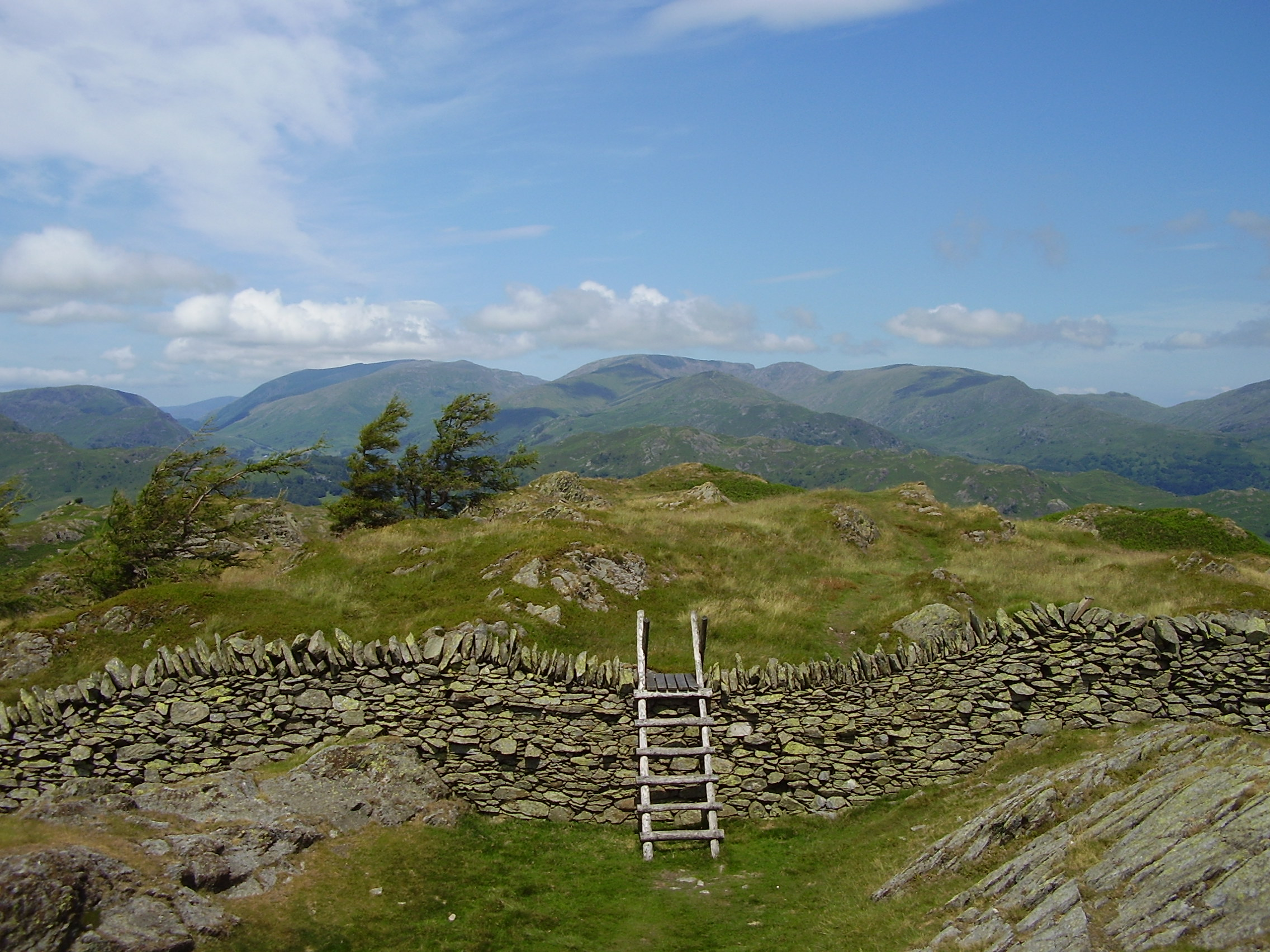
View north from Black Fell summit

A bridleway runs across the fell from the summit of the A593 in the west to Knipe Fold in the east, locally known as the "mountain road". A further footpath branches off northward to the vicinity of Skelwith Bridge, providing the best access to the summit. This bears an Ordnance Survey triangulation column complete with a National Trust sign. 200 yards to the east a prominent cairn marks the best viewpoint for Windermere, whilst northerly views can be improved by the short march to Great Cobble. The panorama takes in both the high Coniston and Langdale Fells, and the lowlands and lakes to the south and west, a fine distillation of what Cumbria has to offer.

== Ascents ==
All ascents end via the short walk from the bridleway at Iron Keld to the summit, but starts can be made at Skelwith Bridge, High Park, Oxen Fell, Yew Tree Tarn, Tom Gill, Tarn Hows or Knipe Fold.
