= Staveley Fell =

Hill in Cumbria, England

Coordinates: 54°16′25″N 2°56′21″W

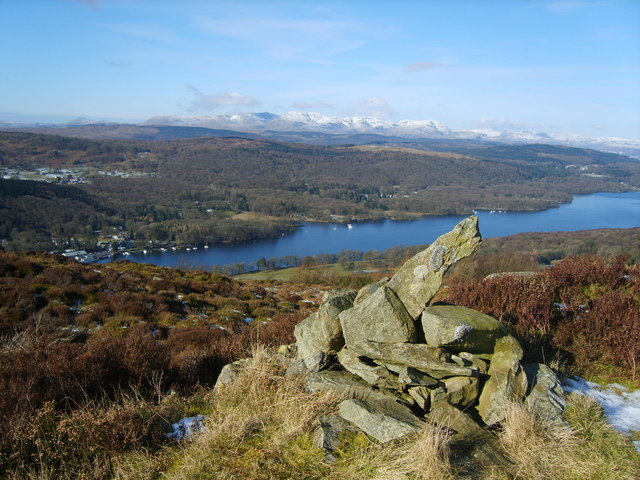
Cairn on Staveley Fell with view of Windermere

Staveley Fell is an upland area in the English Lake District, near (and named for) Staveley-in-Cartmel (not to be confused with Staveley-in-Westmorland), Cumbria, east of the southern end of Windermere. It is the subject of a chapter of Wainwright's book The Outlying Fells of Lakeland, but he admits that: "Strictly it has no name, not even locally, being referred to on Ordnance maps as Astley's and Chapel House Plantations, which are new forests severely encroaching upon it". He says it "commands a fine aerial view of the foot of Windermere." The fell reaches 870 feet (270 m) and Wainwright's route is a clockwise loop starting from Staveley-in-Cartmel. Chris Jesty in his revised edition of Wainwright's book provides an alternative route and comments that "There must be many people who, encouraged by the ordnance Survey map, or by the first edition of this book, have ... been turned back by an uncrossable fence."
