= Wet Sleddale Reservoir =

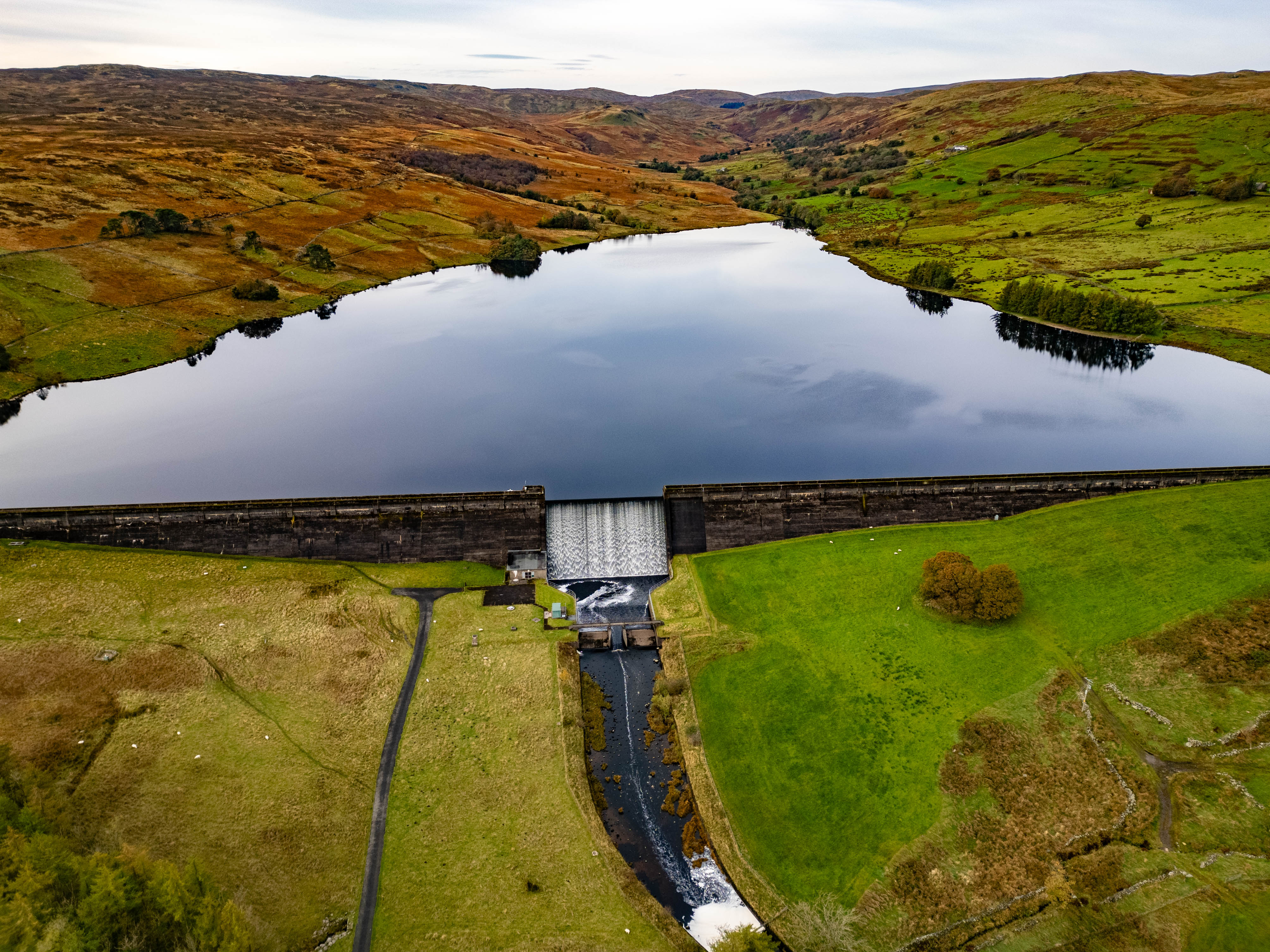
- Wet Sleddale Reservoir and Dam

- Location in the Lake District National Park Location in Eden, Cumbria
- Location: Shap, Cumbria
- Coordinates: 54°29′47″N 2°41′44″W
- Type: reservoir
- Catchment area: 12.14 km^{2} (1,214 ha)
- Basin countries: United Kingdom
- Surface area: 30.7 ha (76 acres)

Wet Sleddale Reservoir is an artificial reservoir set amongst the Shap Fells 4 kilometres (2 mi) south of the village of Shap in Cumbria, England, and lies just within the boundary of the Lake District National Park. The triangular shaped reservoir, which can store 2,330,406,000 litres (512,618,000 imp gal; 615,628,000 US gal) of water, was created by the construction of a dam across Sleddale Beck in order to supply Manchester with water. The dam is 21 metres (69 ft) high and 600 metres (2,000 ft) long.

The extracted water is carried to Haweswater, mainly through tunnels.

The beck emerges from the foot of the dam as the River Lowther. There is a public car park beneath the dam from which a public right of way gives access to the south side of the reservoir. Alfred Wainwright describes a walk from here in the Wet Sleddale Horseshoe chapter of his The Outlying Fells of Lakeland.

Manchester Corporation were given powers to construct the reservoir under the Haweswater Act, 1919 but construction did not start until the 1960s and completion was in 1966.
