= Holme Fell =

Fell in Cumbria, England

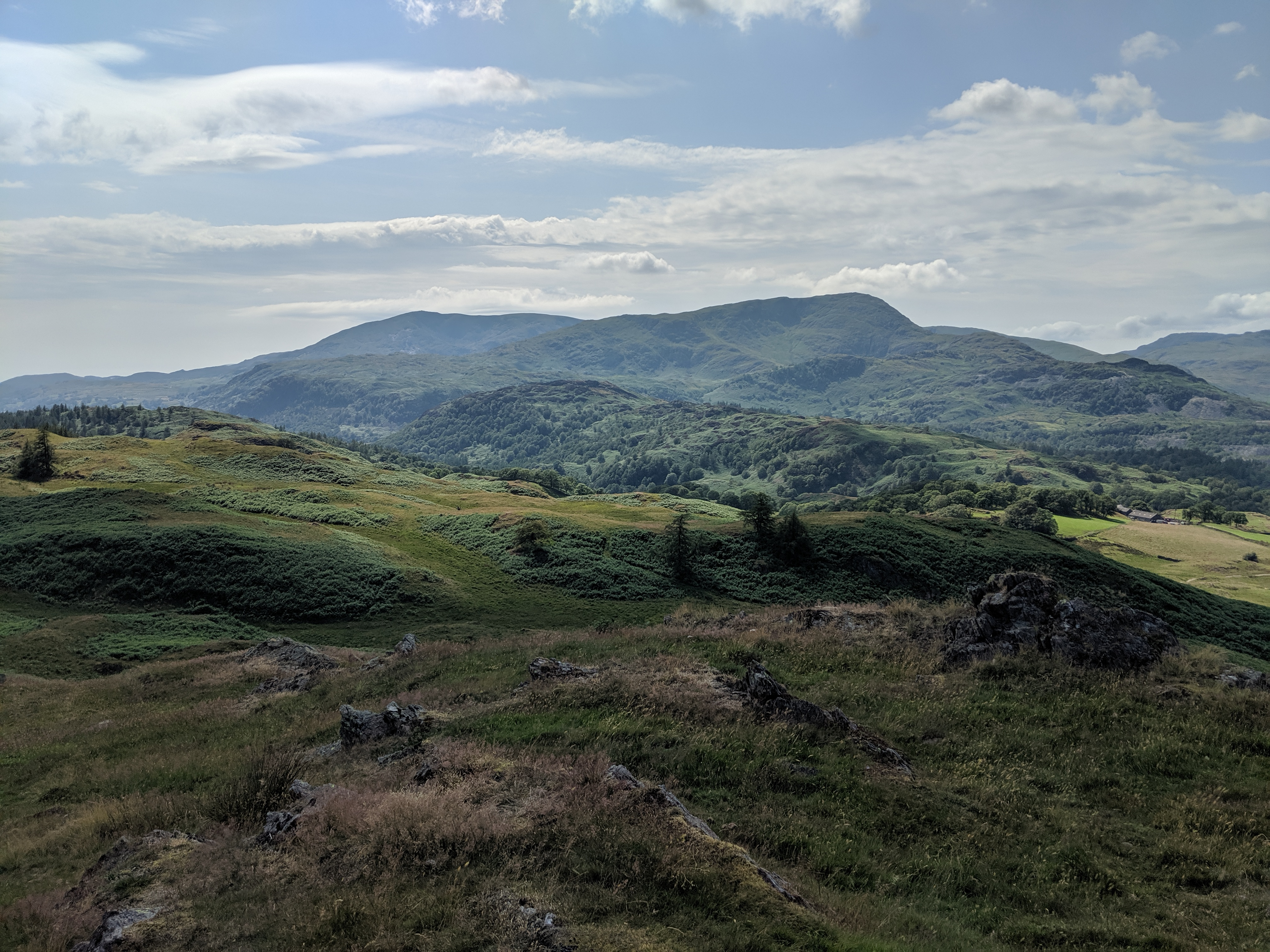
- Holme Fell from Black Fell with the Coniston Fells behind

Highest point
- Elevation: 317 m (1,040 ft)
- Prominence: 165 m (541 ft)
- Parent peak: Old Man of Coniston
- Listing: Marilyn, Wainwright
- Coordinates: 54°23′46″N 3°03′22″W

Geography
- Location within the Lake District
- Location: Cumbria, England
- Parent range: Lake District, Southern Fells
- OS grid: NY315006
- Topo map: OS Landranger 90, Explorer OL7

Holme Fell or Holm Fell is a fell in the Lake District in Cumbria, England. It is located between Coniston Water and Little Langdale, almost isolated from the neighbouring Coniston Fells by Yewdale Beck.

== Topography ==
Holme Fell is an eastern outlier of Wetherlam, although the topographical connection via Great Intake and Low Tilberthwaite is rather tortuous. Further east, beyond Oxen Fell High Cross, the high ground continues to Black Fell.

The fell itself is a ridge running broadly north-south and about a mile and a half long. The summit is at the southern extremity, a flank guarded by Calf and Raven Crags. Immediately to the north is Ivy Crag, a second top sporting a large cairn, followed by the depression of Uskdale Gap. Continuing northward are a succession of lower tops, gradually descending toward the final knoll of Great How (692 ft). A swift descent to the floor of Little Langdale then follows.

The boundaries of the fell are all formed by roads and tracks, giving opportunities for circular walks. The main Ambleside-Coniston road lies to the east and the minor road along Little Langdale to the north. Yewdale Beck runs around the southern perimeter, with the narrow access lane to Hodge Close hugging its bank. From Hodge Close a bridleway runs north to Little Langdale. The southern half of the fell has much natural woodland, mostly deciduous species. There are also some larger artificial plantings to the north.

Hodge Close bears the remains of quarrying (see below), as does Uskdale Gap. To the west of the Gap are two small tarns. These were built as reservoirs for the quarry, with the water used to operate a funicular to raise slate to ground level.

A further artificial water body is Yew Tree Tarn beside the Ambleside-Coniston road. This was dammed to a depth of 10 ft (3 metres) in the 1930s by James Marshall, the landowner. The original intent was to provide fishing, and trout are still plentiful today.

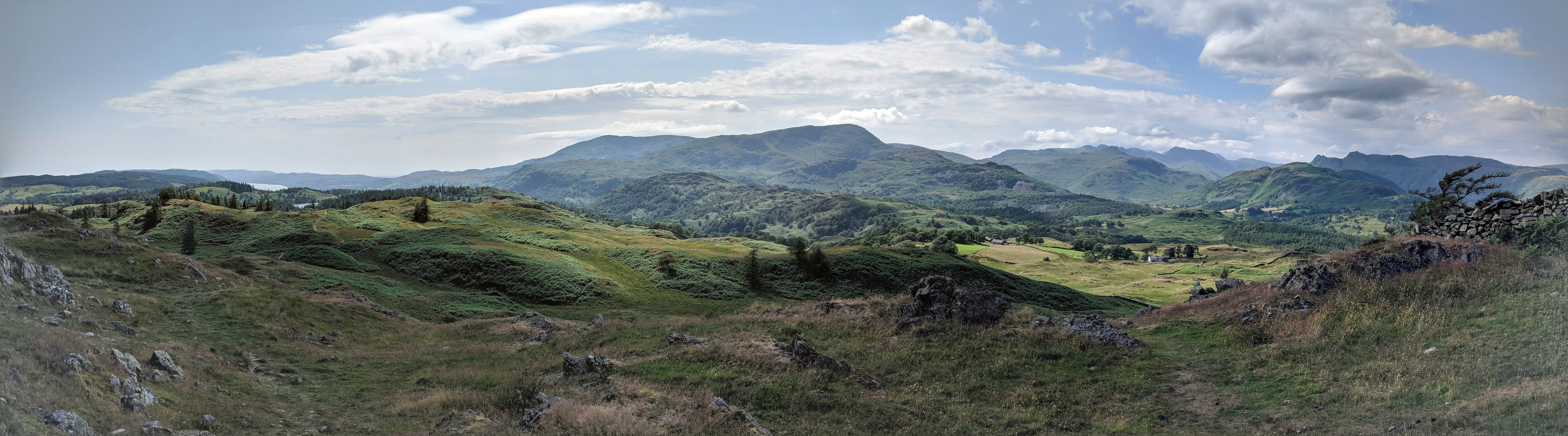
Panorama of Holme Fell with the Coniston and Langdale fells (notably Crinkle Crags, Bowfell, Harrison Stickle and Pavey Ark) in the distance

== Geology ==
The summit ridge is formed from the dacitic lapilli tuff of the Lincomb Tarns Formation. Further to the north west are outcrops of the volcaniclastic sandstones of the Seathwaite Fell Formation with sills of basaltic andesite.

== Ascents ==
The fell can be climbed by a number of routes, notably those starting at Holme Ground, Hodge Close quarry, Yew Tree Tarn and Yew Tree Farm, the last two easily extended back to the popular Tarn Hows.

== Summit ==
Despite its modest altitude, the hill's relative isolation means it commands good views to north, south and east, including almost the full length of Coniston Water, with Wetherlam and the rest of the Coniston fells blocking distant views in the south-western quadrant.

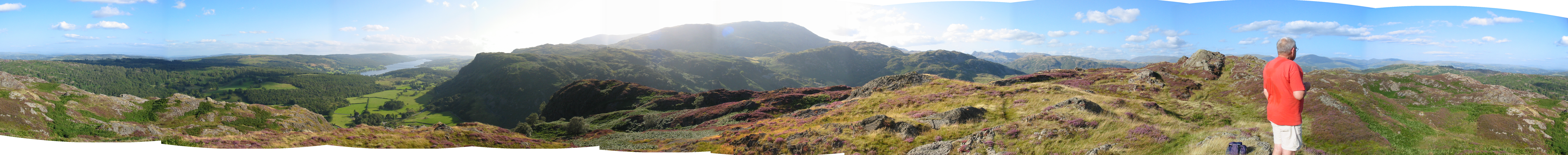
A panorama from the summit of Holme Fell, August 2005

== Name dispute ==
The Ordnance Survey Explorer 1:25,000 map shows it as Holme Fell, but their Landranger 1:50,000 map has it as Holm Fell, albeit with Holme Ground to the north-west. The Ordnance Survey's Gazetteer records only Holme Fell — as the gazetteer is based on locations on the Landranger maps, this suggests that the spelling Holm Fell on that map may be an error. The spelling Holme Fell is used by Alfred Wainwright in his book The Southern Fells but Holm Fell by Alan Dawson in his book The Relative Hills of Britain.

Whichever way it is spelt, the word holm(e) is believed to derive from an Old Norse root referring to a dry place within a marshy area.

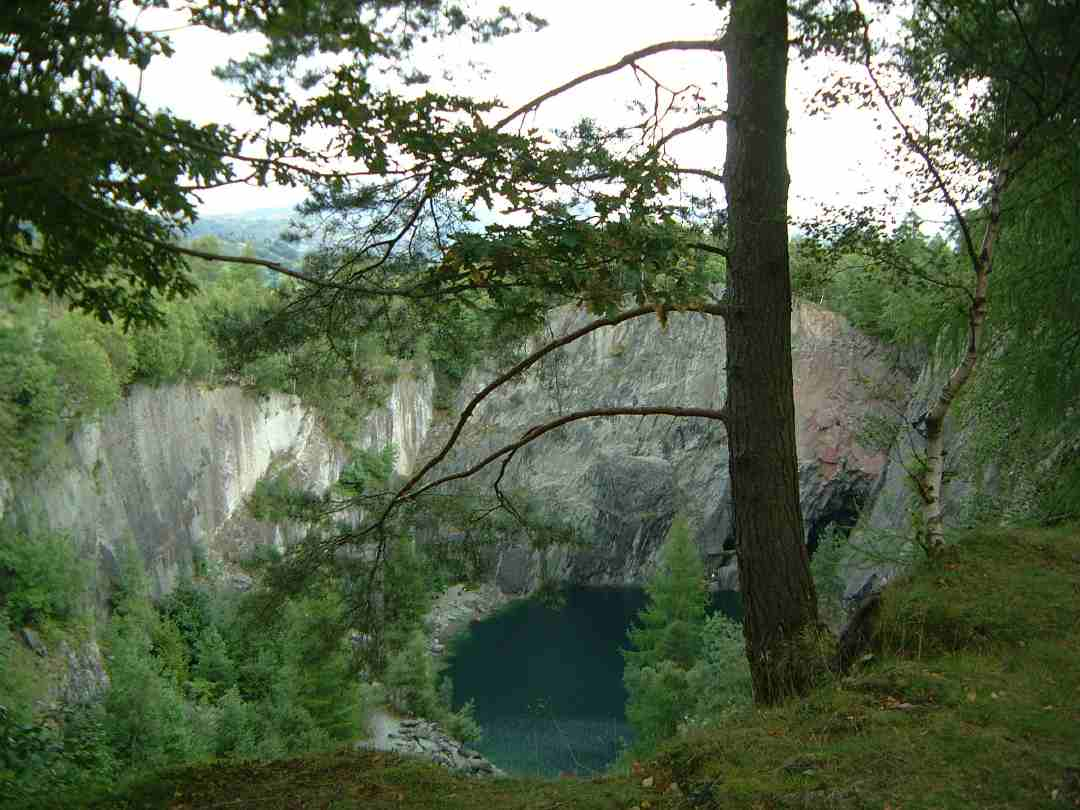
Looking down into Hodge Close Quarry.

== Hodge Close Quarry ==
The slopes of Holme Fell include the massive disused green slate quarry at Hodge Close, located at NY317017. The quarry closed just before the start of the Second World War. It has flooded chambers and tunnels which are used by cave divers for sport, but it is a dangerous location and several divers have died over the years, after becoming lost in the murky waters of the tunnels. The quarry is also used by rock climbers and offers some excellent Extreme routes such as ‘First Night Nerves’ and ‘Wicked Willie’.
