= Jesty =

Jesty is a surname. Notable people with the surname include:

- Benjamin Jesty (1736–1816), farmer who experimented with cowpox to immunise against smallpox
- Chris Jesty (born 1942/43), British writer and cartographer
- Trevor Jesty (born 1948), cricketer
- Thomas Jesty (born 1991), chorister
