= Black Crag =

Black Crag may refer to:

- A subsidiary top of Scoat Fell, Mosedale, Cumbria, England
- A southern part of Red Pike, Wasdale, Cumbria, England
- A subsidiary top of Rossett Pike, Langdale, Cumbria, England
- A summit of Hugill Fell, above Staveley, Cumbria, England
- Black Crag (Antarctica) the eastern extremity of Noville Peninsula, Antarctica

== Note ==
Newsome in her A Companion to Wainwright's Pictorial Guides to the Lakeland Fells identifies 16 distinct Black Crags mentioned by Wainwright, while Ordnance Survey mapping shows 5 including another in Northumberland, a mile west of the Pennine Way in the civil parish of Tarset. The Database of British and Irish Hills lists only the Mosedale, Langdale and Wasdale summits shown above.
