= Lord's Seat (disambiguation) =

Lord's Seat is a mountain in the north west of the English Lake District.

Lord's Seat may also refer to:

- Lord's Seat (Peak District), a summit on Rushup Edge, Derbyshire, England
- Lord's Seat (Crookdale), a summit in the east of the English Lake District
- Lord's Seat (Whitbarrow), the summit of Whitbarrow in the south of the English Lake District
