= Hugill Fell =

Hill in Cumbria, England

Coordinates: 54°23′16″N 2°49′45″W

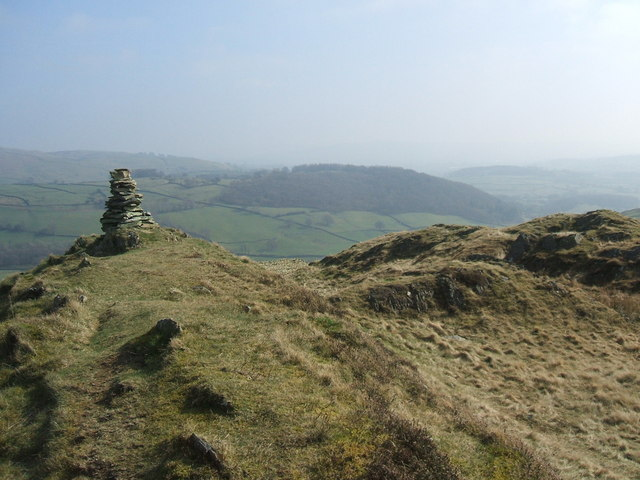
Cairn on Hugill Fell

Hugill Fell is a hill in the English Lake District, near Staveley, Cumbria, on the western side of the Kentmere valley.

The Database of British and Irish Hills identifies two summits: "Hugill Fell" with a height of 896 feet (273 m), classified as a TuMP, and "Hugill Fell (Wainwright Summit)" at 869 feet (265 m). Wainwright's summit is also known as Black Crag.

It is the subject of a chapter of Wainwright's book The Outlying Fells of Lakeland. Wainwright's walk is an ascent from Staveley and return on the same route. He states that there is a cairn on the summit.

Wainwright, writing in 1974, says that there is no access from Hugill Fell to the nearby summits of Reston Scar and High Knott because of "high and collapsable drystone walls", adding "Finding a legitimate way amongst the network of walls is like trying to solve a bent-nail puzzle, except that in this case there is positively no solution", but Chris Jesty in the 2011 second edition of Wainwright's book, says: "Can a traverse be made to the nearby summit of Reston Scar? These days the answer is YES: gates have been provided in the high drystone walls and a clear path links the two summits." He recommends a circular walk ascending to Hugill Fell and descending from Reston Scar.
