= Caw (hill) =

Hill in Cumbria, England

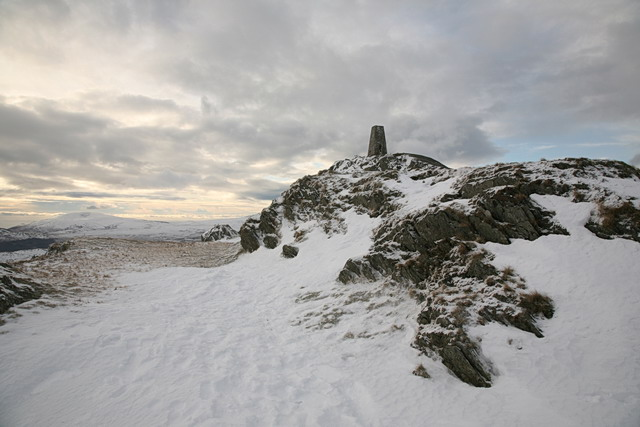
- Summit trig point, with Black Combe on left horizon

Highest point
- Elevation: 529 m (1,736 ft)
- Prominence: 132 m (433 ft)
- Parent peak: Old Man of Coniston
- Listing: Wainwright Outlying Fell, HuMP, Dodd, Dewey, Birkett, Synge, Fellranger, Clem
- Coordinates: 54°20′19″N 3°11′10″W

Geography
- Location within the Lake District
- Location: Lake District, England
- OS grid: SD 230945
- Topo map: OS Explorer 96

Caw is a hill in Cumbria, England, near the village of Seathwaite above the Duddon Valley, reaching 1,735 feet (529 m) and having a trig point at the summit (OS grid SD231945). It is the subject of a chapter of Wainwright's book The Outlying Fells of Lakeland. His anticlockwise route from Seathwaite returns over Pikes at 1,520 feet (460 m) and Green Pikes at 1,350 feet (410 m).

Caw is a Fellranger, being included in Mark Richards' The Old Man of Coniston, Swirl How, Wetherlam and the South as one of the 18 (now 21) of his 227 (230 with the extension of the national park) summits which are not in Alfred Wainwright's list of 214. Richards describes it as "A great stand-alone fell with plenty to offer the explorer". It is also classified as a Birkett, Clem, Dewey, Dodd, HuMP and Synge.
