= Blawith Knott =

Mountain in the English Lake District, Cumbria, England

Coordinates: 54°17′11″N 3°08′15″W

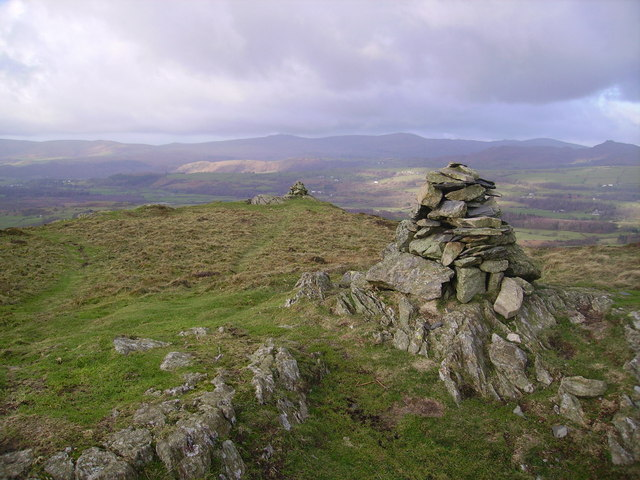
Cairns on the summit of Blawith Knott

Blawith Knott is a hill in the south of the English Lake District, near Woodland, Cumbria. It is the subject of a chapter of Wainwright's book The Outlying Fells of Lakeland. It reaches 806 feet (246 m) and Wainwright's clockwise route from the fell road to the south-west also includes Tottlebank Height at 775 feet (236 m). He describes Blawith Knott as "a magnificent viewpoint", with both a panorama of Lake District fells to the north and, to the east to south, views which, on a clear day, include the Howgill Fells, Whernside and Ingleborough.
