= Wet Sleddale Horseshoe =

Coordinates: 54°29′46″N 2°41′11″W

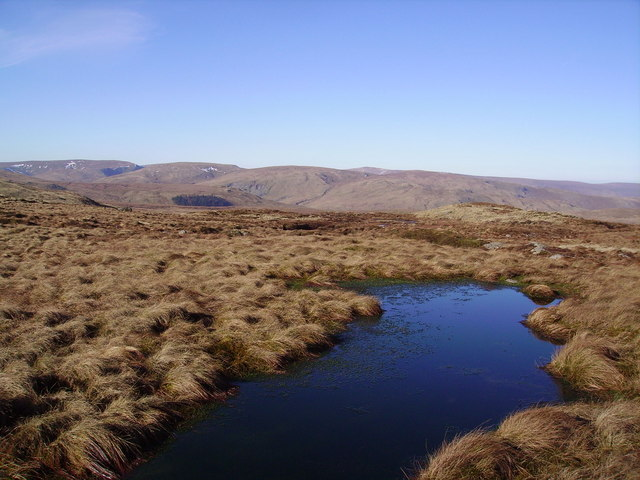
Tarn on Great Saddle Crag

The Wet Sleddale Horseshoe is an upland area in the English Lake District, around the Wet Sleddale Reservoir, Cumbria. It is the subject of a chapter of Wainwright's book The Outlying Fells of Lakeland. His walk starts at the reservoir dam and follows a clockwise circuit over Sleddale Pike at 1,659 feet (506 m), Great Saddle Crag at 1,850 feet (560 m) and Ulthwaite Rigg at 1,648 feet (502 m). All three peaks are within the Shap Fells Site of Special Scientific Interest.
