= Caer Mote =

Hill in Cumbria, England

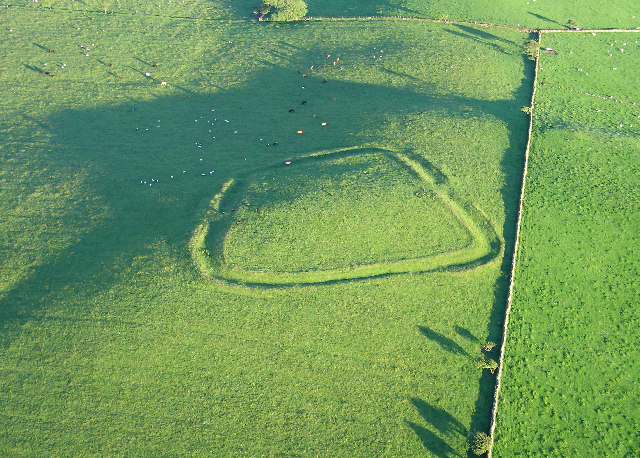
- "The Battery", earthwork on Caer Mote

Highest point
- Elevation: 289 m (948 ft)
- Prominence: 59 m (194 ft)
- Coordinates: 54.7272°N 3.2497°W

Geography
- Location: Cumbria, England
- OS grid: NY196376

Caer Mote is a hill of 289 metres (948 ft) in the north of the English Lake District near Bothel, Cumbria. Its summit lies just outside the boundary of the Lake District National Park and offers a view of Bassenthwaite Lake. Under the name Caermote Hill it is the subject of a chapter of Wainwright's book The Outlying Fells of Lakeland. Wainwright's route is an ascent from Bothel to the northern summit St. John's Hill at 285 metres (935 ft), continuing south to the main summit and south east to meet a minor road beside the Roman fort and follow that road north for an anticlockwise circuit. In his original book Wainwright lists the height as 920 feet (280 m), but in the 2011 2nd edition Chris Jesty corrects this to 948 feet.

There is an ancient earthwork enclosure of undetermined age, known as "The Battery" on the northern summit, St. John's Hill. There are traces of a 1st-century AD Roman fort below the hill, to the south east.

Caermote Hill is listed by the Database of British and Irish Hills as a TuMP, and St John's Hill is given the subtitle "Caermote Hill N Top"; both summits are recognised as "Wainwright Outlying Fells".
