= Seat Robert =

Hill in the Lake District, England

Coordinates: 54°29′49″N 2°44′13″W

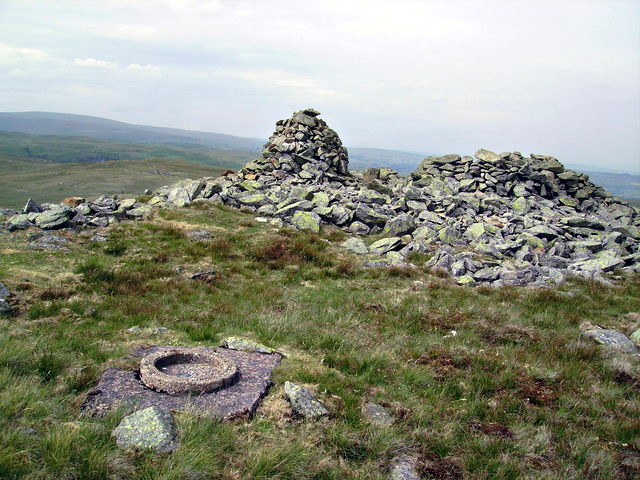
Cairn and Ordnance Survey ring on Seat Robert

Seat Robert is a hill in the east of the English Lake District, south west of Shap, Cumbria. It is the subject of a chapter of Wainwright's book The Outlying Fells of Lakeland. It reaches 1,688 feet (515 m), and has a cairn and an Ordnance Survey "ring" at ground level rather than the usual trig point column. Wainwright's route is a clockwise circuit from Swindale reaching Seat Robert by way of Langhowe Pike at 1,313 feet (400 m) and Great Ladstones at 1,439 feet (439 m), and continuing over High Wether Howe at 1,705 feet (520 m) and Fewling Stones and 1,667 feet (508 m). The first section of his route follows the Old Corpse Road, a corpse road, along which corpses were carried from Mardale to be buried at Shap.
