= Potter Fell =

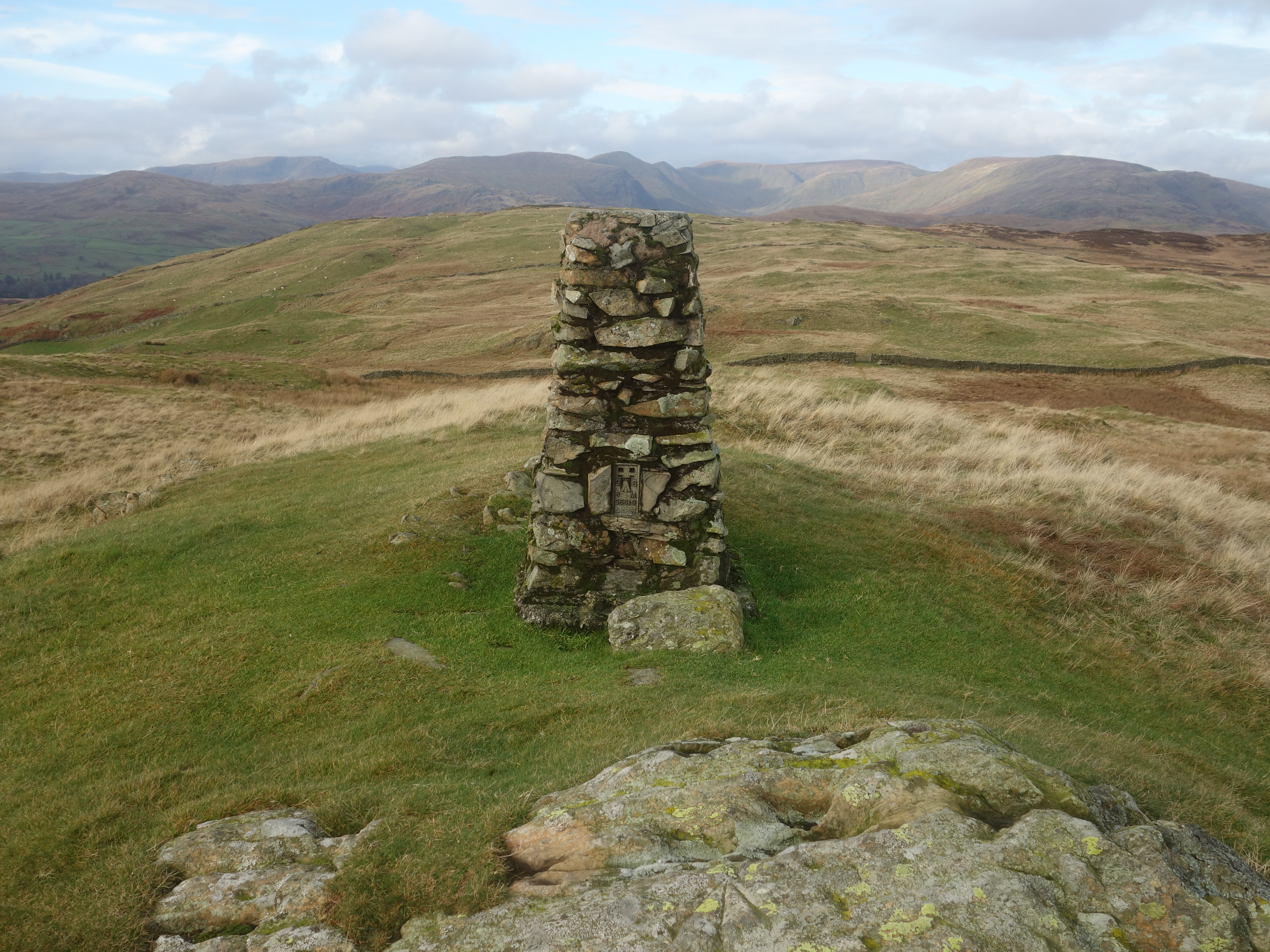
- The cairn on the summit of Brunt Knott

Highest point
- Elevation: 427 m (1,401 ft)
- Coordinates: 54°23′54″N 2°47′46″W

Geography
- Location within the Lake District
- Location: Cumbria, England

Potter Fell is a fell near the villages of Burneside and Staveley, Cumbria, England, reaching a maximum height of 1,400 feet (430 m) at Brunt Knott. Alfred Wainwright in his The Outlying Fells of Lakeland identifies four summits on Potter Fell: Brunt Knott, Ulgraves and two unnamed summits, all of which are thus recognised by the Database of British and Irish Hills. There are a number of tarns on the fell, including Gurnal Dubs and Potter Tarn.

== Summits ==
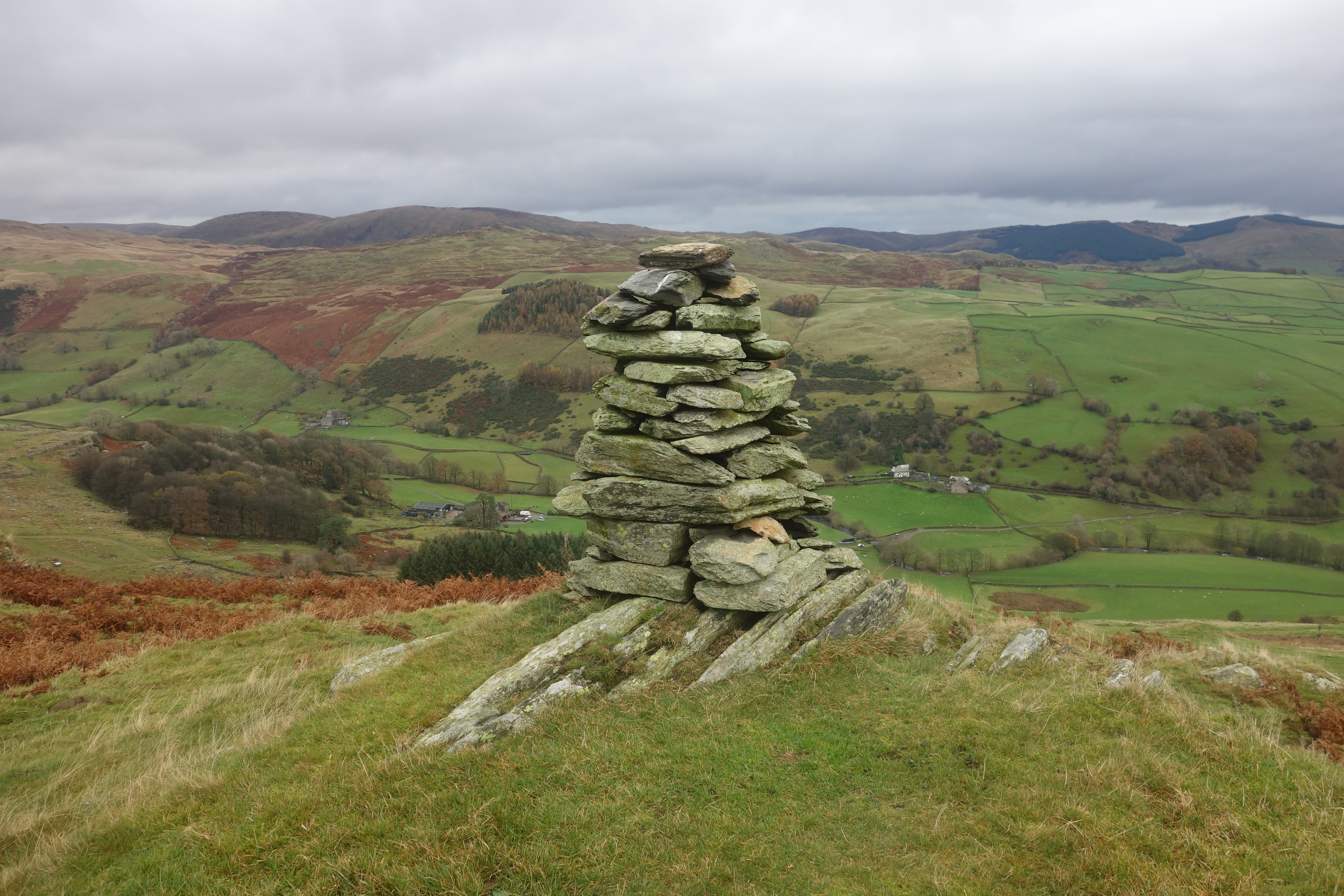
The cairn on the summit of Ulgraves

Potter Fell is made up of four separate peaks (as identified by Wainwright), two of which are unnamed. The first unnamed summit (395 m / 1,296 ft) lies between Potter Tarn and Brunt Knott. Further north from the first unnamed summit is Brunt Knott (427 m / 1,401 ft), marked by a stone triangulation station at its highest point. Between these first two summits is a small pool of water with a wall running through it, which Wainwright named "wall through a pool". East of these two summits is another unnamed one (390 m / 1,280 ft). Further east is the fourth summit, Ulgraves (332 m / 1,089 ft); like Brunt Knott, the highest point is marked by a trig point. The summit of Ulgraves looks over the Longsleddale valley.

Wainwright's 7.5-mile (12.1 km) clockwise route starts on the road between Bowston and Staveley and passes the four summits, two named and two nameless, as described above, with a total of 1,700 feet (520 m) of ascent. Brunt Knott can also be ascended from Staveley.

== Tarns ==
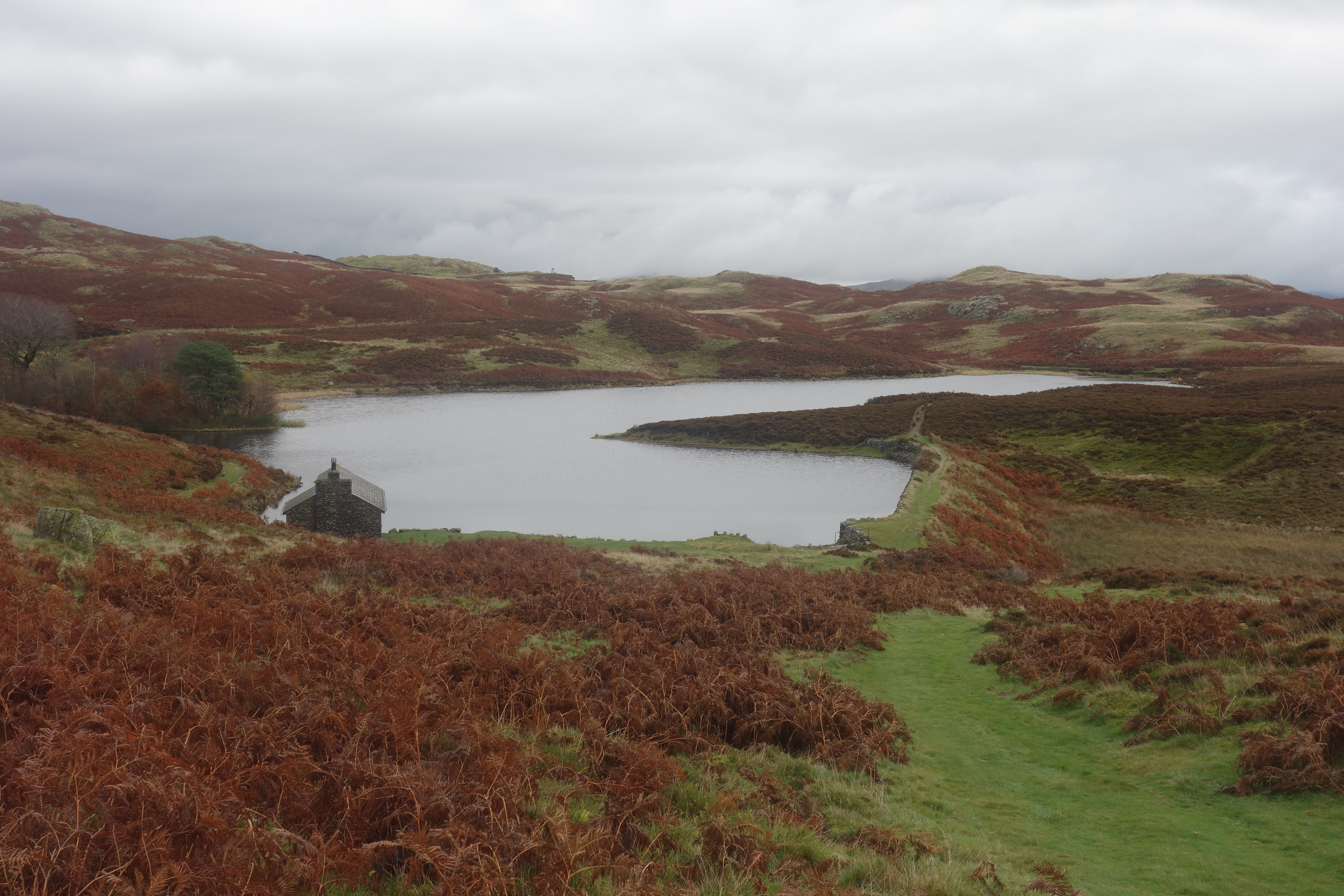
Gurnal Dubs, with the boathouse on the near left

There are a number of tarns on Potter Fell, of which Gurnal Dubs and Potter Tarn are the most significant. Potter Tarn is located at the bottom of the ascent to the unnamed summit (395 m). The tarn supplies water to Croppers Paper Mill in Burneside and its flow is moderated by a concrete dam. The present water level is around half of its 1990 level, when the dam was lowered. The outflow from Potter Tarn issues into Ghyll Pool before the stream descends towards the paper mill. Gurnal Dubs is a popular place for recreational fishing and the licences are managed by the Kent Angling Association. It is located to the west of Ulgraves and south of the unnamed summit (395 m). The tarn is home to a boathouse that was renovated in 1985.
