= Bannisdale Horseshoe =

Upland area in Cumbria, England

Coordinates: 54°24′38″N 2°43′27″W

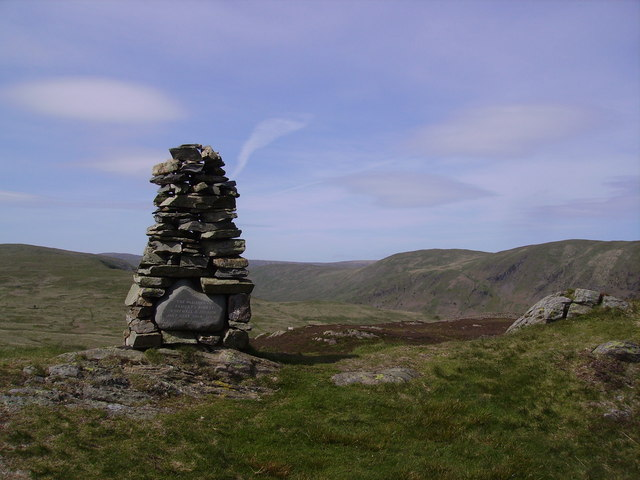
Cairn on Whiteside Pike

The Bannisdale Horseshoe is an upland area in Cumbria, England, near the eastern boundary of the Lake District National Park, surrounding the valley of Bannisdale Beck, a tributary of the River Mint. It is described in the final chapter of Wainwright's book The Outlying Fells of Lakeland.

Wainwright's clockwise walk visits Whiteside Pike at 1,302 feet (397 m), Todd Fell at 1,313 feet (400 m), Capplebarrow at 1,683 feet (513 m), a nameless summit at 1,819 feet (554 m) (identified in the Database of British and Irish Hills (DoBIH) as Swinklebank Crag), a further nameless summit at 1,771 feet (540 m) (identified in DoBIH as Ancrow Brow North), Long Crag at 1,602 feet (488 m), White Howe at 1,737 feet (529 m), a further nameless summit at 1,736 feet (529 m) (identified in DoBIH as The Forest) and Lamb Pasture at 1,205 feet (367 m). Wainwright describes Whiteside Pike as "a dark pyramid of heather and bracken and outcrops of rock: much the most attractive part of the horseshoe and worth a visit even if one goes no further."
