= Burney (hill) =

Hill in Cumbria, England

Coordinates: 54°15′48″N 3°08′30″W

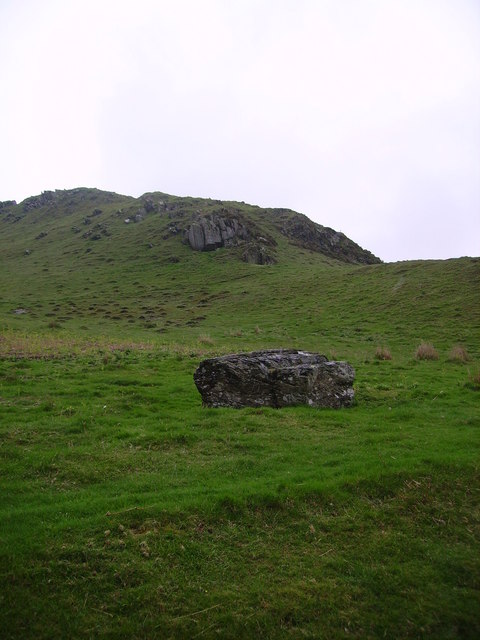
View from the south west

Burney is a hill in Cumbria, England, to the north of the A5092 road between Greenodd and Broughton-in-Furness. It is the subject of a chapter of Wainwright's book The Outlying Fells of Lakeland. It reaches 979 feet (298 m) and has a trig point at the summit. It is also known as Great Burney, and a slight rise on the north ridge is named Little Burney.
