= Woodland Fell =

Upland area in Cumbria, England

Coordinates: 54°17′50″N 3°07′10″W

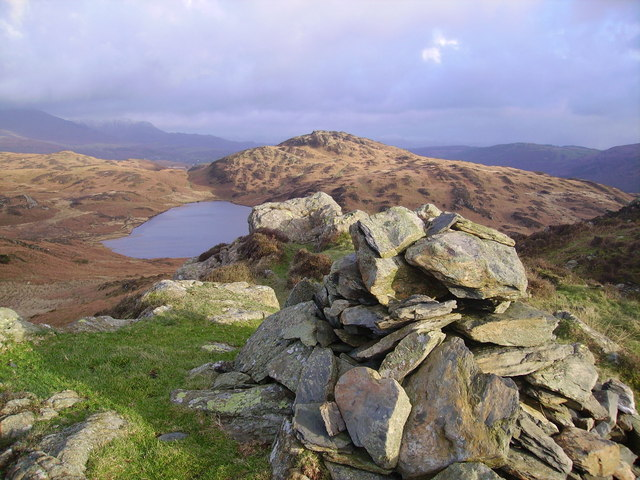
Summit cairn of Wool Knott, with view of Beacon Tarn

Woodland Fell is an upland area in the south of the English Lake District, south of Torver, Cumbria. It is the subject of a chapter of Wainwright's book The Outlying Fells of Lakeland. Wainwright's route is a clockwise circuit from the hamlet of Woodland, and includes the summits of Yew Bank at 678 feet (207 m) and Wool Knott at 730 feet (220 m), with Beacon Tarn (also visited on his Beacon Fell walk) between them. He describes the walk as: "a connoisseur's piece, every step an uninhibited joy, every corner a delight."
