= Humphrey Head =

Headland in Cumbria, England

Coordinates: 54.157°N 2.933°W

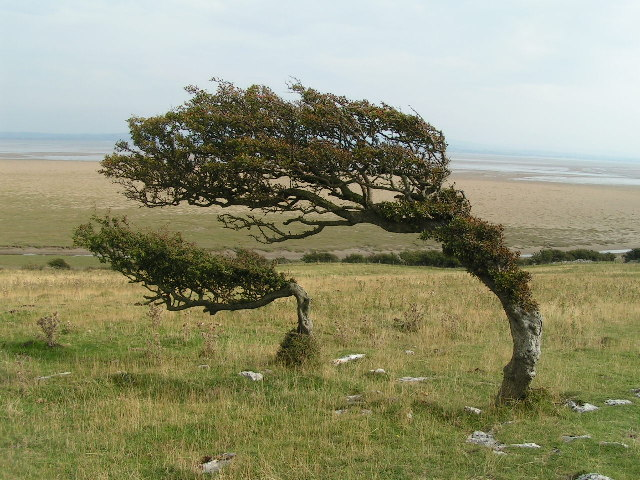
Windblown hawthorn trees, Humphrey Head

Humphrey Head is a limestone outcrop south of the village of Allithwaite in Cumbria, England. It is whale-back-shaped and accessible for walkers, giving views over Morecambe Bay to Lancaster, Morecambe, Heysham and over the Leven estuary to Ulverston. There is an Ordnance Survey trig point at the top.

Since 1906 it has been the home of Humphrey Head Outdoor Centre, currently operated by Mere Mountains. Most of the Head is a nature reserve, managed by Cumbria Wildlife Trust since 1992 although still owned by the Holker Estate. On the eastern flank is a wood with permitted rights of way. It used to be possible to walk on the sands west of Humphrey Head to the end of the outcrop, but changes in the sands have rendered this difficult without waterproof footwear (2011). To the east of Humphrey Head is a marsh forming part of Kents Bank.

Humphrey Head is the traditional location for the killing of the last wolf in England, in about 1390. Folklore has it that the wolf descended the fells from near Coniston where it had caused havoc among the sheep flocks. After it attacked a child in Cark the country-folk chased it to the end of Humphrey Head where it was killed with pikes while hiding among the rocks.

Below Humphrey Head there used to be a house with a spring. The water was reputed to have therapeutic properties. Miners from Durham used to walk here just to take the water. All that is now left is a rusting lead pipe and a clear trickle of water.

On the rock face lies a memorial to William Pedder who died in August 1857. It reads:

Beware how you these Rocks ascend
Here WILLIAM PEDDER met his end
August 22nd 1857 Aged 10 years.
By permission

Humphrey Head is the subject of a chapter of Wainwright's book The Outlying Fells of Lakeland, although he says "Not by any exercise of the imagination can Humphrey Head be classed as an outlying fell of Lakeland" as although it is "outlying", the summit is 172 feet (52 m) and "a fell it is certainly not". He describes a walk from Kents Bank railway station.

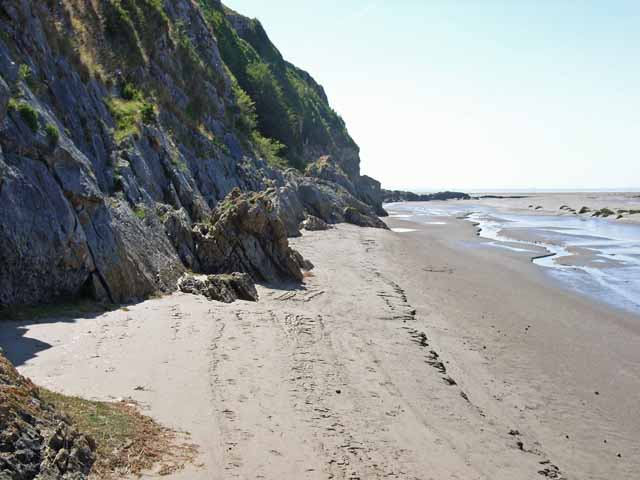
Humphrey Head beach below the cliffs

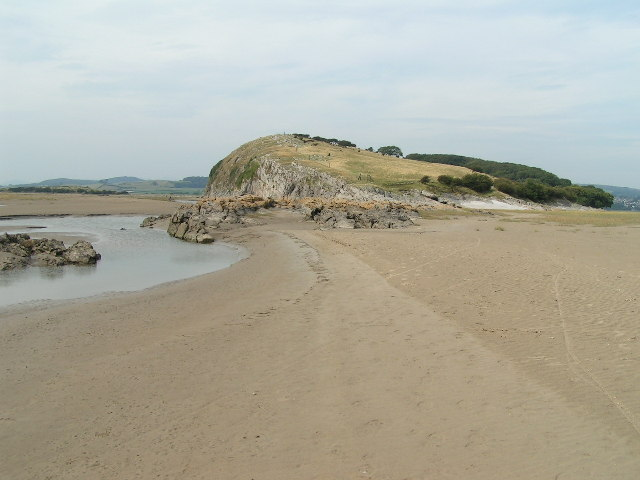
Humphrey Head from the sands

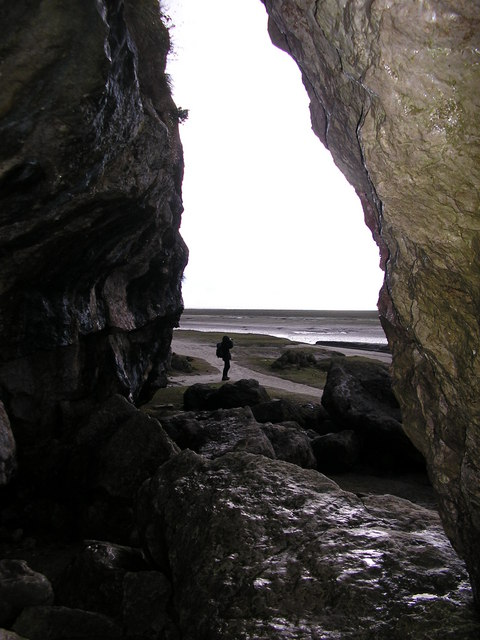
From the cave

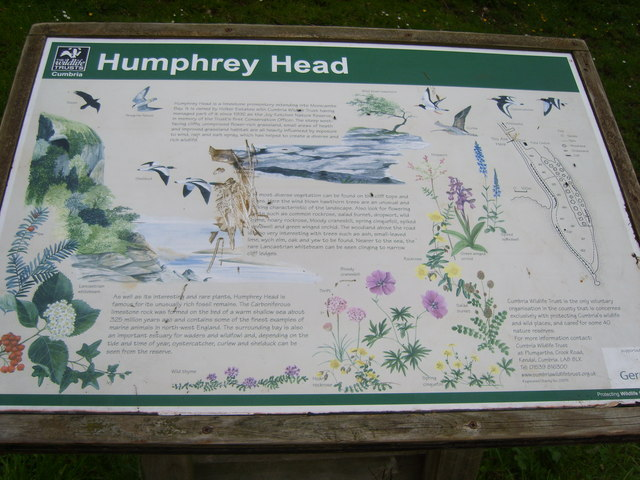
Nature Reserve Map

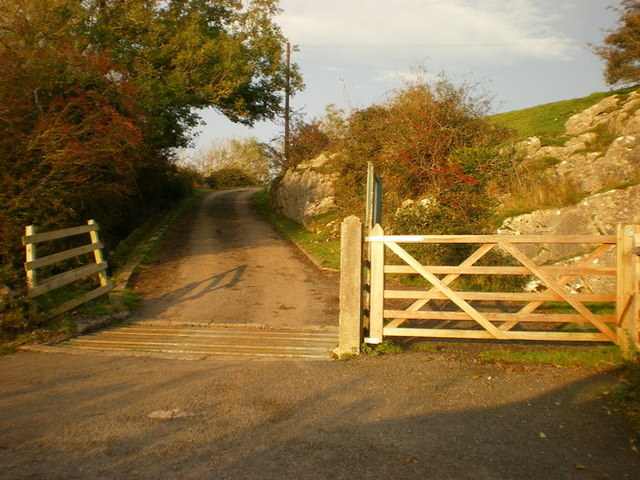
Entrance to Humphrey Head Outdoor Centre
