= Stainton Pike =

Coordinates: 54°20′11″N 3°18′11″W

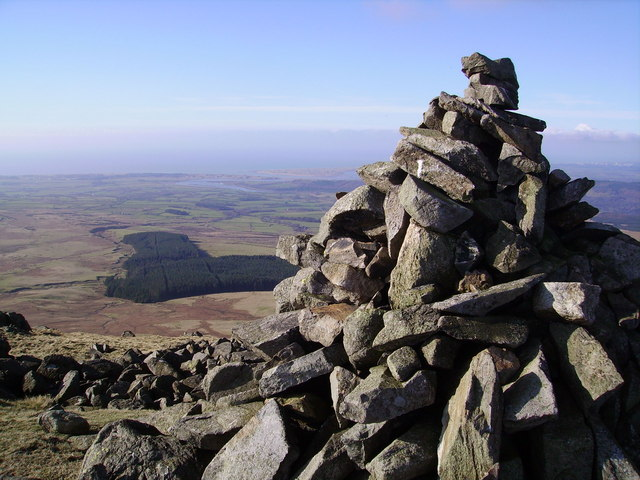
Stainton Pike summit cairn looking west towards the sea

Stainton Pike is a hill in the English Lake District, near Waberthwaite, Cumbria. It is the subject of a chapter of Wainwright's book The Outlying Fells of Lakeland. It reaches 1,550 feet (470 m) and Wainwright's anticlockwise circuit also visits The Knott at 1,071 feet (326 m) (this latter not to be confused with its namesake The Knott in the eastern Lake District, or the other "outlying fell" near Stickle Pike, or Knott north of Skiddaw). The walk also passes the waterfall Rowantree Force and collection of ancient enclosures and hut circles known as Barnscar or City of Barnscar.
