= Faulds Brow =

Low summit in the English Lake District

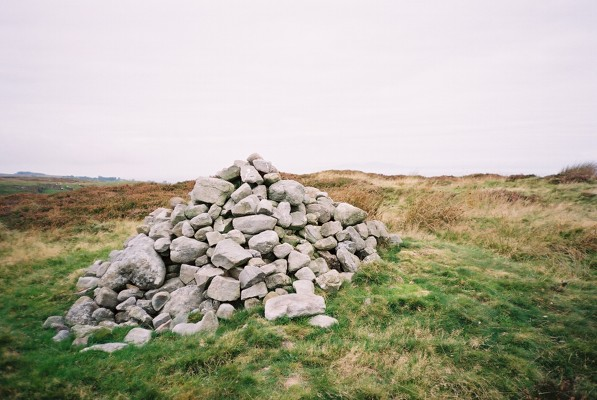
- Cairn on Faulds Brow

Highest point
- Elevation: 344 m (1,129 ft)
- Coordinates: 54.7568°N 3.0907°W

Geography
- Location: Cumbria, England
- OS grid: NY299407

Faulds Brow is a small rise in the English Lake District, northwest of the village of Caldbeck in Cumbria. It is the subject of a chapter of Wainwright's book The Outlying Fells of Lakeland. but its summit, at 344 metres (1,129 ft), is only slightly raised above the surrounding land. From a major road just to the south, the summit can be reached in minutes, with minimal effort. Nevertheless, the summit has wide views to High Pike to the south, and to the Solway Firth and beyond to Scotland to the north. Wainwright's recommended route, "to make a worthwhile walk", is an anticlockwise circuit from Caldbeck, mostly on minor roads.

The fell is largely covered by heather, and there is a small abandoned quarry just to the east of the summit. Prominently seen from the summit are two broadcasting antennas to the north, which lie just outside the Lake District National Park boundary, which passes just north of Faulds Brow.
