= Newton Fell =

Hill in Cumbria, England

Coordinates: 54°14′28″N 2°54′49″W

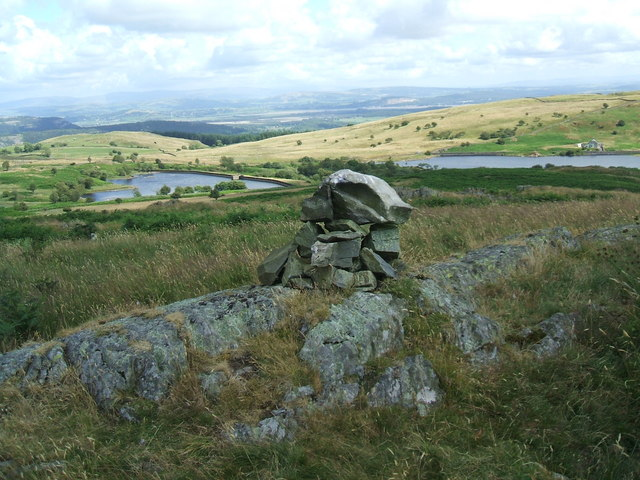
Cairn on Newton Fell

Newton Fell is a hill in the English Lake District near High Newton, south east of Newby Bridge, Cumbria. It lies to the north east of the A590 road. It is the subject of a chapter of Wainwright's book The Outlying Fells of Lakeland. Wainwright describes two walks, to the summits he calls Newton Fell (north) at 780 feet (240 m) and Newton Fell (south) or Dixon Heights at 585 feet (178 m). There are no public rights of way to either summit, and he states that the walks should be done "by courtesy of the owners and tenants".
