= Beacon Fell, Cumbria =

Fell in the southern Lake District of England

Beacon Fell
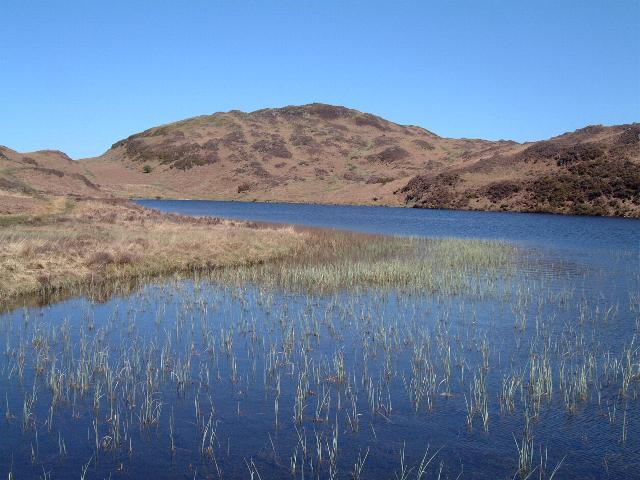
- Beacon Fell, looking across Beacon Tarn.

Highest point
- Elevation: 255 m (837 ft)
- Listing: Outlying Wainwright
- Coordinates: 54°18′25″N 3°06′36″W

Geography
- Location: Lake District, England

Beacon Fell is a fell in the southern Lake District of England with an altitude of 836 feet (255 m). It is the subject of a chapter of Wainwright's book The Outlying Fells of Lakeland.

Geographically, the fell is in the Blawith Fells to the west of the bottom end of Coniston Water. The fell is above Beacon Tarn and can be accessed from quiet paths off the main road from Water Yeat to Torver. Wainwright describes an ascent from Brown Howe, passing over the summit and down to Beacon Tarn (also visited on his Woodland Fell walk) before returning on the western slopes on the line of the Cumbria Way.

Although it is relatively low, it has panoramic views of the Coniston Fells, Coniston Water and Morecambe Bay.

Beacon Tarn fault, part of the Coniston Fault complex, passes under the East side of Beacon Tarn. The fault line runs in an approx N 10 degrees E direction.
