= Carron Crag =

Fell in the Lake District, Cumbria, England

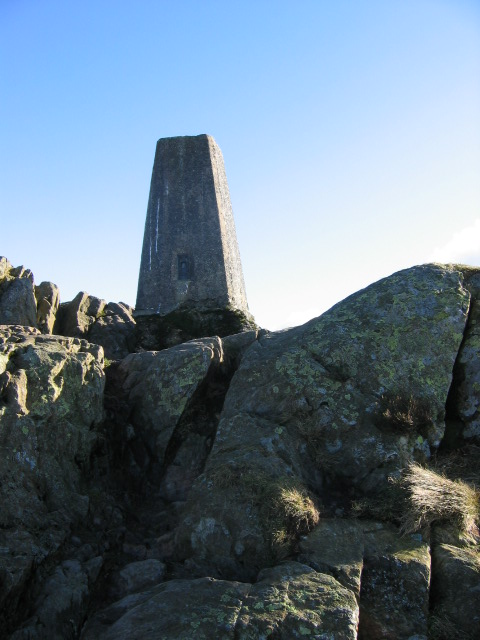
- Trig point on Carron Crag

Highest point
- Elevation: 314 m (1,030 ft)
- Listing: Outlying Wainwright
- Coordinates: 54°20′23″N 3°02′23″W

Geography
- Location within the Lake District
- Location: Cumbria, England
- Parent range: Lake District Outlying Fells
- OS grid: SD325943
- Topo map: OS Outdoor Leisure 7

Carron Crag is a small fell in Grizedale Forest in the English Lake District with a height of 314 metres (1,030 ft). Adjacent to the trig point is a large panopticon sculpture, one of over 70 in the forest. It is the second highest point in Grizedale Forest after Top o'Selside.

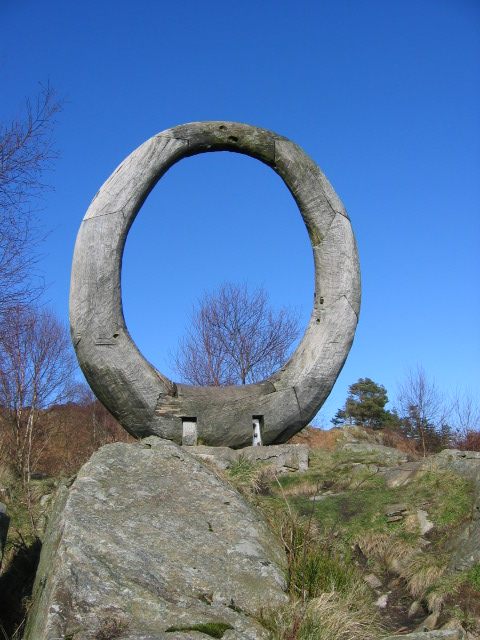
Panopticon sculpture looking North

It is the subject of a chapter of Wainwright's book The Outlying Fells of Lakeland. Wainwright describes a circular walk from Grizedale.

== Letterbox ==
Near the trig point is one of a series of hidden letterboxes placed in various locations throughout the Lake District.

- From the trig point go 70 paces 335° to a large standing stone type boulder; the box is 5 paces away under a rock in a small cave behind stones.
