= Dunnerdale Fells =

Upland area in Cumbria, England

Coordinates: 54°18′58″N 3°13′11″W

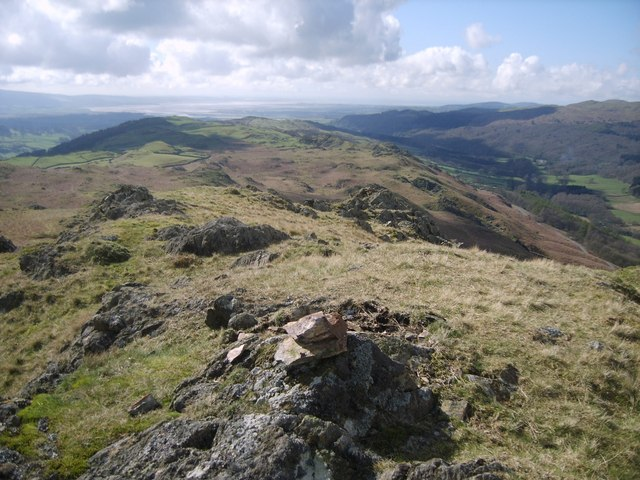
Dunnerdale Fells, looking towards the coast

Dunnerdale Fells is an upland area in the English Lake District, between Ulpha and Broughton Mills, Cumbria. It is the subject of a chapter of Wainwright's book The Outlying Fells of Lakeland. Wainwright's route starts from a minor road on the west of the fell, in the valley of the River Duddon, to reach a cairned summit at 920 feet (280 m), and returns on the same route for part of the way before making a small anticlockwise loop. He mentions "the feature of most interest being a remarkable profusion of ancient cairns".
