= Borrow Beck =

Stream in Cumbria, England

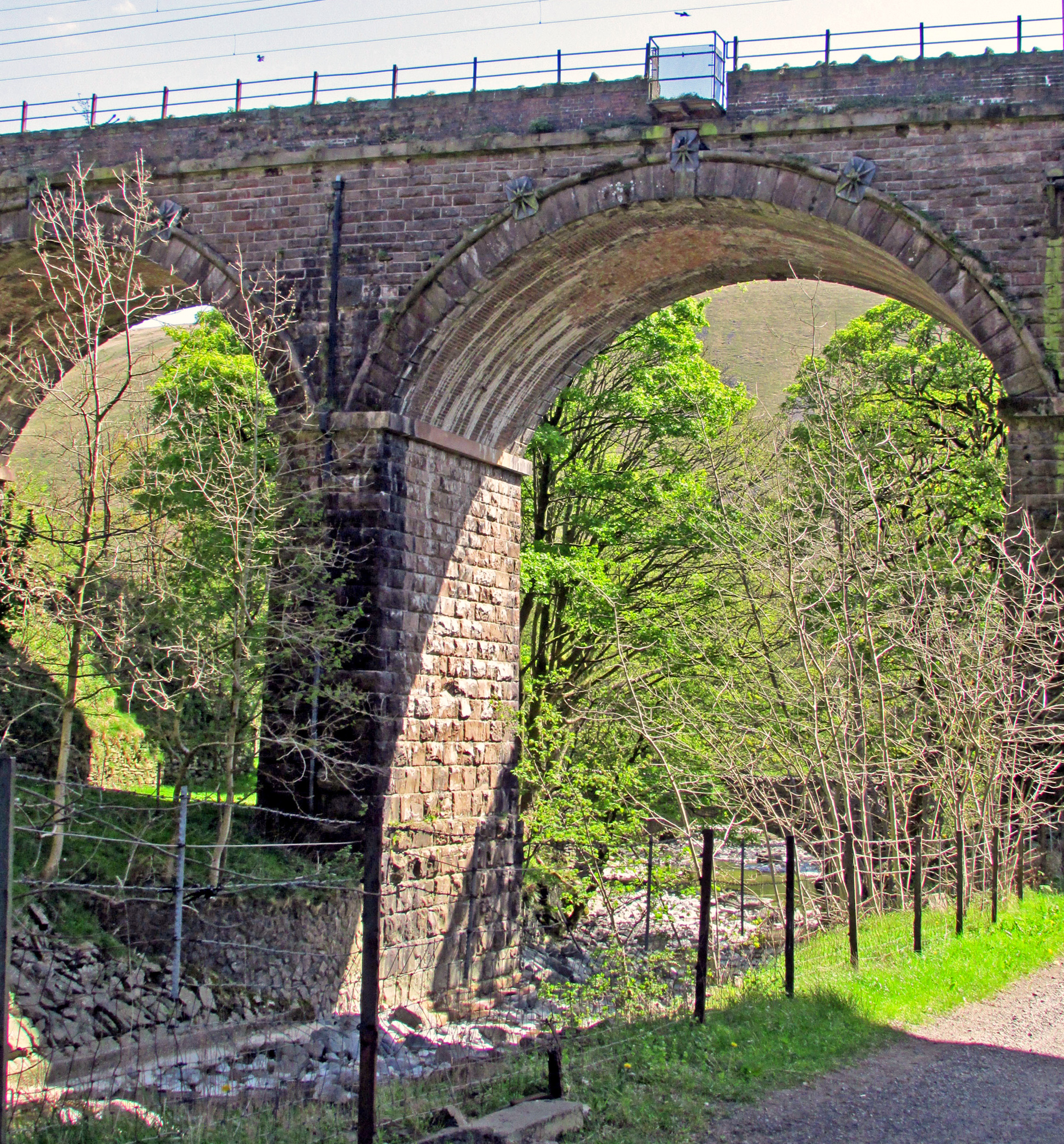
Borrow Beck (left) running under the 1840s-built Borrow Beck Viaduct on the West Coast Main Line shortly before joining the River Lune, visible in the background

Borrow Beck is a stream running through Cumbria, England on the eastern edge of the English Lake District. The area previously formed part of the traditional county of Westmorland.

Rising at approximately 1700 feet on Borrowdale Moss near Lord's Seat, the beck runs a southeasterly course for a total of seven miles, being joined by Crookdale Beck at High Borrow Bridge on the A6 Trunk Road between Kendal and Shap.

It then runs down through Borrowdale (sometimes known as "Westmorland Borrowdale", to distinguish it from the better known Borrowdale in the central Lake District).

At Low Borrow Bridge, within a very short stretch, it runs under the A685 Kendal to Tebay Road, then the M6 Motorway and lastly the West Coast Main Line which is carried over Borrow Beck Viaduct at this point. The beck then drains into the River Lune at an elevation of approximately 490 feet above sea level, 2.5 miles south of Tebay, the confluence of the watercourses being overlooked by a small Roman fort.
