= Bigland Barrow =

Hill in Haverthwaite, Cumbria, England

Coordinates: 54°14′52″N 2°58′40″W

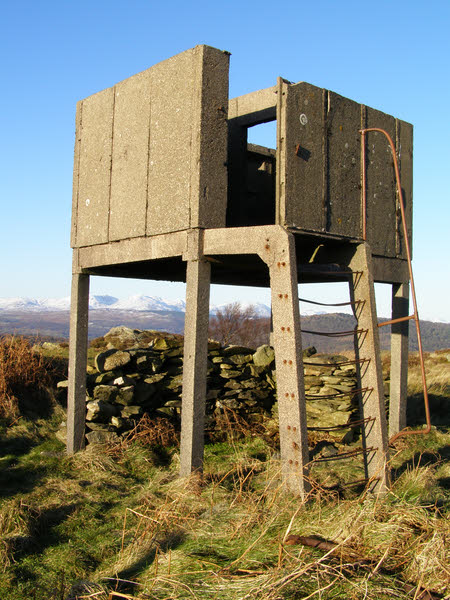
Lookout tower on Bigland Barrow

Bigland Barrow is a hill in the English Lake District, near Backbarrow, Cumbria. It is the subject of a chapter of Wainwright's book The Outlying Fells of Lakeland. It reaches 630 feet (190 m), and there is a concrete lookout tower on the summit which Wainwright describes as "a wartime relic". Wainwright's route is an anticlockwise circuit from Newby Bridge.
