= Naddle Horseshoe =

Coordinates: 54°31′42″N 2°45′31″W

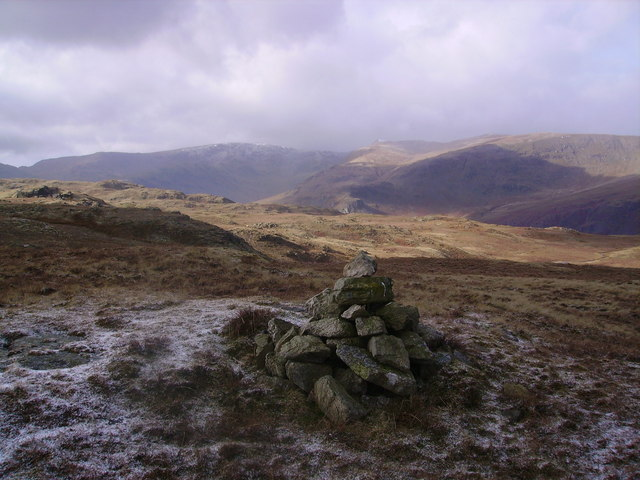
The cairn on Hare Shaw, the highest point of the walk, looking towards High Street

The Naddle Horseshoe is a group of summits in the English Lake District, south of Mardale valley, Cumbria. It is the subject of a chapter of Wainwright's book The Outlying Fells of Lakeland.

Wainwright's walk starts at Swindale and ascends Scalebarrow Knott at 1,109 feet (338 m) before making a clockwise circuit of the valley of Naddle Beck (not to be confused with the better known Naddle Beck which runs north to the River Greta near Keswick). His route includes Harper Hills at 1,358 feet (414 m), Hare Shaw at 1,639 feet (500 m), Naddle High Forest (this and the next are "nameless" according to Wainwright) at 1,427 feet (435 m), Wallow Crag at 1,380 feet (420 m), a nameless summit at 1,390 feet (420 m), and Hugh's Laithes Pike at 1,390 feet (420 m).
