= Crookdale Horseshoe =

Coordinates: 54°26′45″N 2°43′23″W

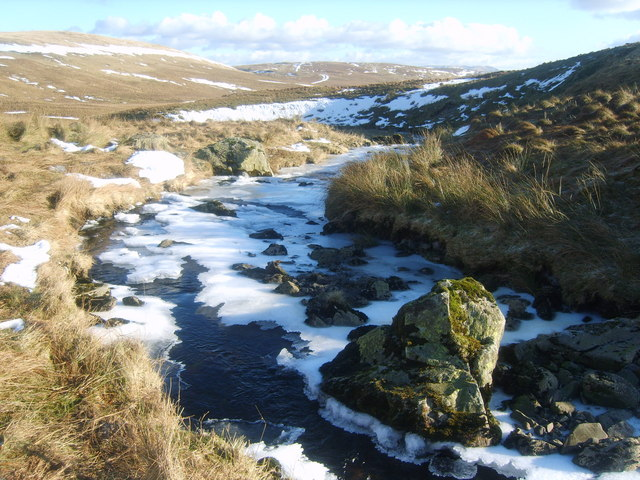
Crookdale Beck in winter

The Crookdale Horseshoe is a group of hills on the eastern edge of the English Lake District, in Cumbria, west of the A6 road. They are the subject of a chapter of Wainwright's book The Outlying Fells of Lakeland. Wainwright describes an anticlockwise walk starting along the valley of Crookdale Beck (which joins Borrow Beck before flowing into the River Lune) to reach Lord's Seat (one of several English summits of that name, and also known as High House Fell) at 1,719 feet (524 m), and returning over Robin Hood at 1,613 feet (492 m) and High House Bank at 1,627 feet (496 m). As he points out, the ridge forming the northern part of the "horseshoe" is described in his Wasdale Horseshoe chapter.
