= Green Quarter Fell =

Upland area

Coordinates: 54°25′41″N 2°49′15″W

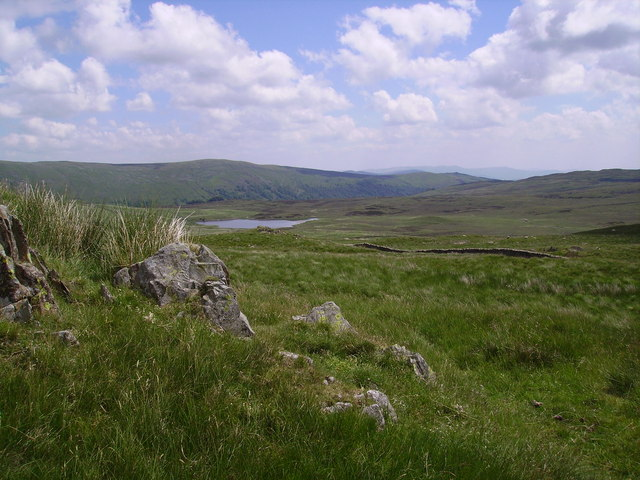
On Green Quarter Fell, looking towards Skeggles Water

Green Quarter Fell is an upland area in the east of the English Lake District, near Kentmere village, Cumbria. It is the subject of a chapter of Wainwright's book The Outlying Fells of Lakeland. Wainwright's walk is an anticlockwise circuit from Kentmere, reaching the summit of Hollow Moor at 1,394 feet (425 m) and a nameless summit at 1,370 feet (420 m) and making a detour to admire the tarn of Skeggles Water. He says that the walk offers "a perfectly-balanced and lovely view of upper Kentmere ... that cries aloud for a camera."
