= Wasdale Horseshoe =

Hills in Cumbria, England

Coordinates: 54°27′56″N 2°42′08″W

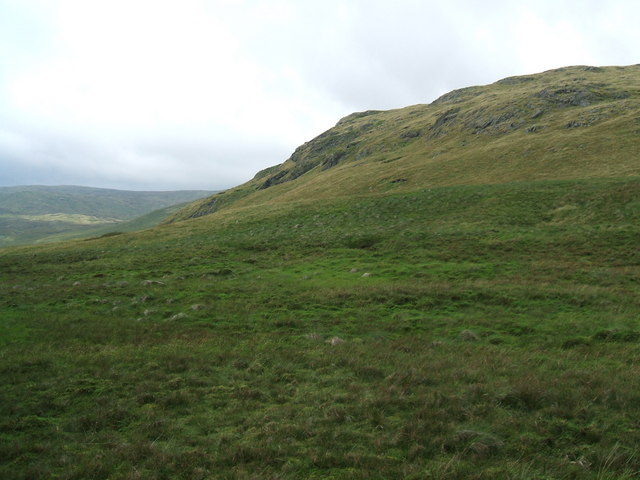
Yarlside Crag on Great Yarlside

The Wasdale Horseshoe is a group of hills on the eastern fringe of the English Lake District, to the west of the A6, south of Shap, Cumbria. They surround the valley of Wasdale Beck, a tributary of Birk Beck and ultimately of the River Lune. The horseshoe is the subject of a chapter of Wainwright's book The Outlying Fells of Lakeland. This Wasdale should not be confused with the better known Wasdale, containing Wast Water, on the west of the Lake District.

Wainwright's clockwise walk starts from the highest point of the A6 at 1,400 feet (430 m). The summits reached are Whatshaw Common at 1,593 feet (486 m), Little Yarlside at 1,691 feet (515 m), Great Yarlside (the third highest of the Outlying Fells) at 1,986 feet (605 m) and Wasdale Pike at 1,852 feet (564 m).

Wasdale Pike is within the Shap Fells area, which is a Site of Special Scientific Interest.
