= Stickle Pike =

Mountain in the English Lake District, Cumbria, England

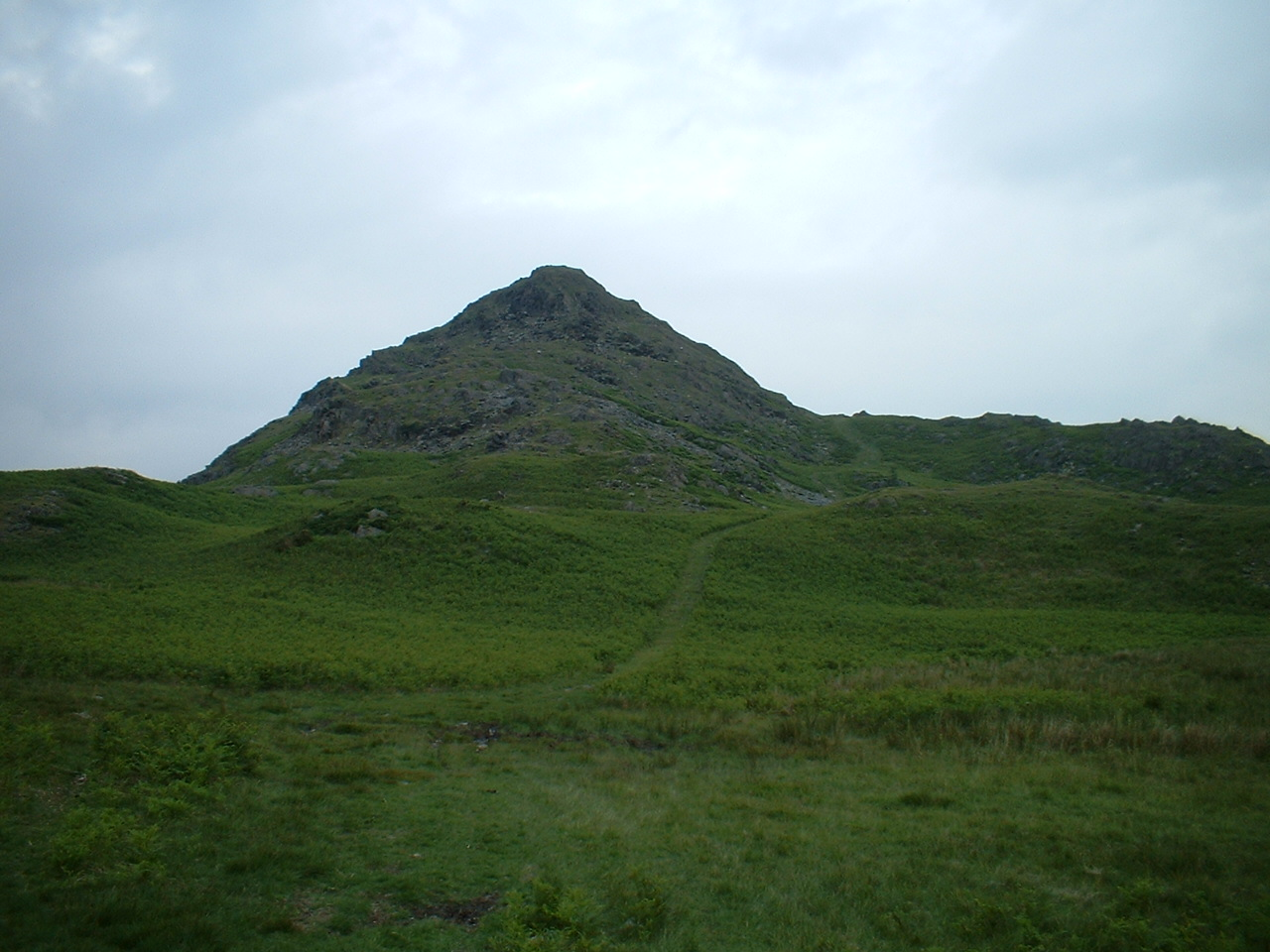
- Looking to Stickle Pike from the continuing southerly ridge to Great Stickle.

Highest point
- Elevation: 375 m (1,230 ft)
- Listing: Outlying Wainwright

Geography
- Location: Lake District, England
- OS grid: SD 21202 92796

Stickle Pike is an outlying fell located in the southern Lake District near the small town of Broughton-in-Furness, with the summit situated between the lower Duddon Valley and the quiet smaller valley of Dunnerdale. Despite its low altitude (375 m, or 1230 ft) the sharp, conical summit is prominent in views from the Broughton and high Furness areas. As with many of the Dunnerdale and Coniston fells, there are reminders of the area's former mining past in the form of many spoil heaps, disused levels and shafts. The fell is also notable for its wide-ranging views despite its low altitude, especially to the Scafells to the north and the sands of the Duddon Estuary to the south. A "stickle" is a hill with a prominent rocky top.

The fell is most easily (and commonly) ascended from the Kiln Bank fell road between Hall Dunnerdale and Broughton Mills, with the top lying less than half a mile from the road summit. An alternative ascent (suggested by Alfred Wainwright) can be made from Broughton Mills along the Great Stickle/Tarn Hill ridge, with a return either down the Dunnerdale valley road or via the bridleway on the east side of the valley.

The fell is the subject of a chapter of Wainwright's book The Outlying Fells of Lakeland. His clockwise circuit from Broughton Mills includes Great Stickle at 1,001 feet (305 m), Tarn Hill at 1,231 feet (375 m), Stickle Pike, a "nameless summit" at 1,183 feet (361 m), north of Raven's Crag which is bypassed, and The Knott at 925 feet (282 m). This last shares its name with The Knott above Hayeswater in the far eastern fells and another outlying fell near Stainton Pike, as well as with Knott north of Skiddaw.
