= Top o'Selside =

Hill in Cumbria, England

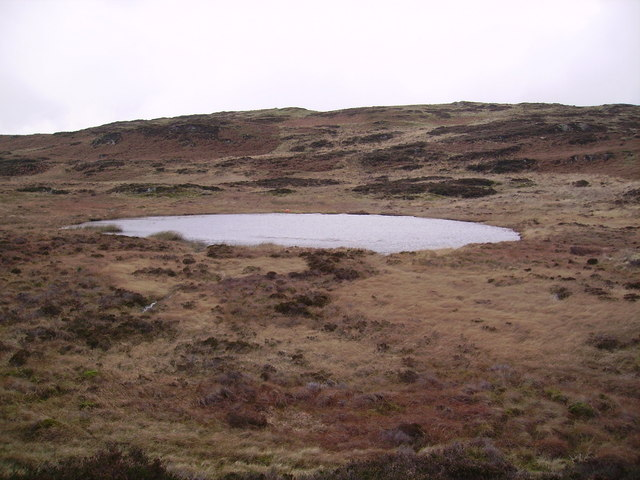
- The summit behind Arnsbarrow Tarn

Highest point
- Elevation: 335 m (1,099 ft)
- Prominence: 191 m (627 ft)
- Parent peak: Old Man of Coniston
- Listing: Marilyn, Outlying Wainwright
- Coordinates: 54°19′05″N 3°03′50″W

Geography
- Location within the Lake District
- Location: Cumbria, England
- Parent range: Lake District South-Eastern Fells
- OS grid: SD309919
- Topo map: OS Landranger 96

Top o'Selside is a hill in the Lake District in Cumbria, England. At 335 metres (1,099 ft), it is the highest point of the group of hills situated between Coniston Water and Windermere. This group also includes the Wainwright of Black Fell and the summits of Black Brows and Rusland Heights. Top o'Selside lies not in the centre of this region, but in the south-western corner, just outside the forestry plantations of Grizedale Forest and only two-thirds of a mile from the eastern shore of Coniston Water. This large separation from any higher ground gives it enough relative height to make it a Marilyn.

== Ascents ==
It is listed in Alfred Wainwright's Pictorial Guide to the Outlying Fells, where the author gives an anticlockwise circuit from High Nibthwaite reaching the summit by way of a nameless summit at 228 metres (748 ft) (actually one of two cairns visited on the western edge of Brock Barrow), Low Light Haw at 2,660 feet (810 m), High Light Haw at 260 metres (860 ft), and returning to the west. This walk is a little over four miles and involves about a thousand feet of climb. Wainwright's location is not the highest point of the fell, being 100m to the west of the true summit and 1m lower.

The western slopes (named Selside, from which the hill derives its name) are entirely forested, but a path zigzags up the steep fellside from a parking area at grid ref. SD 299927. This provides the shortest route to the summit and is two miles long (there and back).

The view is very impressive, although only a small portion of Coniston Water can be seen from the summit. The Old Man of Coniston, Black Combe, the Helvellyn and High Street groups all feature prominently, as well as Ingleborough in the Yorkshire Dales.

There are extensive views of Coniston Water from the two cairns which Wainwright visits on the ascent, and from the track used for the return journey.

== Tarn ==
There is a small sheet of water to the south of the summit, Arnsbarrow Tarn (pictured above). According to Heaton Cooper, the tarn is held in the moraines left by two glaciers moving down each valley. He also says the area was populated by lawless brigands in the 14th century, who were led by Adam de Beaumont. They held the neighbourhood in terror for seventeen years from 1346 to 1363, when they were finally caught. Arnesbarrow is a Norse name meaning burial place or stronghold of Arne.

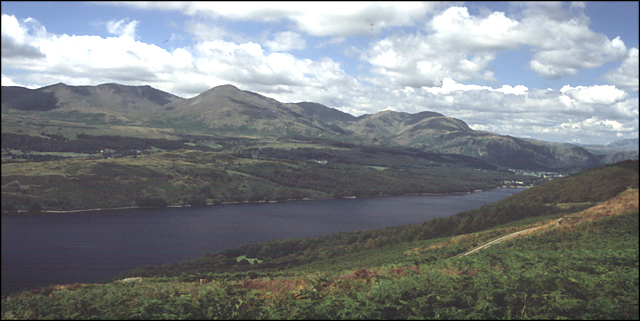
The view down Coniston Water from just north of the summit

== See also ==
- List of fells in the Lake District
- List of Marilyns in England
