= Pictorial Guide to the Lakeland Fells =

Area guide

The 2005 anniversary cover of The Eastern Fells. Apart from the bottom banner, the design has not changed since first publication.

A Pictorial Guide to the Lakeland Fells is a series of seven books by A. Wainwright, detailing the fells (the local word for hills and mountains) of the Lake District in northwest England. Written over a period of 13 years from 1952, they consist entirely of reproductions of Wainwright's manuscript, hand-produced in pen and ink with no typeset material.

The series has been in print almost continuously since it was first published between 1955 and 1966, with more than 2 million copies sold. It is still regarded by many walkers as the definitive guide to the Lakeland mountains. The 214 fells described in the seven volumes have become known as the Wainwrights. As of 2013 the Long Distance Walkers Association (LDWA) register of those who have climbed all the fells listed 674 names. The Wainwright Society maintains a "register of current Society members who have climbed all 214 fells".

== First editions ==
The first five books were originally published by Wainwright's friend, Henry Marshall, Chief Librarian of Kendal and Westmorland, who took charge of publicity and administration. Another friend, Sandy Hewitson (of Bateman and Hewitson Ltd) agreed to print the books using Wainwright's original manuscript, although in fact the printing was done by The Westmorland Gazette in Kendal, who had taken over Bateman and Hewitson Ltd. From 1963, Westmorland Gazette also became the publisher, and their name appears as such on the first impressions of Books Six and Seven. The books, together with details of the first impressions, are:

- Book One – The Eastern Fells, published by Henry Marshall in 1955 (no dustwrapper, dark green cloth boards with gold lettering)
- Book Two – The Far Eastern Fells, published by Henry Marshall in 1957 (dustwrapper priced 12/6, grey cloth boards with red lettering)
- Book Three – The Central Fells, published by Henry Marshall in 1958 (dustwrapper priced 12/6, light blue cloth boards with silver lettering)
- Book Four – The Southern Fells, published by Henry Marshall in 1960 (dustwrapper priced 12/6, brownish orange cloth boards with dark blue lettering)
- Book Five – The Northern Fells, published by Henry Marshall in 1962 (dustwrapper priced 12/6, reddish brown cloth boards with silver lettering)
- Book Six – The North Western Fells, published by Westmorland Gazette in 1964 (dustwrapper priced 12/6, yellow cloth boards with dark blue lettering)
- Book Seven – The Western Fells, published by Westmorland Gazette in 1966 (dustwrapper priced 15/-, green boards with silver lettering)

The second impression of Book One, released at Easter 1956, came with a dustwrapper, and customers who had previously bought a jacket-less first impression could obtain a dustwrapper from the printer. As a result, most first impressions of Book One still in existence usually have a dustwrapper priced at 12/6. In 1992, a year after Wainwright's death, Michael Joseph took control of all of Wainwright's books, including the Pictorial Guides, a change of which Wainwright himself was in favour. When they ceased publication in 2003, the rights were bought by Frances Lincoln who shortly afterwards embarked on a revised Second Edition of the guides.

== Style and layout ==
A typical page from The Southern Fells, describing an ascent of Pike of Blisco. The diagrams of ascent are perhaps the most innovative feature of the Pictorial Guides.

Each of the fells covered by the guides has its own chapter, which normally includes a map of the fell, comprehensive details and 3-dimensional drawings of ascent routes, ridge routes to other fells, routes of descent and a description of the summit. Carefully annotated pen and ink drawings of ascents and views accompany the details of each fell. Each book starts with a description of the geography of the area and ends with Some personal notes in conclusion.

Unlike many authors who dedicate books to particular people known to them, Wainwright commences each book with an unusual dedication. These are:

- Book 1: "The Men of the Ordnance Survey"
- Book 2: "The Men who Built the Stone Walls"
- Book 3: "The Dogs of Lakeland"
- Book 4: "The Sheep of Lakeland"
- Book 5: "The Solitary wanderers on the fells"
- Book 6: "My right leg and my left leg"
- Book 7: "All who have helped me"

Wainwright, notoriously shy, also includes one drawing of himself in each book, generally from behind, of him admiring a particular view. These are:

- Book 1: View of Blencathra from Clough Head
- Book 2: View of Haweswater from Harter Fell
- Book 3: View of Thirlmere from Raven Crag
- Book 4: View of the Pinnacle, Scafell
- Book 5: Binsey summit with "ancient Briton" (i.e. the author)
- Book 6: View of High Stile from Lanthwaite Hill
- Book 7: View of Yewbarrow from Gatherstone Head

In the notes at the end of Book 7, Wainwright lists what he considers to be the 'finest half-dozen' fells in Lakeland. His list consists of:

- Scafell Pike
- Bowfell
- Pillar
- Great Gable
- Blencathra
- Crinkle Crags

A 50th anniversary edition and a box set of the original edition have been published. Leather bound versions can be found secondhand.

== Second editions ==
Between 2005 and 2009, the series was factually revised by the publishers Frances Lincoln, to adjust the content to the present-day Lake District. Chris Jesty undertook the revisions, using an imitation of Wainwright's hand lettering to make the alterations look as unobtrusive as possible. The most notable changes are that the covers of the revised books show photographs of the Lake District by Derry Brabbs, rather than the drawings that were on the covers of the originals, and the maps show the main paths in red.

The books, with the ISBNs of the revised editions, are:

- Book 1 – The Eastern Fells (2005) ISBN 0-7112-2454-4
- Book 2 – The Far Eastern Fells (2005) ISBN 0-7112-2455-2
- Book 3 – The Central Fells (2006) ISBN 0-7112-2456-0
- Book 4 – The Southern Fells (2007) ISBN 0-7112-2457-9
- Book 5 – The Northern Fells (2008) ISBN 0-7112-2458-7
- Book 6 – The Northwestern Fells (2008) ISBN 0-7112-2459-5
- Book 7 – The Western Fells (2009) ISBN 0-7112-2460-9

Revised editions of Wainwright's other Pictorial Guides, A Coast to Coast Walk, The Outlying Fells of Lakeland and Pennine Way Companion were published between 2010 and 2012, with the amendments again being made by Chris Jesty. Revised editions of Walks in Limestone Country and Walks on the Howgill Fells were published in April 2014.

== Third editions ==
A third edition of the guides, known as the Walkers Edition, was revised by Clive Hutchby. Book One: The Eastern Fells was published in March 2015; Book Two: The Far Eastern Fells was published in October 2015; Book Three: The Central Fells, was published in March 2016. Books Four: The Southern Fells was published in April 2017: Book Five: The Northern Fells was published in March 2018; Book Six: The North Western Fells was published in March 2019 and Book Seven: The Western Fells was published in June 2020.

== Wainwright bagging ==
The 214 fells included in the series are now generally known as 'the Wainwrights'. These range in height from 985 feet (Castle Crag) to 3210 feet (Scafell Pike). Completing all the Wainwrights is a popular peak bagging challenge. The Wainwrights differ from other bagging lists such as the Munros and Marilyns, however, in that Wainwright never set out to compile such a list himself, and inclusion is not based on objective criteria such as elevation or prominence.

== See also ==
- List of Wainwrights
- The Outlying Fells of Lakeland
