= High Knott =

Coordinates: 54°23′38″N 2°50′30″W

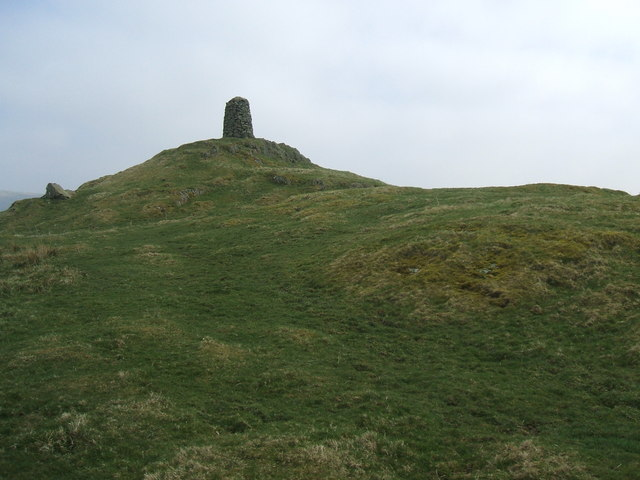
Williamson's Monument on the summit of High Knott

High Knott, marked on some Ordnance Survey maps as Williamson's Monument, is a hill in the eastern part of the English Lake District, near Staveley, Cumbria. The monument on its summit was built by the Reverend T. Williamson in 1803, in memory of his father Thomas Williamson, who had climbed the fell every day before breakfast. The fell is the subject of a chapter of Wainwright's book The Outlying Fells of Lakeland. It reaches 901 feet (275 m) and Wainwright's route starts near the 17th-century Ulthwaite Bridge on the River Kent, climbing High Knott and then making a clockwise circuit to the early British village site at Hugill and "over the pleasant heights on the west side of mid-Kentmere".

Access to the summit is (at May 2016) forbidden by the landowner.
