= Stickles =

Stickles is the surname of:

- Edward Stickles (born 1942), American former swimmer and swimming coach
- Monty Stickles (1938-2006), American National Football League player
- Terri Stickles (born 1946), American former swimmer
- Patrick Stickles (born 1985), American punk rock musician
