= The Outlying Fells of Lakeland =

Wainwright book on Lake District peaks

- First edition cover
- Author: Alfred Wainwright
- Language: English
- Genre: Non-fiction
- Publication date: 1974
- ISBN: 0718140087

The Outlying Fells of Lakeland is a 1974 book written by Alfred Wainwright dealing with hills in and around the Lake District of England. It differs from Wainwright's Pictorial Guides in that each of its 56 chapters describes a walk, sometimes taking in several summits, rather than a single fell. This has caused some confusion on the part of authors attempting to prepare a definitive list of peaks. The Outlying Fells do not form part of the 214 hills generally accepted as making up the Wainwrights, but they are included in Category 2B of the Hill Walkers' Register maintained by the Long Distance Walkers Association.

== The book ==
The first edition was published in 1974 by The Westmorland Gazette. It was republished by Michael Joseph in 1992 (ISBN 0718140087) and a second edition, revised by Chris Jesty, was published by the Wainwright Society in 2020 (ISBN 9780993592126).

The first edition is uniform with the seven volumes of Wainwright's Pictorial Guides, with a yellow band at head and foot of the dustjacket. The wording on the cover, in Wainwright's characteristic handwritten style, is:

THE OUTLYING FELLS OF LAKELAND
being a Pictorial Guide
to the lesser fells
around the perimeter of Lakeland
written primarily for
old age pensioners and others
who can no longer climb high fells
but can still, within reason, potter
about on the short and easy slopes
and summits of the foothills.

Below this, there is a pen sketch showing an elderly but sprightly walker approaching the summit of a small hill, and Wainwright's signature.

== Fells included ==
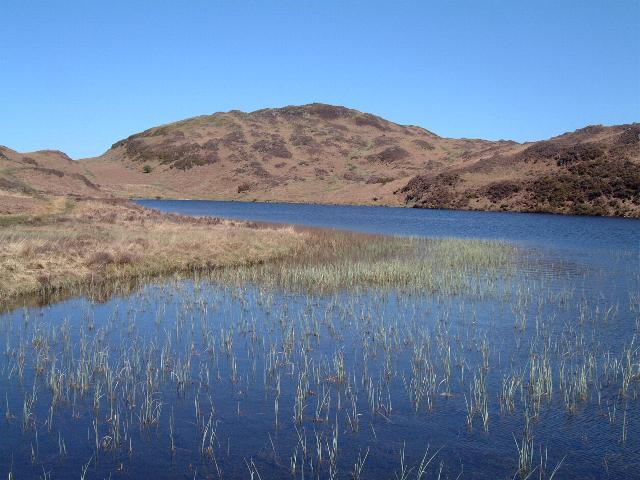
Beacon Fell, looking across Beacon Tarn

The arrangement of chapters in the book is clockwise starting in the south east, with the first chapter devoted to Scout Scar, a walk starting at Kendal Town Hall.

The list at the back of Wainwright's book contains 110 named fells and summits. Close inspection shows seven of them to refer to other hills in the list, while Newton Fell has two summits. Thus:

- Cartmel Fell is the same as Ravens Barrow (page 42).
- Hollow Moor is the summit of Green Quarter Fell (page 14).
- Hooker Crag is the summit of Muncaster fell (page 186).
- Newton Fell includes Newton Fell (North) and Newton Fell (South) (page 53).
- Potter Fell is the name given to the hill whose summits are Brunt Knotts and Ulgraves (page 8).
- Lord's Seat is the summit of Whitbarrow (page 36).
- Williamson's Monument is the same as High Knott (page 18).
- Woodland Fell is the name of the moor of which Yew Bank and Wool Knott are high points (page 102).

The addition of the 12 nameless summits brings the number of Wainwright's Outlying Fells to 116. This is 14 more than the 102 hills listed in John M. Turner's New Combined Indexes to A. Wainwright's Pictorial Guides (second edition, Lingdales Press, 1984). Turner's list omits two tops explicitly mentioned in the book (St. John's Hill and Newton Fell South) and the 12 nameless summits, and it contains many inaccuracies.

A second edition of Wainwright's book, revised by Chris Jesty, was published by Frances Lincoln in 2011 (ISBN 978-0-7112-3175-7). It maintains the same format but uses red to highlight paths on the route diagrams, and includes updated content (e.g. for Staveley Fell where Jesty says (p. 49) "There must be many people who, encouraged ... by the first edition of this book, have turned left and ... been turned back by an uncrossable fence." before providing an alternative route.)

== Highest and lowest ==
The highest three summits listed by Wainwright are:

- Walna Scar 2,035 feet (620 m)
- Black Combe 1,970 feet (600 m)
- Great Yarlside 1,986 feet (605 m) according to Wainwright; in reality 1,936 feet (590 m) (Note: The Database of British and Irish Hills records Wainwright's Great Yarside summit as hill 2575, 591 m (1,939 ft), and a nearby higher Great Yarlside summit as hill 3661 at 597 m (1,959 ft). An explanatory note suggests that Wainwright obtained his figure from a misprint in some editions of the OS maps.)

The lowest summits are:

- Humphrey Head 172 feet (52 m), of which Wainwright says "A fell it certainly is not, being a meagre 172 feet above the sea..."
- Cartmel Fell/Raven's Barrow 500 feet (150 m)
- Newton Fell South 585 feet (178 m)

== List of summits ==
The list below has been arranged in alphabetical order rather than height in order to align as far as possible with the list at the back of Wainwright's book. Summits are listed by the name used in the Database of British and Irish Hills, with cross-references from other summit names used by Wainwright to the entries in this table. Each summit appears only once, with height and grid reference. The "page" column allows the list to be sorted into Wainwright's order of chapters, which is roughly geographical, moving clockwise round the area from Kendal in the east.

List of summits, sortable by height, relative height, chapter title and page number
Summit	Height (m)	Relative height (m)	Grid ref.	Chapter	Page
Bannisdale Fell, Long Crag	493	32	NY515054	The Bannisdale Horseshoe	260
Beacon Fell	255	128	SD278907	Beacon Fell	98
Bigland Barrow	193	23	SD363839	Bigland Barrow	70
Black Combe	600	362	SD135854	Black Combe	162
Blawith Knott	248	88	SD260884	Blawith Knott	108
Boat How	337	81	NY177034	Boat How	178
Brant Fell	191	65	SD409961	Brant Fell	34
Brunt Knott	427	21	NY484006	Potter Fell	8
Buck Barrow	549	72	SD151910	Whit Fell	156
Burn Moor	543	23	SD151924	Whit Fell	156
Burney	298	111	SD260858	Burney	112
Caermote Hill	289	59	NY196371	Caermote Hill	206
Capplebarrow	513	21	NY508035	The Bannisdale Horseshoe	260
Carron Crag	314	66	SD325943	Carron Crag	88
Cartmel Fell see Raven's Barrow				Cartmel Fell	42
Caw	529	132	SD230944	Caw	120
Claife Heights	270	177	SD382973	Claife Heights	80
Clints Crags	245	10	NY159352	Clints Crags	204
Cold Fell	293	83	NY058092	Cold Fell	196
Cunswick Scar	207	37	SD491943	Scout Scar	2
Dent	345	5	NY037130	Flat Fell and Dent	198
Dunmallet	240	80	NY467246	Dunmallet	214
Dunnerdale Fells	280	12	SD207918	Dunnerdale Fells	132
Faulds Brow	344	26	NY299407	Faulds Brow	210
Fewling Stones	508	11	NY513117	Seat Robert	236
Finsthwaite Heights	180	0	SD361883	Finsthwaite Fell	74
Flat Fell	272	74	NY052137	Flat Fell and Dent	198
The Forest, Bannisdale Horseshoe 3	528	40	NY527035	The Bannisdale Horseshoe	260
Grandsire	251	80	SD432972	School Knott	30
Great Ladstones	440	1	NY532123	Seat Robert	236
Great Saddle Crag	560	2	NY526086	The Wet Sleddale Horseshoe	242
Great Stickle	305	27	SD211915	Stickle Pike	126
Great Worm Crag	427	32	SD193968	Great Worm Crag	136
Great Yarlside	591	6	NY525075	The Wasdale Horseshoe	248
Green Pikes	420	4	SD236950	Caw	120
Gummer's How	321	217	SD390884	Gummer's How	44
Hampsfell	220	1	SD399793	Hampsfell	58
Hare Shaw	503	13	NY497131	The Naddle Horseshoe	224
Harper Hills	414	4	NY510144	The Naddle Horseshoe	224
Hesk Fell	477	100	SD176946	Hesk Fell	140
Heughscar Hill	375	48	NY488231	Heughscar Hill	216
High House Bank	495	80	NY543048	The Crookdale Horseshoe	254
High Knott	275	56	NY454001	High Knott	18
High Light Haw	263	13	SD303904	Top o'Selside	92
High Wether Howe	531	66	NY515109	Seat Robert	236
Hollow Moor, Green Quarter Fell	426	78	NY468039	Green Quarter Fell	14
Hooker Crag see Muncaster Fell				Muncaster Fell	186
Howes	583	3	NY498103	Howes	230
Hugh's Laithes Pike	415	2	NY502151	The Naddle Horseshoe	224
Hugill Fell	265	11	SD462994	Hugill Fell	22
Humphrey Head	53	42	SD391738	Humphrey Head	66
Irton Pike	229	25	NY120015	Irton Pike	182
Kinmont Buck Barrow	535	25	SD146909	Whit Fell	156
Knipescar Common, Knipe Scar	342	8	NY526191	Knipescar Common	220
The Knott, Stainton Pike	331	21	SD143951	Stainton Pike	150
The Knott, Stickle Pike	284	24	SD224919	Stickle Pike	126
Lamb Pasture	367	28	NY534021	The Bannisdale Horseshoe	260
Langhowe Pike	400	10	NY528134	Seat Robert	236
Latterbarrow	244	44	SD367991	Latterbarrow	84
Little Yarlside	516	9	NY530071	The Wasdale Horseshoe	248
Long Crag see Bannisdale Fell, Long Crag				The Bannisdale Horseshoe	260
Lord's Seat, High House Fell	524	36	NY518066	The Crookdale Horseshoe	254
Lord's Seat, Whitbarrow see Whitbarrow				Whitbarrow	36
Low Light Haw	250	16	SD301900	Top o'Selside	92
Muncaster Fell, Hooker Crag	231	194	SD112983	Muncaster Fell	186
Nabs Moor	492	2	NY503111	Howes	230
Naddle High Forest, Naddle Horseshoe 1	435	28	NY492143	The Naddle Horseshoe	224
Newton Fell North	239	0	SD395842	Newton Fell	52
Newton Fell South, Dixon Heights	177	37	SD413815	Newton Fell	52
Orrest Head	238	63	SD414993	Orrest Head	26
The Pike, Hesk Fell	370	72	SD186934	Hesk Fell	140
Pikes	469	41	SD237947	Caw	120
Ponsonby Fell	315	34	NY081070	Ponsonby Fell	192
Raven's Barrow, Cartmel Fell	152	0	SD412879	Cartmel Fell	42
Raven's Crag	361	28	SD223929	Stickle Pike	126
Reston Scar	255	20	SD460988	Reston Scar	24
Robin Hood	493	30	NY530058	The Crookdale Horseshoe	254
Rough Crag	319	70	SD161977	The Circuit of Devoke Water	144
St. John's Hill, Caermote Hill N top	285	7	NY196376	Caermote Hill	206
Scalebarrow Knott	338	9	NY519153	The Naddle Horseshoe	224
School Knott	247	32	SD428967	School Knott	30
Scout Scar	233	3	SD486919	Scout Scar	2
Seat How, Birker Moor	311	58	SD165971	The Circuit of Devoke Water	144
Seat Robert	515	30	NY526114	Seat Robert	236
Setmurthy Common see Watch Hill, Setmurthy Common				Watch Hill	202
Sleddale Pike	506	6	NY535094	The Wet Sleddale Horseshoe	242
Stainton Pike	498	20	SD152942	Stainton Pike	150
Staveley Fell	265	37	SD389868	Staveley Fell	48
Stickle Pike	375	116	SD212928	Stickle Pike	126
Stoupdale Head	472	26	SD151873	Black Combe	162
Swinklebank Crag, Bannisdale Horseshoe 2	554	46	NY500049	The Bannisdale Horseshoe	260
Tarn Hill	313	30	SD209921	Stickle Pike	126
Todd Fell	401	21	NY512020	The Bannisdale Horseshoe	260
Top o'Selside	334	5	SD308918	Top o'Selside	92
Tottlebank Height	236	26	SD269885	Blawith Knott	108
Ulgraves	333	31	SD511996	Potter Fell	8
Ulthwaite Rigg	502	2	NY514093	The Wet Sleddale Horseshoe	242
Wallow Crag, Naddle Horseshoe 2	435	29	NY496149	The Naddle Horseshoe	224
Walna Scar	621	15	SD257963	Walna Scar	114
Wasdale Pike	565	5	NY536084	The Wasdale Horseshoe	248
Watch Hill	235	3	NY149318	Watch Hill	202
Watch Hill, Setmurthy Common	254	157	NY159318	Watch Hill	202
Water Crag	305	37	SD153974	The Circuit of Devoke Water	144
Whatshaw Common	485	66	NY541061	The Wasdale Horseshoe	248
Whitbarrow (Lord's Seat)	215	182	SD441870	Whitbarrow	36
White Combe	417	4	SD154862	Black Combe	162
White Howe, Bannisdale	530	73	NY523041	The Bannisdale Horseshoe	260
White Pike, Birkby Fell	442	17	SD150956	The Circuit of Devoke Water	144
Whiteside Pike	397	47	NY520015	The Bannisdale Horseshoe	260
Whitfell	573	221	SD158929	Whit Fell	156
Williamson's Monument see High Knott				High Knott	18
Woodend Height	487	11	SD156954	The Circuit of Devoke Water	144
Wool Knott	223	53	SD272896	Woodland Fell	102
Yew Bank	207	17	SD262909	Woodland Fell	102
Yoadcastle	494	57	SD156952	The Circuit of Devoke Water	144
nameless, Bannisdale Horseshoe 1 see Swinklebank Crag				The Bannisdale Horseshoe	260
nameless, Bannisdale Horseshoe 2 - Ancrow Brow N	541	16	NY503059	The Bannisdale Horseshoe	260
nameless, Bannisdale Horseshoe 3 see The Forest				The Bannisdale Horseshoe	260
nameless, Green Quarter Fell	411	11	NY473042	Green Quarter Fell	14
nameless, Naddle Horseshoe 1 see Naddle High Forest				The Naddle Horseshoe	224
nameless, Naddle Horseshoe 2 see Wallow Crag				The Naddle Horseshoe	224
nameless, Naddle Horseshoe 3	395	7	NY505152	The Naddle Horseshoe	224
nameless, Potter Fell 1	395	27	SD489998	Potter Fell	8
nameless, Potter Fell 2	390	45	NY496003	Potter Fell	8
nameless, School Knott	247	32	SD428967	School Knott	30
nameless, Stickle Pike see Raven's Crag				Stickle Pike	126
nameless, Top o'Selside, Brock Barrow	221	3	SD298898	Top o'Selside	92

== Map ==
The map marks the highest point reached on each of Wainwright's 56 walks. The number adjacent to each point gives the page number of the corresponding chapter in the book and the colour indicates the general height of the summit. Clicking a number provides a link to the article about the fell in question.

Wainwright's "Outlying Fells"

== See also ==
- List of Wainwrights
- List of Birketts
- List of fells in the Lake District – alphabetical and height listings
- List of hills in the Lake District – topographical groupings

== Sources ==
- Wainwright, A. (1974). The Outlying Fells of Lakeland. Kendal: Westmorland Gazette.
- Wainwright, A. (2011). The Outlying Fells of Lakeland. Revised by Chris Jesty (2nd ed.). Frances Lincoln. ISBN 978-0-7112-3175-7.
