= Great Stickle =

Fell in Lake District, England

- The summit of Great Stickle, looking towards Black Combe

Highest point
- Elevation: 305 m (1,001 ft)
- Prominence: c. 30 m
- Listing: Outlying Wainwright
- Coordinates: 54°18′51″N 3°12′44″W

Geography
- Location within the Lake District
- Location: Cumbria, England
- Parent range: Lake District
- OS grid: SD211916

Great Stickle is a fell located in the southern Lake District of England with an altitude of 305 m (1,001 ft). Alfred Wainwright included it in the Stickle Pike chapter of his "The Outlying Fells of Lakeland" (but stated the height incorrectly as 990 ft; the 2011 2nd edition has the correct figure). Geographically the fell is located on the southern ridge of Stickle Pike and is located between the lower Duddon Valley (west) and the valley of Dunnerdale Beck (east). A "stickle" is a hill with a prominent rocky top.

The fell is rugged in appearance with several craggy outcrops that are found especially on its summit and its southern slopes which descend to the hamlet of Broughton Mills. It is generally climbed in combination with Stickle Pike, the ridge between the two summits offering an interesting traverse and excellent views to the Furness Peninsula and the southern fells.
