= Yew Tree Tarn =

Lake in the English Lake District

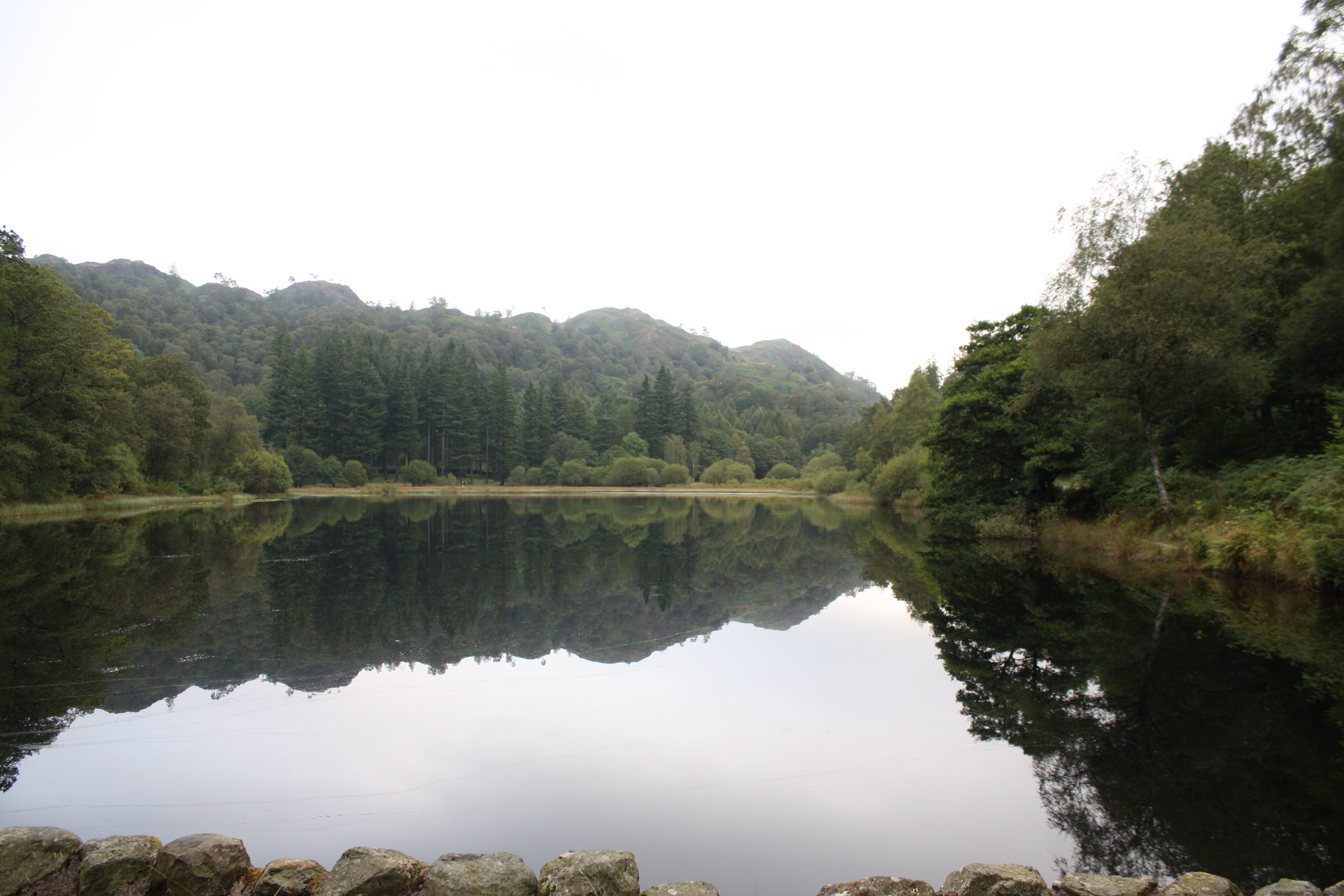
- Yew Tree Tarn, Cumbria

- Location in the Lake District National Park Location in South Lakeland, Cumbria
- Location: Lake District, England
- Coordinates: 54°23′43″N 3°02′46″W
- Lake type: dammed enclosure
- Primary inflows: Yewdale Beck
- Primary outflows: Yewdale Beck
- Basin countries: United Kingdom
- Average depth: 10 ft (3.0 m)
- Surface elevation: 344 ft (105 m)

Yew Tree Tarn is a small lake in the English Lake District situated in between the towns of Ambleside and Coniston. The tarn was formed when the local landowner dammed the Yewdale Beck in the 1930s and stocked the lake with trout. Currently, fishing for brown and rainbow trout is controlled and managed by the Coniston and Torver Angling Association. A usable footpath runs around the periphery of the tarn not bordered by the main road.

In July 2010, volunteers from the South Lakes Rivers Trust and the Coniston and Crake Partnership removed most of the fish from the tarn in order to avoid kill off from low water levels due to a local drought. The fish were moved to the nearby beck.
