= Chris Jesty =

British author and cartographer (born 1942)

Chris Jesty (born 1942) is a British author and cartographer who revised Alfred Wainwright's Pictorial Guide to the Lakeland Fells to produce the second edition (2005–2009) of the books, which were originally published in 1955–1966. He used GPS to survey all the routes and the work involved 3,000 hand-drawn changes in the first volume alone, reflecting changes such as walls having fallen down or a quarry being opened on the line of a footpath, and adding information such as car parking.

Jesty had earlier lived in Dolgellau, north Wales, and in the 1970s produced and published a panorama of the view from Snowdon, available as a single sheet or in four sections. In 1978 he published a panorama of the view from Scafell Pike with illustrations by Wainwright. He then moved to Bridport in Dorset, where he wrote several books about that area before moving to Kendal in Cumbria.

In 1979, he wrote to Wainwright offering to update the guides, but Wainwright replied that he did not want this done in his lifetime. In 1989, Wainwright agreed that Jesty could update the guides, but after his death in 1991, when Jesty had worked on the project for 18 months, the guides were sold to Michael Joseph publishers who were not interested in the updates. Some time later the guides were transferred to Frances Lincoln Publishers and the decision was made to produce new editions, not only of the Pictorial Guide but also of several of Wainwright's other walking guides. The last two of these were published in April 2014. The publishers have announced that Clive Hutchby is working on the third edition of the Pictorial Guide, with the first volume, The Eastern Fells published in March 2015, followed by The Far Eastern Fells in October 2015.

== Publications ==
=== Revised editions of Alfred Wainwright's works ===
All published by Frances Lincoln Publishers.

- Pennine Way Companion, revised edition, 2004 ISBN 9780711222359
- Pictorial Guide to the Lakeland Fells, 7 vols, 2nd edition, 2005–2009 ISBN 9780711232716 (boxed set – also available individually)
- Wainwright: The Podcasts Eight Lakeland Walks with Wainwright, 2008 ISBN 9780711229846
- A Coast to Coast Walk, 2nd edition, 2010 ISBN 9780711230637
- Wainwright's TV Walks, 2nd edition, 2010 ISBN 9780711231214
- The Best of Wainwright, edited by Hunter Davies, 2nd edition, ISBN 9780711231108
- The Outlying Fells of Lakeland, 2nd edition, 2011 ISBN 9780711231757
- Pennine Way Companion, 2nd edition, September 2012 ISBN 9780711233683
- Walks in Limestone Country: The Whernside, Ingleborough and Penyghent areas of Yorkshire, 2nd edition, April 2014 ISBN 978-0711234864
- Walks on the Howgill Fells: and Adjoining Fells , 2nd edition, April 2014 ISBN 978-0711234871

=== Other works include ===
- A Guide to the Isle of Purbeck, Wimborne: Dovecote, 1984 ISBN 0946159203
- Dorset Town Trails, Wimborne: Roy Gasson, 1985 ISBN 0948495030
- A Guide to the West Dorset Countryside, Wimborne: Dovecote, 1986 ISBN 094615936X
- East Anglian Town Trails, London: Hale, 1989 ISBN 0709035675
- Exploring Dorset by Car, Wimborne: Dovecote, 1990 ISBN 0946159742

"Happy Memories" (autobiography), 2018 ISBN 9781912014101
