= Fell =

High and barren landscape feature

Fell
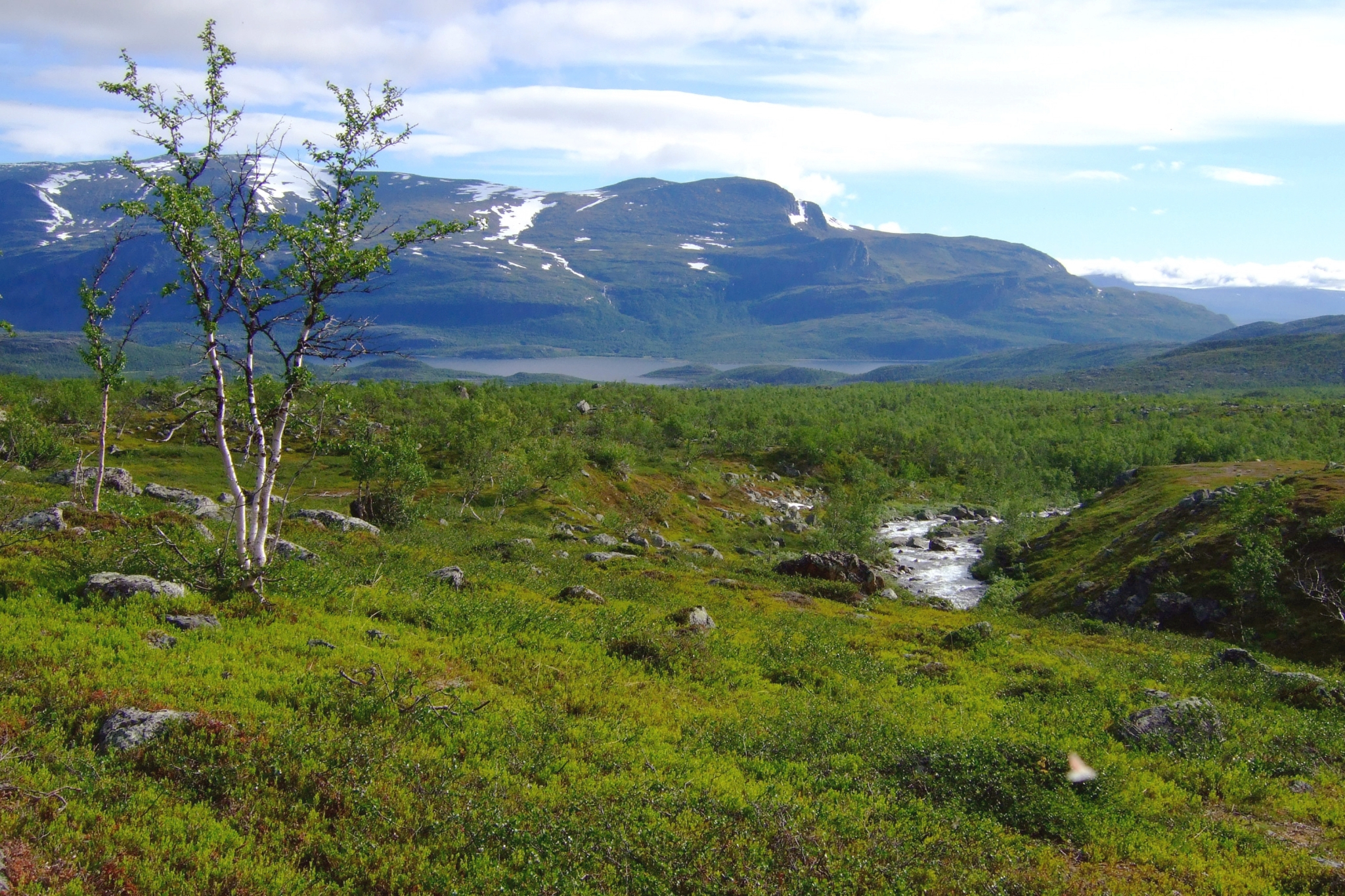
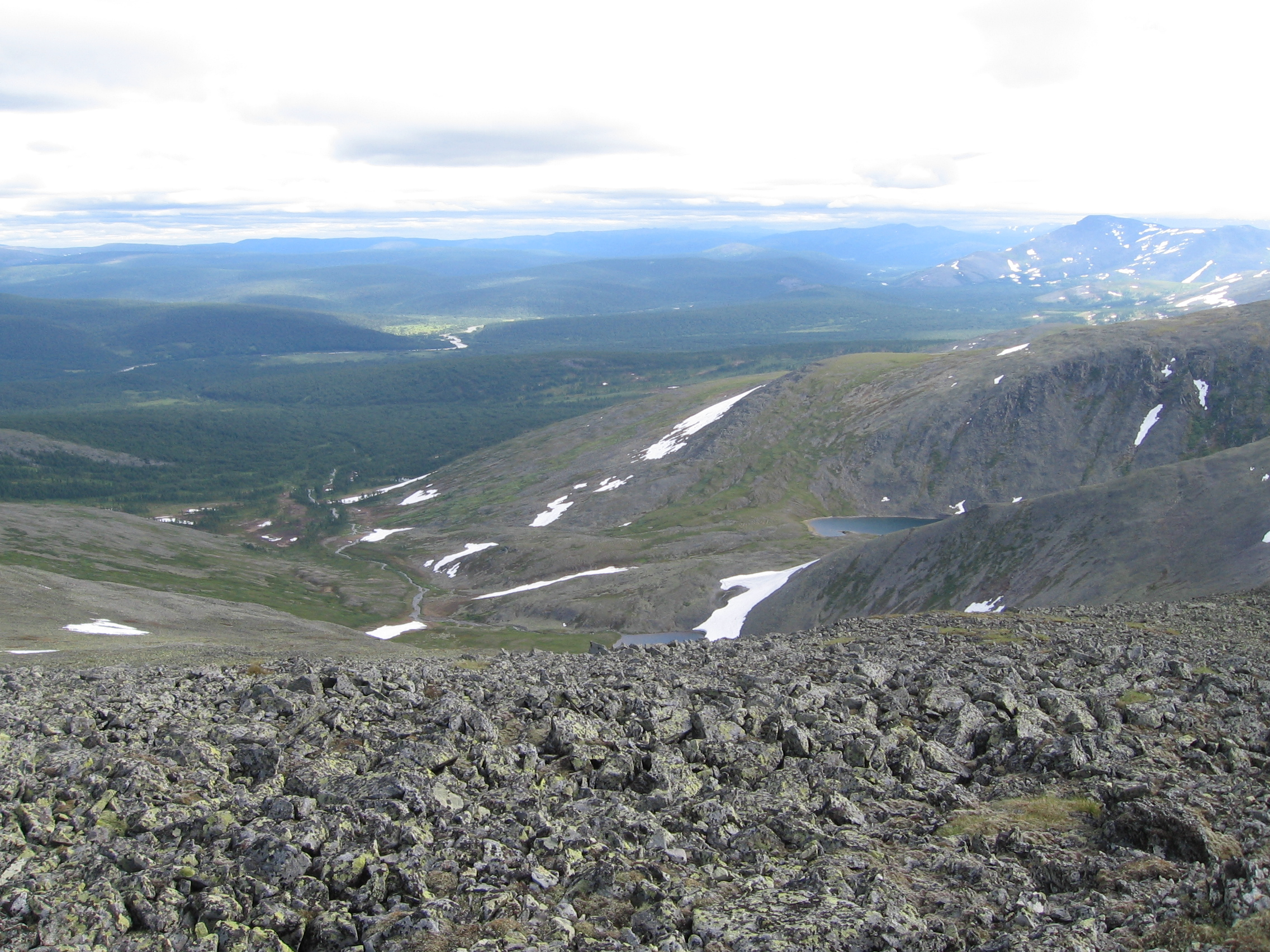
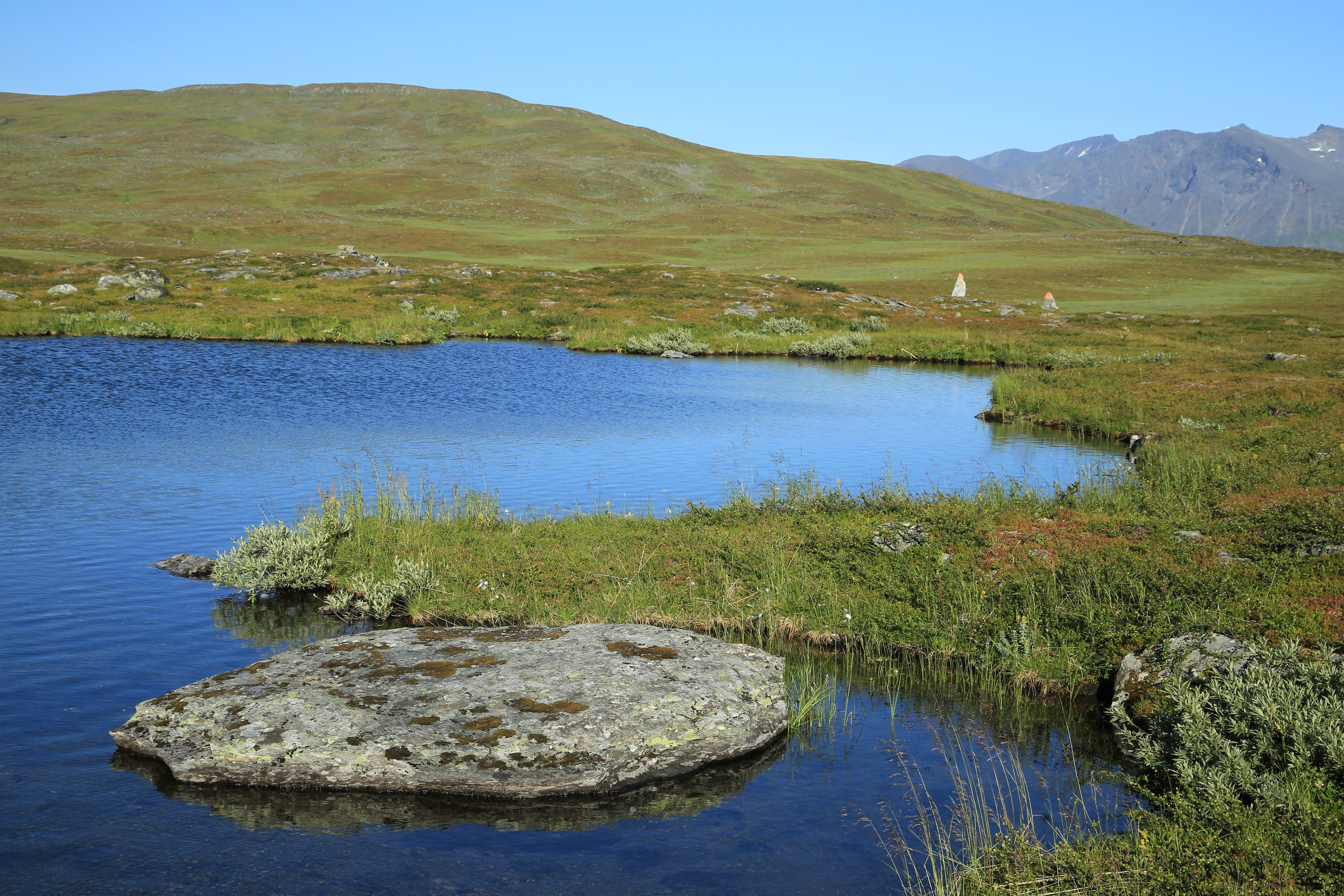
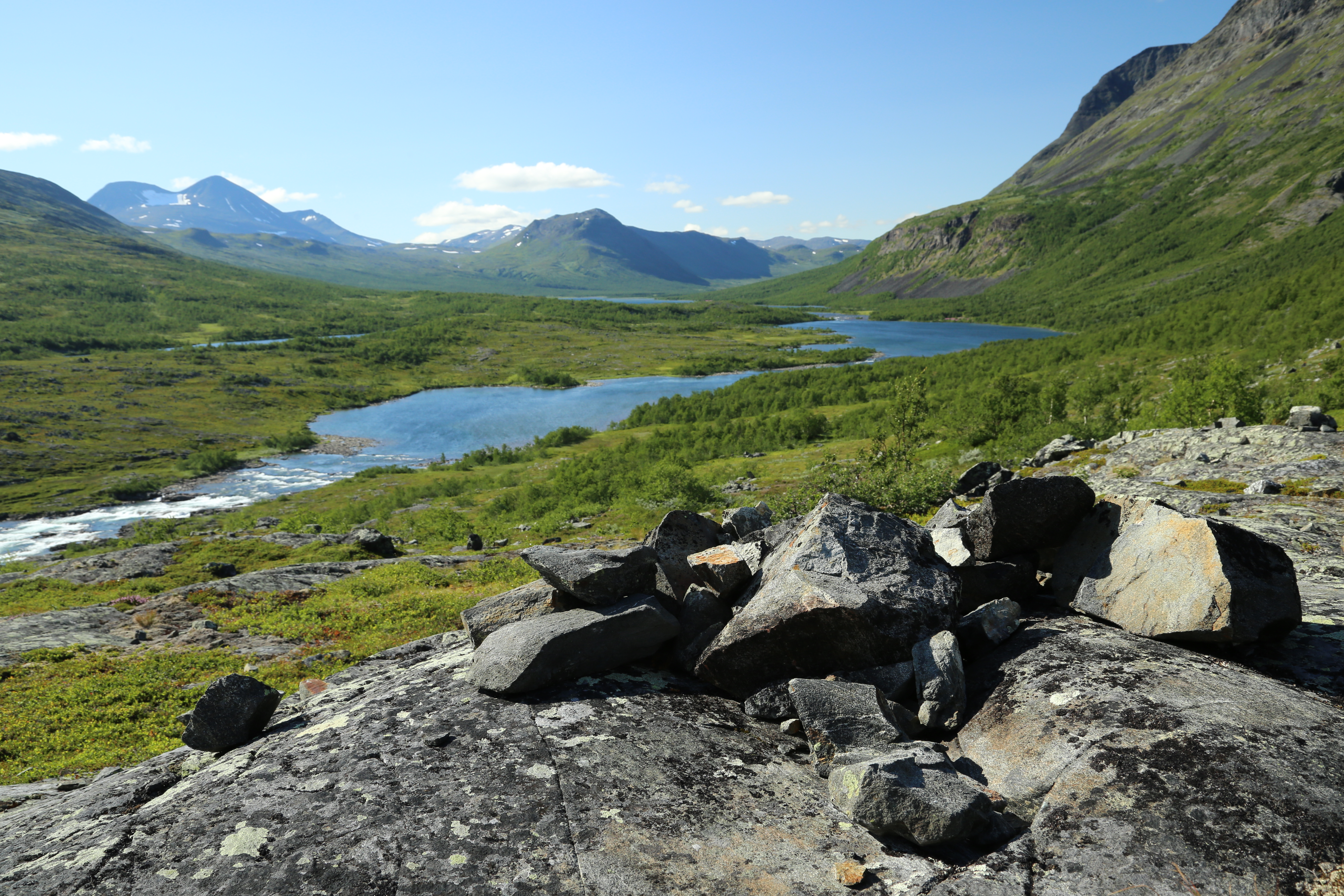
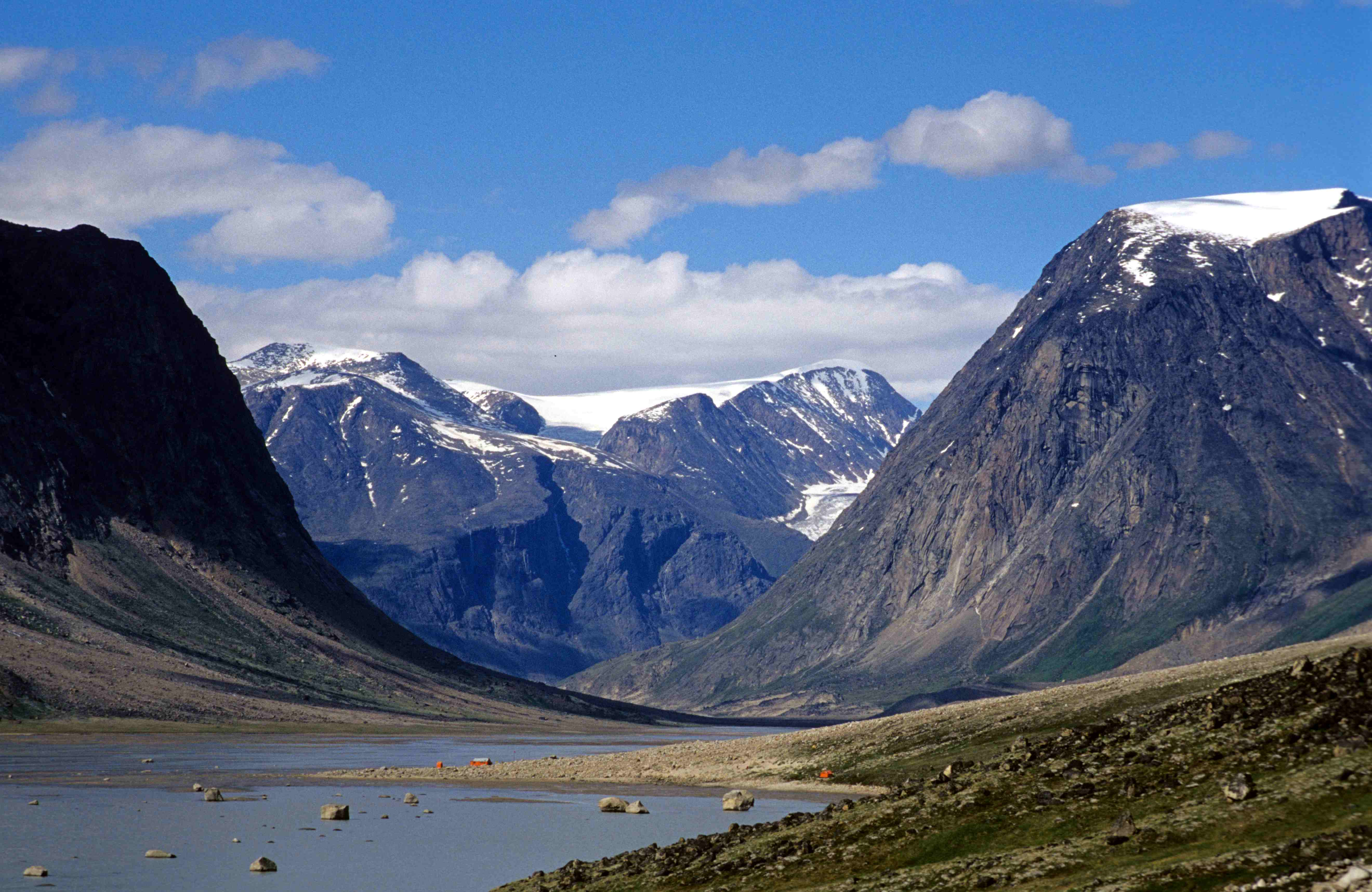
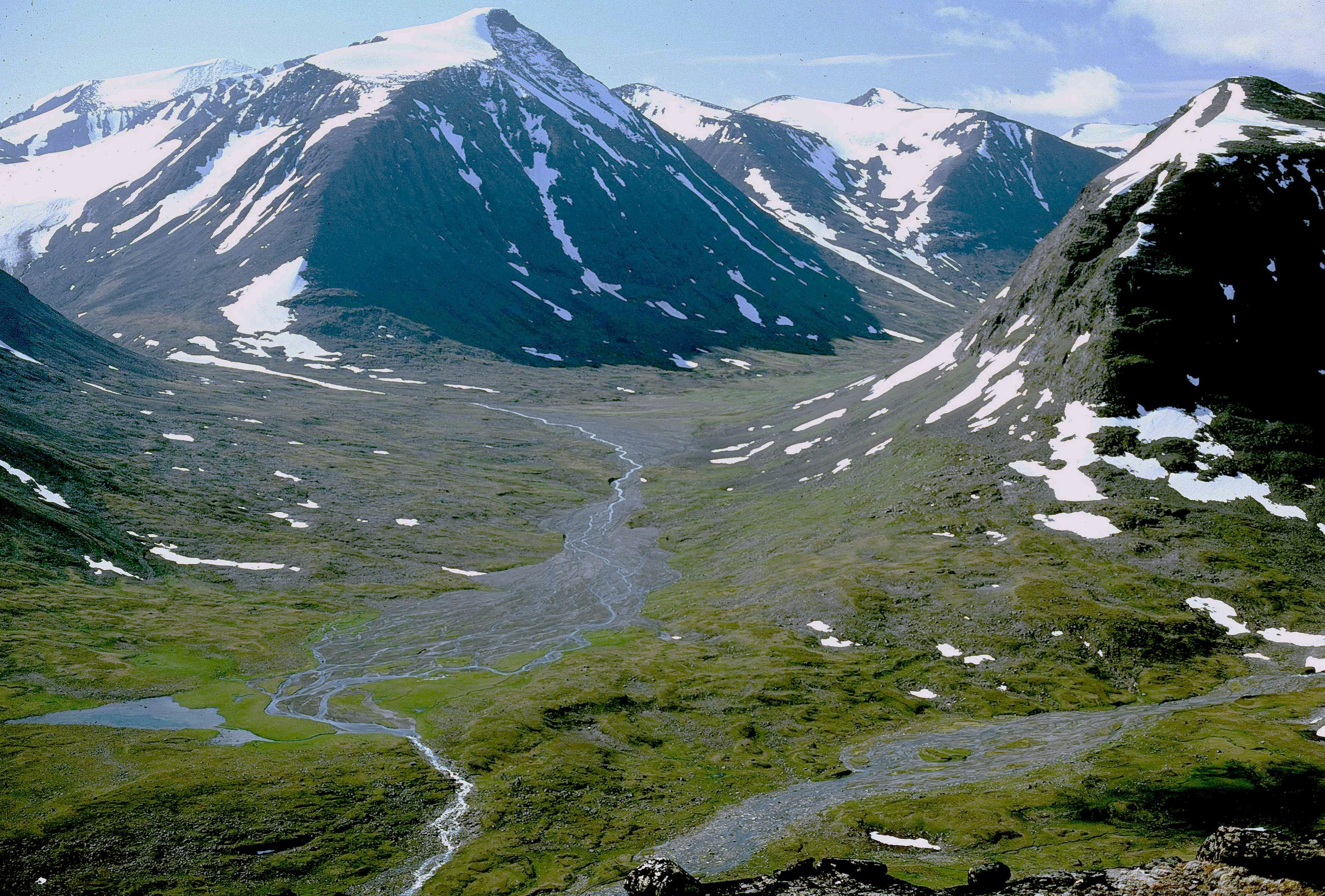
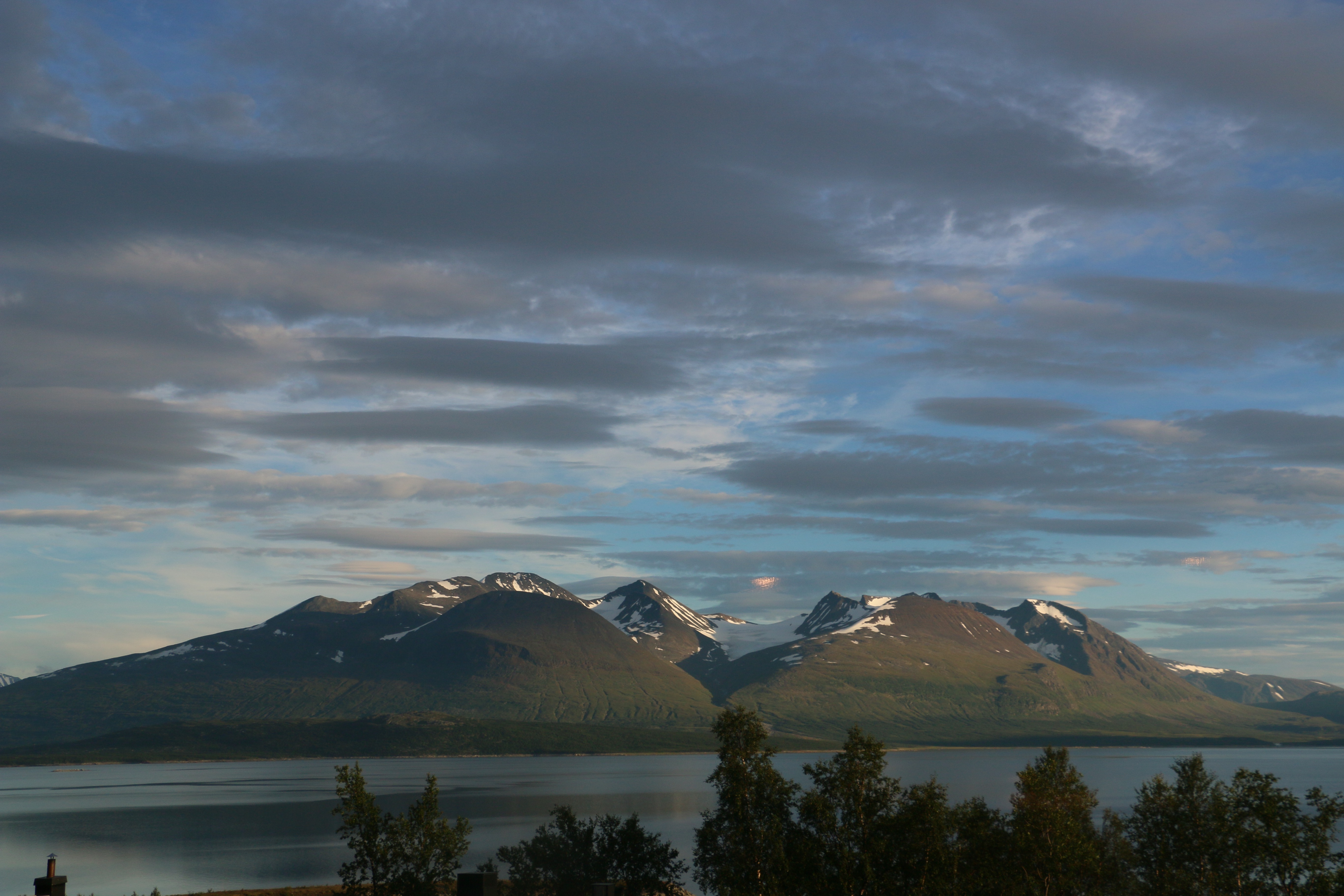
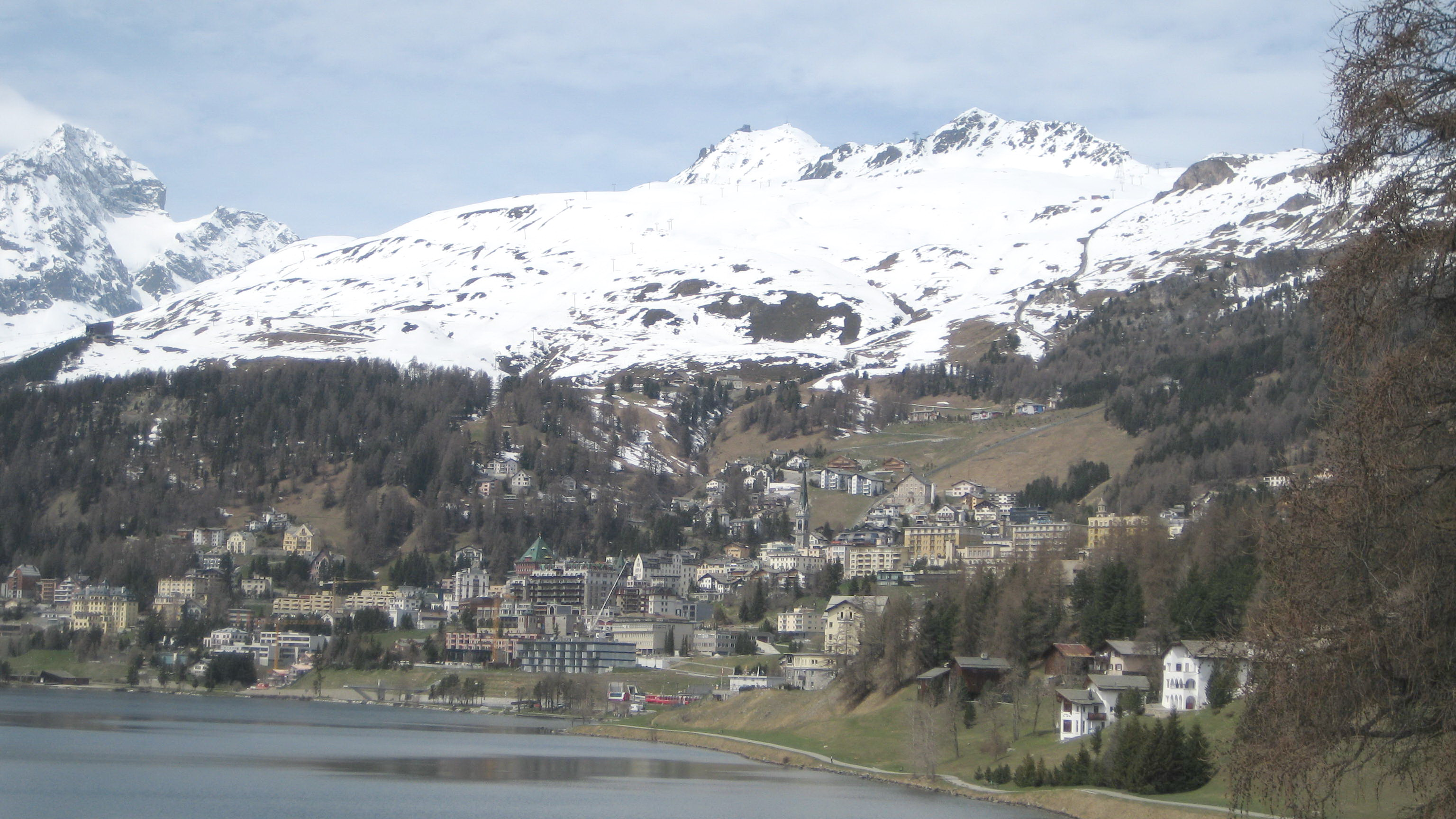
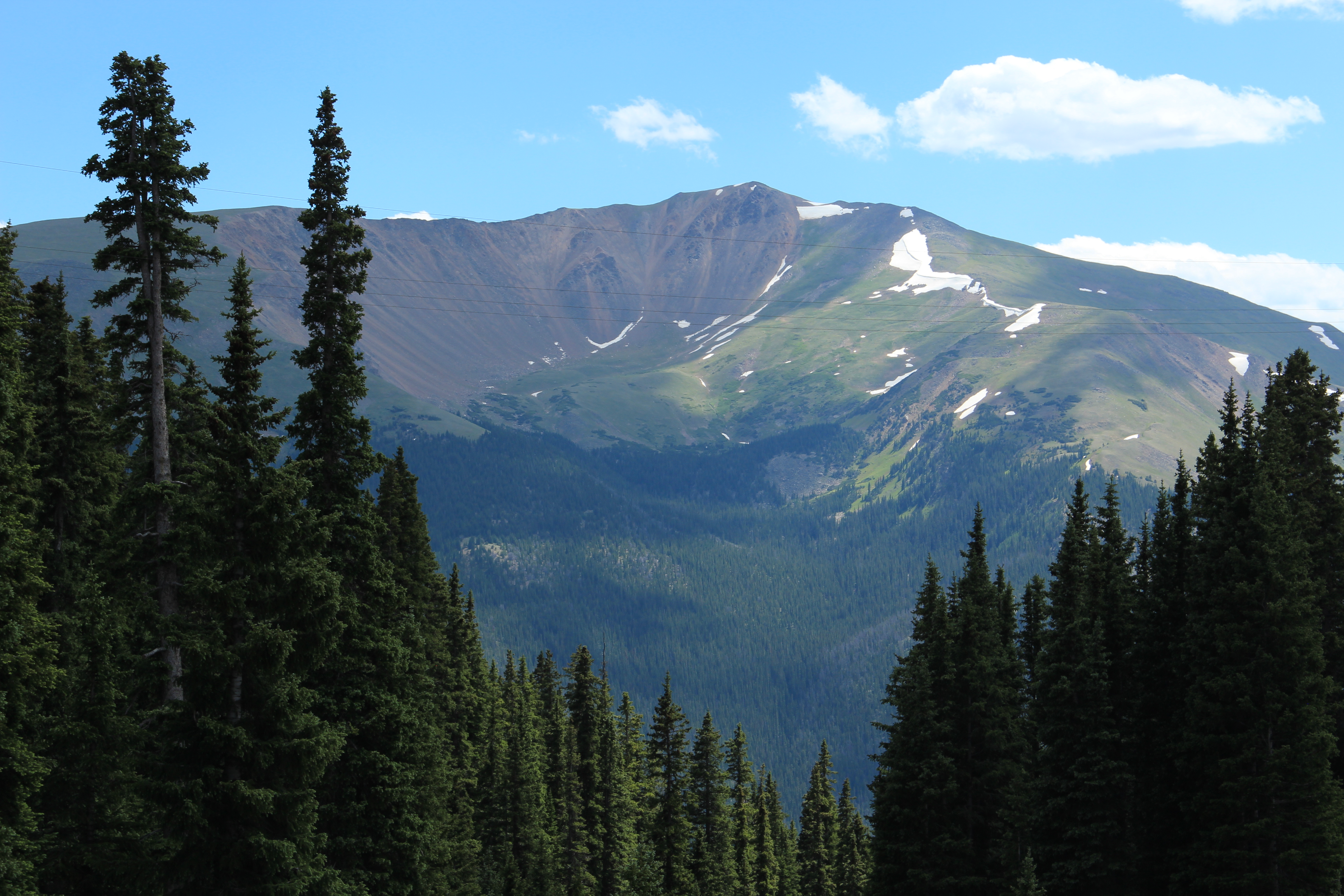
- Top left: Stora Sjöfallet National Park, Sweden
- Top center: Ural Mountains, Russia
- Top right: Nordkalottruta, Norrbotten, Sweden
- Mid left: Stora Sjöfallet National Park, Sweden
- Mid center: Auyuittuq National Park, Canada
- Mid right: Sarek National Park, Sweden
- Bottom left: Ural Mountains, Russia
- Bottom center: Fell above St. Moritz, Switzerland
- Bottom right: Berthoud Pass, Colorado

A fell (from Old Norse: fell, "mountain → landscape over the tree line"; cf. Icelandic: fell, Norwegian: fjell, Swedish: fjäll) is a high and barren landscape feature, such as a mountain or moor-covered hill, often mountain landscape over the tree line, etc. The term is most often employed in Fennoscandia, Iceland, the Isle of Man, parts of northern England, and Scotland.

== Etymology ==
The English word "fell", including Scots fell, comes from Old Norse fell (in Middle English fell, felle) with the same or similar meaning as its descendants. Its root meaning is "mountain", especially steep mountain, however, its descendants in English and Swedish, both independently refer to "open mountain landscapes" of similar nature, indicating a common ancestral sense. Old Swedish sources often use the word in regards to high mountains or the Scandinavian Mountains, and in later Swedish the given base definition is "landscape above the tree line", etc. The 1956 Scottish National Dictionary gives the definitions for fell in both Scots and dialectal English during the 18th–19th century as: "a hill, especially a rocky, rather precipitous hill (1808); a tract of hill-moor; a level piece of ground on the side or top of a hill (1825, Perthshire)".

Scots forms found in place-names includes: Shetlandic fiel and field, and Orcadian fiold. The Orcadian form fiold is also found independently as "a hill; upland pasturage" (1887), especially in Rousay (1942). These probably stem from a Norn form akin to *fiel but may have intermixed with English "field", as given for the Danish cognate fjeld in the dictionary Den Danske Ordbog, or an Old Norse analog, etc. The Norse cognate to English "field" is listed in the Swedish Academy's dictionary (SAOB) as Old Swedish fiælder (Old Norse: *fieldr), to the stem fiæll-, modern Swedish: fjäll, meaning "plot, divided piece of land".

Other Old Norse forms include: fjall and fiæl. Inherited forms include: Danish: fjeld, fjæld; Faroese: fjall, fjøll; Icelandic: fjall, fell; Norwegian: fjell, with Norwegian dialects: fjøll, fjødd, fjedd, fjedl, fjill, fil(l), and fel; and Swedish: fjäll; all referring to mountains rising above the tree line and the corresponding nature, etc.

== Types ==
Fells can be divided into various types based on various arbitrary parameters. In Swedish, fells are commonly divided into high, low and fore fell based on elevation properties.

=== High fell ===
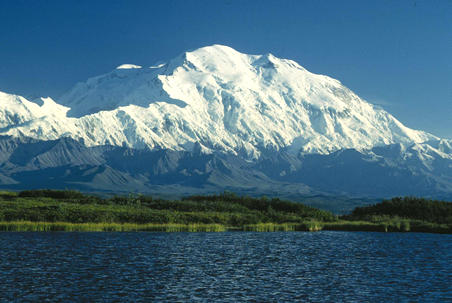
The snow line on Denali, Alaska, United States

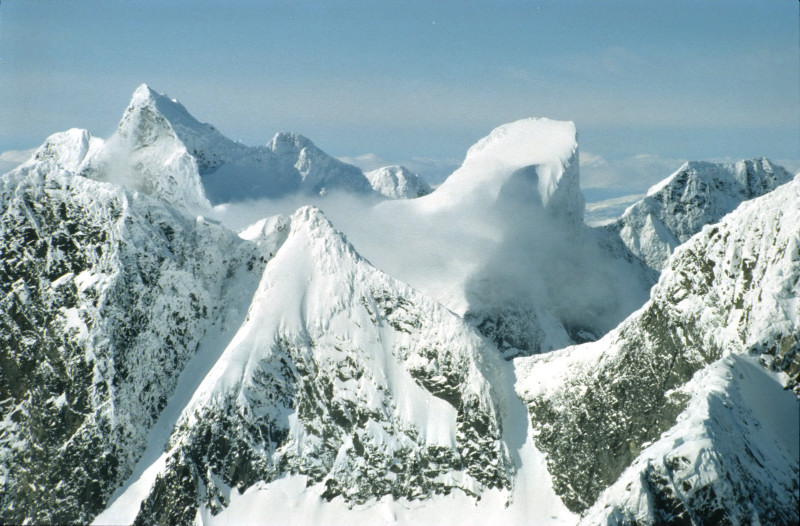
Hurrungane high fell mountain range, Norway

High fell (Swedish: högfjäll) denotes fell above the snow line (at least 1,200 m (3,900 ft) above sea level). Such areas usually feature significant elevation differences, sharp peaks, glaciers, snow, and bare mountain devoid of vegetation due to moraine not having been deposited there by the ice sheet. These areas are usually crossed by U-shaped valleys.

High fell is covered with snow for most of the year and may even receive snowfall during the summer, which, if there is a lot of snowfall, sometimes leads to the snow not having time to melt during the summer, which over time forms glaciers due to the constant build up of snow. These glaciers may be 30 meters thick and consist of compressed ice. While not always covered in glaciers, high fell is characterized by such, and glaciers have a major impact on how the shape of the high mountains changes over time.

The term is recorded as early as the 15th century (1460-1480), as Old Swedish høghfiæl, denoted as "high mountain or fell" (Latin: alpis vel alpes).

=== Low fell ===
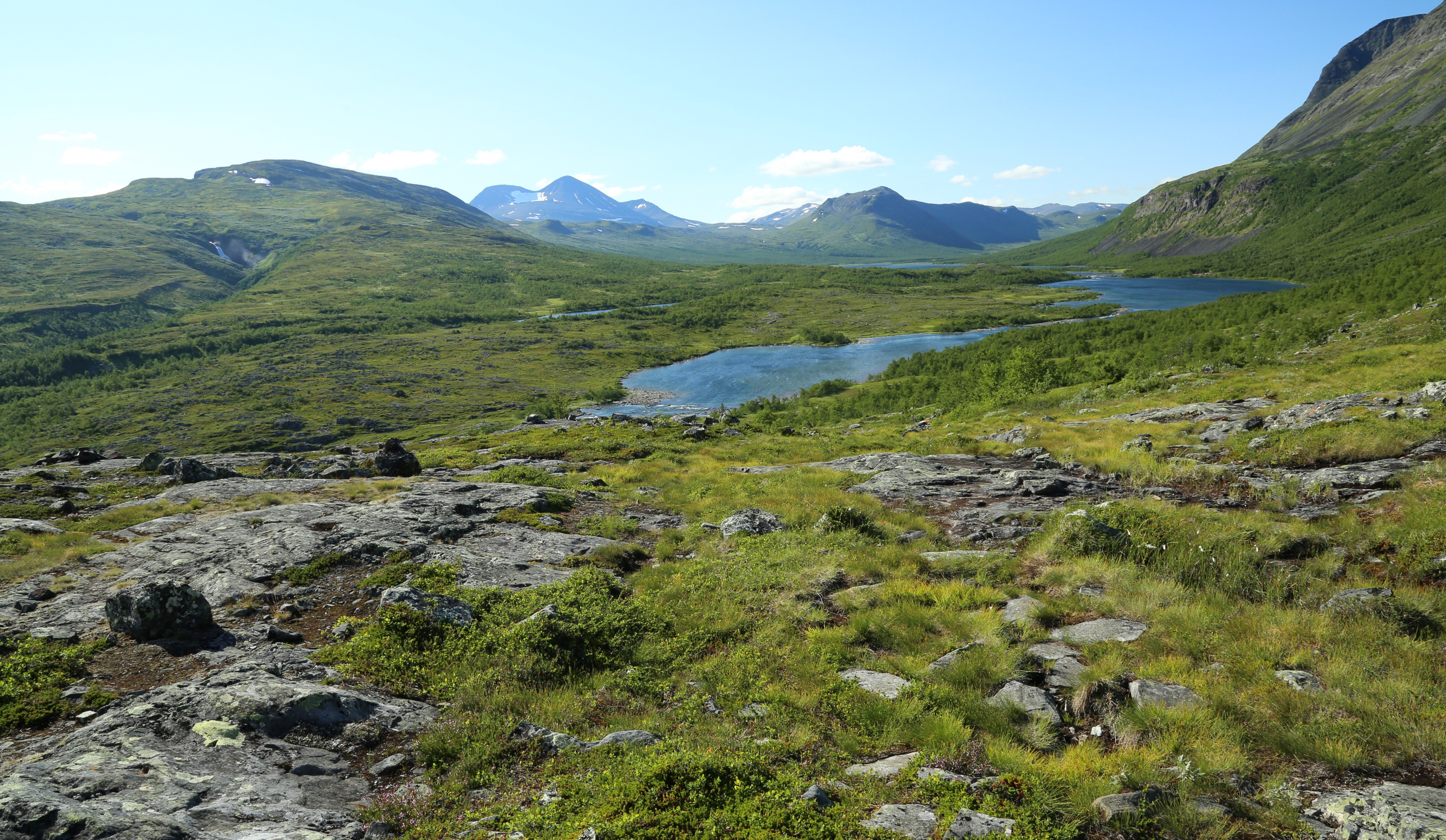
Low fell landscape in Padjelanta, Swedish Lapland

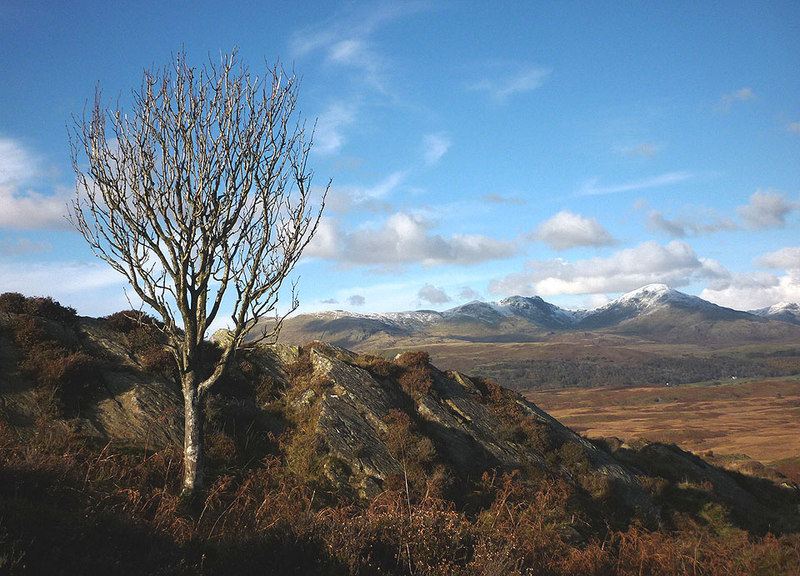
Low fell landscape, Beacon Fell, Cumbria

Low fell (Swedish: lågfjäll) denotes fell below the snow line (<1,200 m (3,900 ft) above sea level) but above the tree line. It is the most common type of fell and may cover very extensive areas, often made up of undulating mountain plains. These are sometimes devoid of vegetation due to moraine not having been deposited there by the ice sheet.

Low fell rarely have glaciers, however, they may occur under certain conditions.

=== Fore fell ===
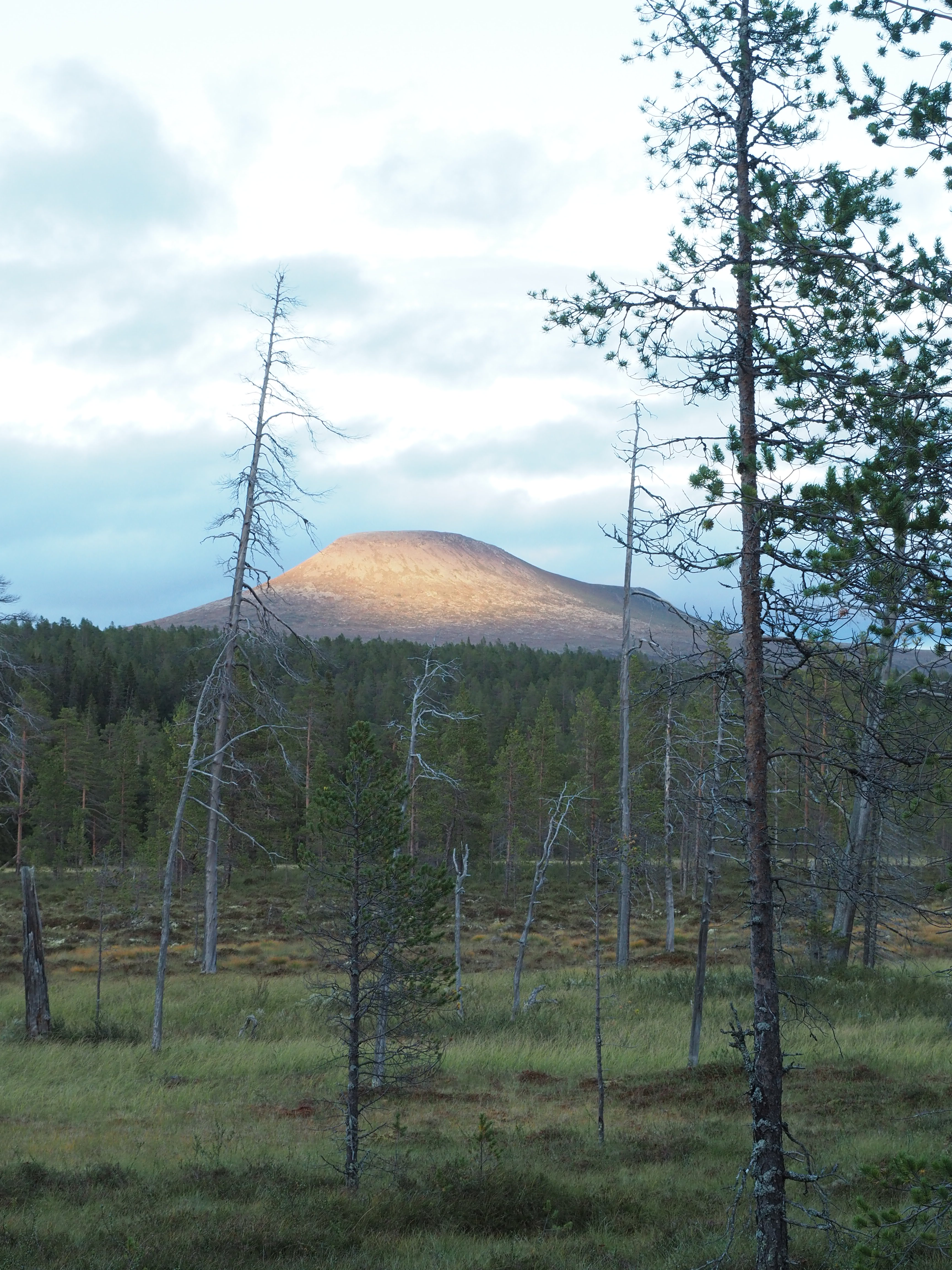
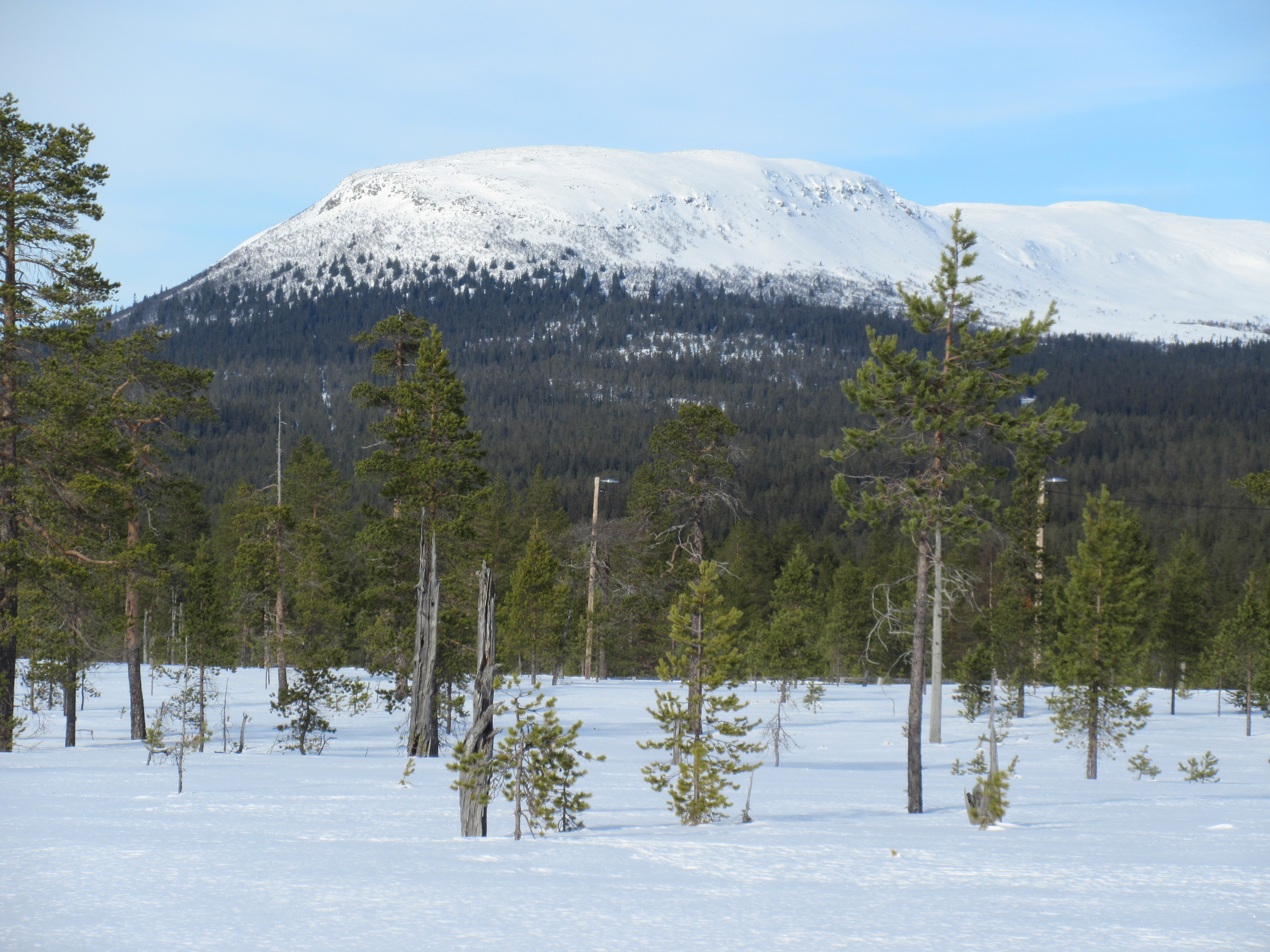
Fore fell up and around the mountain Städjan in Dalarna, Sweden

Fore fell (Swedish: förfjäll) denotes the corresponding nature below and in the fell tree line. Fore fell areas are characterized by large flat areas and numerous and large bogs. The flat bedrock surfaces, which often dominate these areas, prevent rapid water runoff and provide conditions for a high groundwater level and extensive bog formation.

Intrinsically, fell should be above the tree line to be considered fell, which is not the case for fore fell, however, such is still usually included by extension due to their direct affiliation and many similarities to proper fell, both in terms of character and terrain. Fore fell is such that has previously been above the tree line, and thus bare fell proper; however, since the tree line has increased in elevation over time, such have become vegetated, while still being reminiscent of fell.

Generally, fore fell do not surpass 1,000 m (3,300 ft) above the sea level. As a geomorphic unit, fore fell extends across Sweden as a 650 km (400 mi)-long and 40–80 km (25–50 mi)-broad belt from Dalarna in the south to Norrbotten in the north.

== British Isles ==
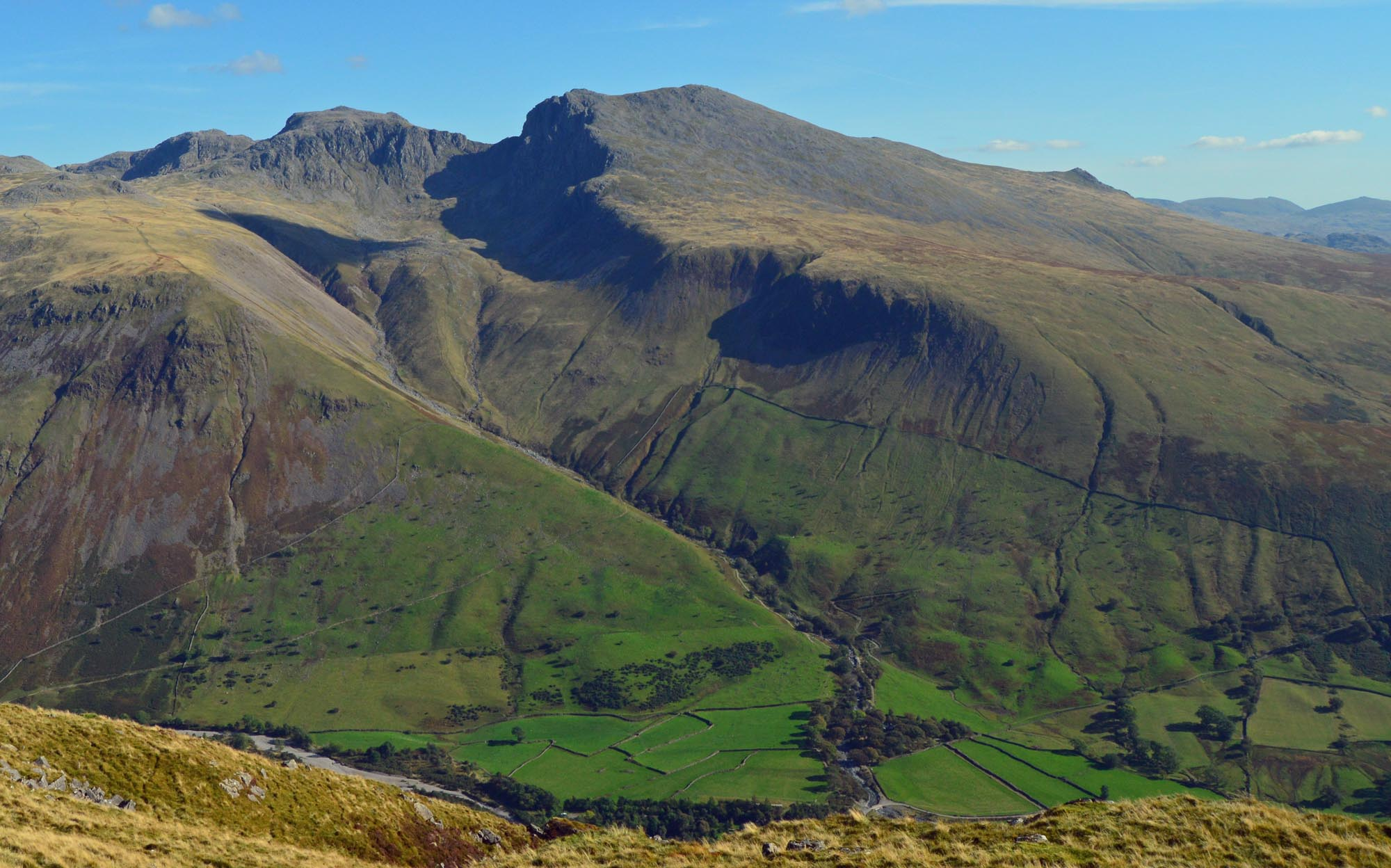
Scafell massif, Yewbarrow, Wasdale, Cumbria. In the valley are older enclosures and higher up on the fell-side are the parliamentary enclosures following straight lines regardless of terrain.

In northern England, especially in the Lake District and in the Pennine Dales, the word "fell" originally referred to an area of uncultivated high ground used as common grazing usually on common land and above the timberline. Today, generally, "fell" refers to the mountains and hills of the Lake District and the Pennine Dales.

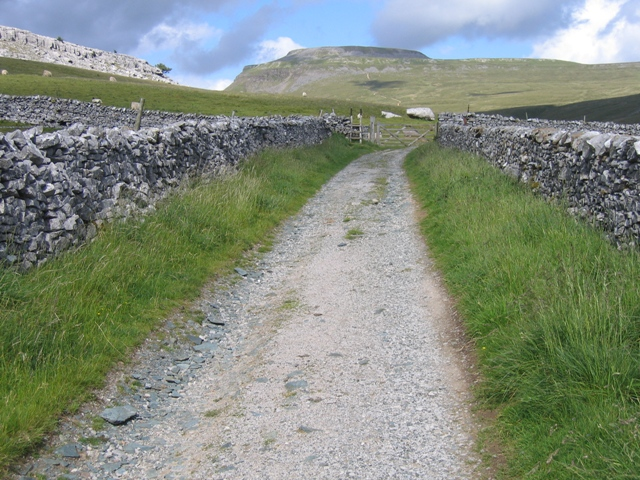
Fell Lane, near Ingleton towards the fellgate and Ingleborough, North Yorkshire, England

Names that originally referred to grazing areas have been applied to these hilltops. This is the case with Seathwaite Fell, for example, which would be the common grazing land used by the farmers of Seathwaite. The fellgate marks the road from a settlement onto the fell (see photograph for example), as is the case with the Seathwaite Fell. In other cases the reverse is true; for instance, the name of Wetherlam, in the Coniston Fells, though understood to refer to the mountain as a whole, strictly speaking refers to the summit; the slopes have names such as Tilberthwaite High Fell, Low Fell and Above Beck Fells.

The word "fell" is also used in the names of various breeds of livestock, bred for life on the uplands, such as Rough Fell sheep, Fell terriers and Fell ponies.

=== Place names ===
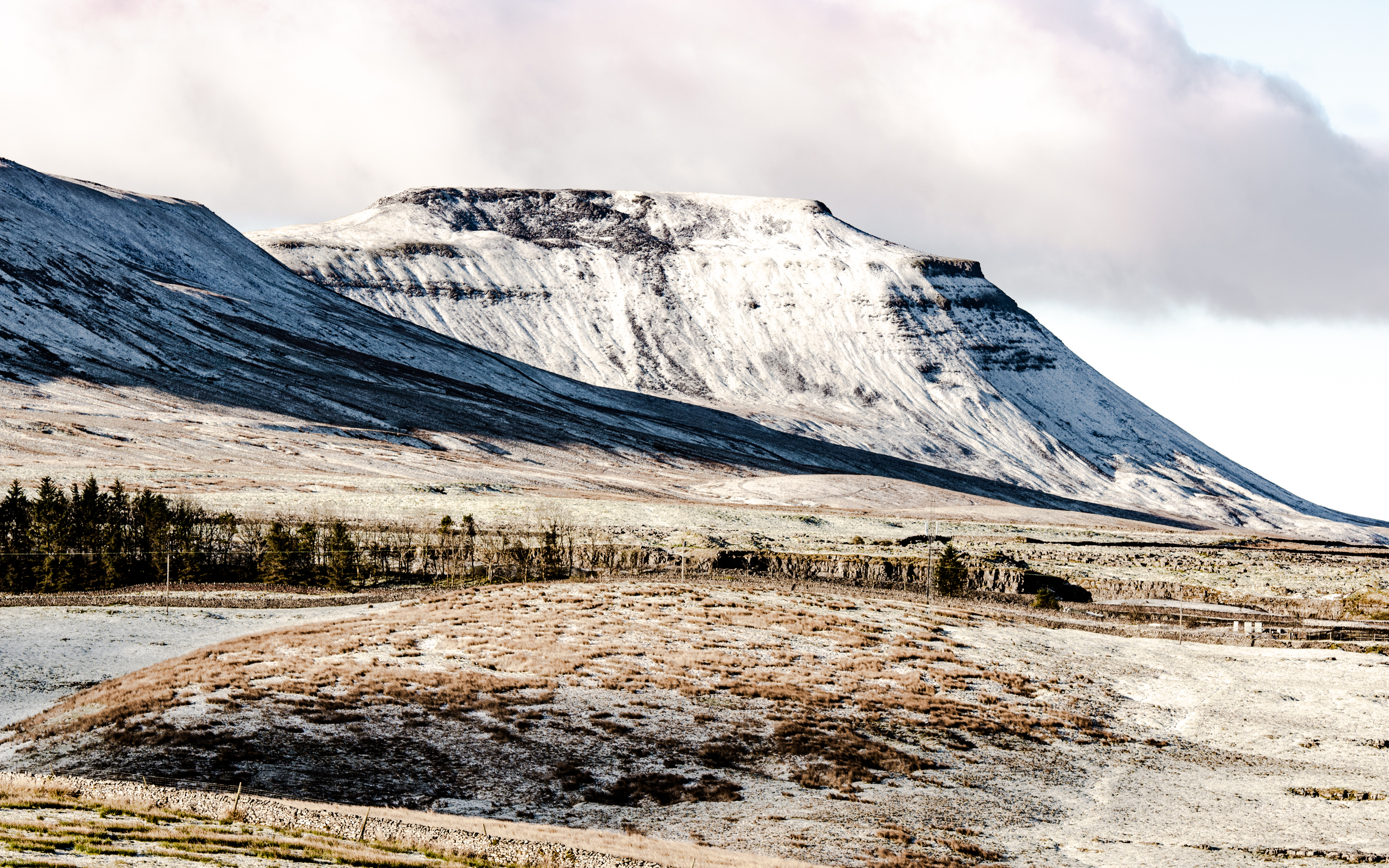
Ingleborough, North Yorkshire, England

Fell is also found in many place names across the north of England, often attached to the name of a community; thus the township of Cartmel Fell. In northern England, there is a Lord of the Fells – this ancient aristocratic title being associated with the Lords of Bowland.

Groups of cairns are a common feature on many fells, often marking the summit – there are fine examples on Wild Boar Fell in Mallerstang Dale, Cumbria, and on Nine Standards Rigg just outside Kirkby Stephen, Cumbria.

There are examples of fells named "Beacon Fell": Beacon Fell, Lancashire and Beacon Fell, Cumbria.

=== Activities ===
As the most mountainous region of England, the Lake District is the area most closely associated with the sport of fell running, which takes its name from the fells of the district. Fellwalking is also the term used locally for the activity known in the rest of Great Britain as hillwalking.

=== Scotland ===
The word "fell" also enjoys limited use in Scotland; with, for example, the Campsie Fells in central Scotland, to the north-east of Glasgow. One of the most famous examples of the use of the word "fell" in Scotland is Goat Fell, the highest point on the Isle of Arran. Criffel and the nearby Long Fell in Galloway may be seen from the northern Lake District of England. Peel Fell in the Kielder Forest is on the border between the Scottish Borders to the north and the English county of Northumberland to the south.

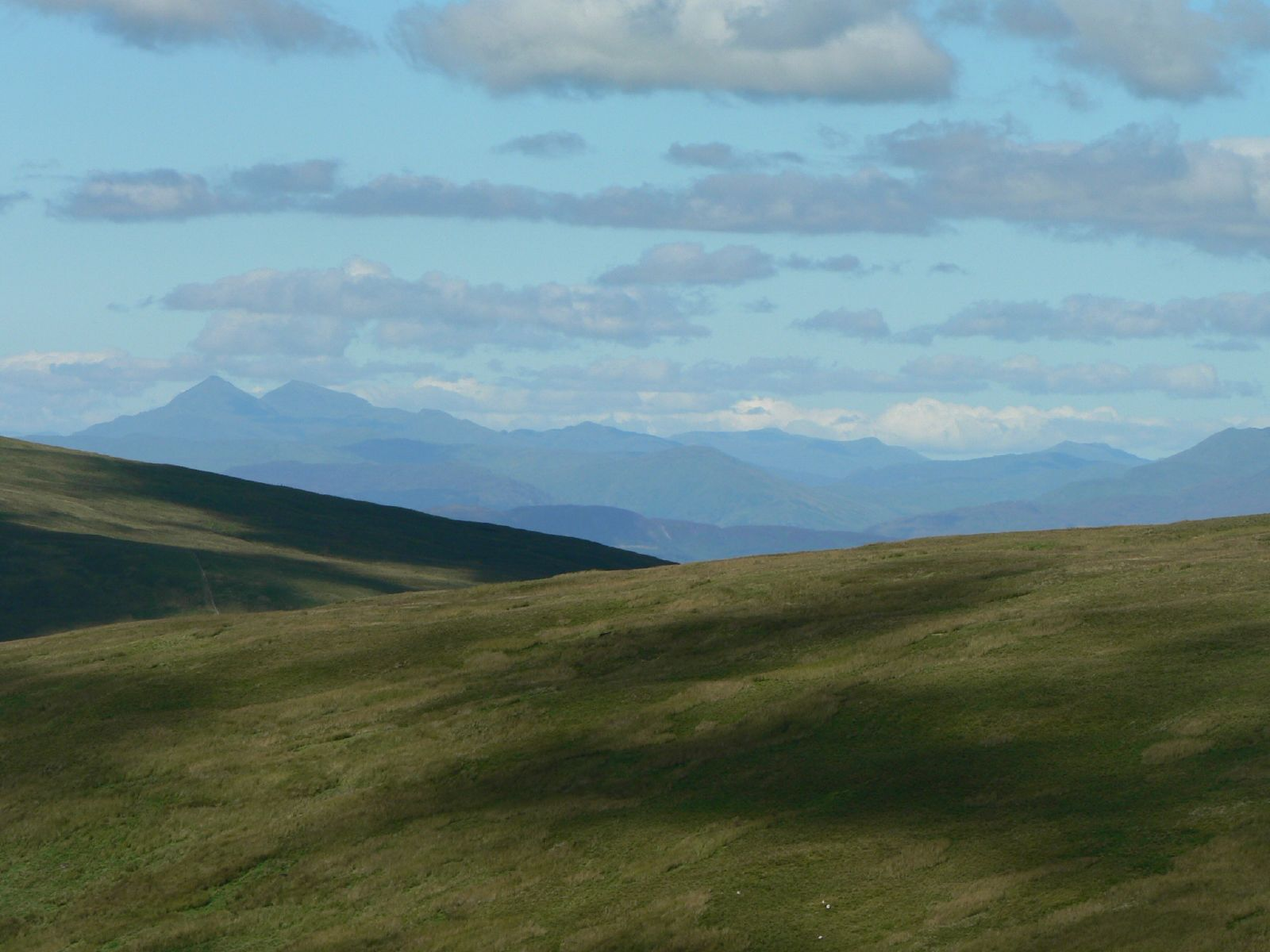
Campsie Fells, north-east of Glasgow, Scotland

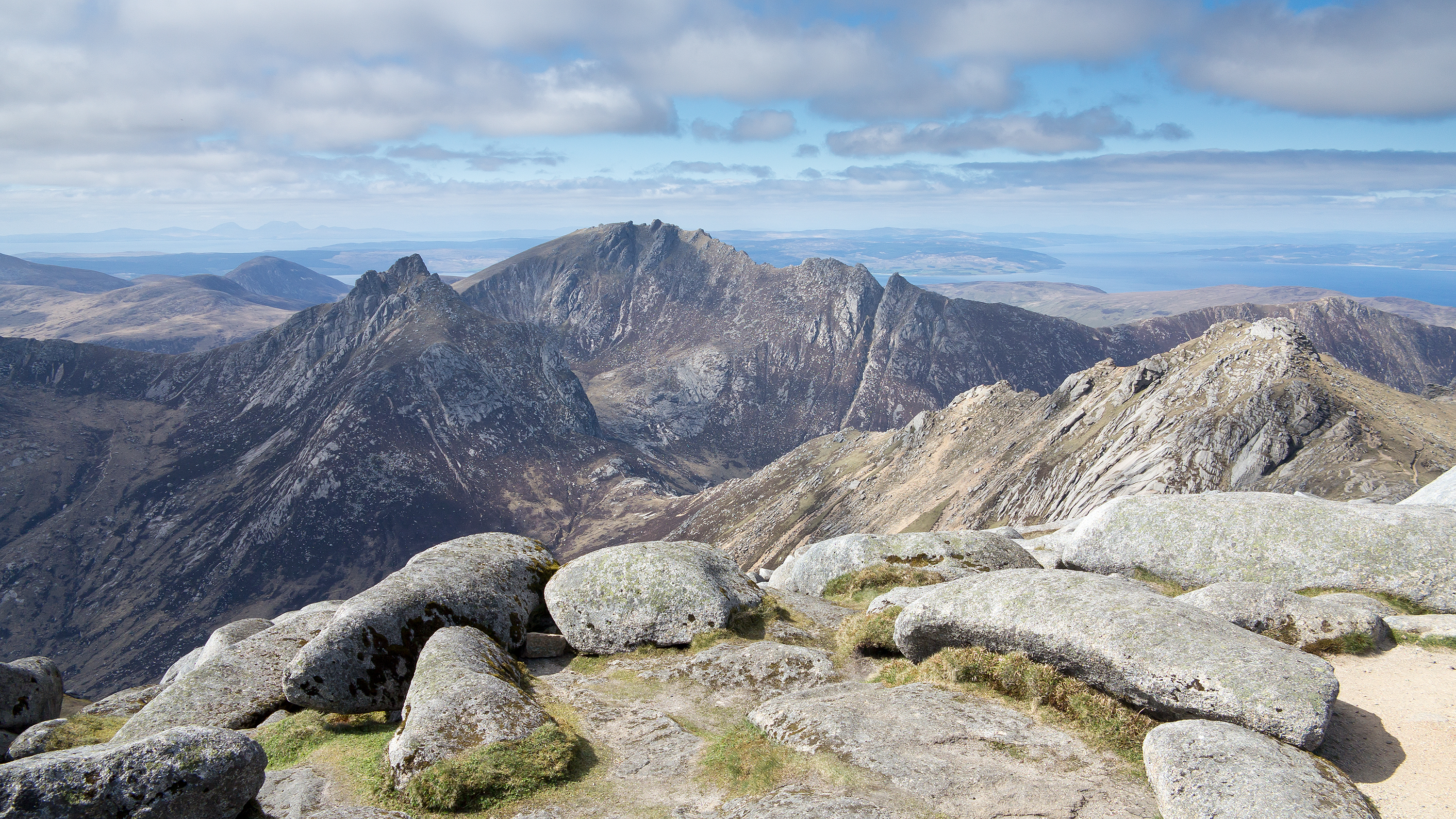
Summit of Goat Fell, Isle of Arran, Scotland

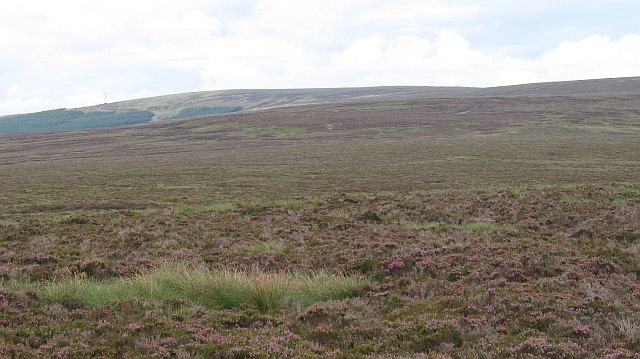
Peel Fell, Kielder Forest, England–Scotland

== Fennoscandia ==
=== Finland ===
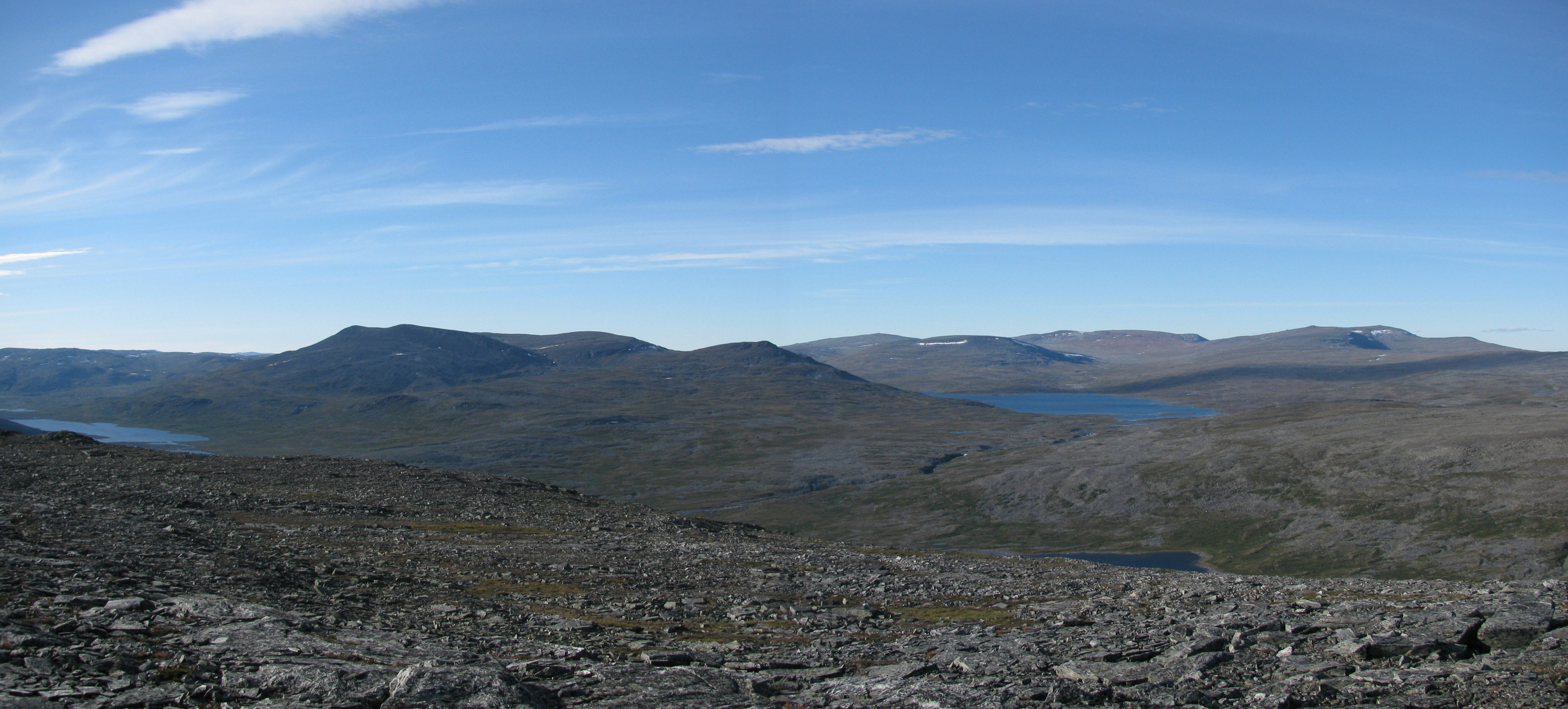
Fells in Finland (including Halti, the highest fell in Finland)

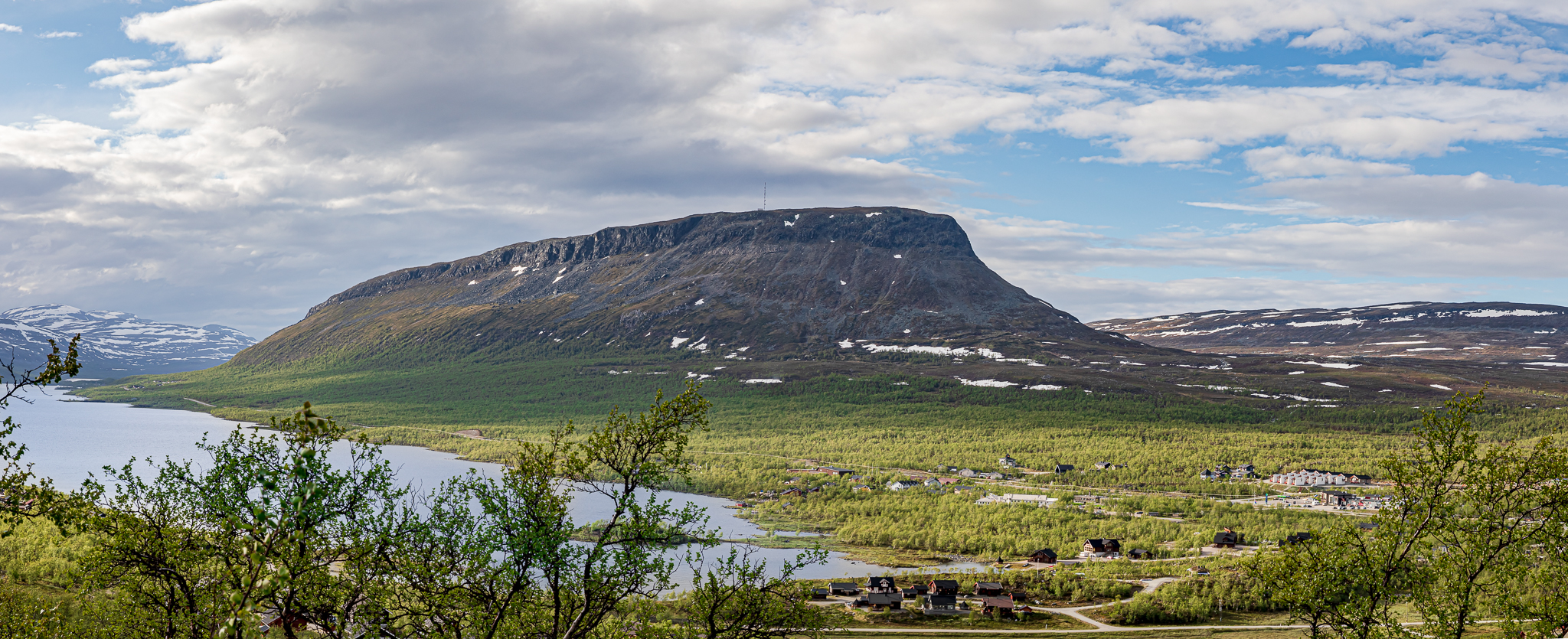
Saana fell located in Kilpisjärvi, Finland

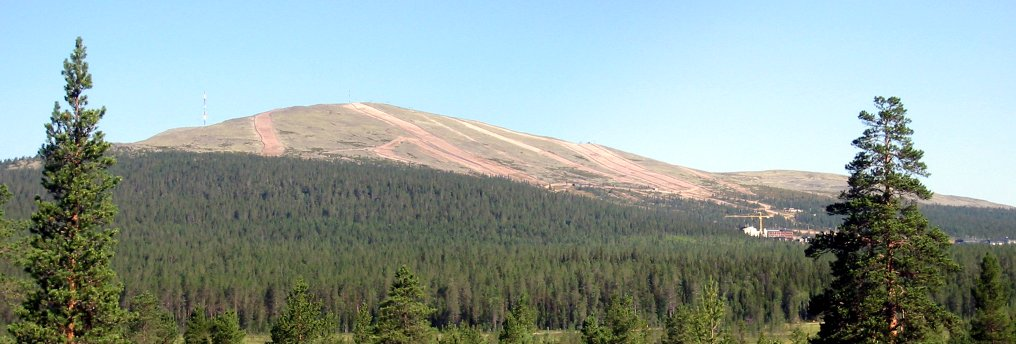
The Ylläs fell in Kolari, Finnish Lapland

In Finnish, the fells are called tunturi (plural: tunturit). A tunturi is a hill high enough that its top is above the tree line and has alpine tundra. In Finnish, the geographical term vuori is used for mountains recently uplifted and with jagged terrain featuring permanent glaciers, while tunturi refers to the old, highly eroded, gently shaped terrain without glaciers, as found in Finland. They are round inselbergs rising from the otherwise flat surroundings. The tree line can be at a rather low altitude, such as 600 m in Enontekiö, owing to the high latitude. The fells in Finnish Lapland form vestiges of the Karelides mountains, formed two billion years ago. The term tunturi is also generally used to refer to treeless plains at high altitudes in far north regions.

The term tunturi, originally a word limited to far-Northern dialects of Finnish and Karelian, is a loan from Sami, compare Proto-Sami *tuontër, South Sami doedtere, Northern Sami duottar, Inari Sami tuodâr "uplands, mountains, tundra", Kildin Sami tūndâr, which means "uplands, treeless mountain tract" and is cognate with Finnish tanner ("hard ground"). From this Sami word, the word "tundra" is borrowed, as well, through the Russian language.

Hills that are over 50 m high, but do not reach the tree line are referred to as vaara, while the general term for hills including hills of 50 m or less is mäki.

In place names, however, tunturi, vaara and vuori are used inconsistently, for example: Rukatunturi is technically a vaara, as it lacks alpine tundra.

=== Norway ===
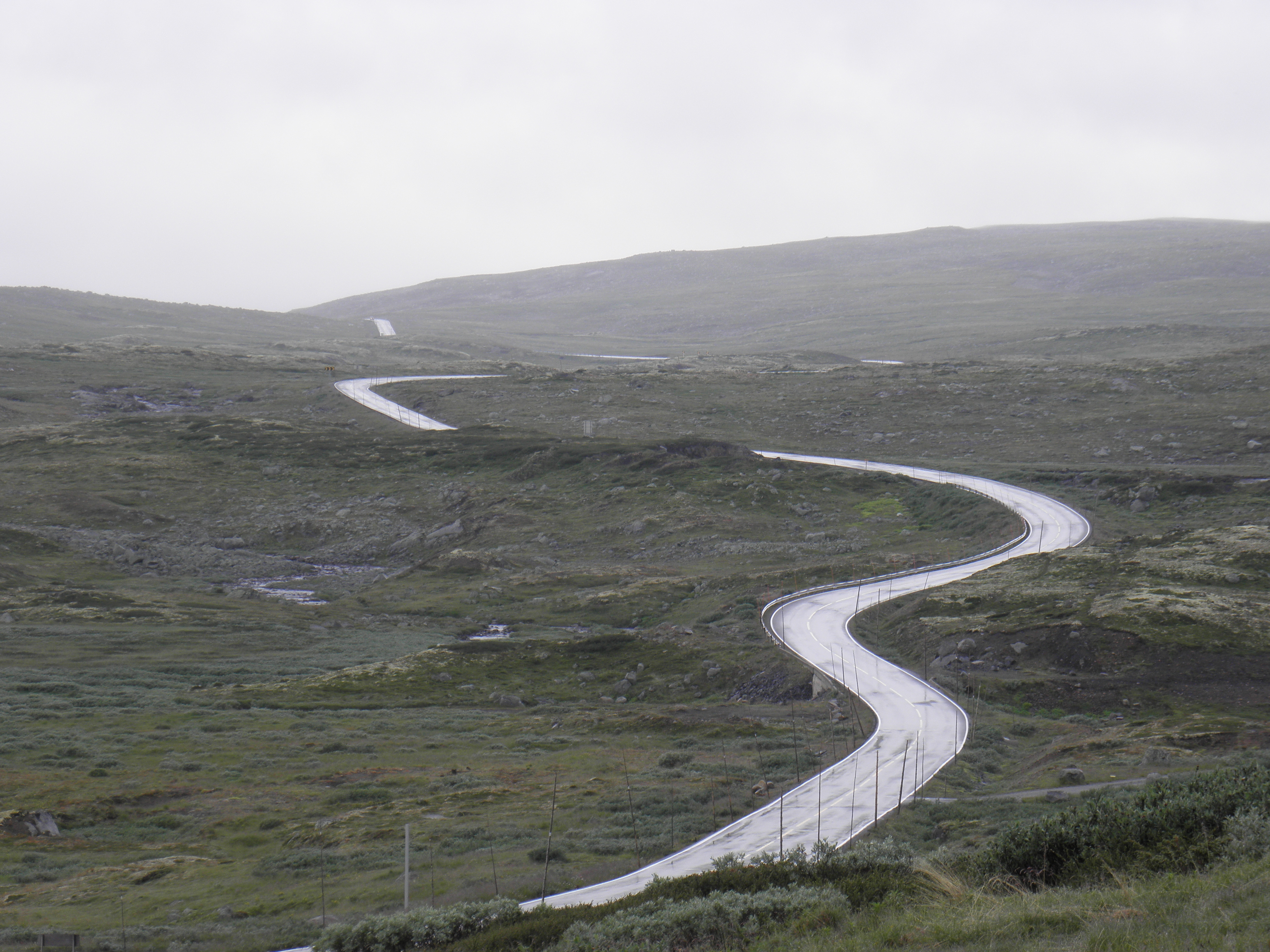
Road across the barren Hardangervidda plateau, Norway.

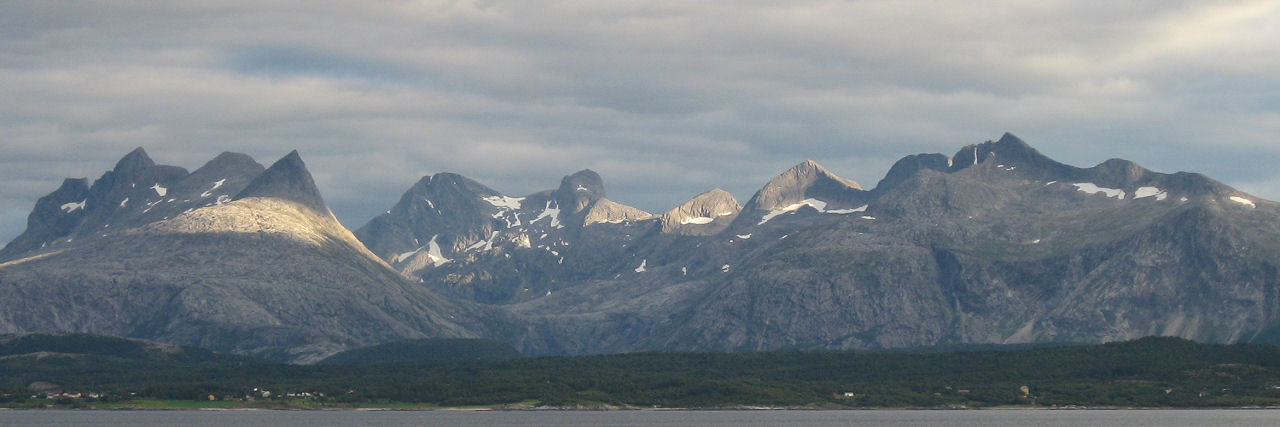
Børvasstindene in Bodø Municipality, Norway

In Norway, fjell, in common usage, is generally interpreted as simply a summit or area of greater altitude than a hill, which leads to a great deal of local variation in what is defined as a fjell. Fjell is mostly used about areas above the forest line. Distinct summits can be referred to as et fjell (a mountain). High plateaus (vidde landscape) such as Hardangervidda are also regarded as fjell. Professor of geography at the University of Bergen, Anders Lundeberg, has summed up the problem by stating, "There simply is no fixed and unambiguous definition of fjell."

Ivar Aasen defined fjell as a "tall berg", primarily referring to a berg that reaches an altitude where trees do not grow, lower berg are referred to as "berg", ås (hill, ridge) or hei (moor, heathland). The fixed expression til fjells refers to mountains (or uplands) as a collective rather than a specific location or specific summit (the "s" in til fjells is an old genitive form remaining only in fixed expressions). According to Ivar Aasen, berg refers to cliffs, bedrock and notable elevations of the surface underpinned by bedrock; berg also refers to the substance of bedrock.

For all practical purposes, fjell can be translated as "mountain" and the Norwegian language has no other commonly used word for mountain.

=== Sweden ===
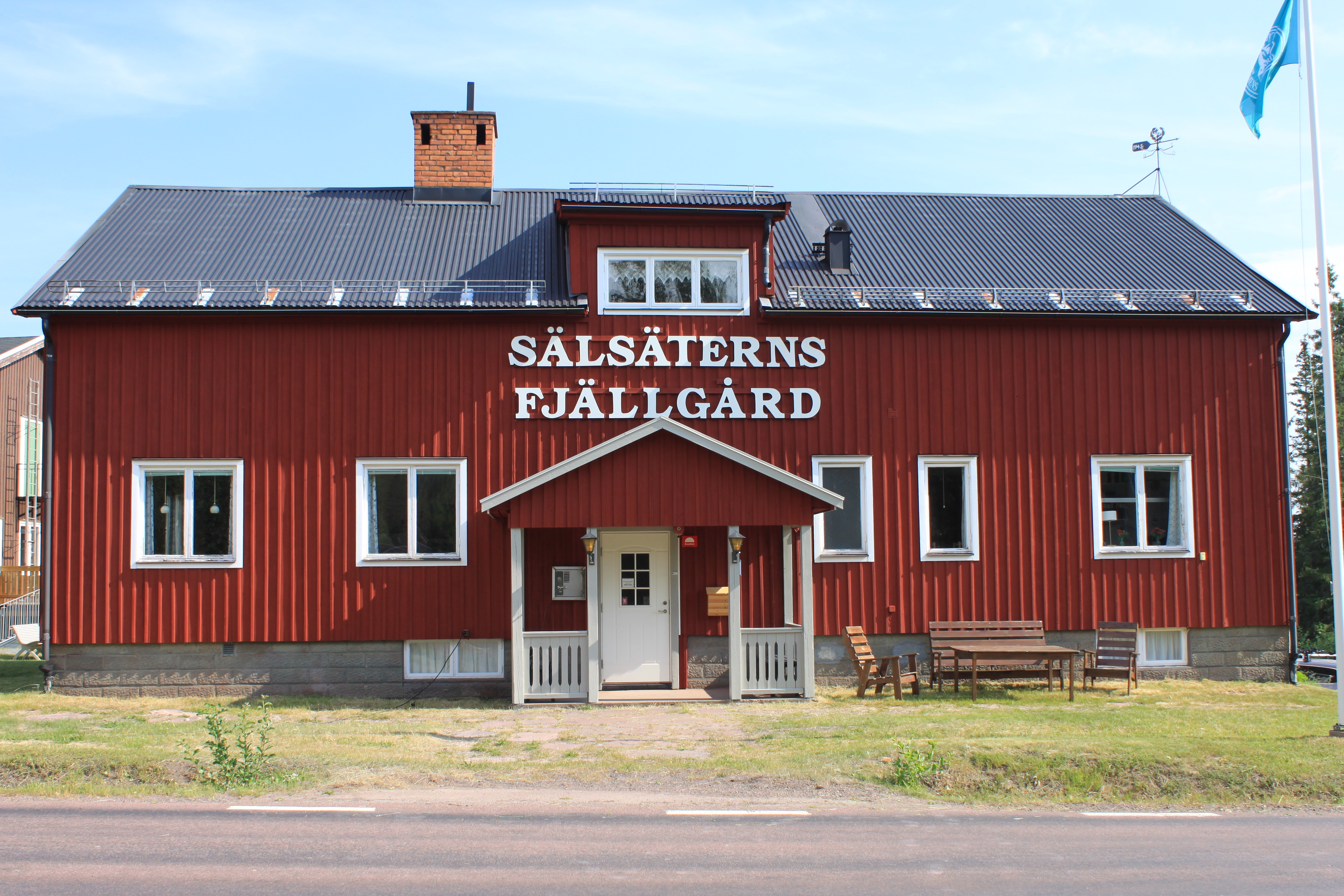
A Swedish "fell hostel" (Fjällgård) in Sälsätern, Dalarna

In Sweden, fjäll generally refers to any mountain or upland high enough that forest will not naturally survive at the top, in effect a mountain tundra. Fjäll is primarily used to describe mountains in the Nordic countries, but also more generally to describe mountains shaped by massive ice sheets, primarily in Arctic and subarctic regions. There are however dialectal differences in usage, with comparatively low mountains or plateaus, sometimes tree-covered, in Bohuslän and Västergötland (e.g. Safjällets naturreservat and Kynnefjäll) being referred to as "fjäll", similar to how the word is used in Norwegian

The Swedish Academy gave the following definition in 1924:

"Fell – mountain (or mountain range) of such height that it exceeds the tree line; sometimes especially of a mountain that reaches above the snow line (high fell) as opposed to those that do not reach there (low fell); compare alp, highland; in some areas (especially in Bohuslän and Dalsland) also of lower mountains (of a comparatively bare or wild and desolate nature); in the definite plural especially of the North Scandinavian mountains, formerly sometimes approaching the sense of a proper name, synonymous with the Scandinavian Mountains

Despite the 1924 source's claim that the definite plural form, fjällen, "formerly" approached being a proper name for the North Scandinavian mountains, the term has lived on as an informal proper name for the Scandinavian Mountains, now also being used in a singular collective sense: de svenska fjällen: "the Swedish fells", vs den svenska fjällen, "the Swedish fell collectively". The term is often used in conjunction with going on holiday to ski resorts in Fennoscandia, as is given by the Swedish 1998 music hit Vi drar till fjällen ("We're headin' to fjällen).

A related term is vål, which roughly mean "highland", found in placenames such as Fjätervålen, Vålådalen, etc.

== See also ==
- Fellfield
- Fell farming
- Fell Terrier
- List of fells in the Lake District
- List of Wainwrights (the 214 fells described in A. Wainwright's Pictorial Guide to the Lakeland Fells)
- The Outlying Fells of Lakeland
- List of Birketts (the 541 fells in Bill Birketts Complete Lakeland Fells)
- Middlesex Fells, a rocky highland just north of Boston, Massachusetts
- Snaefell, Isle of Man
- Nunatak
