= Vaara-Suomi =

Landscape region of Finland

Coordinates: 61.833°N 29.650°E

Vaara-Suomi (Finnish vaara: forested, gentle sloped sizeable mountain or hill, Suomi: Finland) is one of the landscape regions of Finland. It stretches from North Karelia ("Hills of Karelia") to Kainuu and Koillismaa ("Hill Country of Kainuu and Kuusamo"), north of the Finnish Lakeland.

Through North Karelia runs a range of quartzite ridged hills that reach above 200 m (660 ft) high, which are the remnants of a mountain chain, the Karelides, worn down over multiple glaciations. This belt of hills continues across Kainuu, the easternmost parts of North Ostrobothnia, and the southeastern tip of Lapland. The area is largely heavily forested taiga. Between the hills lie peatlands, lakes and rapids. The climate is continental. The peaks of the hills have unleached and thus fertile moraine soil.

The Hossa and Koli National Parks are in Vaara-Suomi. The highest peak is Valtavaara in Kuusamo (492 m).
