= Finnish Lakeland =

Landscape region of Finland

Coordinates: 61.341°N 28.011°E

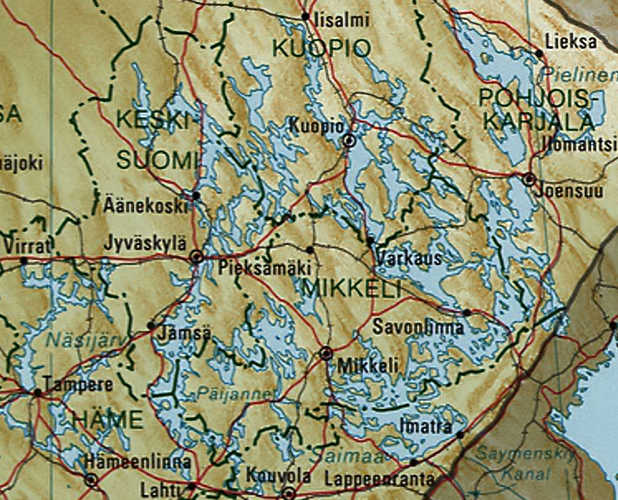
Finnish Lakeland.

Finnish Lakeland or the Finnish lake district (Finnish: Järvi-Suomi [ˈjærʋiˌsuo̯mi], "Lake Finland", Swedish: Insjöfinland) is a large landscape region in central eastern Finland.

The hilly, forest-covered landscape of Lakeland Finland's lake plateau is dominated by drumlins and by long sinuous eskers. Both are glacial remnants deposited after the continental glaciers that scoured and gouged the country's surface receded about 10,000 years ago.

The lake basins of the lakeland originate from the joint work of weathering and erosion of fractures in the bedrock. The erosion that made the depressions occurred before and during the Quaternary ice ages. Erosion along fractures has produced linear inlets among the lakes.

== Demarcation ==
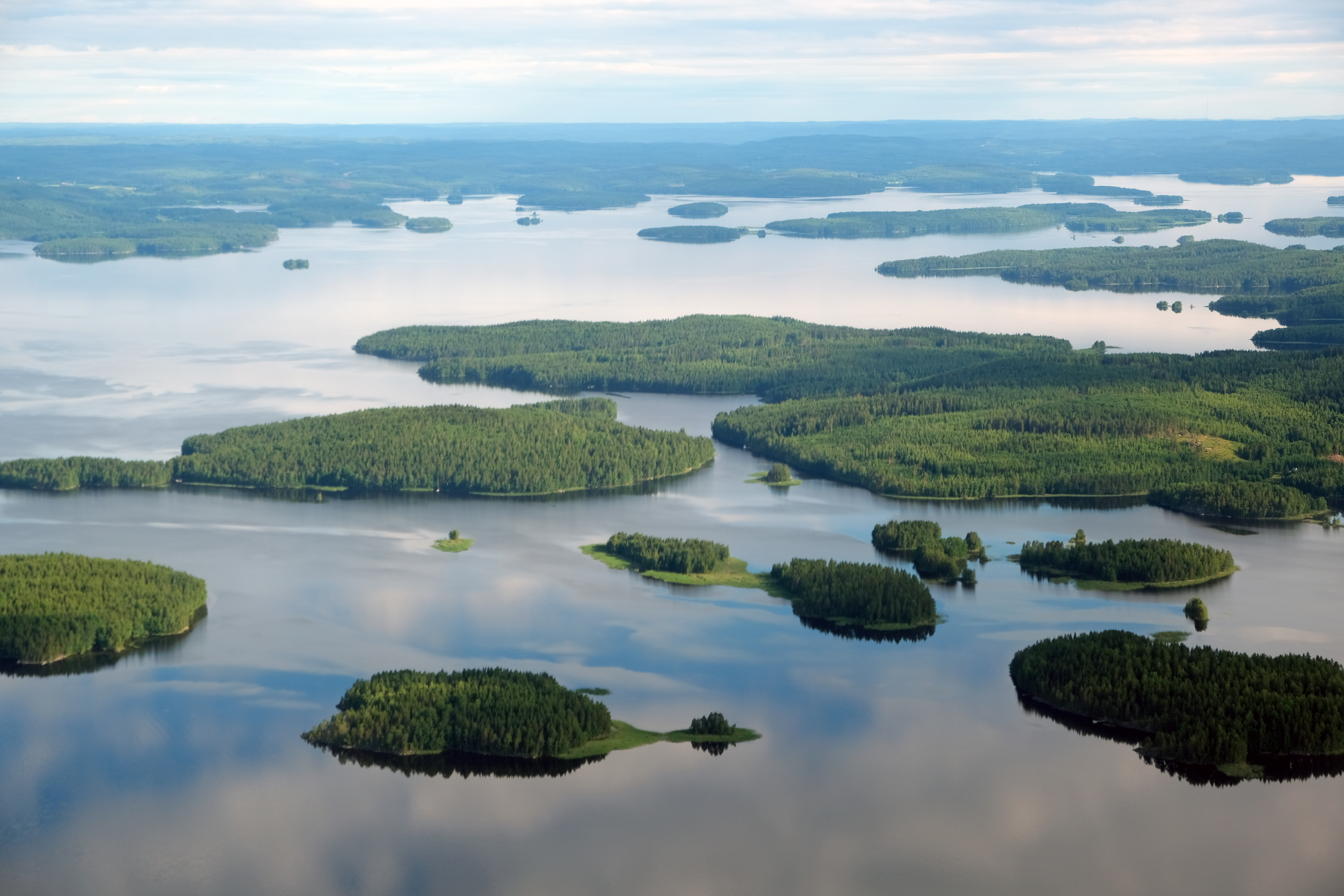
Aerial view of Lake Päijänne

The district occupies most of central and East Finland and is bounded to the south by the Salpausselkä Ridges. These ridges are terminal moraines, which trap networks of thousands of lakes separated by hilly forested countryside.

The lake district turns into the Coastal Finland district to the West and Northwest, and is bounded by the Upland Finland to the North.

The lake landscape continues to the East and extends into Russia (Karelian Isthmus and Republic of Karelia).

Finnish Lakeland stretches approximately 370 kilometers from south to north and about 350 kilometers from east to west.

== Lakes ==
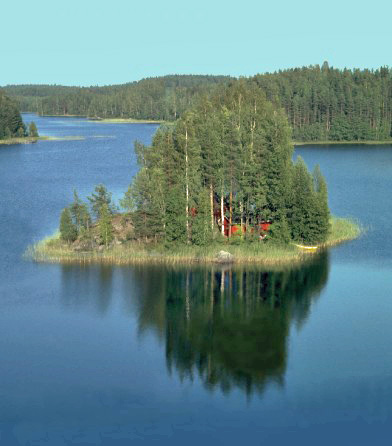
A summer cottage ("mökki") on a lake island.

Lakes occupy about 25% of the Lakeland. Much of the territory is forested and has a low population density. The main cities in the region are Imatra, Joensuu, Jyväskylä, Kuopio, Lappeenranta, Mikkeli, Pieksämäki, Savonlinna and Varkaus. Since lakes formed the main transport route in earlier times, urban areas are often located on lakeshore, occasionally even on isthmuses or peninsulas, e.g. Varkaus, Savonlinna and Kuopio. The lakes often have extremely convoluted coastlines and consist of several nearly separate stretches of open water (selkä) connected by narrow sounds. Thus, they can connect large areas along shores and their hinterlands.

Because no set definition of what constitutes a lake and no procedures for counting the number of lakes exist, it has been impossible to ascertain exactly how many lakes the region has. There are, however, at least 55,000 lakes that are at least 200 metres wide.

If lake is defined to be a body of standing water larger than 500 square metres, then there are 187,888 lakes in Finland. On average, there are 40 lakes per 100 square kilometres in the district. The lake number density is largest north of the Lake Inari, up to 1,000 per 100 square kilometres, so that the area is sometimes called Lampi-Suomi (Pond Finland, Finnish pond district).

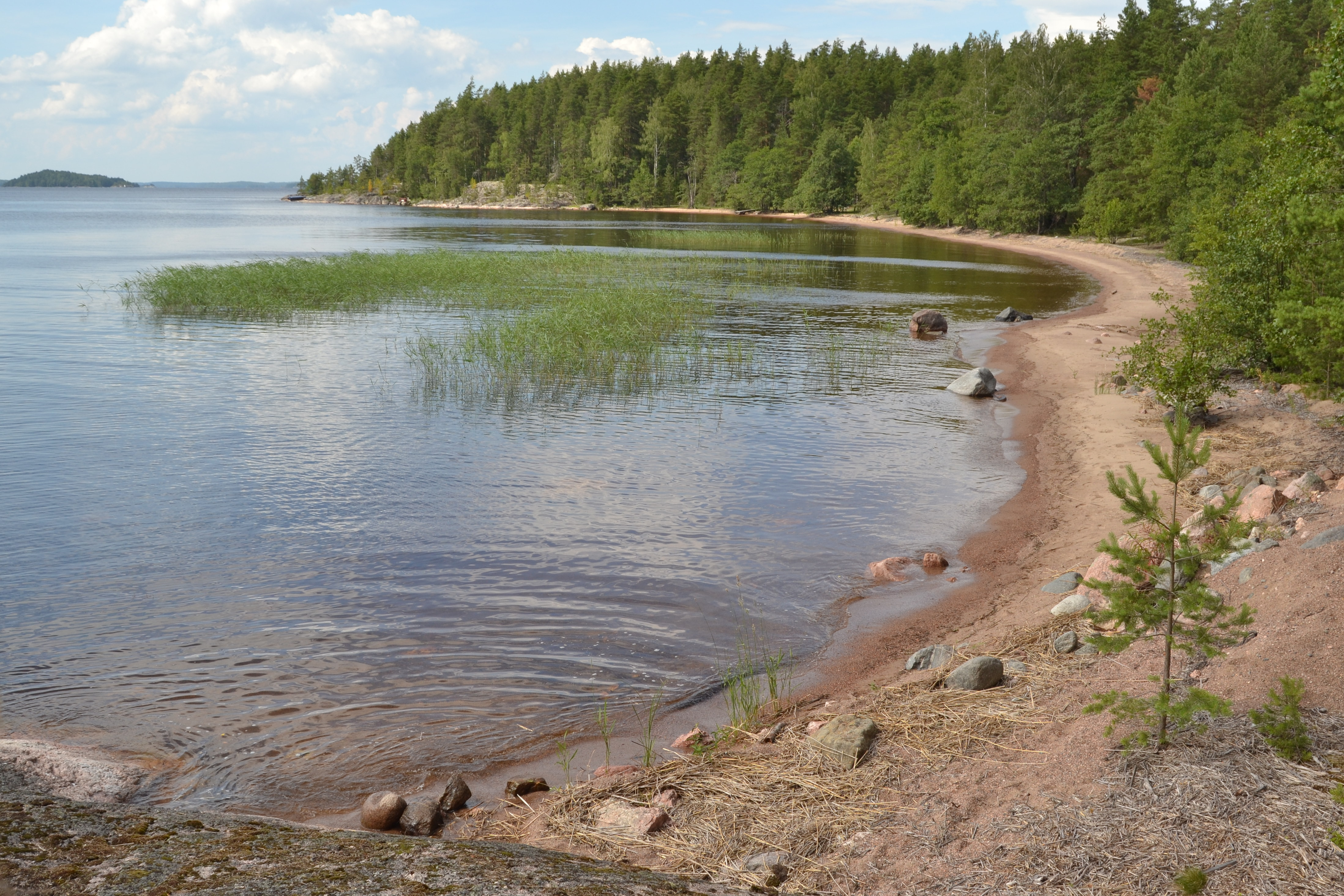
Hietasaari, Lake Saimaa

The largest is Lake Saimaa, which, with a surface area of more than 4,400 square kilometres, is the fourth largest natural freshwater lake in Europe. Lake Saimaa itself contains 5,484 islands, and islands in the greater Saimaa region (Finnish: Suur-Saimaa) number up to 13,710. The deepest lake, Päijänne, has a maximum depth of only 95.3 metres; the depth of the average lake is 7 metres.

The Saimaa Canal connects the Lake Saimaa to the Vyborg Bay of the Gulf of Finland, Baltic Sea. Another connection to the Baltic Sea is the Vuoksi River, which flows from Saimaa to Lake Ladoga, from where the water subsequently flows through Neva River into the Gulf of Finland, bypassing the Salpausselkä.

Lake Päijänne is the second-largest lake in Finland, which drains into the Gulf of Finland via the Kymi River and which is used as a drinking water supply for Helsinki.

== See also ==
- List of lakes of Finland
- Archipelago Sea
- Finnish Lakeland travel guide from Wikivoyage
