= Karelides =

The Karelides are an ancient mountain chain located between Eastern Finland and Lapland. It forms the current hill zone of Eastern Finland and Lapland's arctic hills, splitting central Finland. The Karelides formed about two billion years ago, when thick sandstone formations were tilted and folded during an orogeny involving a collision of continental plates. Subsequent erosion has left a ridge of resistant quartzite, which has stood there for millions of years. The Karelides were once around 4km high but have been all but eroded to the point where only a peneplain remains.

The mountains in the north-west corner of Finnish Lapland belong to the more recent Scandinavian Mountains and are higher than other Finnish mountains. The third mountain group is the Svecofennides, which run from Southern Finland to Sweden.
