= Hindscarth =

Mountain in Cumbria, England

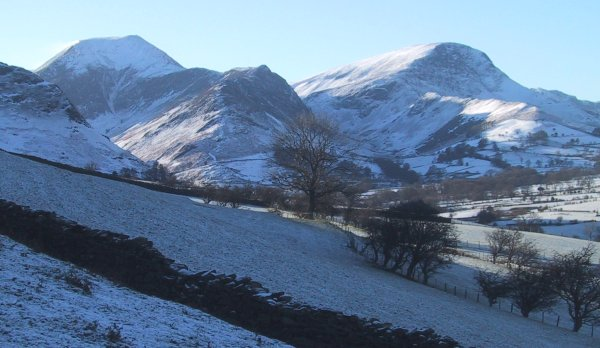
- Hindscarth and Robinson from Catbells

Highest point
- Elevation: 727 m (2,385 ft)
- Prominence: 71 m (233 ft)
- Parent peak: Dale Head
- Listing: Hewitt, Wainwright, Nuttall
- Coordinates: 54°32′16″N 3°12′53″W

Naming
- English translation: pass used by the red deer
- Language of name: Norse

Geography
- Location within the Lake District Location within the former Allerdale Borough
- Location: Cumbria, England
- Parent range: Lake District, North Western Fells
- OS grid: NY215165
- Topo map: OS Landrangers 89, 90, Explorer OL4

Hindscarth is a mountain between the valleys of Buttermere and Newlands, in the north-western part of the English Lake District. The fell's name is derived from two words from the Old Norse language, Hind and Skarth, and means the pass used by the red deer.

== Topography ==
The North Western Fells occupy the area between the rivers Derwent and Cocker, a broadly oval swathe of hilly country, elongated on a north-south axis. Two roads cross from east to west, dividing the fells into three convenient groups. Hindscarth stands in the southern sector. The principal ridge in this group of fells runs east from Buttermere, climbing over Robinson, Hindscarth and Dale Head. It then turns north, descending gradually toward Derwentwater, the main tops being High Spy, Maiden Moor and Catbells.

The ridge from Robinson to Dale Head forms the heads of Little Dale and Newlands, bypassing the intervening summit of Hindscarth. This stands off to the north, forming the dividing wall between the two valleys. The long north-west ridge steps down over several tiers of crag to the confluence of its bordering streams. The southern face of Hindscarth looks down over Honister Pass.

== Ascents ==
A popular ascent starts from a parking area nearby Newlands Church and passes over the Scope End ridge before continuing up crags to the summit. Due to their proximity, Hindscarth and Robinson are often combined into a single walk starting from Newlands. The fell is also part of a longer walk including Catbells, High Spy, Dale Head and along the Littledale Edge ridge to Robinson — the Newlands horseshoe.

== Geology ==
Hindscarth is an example of the Buttermere Formation, an olistostrome of disrupted, sheared and folded mudstone, siltstone and sandstone.

== Mining ==
The northern ridge of Hindscarth which falls away to the Newlands valley has at its foot (at Scope End) one of the most famous former mines in the Lake District. The Goldscope mine has been designated as a major national important site by English Heritage who have stated that it should receive priority treatment for its protection and preservation. The mine was opened in 1564 and developed in its early days by German miners, who worked its rich veins of lead and copper. The mine was considered so important in its early days that it was requisitioned for the Crown by Elizabeth I from its then-owner, the Earl of Northumberland. There are considerable spoil heaps on the Newlands Beck side of Scope End and the shaft inside the hillside was sunk to such a considerable depth that it became uneconomical to pump out the water, leading to the closure of the mine at the end of the 19th century.

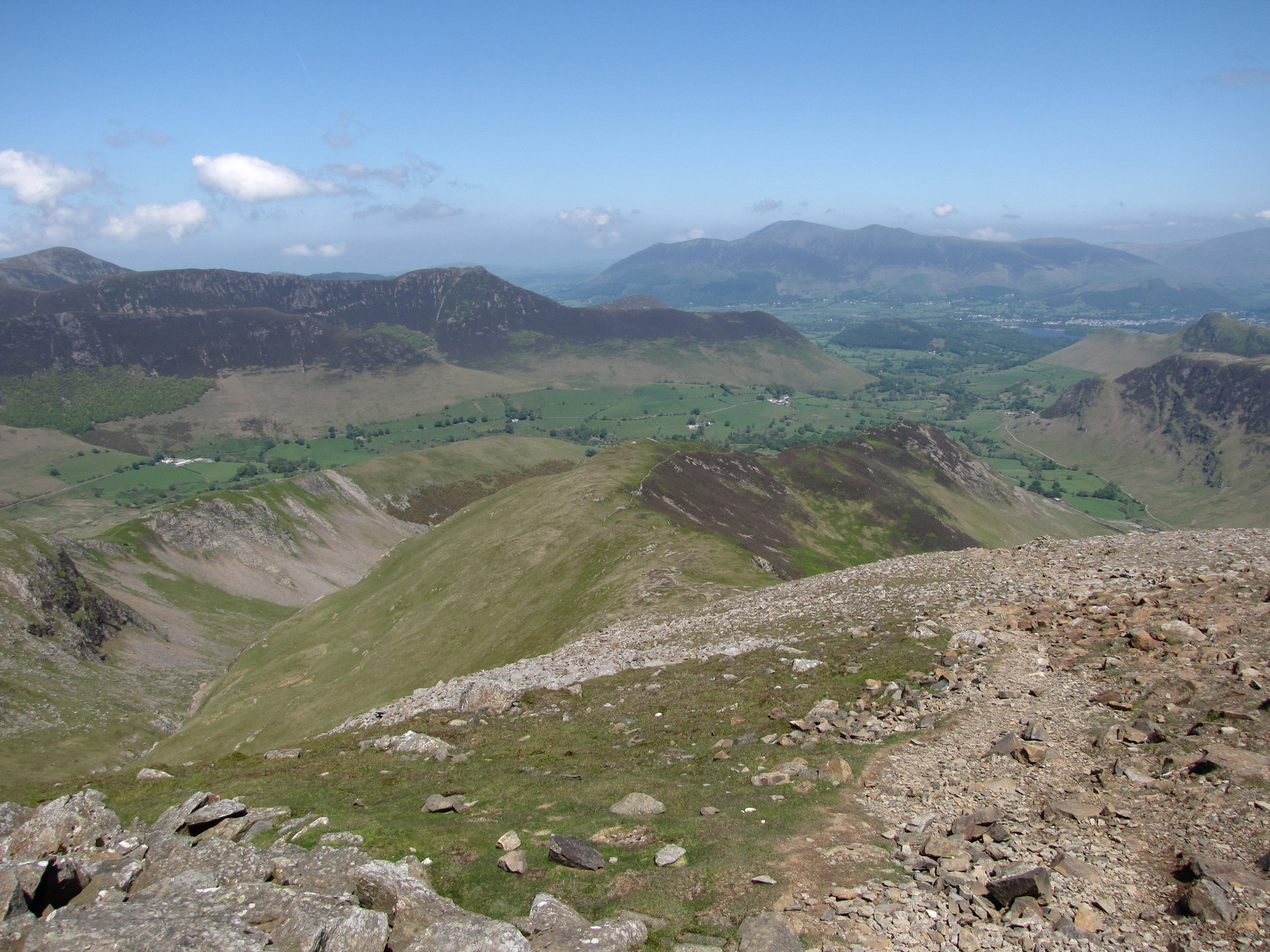
Looking down the north ridge from the summit shelter to the Newlands Valley

== Summit ==
The summit carries an untidy cairn amid some embedded rocks. Elsewhere there are patches of grass and gravel. A hundred yards south is a larger cairn, marked as a Shelter on Ordnance Survey maps. The view north into the Newlands Valley is excellent, backed by Skiddaw. All of the major fell groups with the exception of High Street can be seen.
