= Robinson (Lake District) =

Mountain in United Kingdom

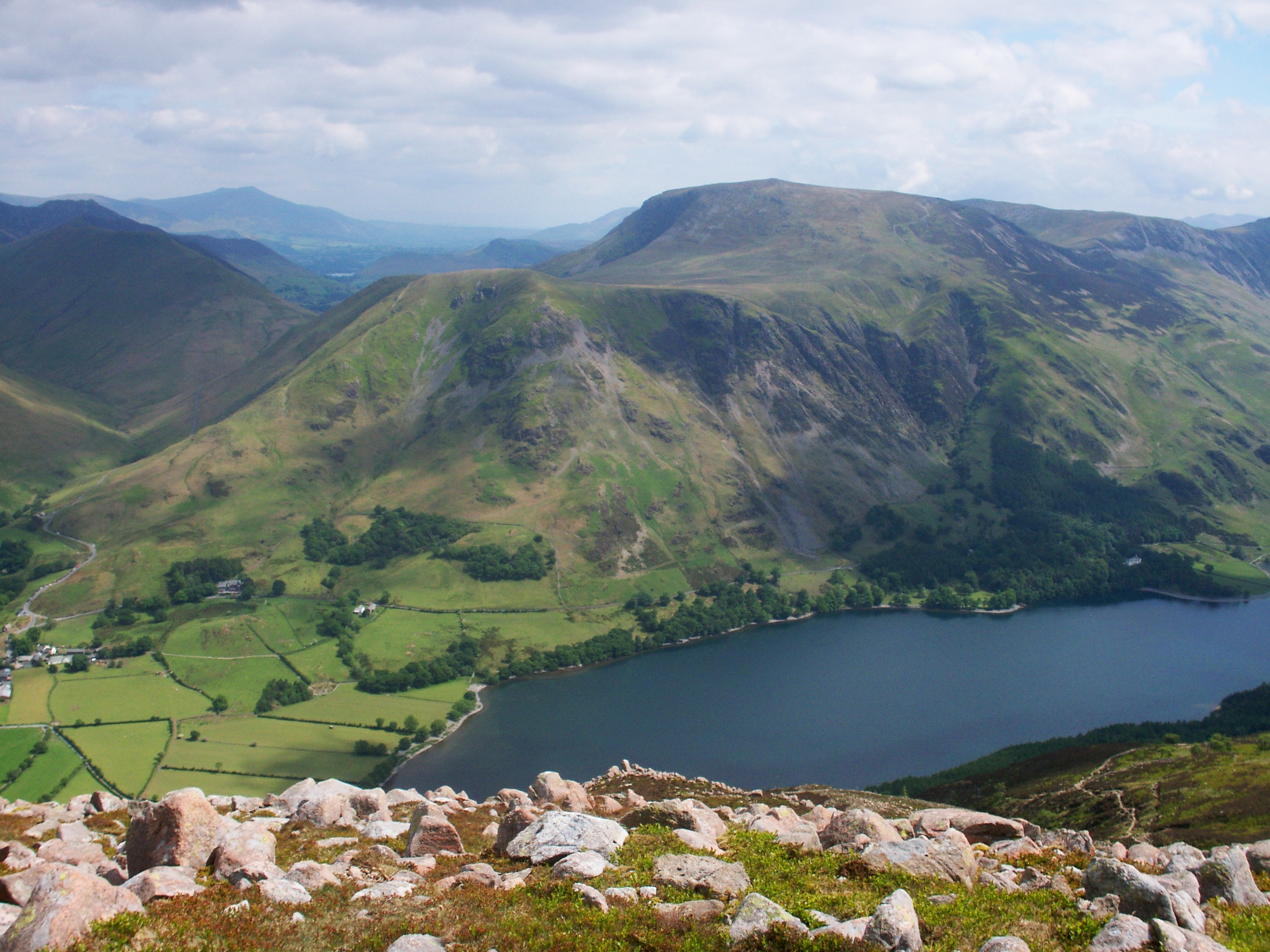
- Robinson seen across Buttermere with High Snockrigg in front to the left

Highest point
- Elevation: 737 m (2,418 ft)
- Prominence: 161 m (528 ft)
- Parent peak: Dale Head
- Listing: Marilyn, Hewitt, Wainwright, Nuttall
- Coordinates: 54°32′24″N 3°14′10″W

Geography
- Location within the Lake District Location within the former Allerdale Borough
- Location: Cumbria, England
- Parent range: Lake District, North Western Fells
- OS grid: NY201168
- Topo map(s): OS Landrangers 89, 90, Explorer, OL4

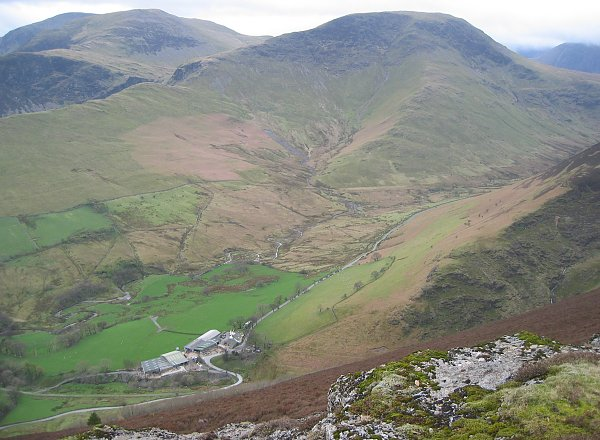
Robinson seen from the Ard Crags ridge, with Hindscarth to the left

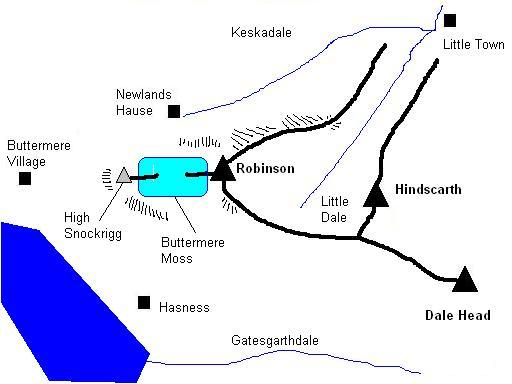
sketch map of Robinson

Robinson is a fell in the English Lake District, its southern slopes descending to Buttermere, while its northern side is set in the Newlands Valley. Paths lead to the summit from the village of Buttermere, from the nearby summit Dale Head and from various locations in the valleys to the north.

== Name ==
According to influential guidebook author Alfred Wainwright, the name Robinson comes from a Richard Robinson who purchased estates in the Buttermere area many centuries ago. These included this unnamed hill which was then called "Robinson's Fell", later shortened to Robinson.

== Topography ==
The North Western Fells occupy the area between the rivers Derwent and Cocker, a broadly oval swathe of hilly country, elongated on a north–south axis. Two roads cross from east to west, dividing the fells into three convenient groups. Robinson stands in the southern sector. The principal ridge in this group of fells runs east from Buttermere, climbing over Robinson, Hindscarth and Dale Head. It then turns north, descending gradually toward Derwentwater, the main tops being High Spy, Maiden Moor and Catbells.

Robinson appears bland from Buttermere, smooth rounded slopes curving up from the valley floor. Viewed from Keswick or Newlands to the north, its character is altogether different. From here the wall of Robinson Crags drops from the summit of the fell, a great chunk of the hillside seemingly missing.

The western flanks of the fell fall to Buttermere, the village itself standing on Robinson's territory. The top and bottom sections are quite steep but the slope levels out at 1,500 feet (460 m) to accommodate Buttermere Moss, in Wainwright's words “ a wide marshy depression from which water cannot escape except by being carried away in the boots of pedestrians.” At the head of the lower slope is the subsidiary top of High Snockrigg (1,725 feet; 526 m), a fine viewpoint for the Buttermere valley. On the south western rim of the Moss is Goat Crag, overlooking Buttermere lake.

To the south of Robinson are Gatesgarthdale Beck and the road up Honister Pass. This side of the fell presents a long and mainly featureless slope, although near the summit are the Hackney Holes, curious rocky depressions of uncertain origin (but see Geology section).

Running south east from the summit is Littledale Edge, an airy escarpment which connects to the neighbouring fell of Hindscarth. To the north of the Edge is a steady descent into the head of Little Dale, part of the Newlands catchment. This valley runs north east, flanked by parallel ridges descending from Robinson and Hindscarth, its stream being named Scope Beck. Robinson's north east ridge is rough and craggy towards the top before levelling out onto the grassy spur of High Snab Bank. This finally runs down to Newlands Church and the hamlet of Little Town. Beneath the nose of the ridge is the confluence of Scope Beck and Keskadale Beck.

Keskadale forms the north western boundary of Robinson and is also the route of Newlands Pass, crossing the North Western Fells from Braithwaite to Buttermere. Its summit at Newlands Hause (1,092 feet; 333 m) lies beneath the northern edge of Buttermere Moss, from which the waterfall of Moss Force drops within easy reach of the road.

== Geology ==
Robinson's summit area is composed of rocks of the Buttermere Formation. This is an olistostrome of disrupted, sheared and folded mudstone, siltstone and sandstone. West and north east of the summit are outcroppings of the Robinson Member. This comprises large olistoliths of greywacke sandstone, with interbedded mudstone and siltstone. The southern flanks are a large area of landslip.

There has been considerable mining activity in the vicinity, particularly at the Goldscope Mine, but this has all taken place beneath the slopes of neighbouring Hindscarth. The remains of a small reservoir can still be seen in Little Dale. Robinson itself has a pair of short levels driven for lead, near to the south east corner of Buttermere lake. They appear not to have progressed beyond trials.

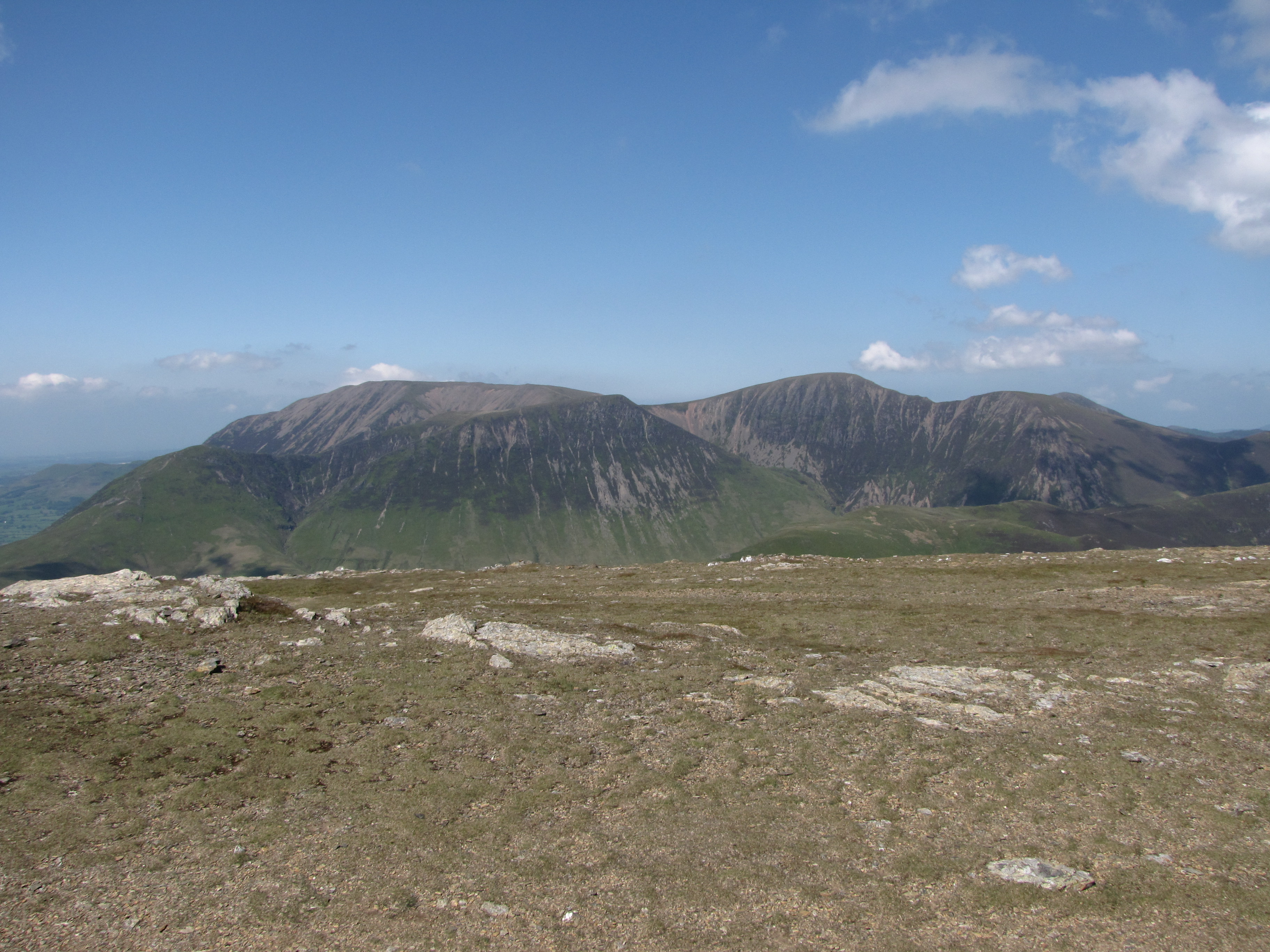
Looking north-west from the summit to the Coledale Fells.

The mysterious Hackney Holes are now interpreted as the source of the largest 'rock slope failure' in the Lake District (1.3 km^{2}), where most of the Buttermere-Gatesgarthdale trough wall has deformed and bulged downslope, leaving open trenches (the Holes) or, across the Little Dale col, a chevron pattern of short steep scarps; midslope, there are bold antiscarps (uphill-facing scarplets), a classic indicator. Littledale Edge marks the beheading of the original dale by the more vigorous Buttermere valley, fed by ice escaping through Honister Pass from Borrowdale. This geologically recent deep incision has destabilised the slope.

== Summit ==
The top is rounded and mainly of grass, but there are two low outcrops of rock with loose stones between. The more westerly of these is the summit and bears a cairn. There is another prominent cairn at the top of the north east ridge. From below this appears to be the summit, but disappointment awaits anyone so deceived by the convex slope. Fair paths run to Buttermere, Littledale Edge and the north east ridge, once the grass is reached.

The view is robbed of foreground by the broad plateau of the summit, but serried ranks of fells appear in all directions. All of the principal groups with the exception of the Far Eastern Fells are in sight.

== Ascents ==
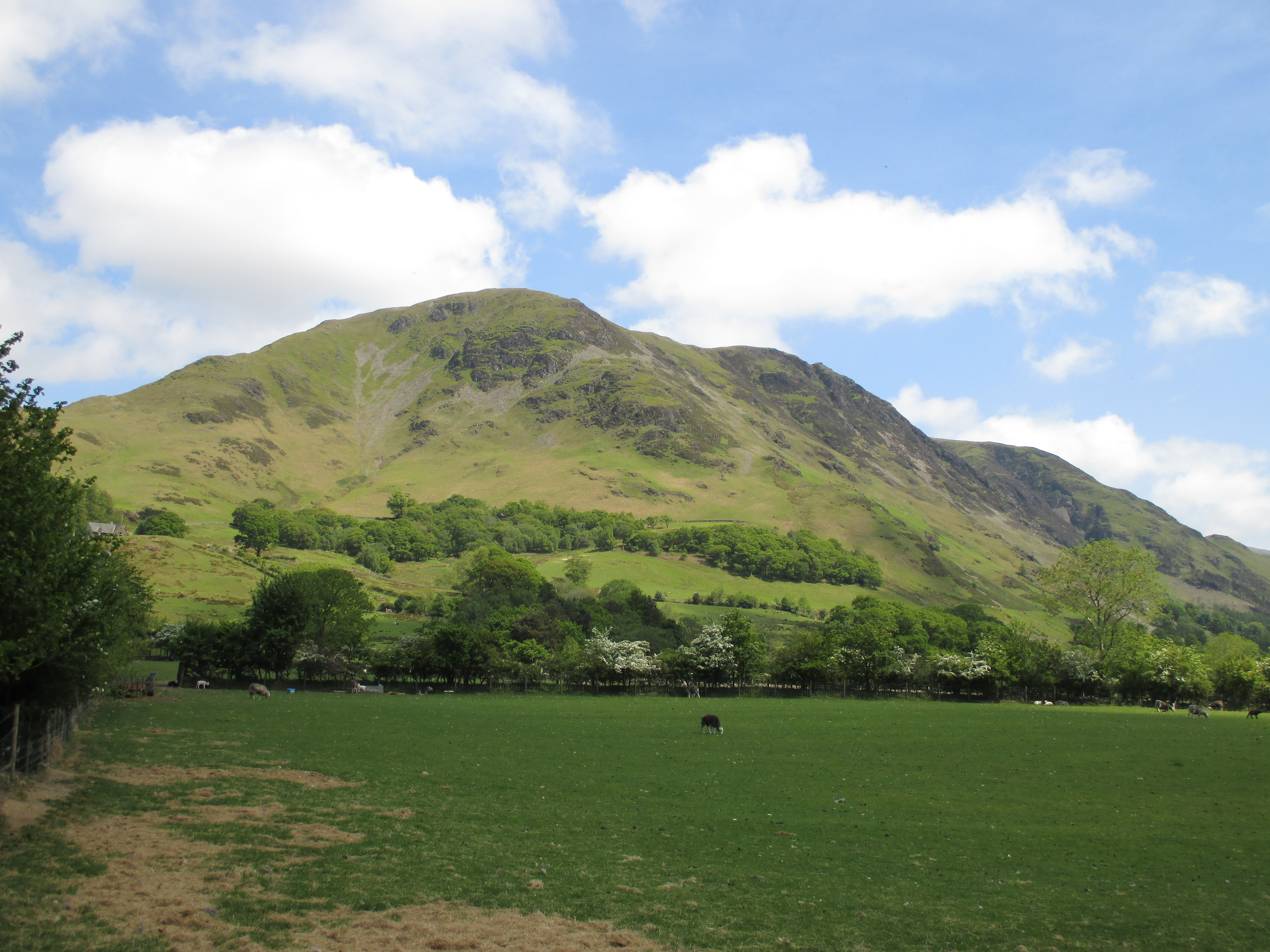
High Snockrigg seen from near the foot of Buttermere

Buttermere Village provides a popular starting point, a good path leading up via High Snockrigg. Conditions deteriorate at the crossing of Buttermere Moss, followed by a stiff climb to the summit. Another route from Buttermere begins further south at Hassness, working around Goat Crag to join the main path above the moss. Access can also be gained from the Honister Pass road, from a point near the first bridge over the beck at about 500 feet (150 metres). From here a direct line northward will bring the walker to Littledale Edge.

The north east ridge provides an walk from the Newlands valley, rising up successive steps. Finally, a great deal of height can be gained by car, if the fell is climbed from Newlands Hause. The route ascends to the right of Moss Force, before the path is lost for a while in the Moss itself. A rough climb to the summit then follows. By passing the Moss to the west, Newlands Hause provides speedy access to High Snockrigg for what Wainwright and Birkett describe as fine views and a place for a picnic.
