= Cat Bells =

Mountain in Cumbria, England

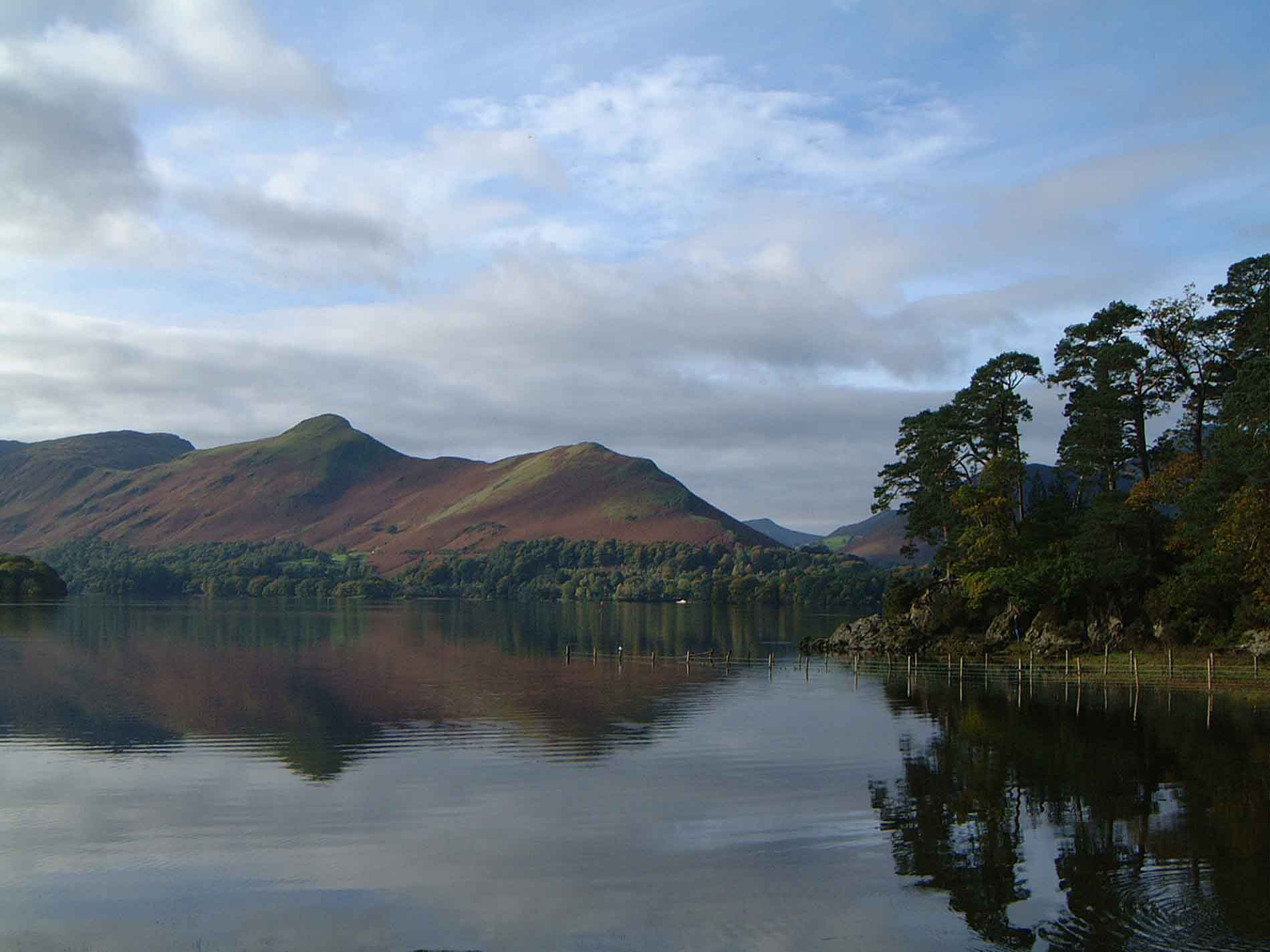
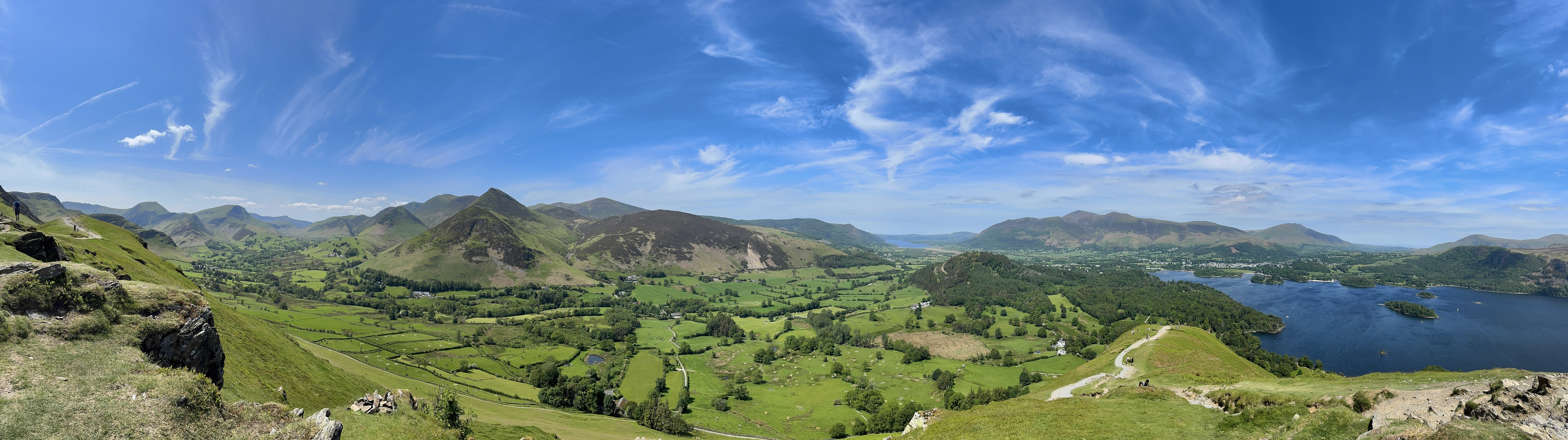
- The classic view of Cat Bells from near Friars' Crag on the opposite side of Derwentwater The panorama view from the Cat Bells Hike overlooking Derwentwater Lake.

Highest point
- Elevation: 451 m (1,480 ft)
- Prominence: 86 m (282 ft)
- Parent peak: Dale Head
- Listing: Wainwright
- Coordinates: 54°34′07″N 3°10′15″W

Geography
- Location within the Lake District
- Location: Cumbria, England
- Parent range: Lake District, North Western Fells
- OS grid: NY244199
- Topo map: OS Landrangers 89, 90, Explorer OL4

Cat Bells is a fell in the English Lake District in the county of Cumbria. It has a height of 451 metres (1,480 ft) and is one of the most popular fells in the area. It is situated on the western shore of Derwentwater within three miles (five kilometres) of the busy tourist town of Keswick. Its distinctive shape catches the attention of many visitors to the Lakes who feel compelled to climb to the summit after seeing it from the viewpoint of Friars' Crag on the opposite side of Derwentwater. The Lake District writer and walker Alfred Wainwright acknowledges the popularity of Cat Bells among fellwalkers of all abilities by saying:

"It is one of the great favourites, a family fell where grandmothers and infants can climb the heights together, a place beloved. Its popularity is well deserved: its shapely topknott attracts the eye offering a steep but obviously simple scramble."

== Name ==
The fell's unusual name may well have come from a distortion of "Cat Bields" meaning shelter of the wild cat, although this is not certain. The fell's name is sometimes written as Catbells.

== Topography ==
Cat Bells is the last fell on the ridge separating Derwentwater from the Newlands Valley. It rises due south from Hawse End, reaching the summit in two distinct steps. The lower top is named Skelgill Bank. Beyond the summit of Cat Bells is the steep-sided depression of Hause Gate, before the ridge broadens and twists south westward to Maiden Moor.

== Geology ==
The Cat Bells ridge is an example of the Buttermere Formation, an olistostrome of disrupted, sheared and folded mudstone, siltstone and sandstone.

== Ascents ==
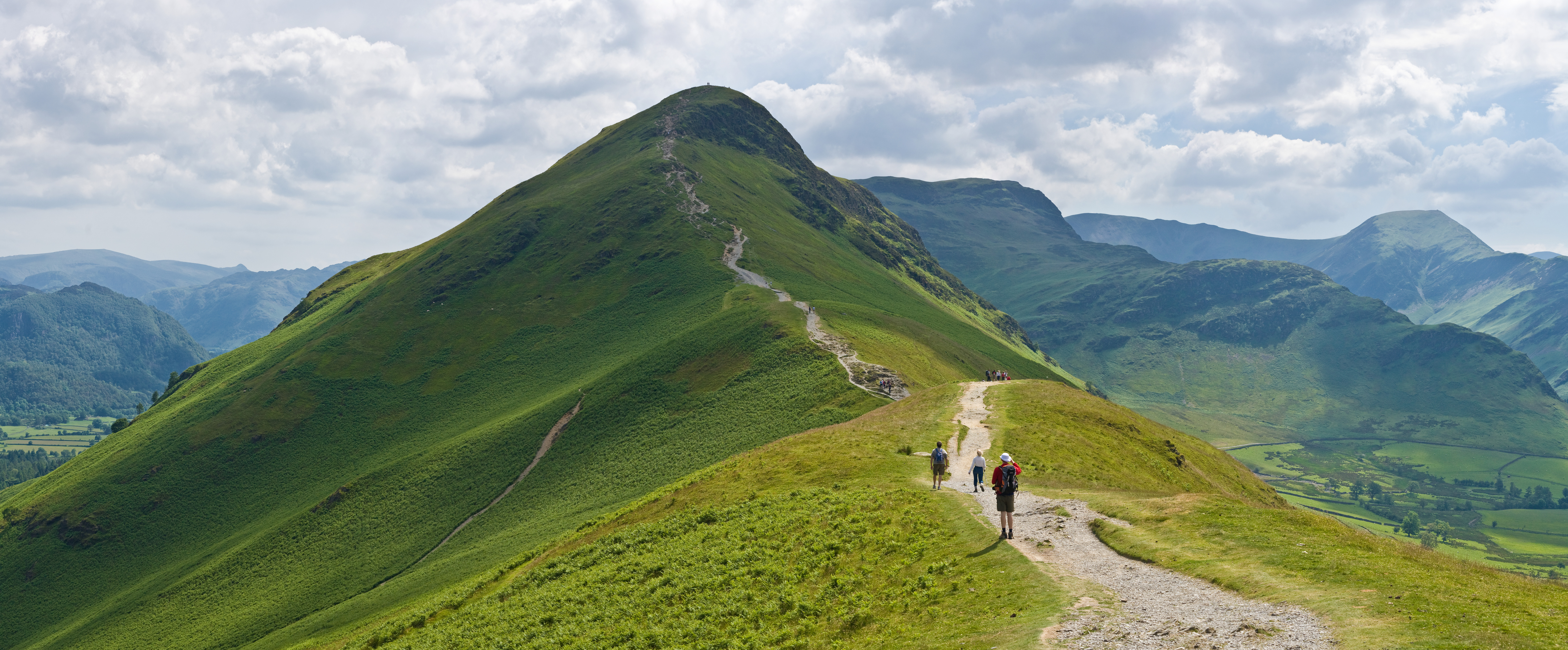
The ascent along the northern ridge facing the summit to the south

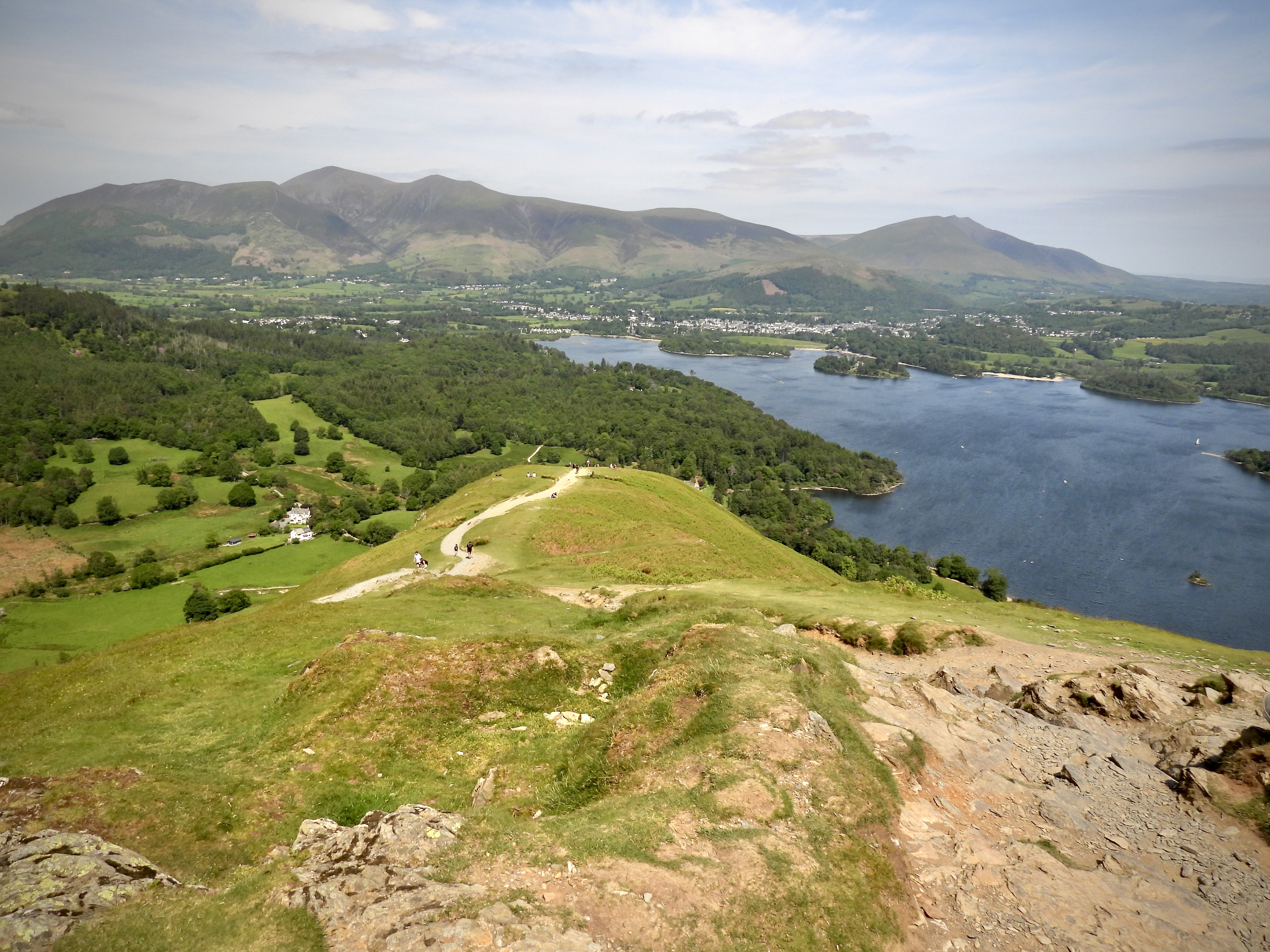
The view of Derwentwater Lake from the Cat Bells Hike near Keswick.

Nearly all ascents of Cat Bells start from Hawse End at the foot of the northern ridge; there is car parking here but the spaces soon get taken on busy summer days. Ascents can also be made from Grange and from Newlands. Hawse End is also served by the Derwentwater Motor Launch and this enables visitors to Keswick to combine a sail on the lake with an ascent of the fell. Many walkers who reach the top of Cat Bells return to their starting point after admiring the view: however, strong walkers can continue along the ridge to take in the fells of Maiden Moor, High Spy, Dale Head, Hindscarth and Robinson to give a horseshoe walk which ends in the Newlands valley close to Hawse End.

== Summit ==
The summit is all rock with many loose stones lying amid the small outcrops. The view from the top of Cat Bells gives a fine panorama which is dominated by the aerial view of Derwentwater. Bassenthwaite Lake, the Newlands Valley, Skiddaw and Keswick all show well to the north, while the view south has a fine vista of Borrowdale.

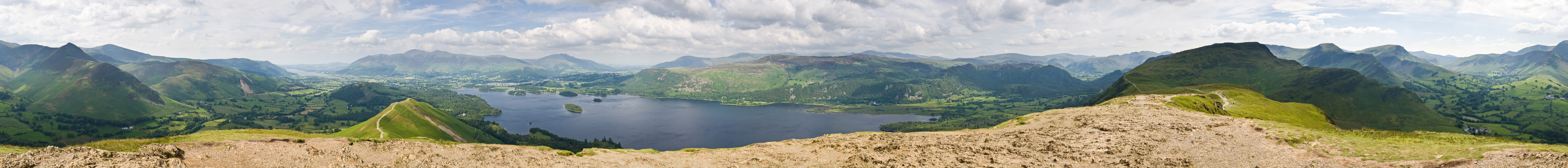
A 360 degree view from the summit of Cat Bells. The view North of the summit (middle of the image) takes in Skiddaw, Blencathra and Keswick on the edge of Derwentwater.

== Mining ==
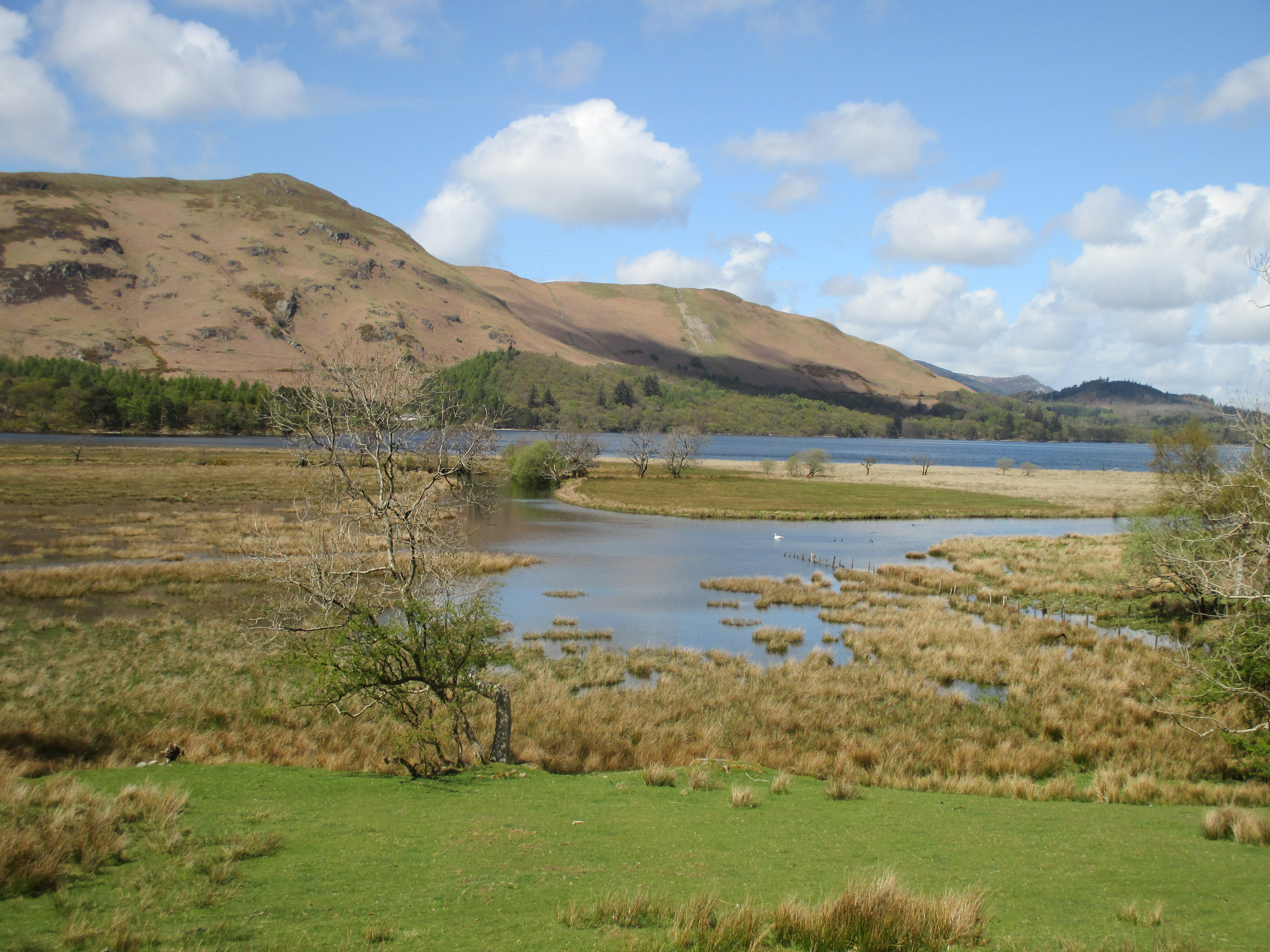
Cat Bells and Skelgill Bank

Although Cat Bells is renowned as a "family fell" it does have some dangers especially from the disused lead mines on its slopes. The Yewthwaite mine, which is on the western side of the fell has extensive spoil heaps and shafts. Many of the shafts were previously open and dangerous but most have now been blocked off. The Brandlehow and Old Brandley Mine worked a lode for lead ore on the Derwentwater (eastern) side of the fell. All three mines ceased production in the 1890s.

== Literary associations ==
- On the lower slopes of the fell above Derwentwater stands Brackenburn Lodge, now holiday accommodation but formerly the home of Hugh Walpole who wrote the Herries series of books when he lived here from 1924 to his death in 1941, in what he called "a little paradise on Cat Bells".
- Beatrix Potter placed the home of Mrs Tiggy-Winkle on the east slopes of Cat Bells.
- A poem celebrating this wonderful fell Cat Bells - A Villanelle

== Memorials ==
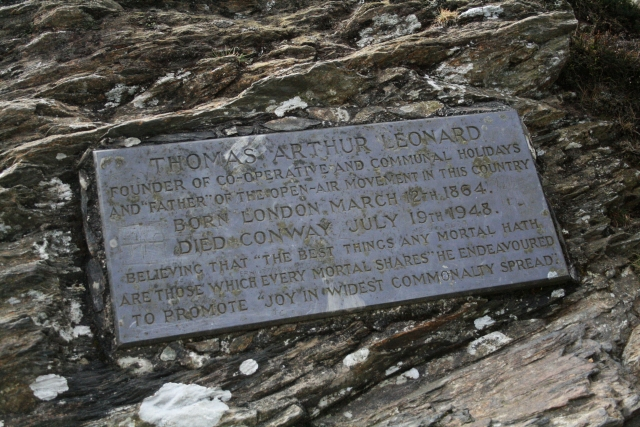
Memorial plaque to T. A. Leonard at Cat Bells

On the lower slopes of the fell is a memorial stone to Thomas Arthur Leonard (1864-1948), a pioneer of outdoor holidays for working people who founded the Co-operative Holidays Association and the Holiday Fellowship.
