= Newlands horseshoe =

The Newlands horseshoe is a circular walk in the Lake District, incorporating the main peaks surrounding the Newlands Valley.

== Standard round ==
The regular horseshoe covers six peaks, and approximately 15 kilometres (9 1/2 miles) of walking. It includes the fells Catbells (451 m), Maiden Moor (576 m), High Spy (653 m), Dale Head (753 m), Hindscarth (727 m) and Robinson (737 m). The walk may be extended by another five miles (eight kilometres) or so, and by four more peaks, by including an extra traverse from Knott Rigg (556 m) to Causey Pike (637 m), but the Horseshoe proper – culminating in what Wainwright called “the deep trench confined by Maiden Moor and Hindscarth” – surrounds and encloses Upper Newlands itself.

== Wainwright’s version ==
Wainwright himself favoured a slightly reduced round, beginning at Cat Bells but omitting Robinson in favour of a descent via Hindscarth (727 m) and Scope End (412 m). Apart from the beauty of the track itself, the latter descent (in his opinion) “earns full marks because of the lovely views of Newlands directly ahead”.

== See also ==
- Coledale horseshoe
- Fairfield horseshoe
