= Herbert of Derwentwater =

Anglo-Saxon hermit in Cumbria, England

Coordinates: 54.58128°N 3.14765°W

Saint Herbert of Derwentwater (died 20 March 687) was an Anglo-Saxon priest and hermit who lived on the small St Herbert's Island in Derwentwater, Cumbria, England. His friendship with St Cuthbert is explored in a poem by William Wordsworth.

== Biography ==
Information on Herbert's life comes from Book IV Chapter 29 of Bede's Ecclesiastical History of the English People (c. 731) and the Life of St. Cuthbert (c. 720s).

Herbert's date of birth is unknown. He was for long a close friend and disciple of Cuthbert of Lindisfarne, at whose request he became an anchorite, living for many years on the small Derwentwater island now named after him. He ate fish from the lake and grew vegetables round his cell.

Herbert visited Cuthbert in Lindisfarne every year to receive spiritual direction. In AD 686, hearing that his friend was visiting Carlisle to give the veil to Queen Eormenburg (widow of Ecgfrith of Northumbria), he went to see him there, instead of at Lindisfarne as was usual. After they had spoken together, St Cuthbert said, "Brother Herbert, tell to me now all that you have need to ask or speak, for never shall we see one another again in this world. For I know that the time of my decease is at hand." Then Herbert fell weeping at his feet and begged that St Cuthbert would obtain for him the grace that they might both be admitted to praise God in heaven at the same time. And St Cuthbert prayed and then made answer, "Rise, my brother, weep not, but rejoice that the mercy of God has granted our desire." Herbert, returning to his hermitage, fell to a long sickness, and purified of his imperfections, died on the same day, 20 March 687, on which St Cuthbert died on Holy Island.

== Veneration ==
Herbert's feast day is 20 March. Cuthbert's feast is more popular and Herbert's has been largely forgotten. The remains of his hermitage survive at the north end of St Herbert's Island. Each year the Catholic parish of Our Lady of the Lakes and St Charles arranges to celebrate Mass on St Herbert's Island in his memory. Since 1983 pilgrimages have been made from Chadderton to Cumbria, parishioners joining others from Lake District churches in crossing Derwentwater and celebrating Mass on the island.

There are churches dedicated to St Herbert at Braithwaite and Carlisle in Cumbria, Darlington in County Durham and Chadderton in Greater Manchester. Friars' Crag on Derwentwater is named after the monks who sailed to St Herbert's Island on pilgrimage to visit the saint.

The Dominican priest, philosopher and theologian Herbert McCabe's novice master, Columba Ryan, gave him the religious name Herbert, in an ironic reference to McCabe's tendency to shock.

== In literature ==
William Wordsworth's poem For The Spot Where The Hermitage Stood on St Herbert's Island, Derwentwater, marks the spiritual friendship between St Cuthbert and Herbert.

St Herbert appears under the name "Erebert" as a character in Melvyn Bragg's mostly fictional book Credo about the life of St Bega.

St Herbert's Island inspired "Owl Island" in Beatrix Potter's book The Tale of Squirrel Nutkin.
