= Friars' Crag =

Beauty spot in the English Lake District National Park

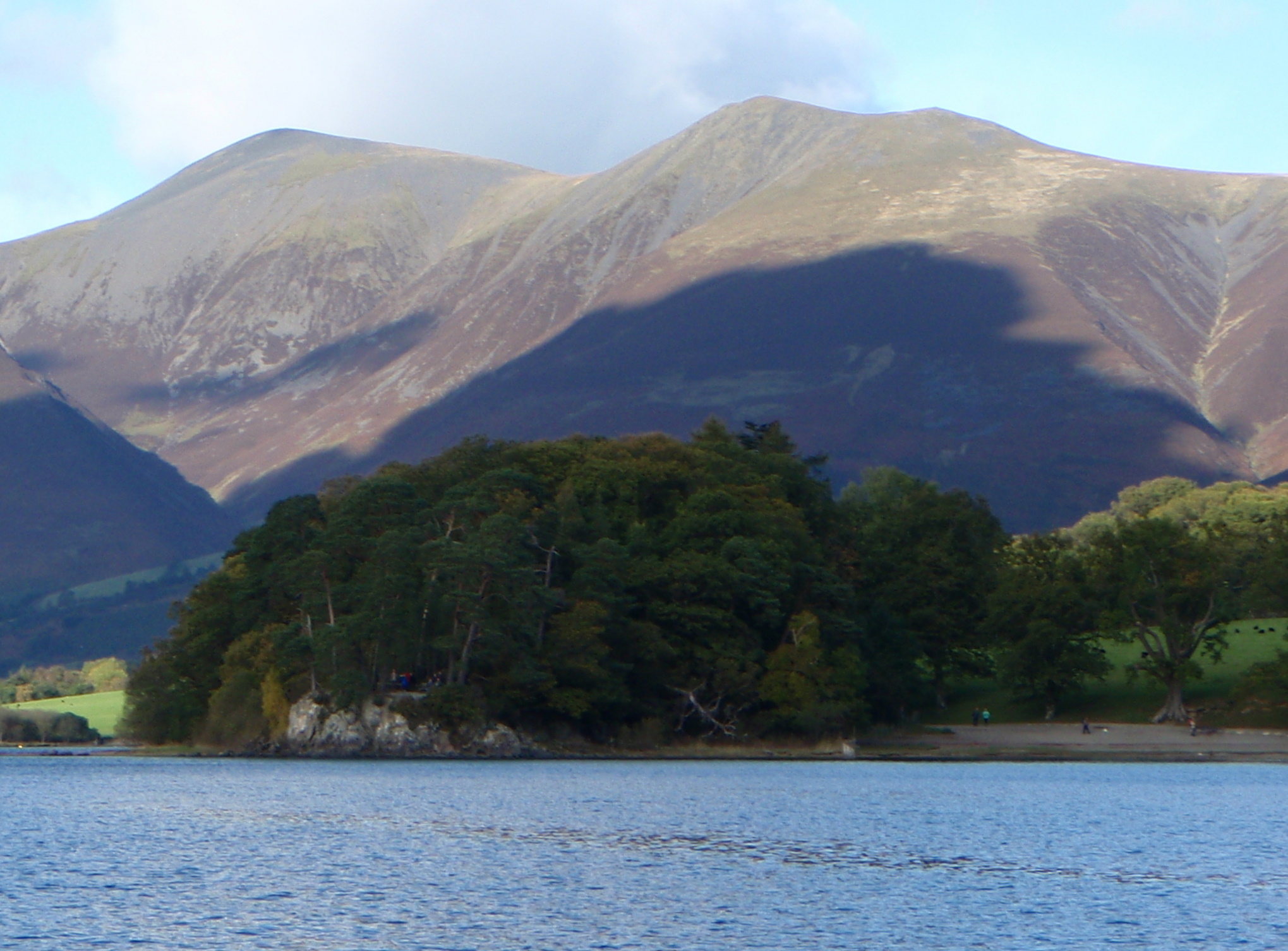
Friars' Crag seen from Derwentwater

Friars' Crag, sometimes spelled Friar's Crag or Friars Crag, is a promontory overlooking Derwentwater near Keswick, Cumbria, in the English Lake District. It is a popular site with visitors and was acquired for the public by the National Trust in the 1920s.

As well as its natural beauty, Friars' Crag is known for its literary and artistic associations with, among others, Robert Southey, J. M. W. Turner, John Ruskin and Arthur Ransome

== Background and description ==
The 7th-century priest and hermit Saint Herbert lived on an island in Derwentwater. Friars' Crag derives its name from its use as an embarkment point by monks making a pilgrimage to the island. Both Friars' Crag and St Herbert's Island are now owned by the National Trust. The crag is at the end of a promontory about half a mile south of the modern boat landing-stages at Keswick, and is reached by a footpath along the eastern side of the lake.

Friars' Crag has been valued as a beauty spot since at least the 18th century. The poet Robert Southey said of it, "If I had Aladdin's lamp, or Fortunatus's purse, I would here build myself a house". J. M. W. Turner painted the view from the crag in either the late 18th or early 19th century. The art critic and social reformer John Ruskin wrote of the spot:

"The first thing that I remember as an event in life was being taken by my nurse to the brow of Friars' Crag, Derwentwater. The intense joy mingled with awe that I had in looking through the hollows in the mossy roots over the crag into the dark lake has associated itself more or less with all twining roots of trees ever since".

Ruskin, a pioneer of the protection of the unspoiled beauty of the Lake District, said that the view from Friars' Crag "is one of the three or four most beautiful in Europe". In October 1900, nine months after his death, a monument to Ruskin was unveiled at the side of the path to Friars' Crag. The driving force behind the erection of the Ruskin memorial was Hardwicke Rawnsley, one of the three founders of the National Trust. He died in 1920, and in his memory the trust raised money to buy Friars' Crag and the surrounding land. A memorial to him was installed in 1922.

The children's author Arthur Ransome incorporated Friars' Crag into his Swallows and Amazons (1930), where it is given the name "Darien", the look-out point for the young crew of the Swallow.

View from Friars' Crag by J. M. W. Turner

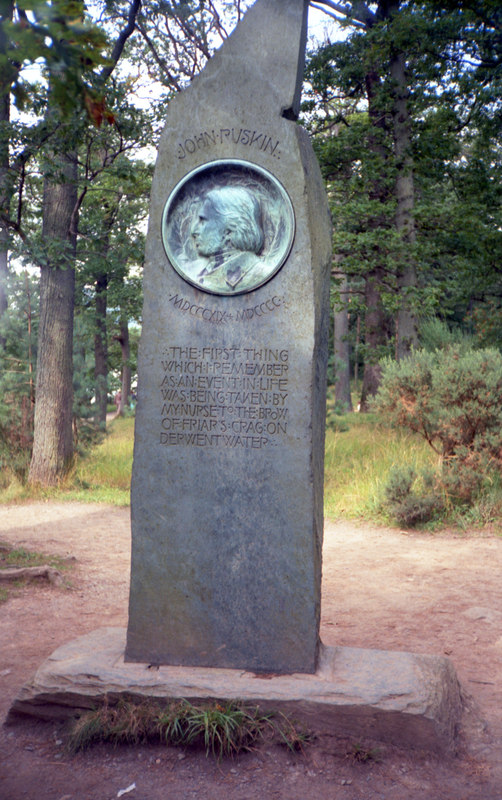
Memorial to John Ruskin at Friars' Crag

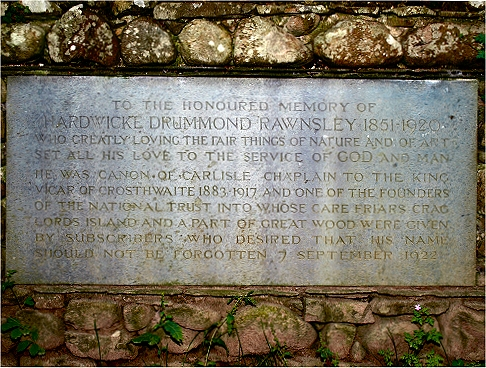
Memorial to Hardwicke Rawnsley

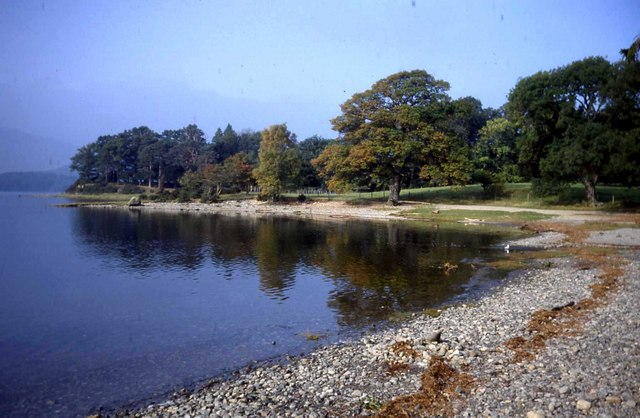
Friars' Crag from the lake shore looking north

== Sources ==
- Hall, S. C.; Mrs S. C. Hall (1866). "Memories of the Authors of the Age". The Art Journal. Vol. 28. Virtue. OCLC 10616356.
- Rawnsley, H. D. (1894). Literary Associations of English Lakes. Glasgow: MacLehose. OCLC 23309467.
- Rawnsley, H. D. (1901). Ruskin and the English Lakes. Glasgow: MacLehose. OCLC 1122786.
- Rawnsley, Eleanor (1923). Canon Rawnsley: An Account of his Life. Glasgow: MacLehose. OCLC 8213081.
- Shelbourn, Colin (2004). Waterside Walks in the Lake District. Wilmslow: Sigma Leisure. ISBN 978-1-85058-805-4.
