= Newlands Valley =

Valley in Cumbria, England

Coordinates: 54.57301°N 3.18487°W

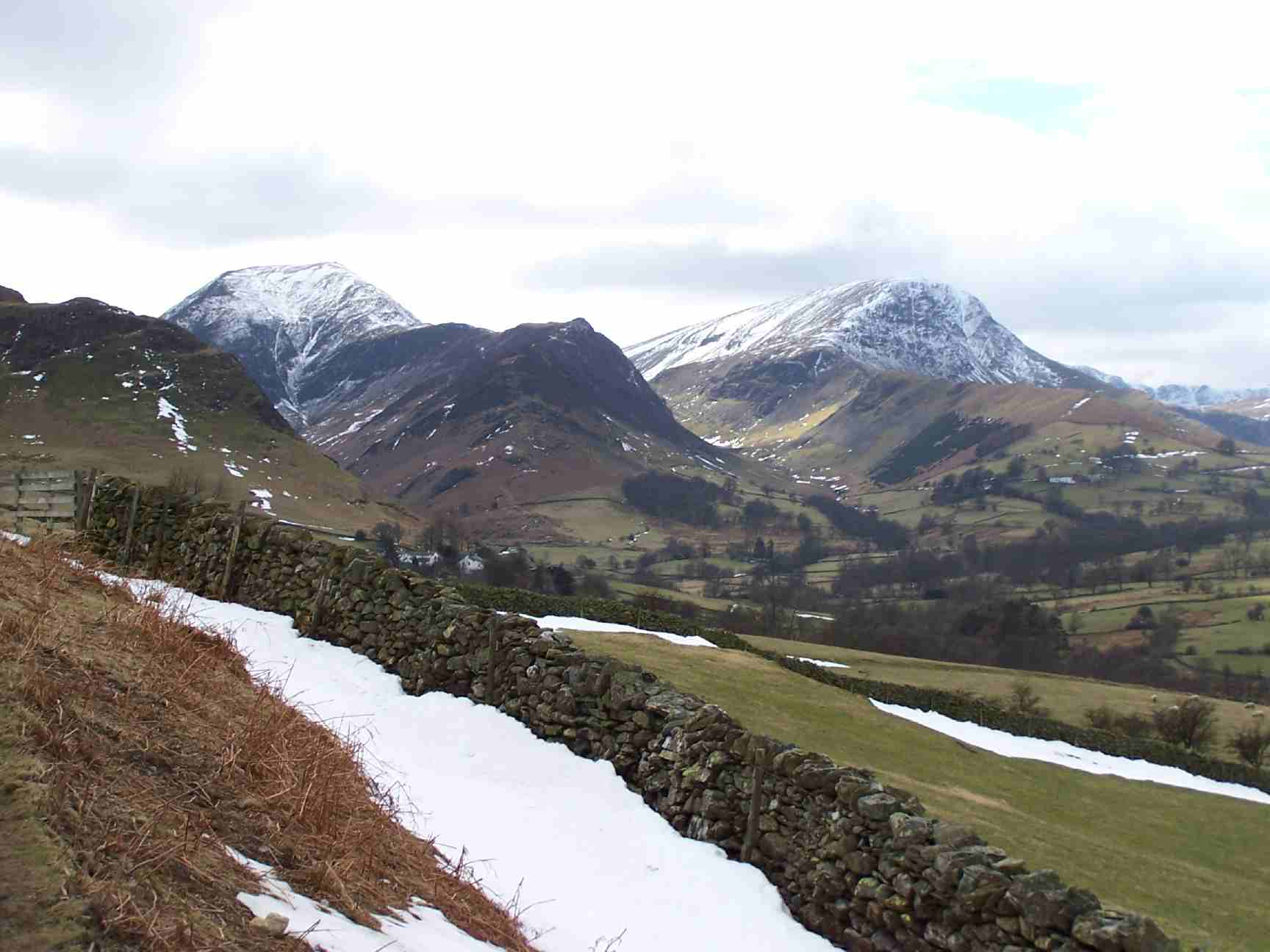
The fells of Hindscarth (left) and Robinson (right) at the head of the Newlands valley.

The Newlands Valley is in the Lake District National Park in Cumbria, England. It is regarded as one of the most picturesque and quiet valleys in the national park, even though it is situated very close to the popular tourist town of Keswick and the busy A66 road.

The valley forms part of the civil parish of Above Derwent, within the Borough of Allerdale.

== Early history ==
The earliest signs of human settlement in the valley have been found at Ullock, where evidence of a Bronze Age burial site has been found. The remains of a Celtic workshop were also found at Portinscale. Viking herdsmen arrived in Cumbria after 800 AD. Many of the present day place names in the Newlands valley have their origins from these early Norse settlers. The valley area was originally called Rogersat or Rogersyde which was derived from the Old Norse “Roger-Saetr”, which translates as Summer pasture belonging to Roger. The present day Newlands valley settlements of Keskadale, Skelgill, Birk Rigg, High Snab and Uzzicar all have their name origins from the early Viking settlers.

The name “Newlands” did not come into being until after the 13th century when it was used to describe the usable new land which had been created at the foot of the valley between Portinscale and Braithwaite by the draining of a large swampy and marshy area. At the start of the 14th century the rents paid by the tenant farmers in the valley started to rise steadily as the cultivated areas were extended and the population increased. Some of the families in the valley have lived in the area for hundreds of years, with the Fischers, Tickells, Thwaites, Graves and Maysons all mentioned in the manorial records from the 15th century and still living in the valley in the 20th century.

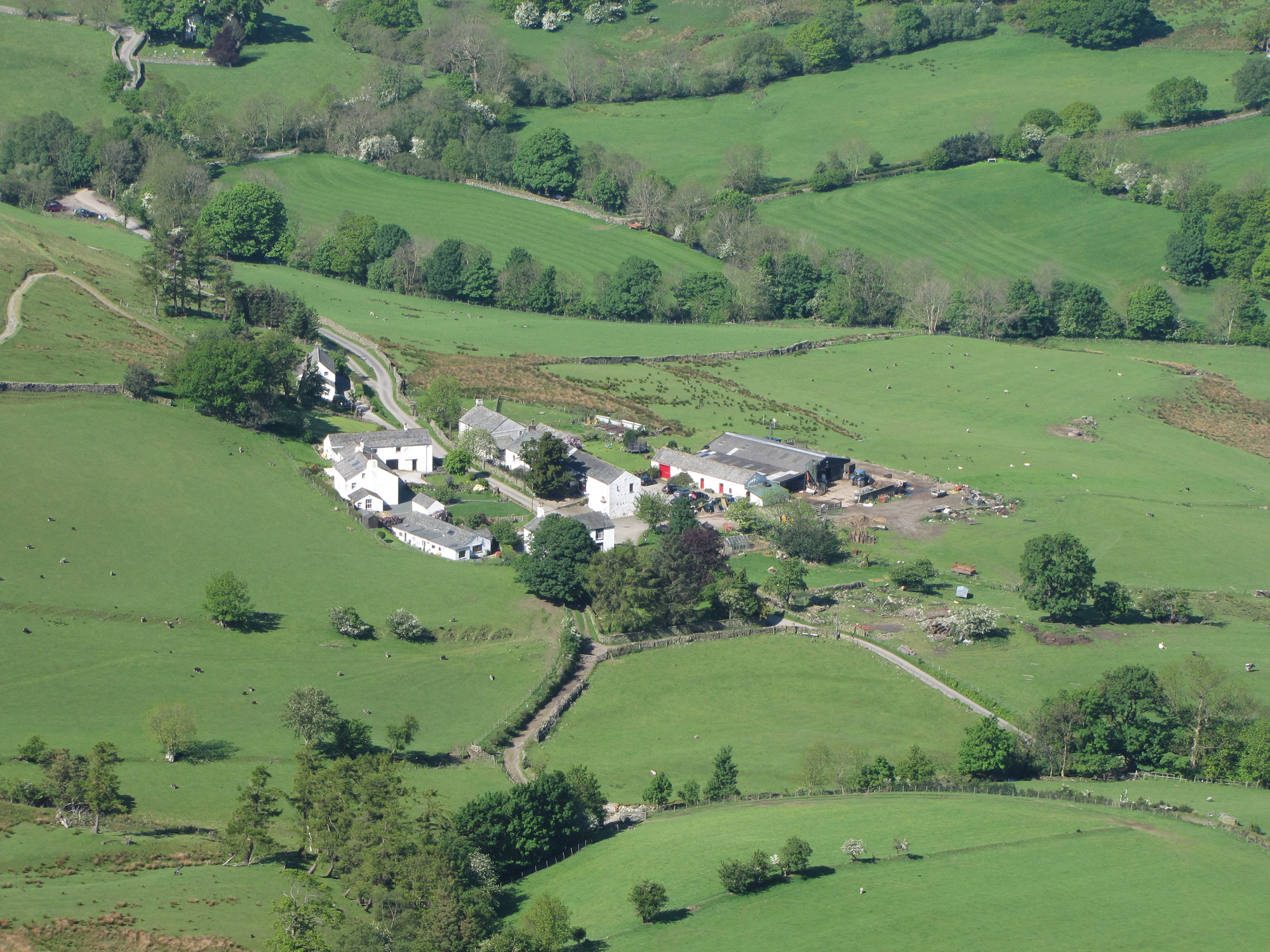
The hamlet of Little Town seen from Catbells. It consists of a farm and few cottages

== Settlements ==
The valley has a minor motor road that traverses its entire length; it starts at the village of Braithwaite on the A66 and continues over Newlands Hause to Buttermere. Another road starts at the hamlet of Portinscale (also on the A66) and joins the route from Braithwaite near the village of Stair. The valley is thinly populated, consisting mainly of farms and tourist accommodation. Stair is the main settlement in the valley. Demolition began in 2006 of Rigg Beck, the well-known "purple house" on the main Braithwaite–Buttermere road; this large Victorian house was for many years a source of cheap accommodation for visitors (including Ted Hughes, Tenzing Norgay, Doug Scott, Tom Courtenay and Bob Hoskins). The building was destroyed by fire on 30 June 2008. In its place now stands a new house built from grey stone.

Further up the valley is the hamlet of Little Town, which has been made famous by the writings of Beatrix Potter, whose 1905 children's book The Tale of Mrs. Tiggy-Winkle is based in the area and opens with the line "Once upon a time there was a little girl called Lucie, who lived at a farm called Little-town. She was a good little girl--only she was always losing her pocket- handkerchiefs!". Little Town consists of a farm and a few cottages, and is the site of the small whitewashed Newlands Church, which was originally built in the 16th century but had fallen into disrepair by the 19th century. It was gradually rebuilt over a number of years and was re-opened in 1885. The stained glass window on the east wall dates from 1845, while the south facing window is a memorial to a World War I soldier.

This chapel was visited by William Wordsworth in May 1826, inspiring him to write a stanza in his poem “To May”, the full poem being on display in the chapel. In 2000 the chapel underwent restoration. Little Town used to have its own school – before it was closed in 1967 – as well as its own pub, which closed and was converted to farm buildings many years ago. Skelgill, on the slopes of Catbells, is a farm dating back to the 14th century, which includes a 12-bedded camping barn for visitors. The most southerly habitation in the valley is Keskadale farm, a traditional sheep and beef cattle farm, which has been in the Harryman family for generations and also offers tourist accommodation. For car drivers, the Newlands valley ends at Newlands Hause at a height of 333 metres (1093 feet), where there is a car park at the foot of the slopes of Robinson; the Moss Force waterfall can be seen coming down from the fell. From the hause, the road descends steeply to Buttermere.

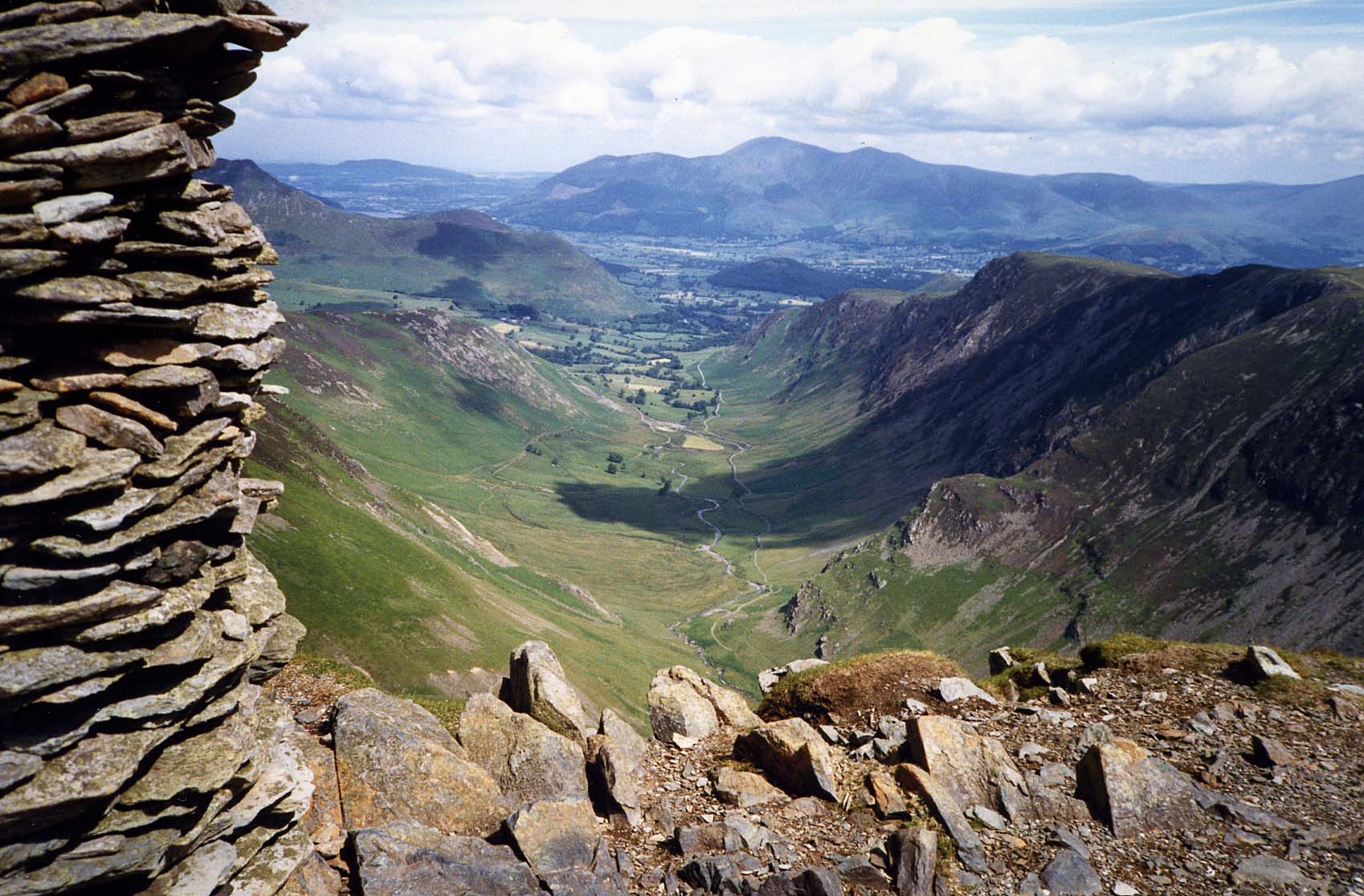
The Newlands valley with Skiddaw beyond from Dale Head.

== Mining ==
The Newlands Valley was extensively mined and quarried for many centuries; lead, copper, silver and even gold have been extracted over the years. The most famous mine in the Lake District is situated in Newlands. This is the Goldscope mine, on the lower slopes of Hindscarth near Low Snab farm, which has operated since the 16th century. It yielded such large amounts of lead and copper that it was called “Gottesgab” (God's Gift) by the German miners brought over to develop the mine in its early days. The mine closed at the end of the 19th century, not because it was exhausted but because the mine's main shaft had gone so deep it had become uneconomic to pump the water from it. Other well-known mines in the valley are Barrow lead mine, on the slopes of Barrow, which closed in 1888; the Yewthwaite lead mine, which occupies a small valley between the fells of Catbells and Maiden Moor and ceased production in 1893; and the long-closed Dale Head copper mine, established by German miners in Elizabethan times.

== Landscape and scenery ==
The scenery of the Newlands valley consists of farmland in the valley bottom and soaring fells above. Fells that have their foot in the valley include Barrow, Causey Pike, Catbells, Ard Crags, Knott Rigg, Maiden Moor, High Spy, Dale Head, Hindscarth and Robinson. The quality of the fell walking is very good; the Newlands horseshoe is a 14-kilometre walk, starting and finishing at Little Town, with over 1,000 metres of ascent, taking in most of the 2,000-foot peaks at the head of the valley. On the steep slopes of Ard Crags above Keskadale farm is Keskadale Oakwood, which is an ancient oak and alder woodland, a Site of Special Scientific Interest and a Special Area of Conservation. It has an area of 50 hectares and has been fenced off for an initial period of 15 years to encourage natural regeneration and keep out grazing animals.

== See also ==
- Coledale horseshoe
- Newlands horseshoe
