= High Spy =

Mountain in the English Lake District, Cumbria, England

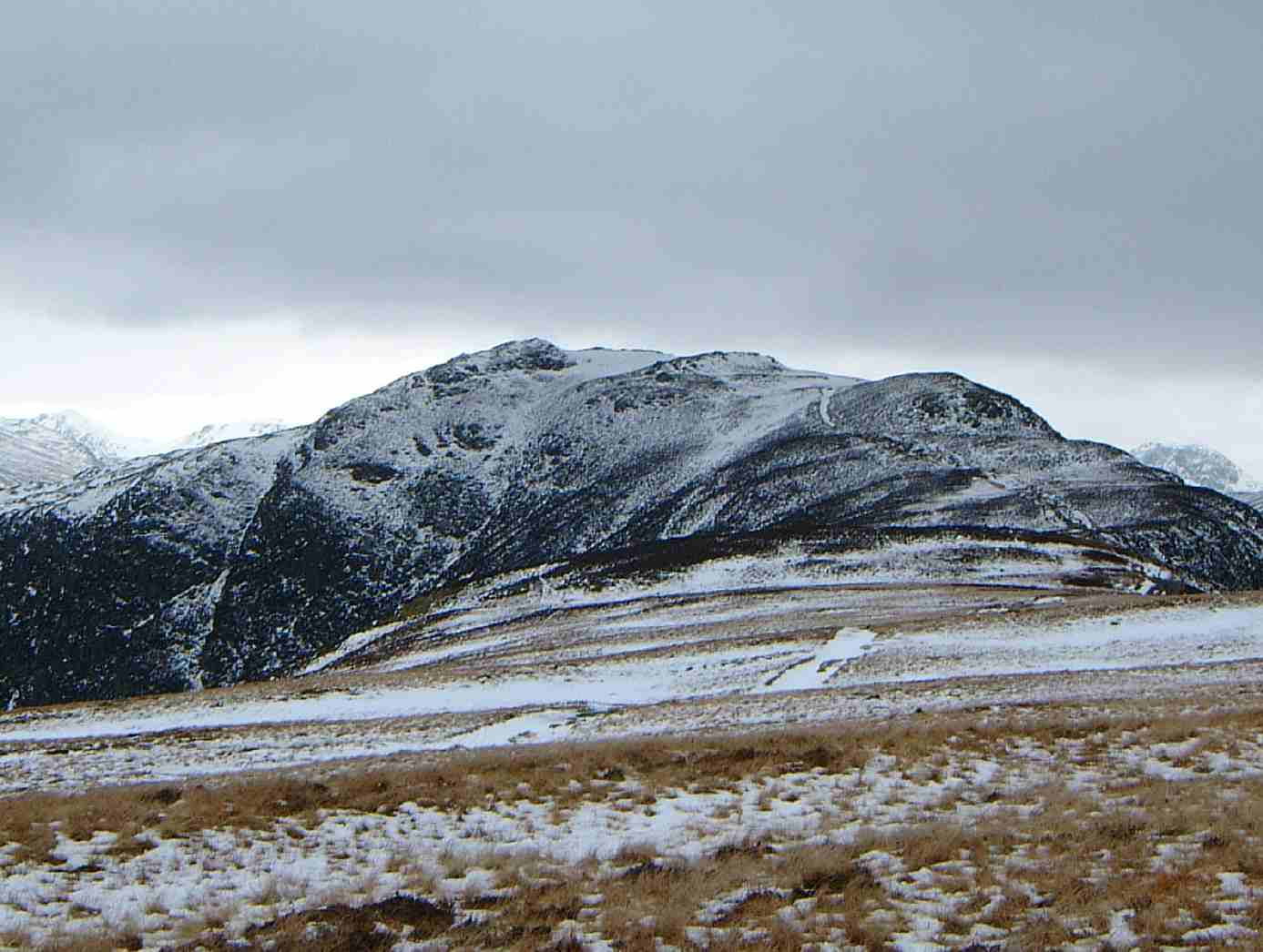
- High Spy from the fell of Maiden Moor; 2 km to the north

Highest point
- Elevation: 653 m (2,142 ft)
- Prominence: c. 148 metres (486 feet)
- Parent peak: Dale Head
- Listing: Wainwright, Hewitt, Nuttall
- Coordinates: 54°32′02″N 3°11′06″W

Naming
- English translation: High Look Out
- Language of name: Old English

Geography
- Location within the Lake District
- Location: Cumbria, England
- Parent range: Lake District, North Western Fells
- OS grid: NY234162
- Topo map: OS Landranger 89, 90 OS Explore Outdoor Leisure 4

Listed summits of High Spy
Name	Grid ref	Height	Status
High Spy North Top	NY236171	634 m (2,080 ft)	Nuttall

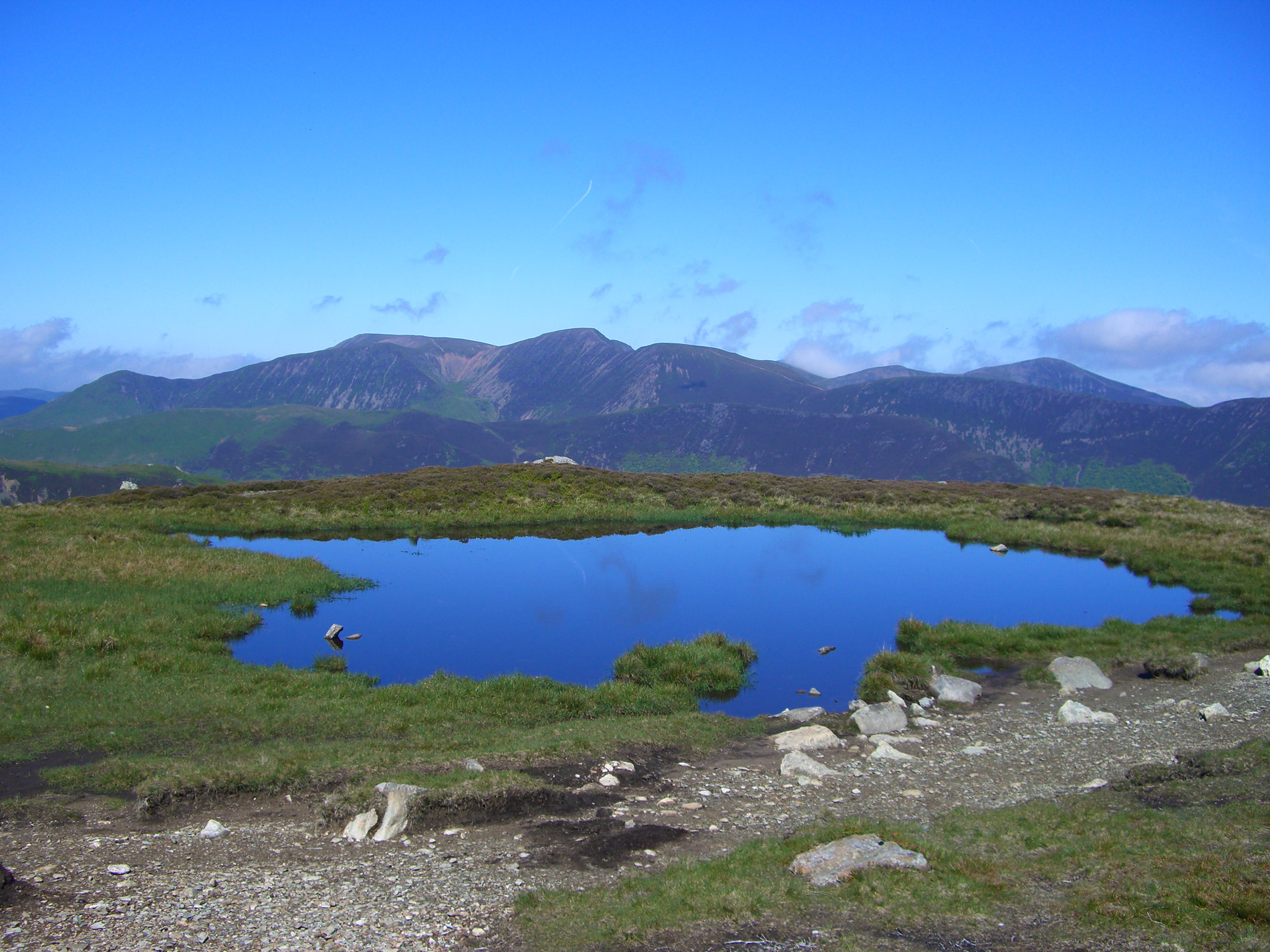
View west to the Grasmoor group of hills from the small tarn on the summit ridge.

High Spy is a fell in the English Lake District it is situated on the ridge that separates the Newlands Valley from Borrowdale, eight kilometres (five miles) south of Keswick.

== Topography ==
The fell reaches a height of 653 metres (2,142 feet) and is defended by crags to the east and west as it falls away steeply to the valleys. It is a distinctive fell that has 148 metres (486 feet) of topographic prominence from the higher adjoining fell of Dale Head and so misses being a Marilyn by only two metres. Geologically the fell is made up of Borrowdale Volcanics. The meaning of the fell's name is obscure but may mean a “lookout post”, referring to some lost fort in the area. In the past it has been known as Scawdel Fell and Lobstone Band and these names are still used on maps to label other parts of the fell.

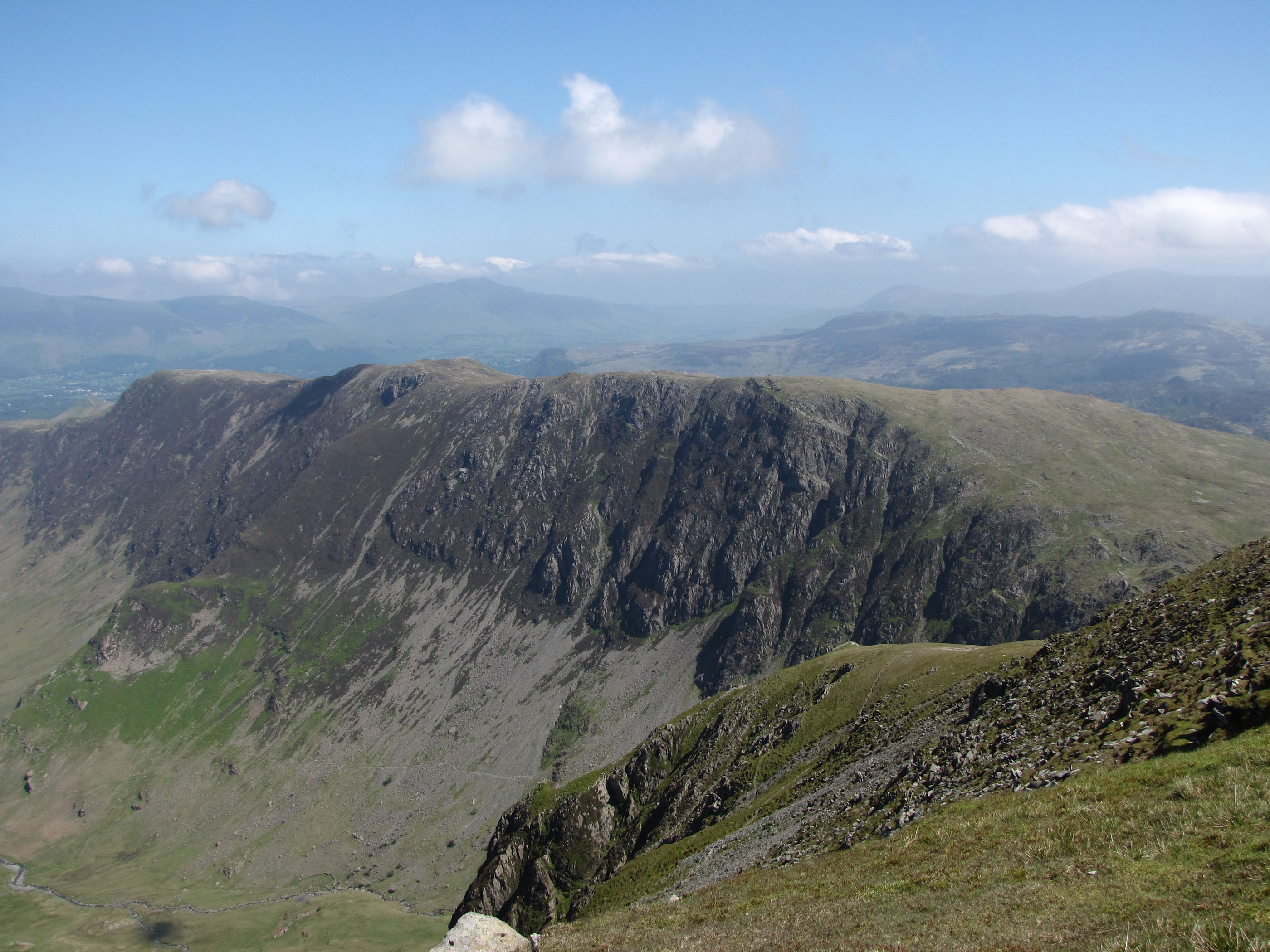
Seen from the slopes of Dale Head. Eel Crags falls steeply to the Newlands Valley

The summit has an impressive cairn which has been known to be vandalised on occasions but always seems to gets rebuilt by other walkers. The top of the fell is relatively flat for a distance of about 2.5 kilometres (1 1/2 miles) in a north-to-south direction and the impressive Eel Crags fall away vertically on the Newlands side of the fell, these crags are popular with rock climbers with the quality of the rock being very good. High Spy North Top stands almost a kilometre north of the main top; it has a height of 634 metres (2,080 feet) and is also classed as a Nuttall, with a fine view of Derwent Water. 600 metres (660 yards) north of the main summit is a small unnamed tarn.

== Ascents ==
High Spy is often climbed as part of the Newlands Horseshoe ridge walk but can be ascended directly despite being defended by crags on both its Newlands and Borrowdale sides. From Borrowdale a path goes from Rosthwaite and climbs through the disused Rigg Head Quarries to reach the col linking High Spy to Dale Head and then up the south ridge to the summit passing a small unnamed tarn just before the top. From this side it is also possible to start from Grange and use an old drove road to get through the barrier of Blea Crag and then approach the summit. A scrambling route also starts from Grange, going via Hollows Farm it tackles the rocky rake of Nitting Haws directly. From Little Town in the Newlands valley an old mine road zig zags up to the col between the fell and Dale Head to then reach the top by the south ridge.

== Mining ==
The latter route passes the Castlenook lead mine at the foot of the fell on the Newlands side, this mine, formerly owned by the Company of Mines Royal, started production in the 1860s and continued until 1918 when cheaper imports led to its closure. There are also signs of trial levels higher up the steep slope.
