= Maiden Moor =

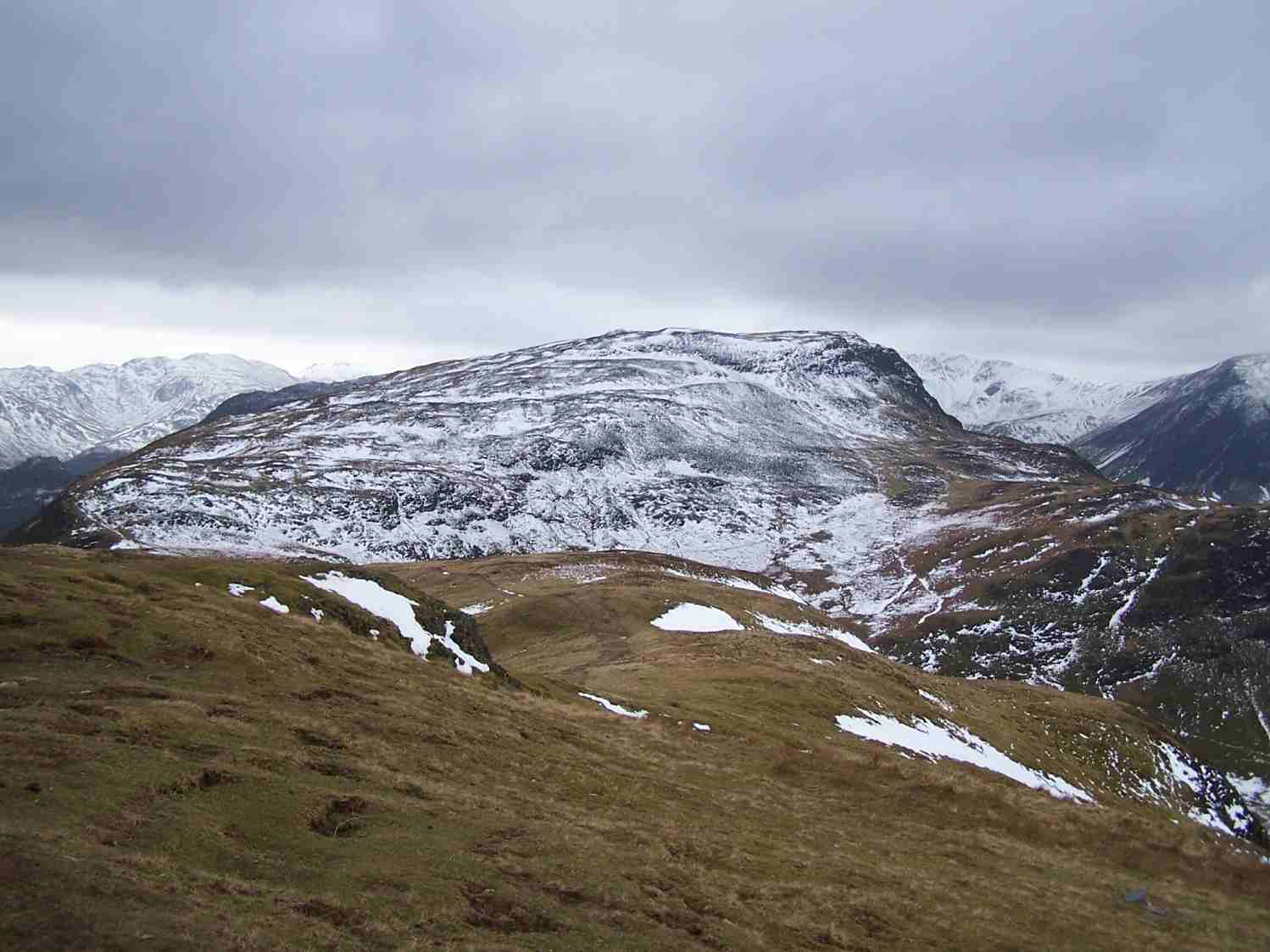
- Maiden Moor seen from the summit of Catbells

Highest point
- Elevation: 576 m (1,890 ft)
- Prominence: 16 m (52 ft)
- Parent peak: High Spy north top
- Listing: Wainwright
- Coordinates: 54°33′12″N 3°10′58″W

Geography
- Location within the Lake District
- Location: Cumbria, England
- Parent range: Lake District, North Western Fells
- OS grid: NY236182
- Topo map: OS Landranger 89, 90 OS Explorer Outdoor Leisure 4

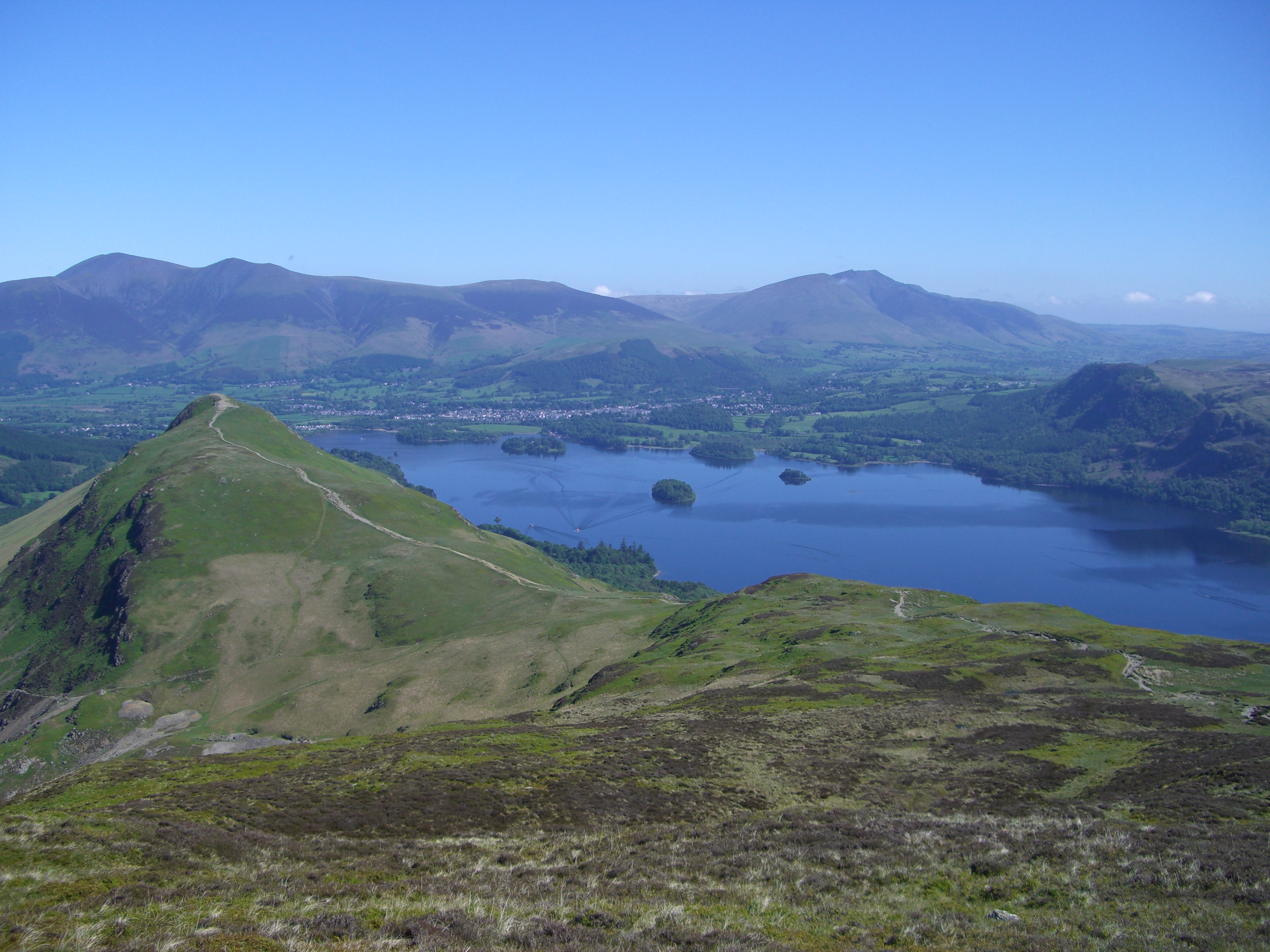
Looking north from Maiden Moor to Catbells and Derwentwater.

Maiden Moor is a fell in the English Lake District, it stands six kilometres (3 3/4 miles) south of the town of Keswick and is part of the high ground that separates the Newlands Valley and Borrowdale; it has a modest height of 576 m (1,890 ft) and so fails to be mentioned on many UK mountain lists but it does have a separate chapter in Alfred Wainwright’s Pictorial Guide to the Lakeland Fells.

== Name ==
The meaning of the fell's name is obscure; the name "Maiden" is given to many prehistoric hill forts but there is no evidence that a hill fort ever existed on the fell, it may refer to a place where games or rituals were played where maidens took part.

== Topography ==
The fell's main natural features are Bull Crag which lies below the summit on the Newlands side and the hollow of Yewthwaite Combe which stands beneath the col linking the fell with Catbells on the Newlands side.

== Geology ==
The Maiden Moor ridge is an example of the Buttermere Formation, an olistostrome of disrupted, sheared and folded mudstone, siltstone and sandstone.

== Mining and Mrs Tiggy-Winkle ==
The Combe is the site of the disused Yewthwaite lead mine and there are extensive spoil heaps and old adits and shafts. The mine opened in the late 18th century and closed in 1893. This mine area was made famous by Beatrix Potter as the location of the story "The Tale of Mrs. Tiggy-Winkle", the story she dedicated to Lucy Carr, daughter of the vicar of Newlands Church, Mrs. Tiggy-Winkle is supposed to have lived in one of the holes in the fell above the mine.

== Ascents ==
Maiden Moor stands between two well known fells (Catbells and High Spy) and is part of the popular Newlands horseshoe walk, so it is often approached along the ridge from other fells by walkers whose main objective is a longer walk. However the fell can be climbed directly from Grange in Borrowdale and Little Town in the Newlands valley. Both routes climb to the col (Hause Gate) linking the fell to Catbells and then ascend by the northern ridge. Approaching the top of the fell the path splits with the main path continuing to High Spy without (unusually) going over the highest point of the fell. The right hand fork follows the escarpment above Newlands to reach the summit which is crowned by a small cairn.

== Summit ==
There is no easy way of discerning the exact highest point as the top is a level grassy plateau. There are excellent views across the Newlands valley to the Coledale fells and beyond.

== See also ==
- List of Wainwrights
