= Olistostrome =

Type of chaotic sedimentary deposit

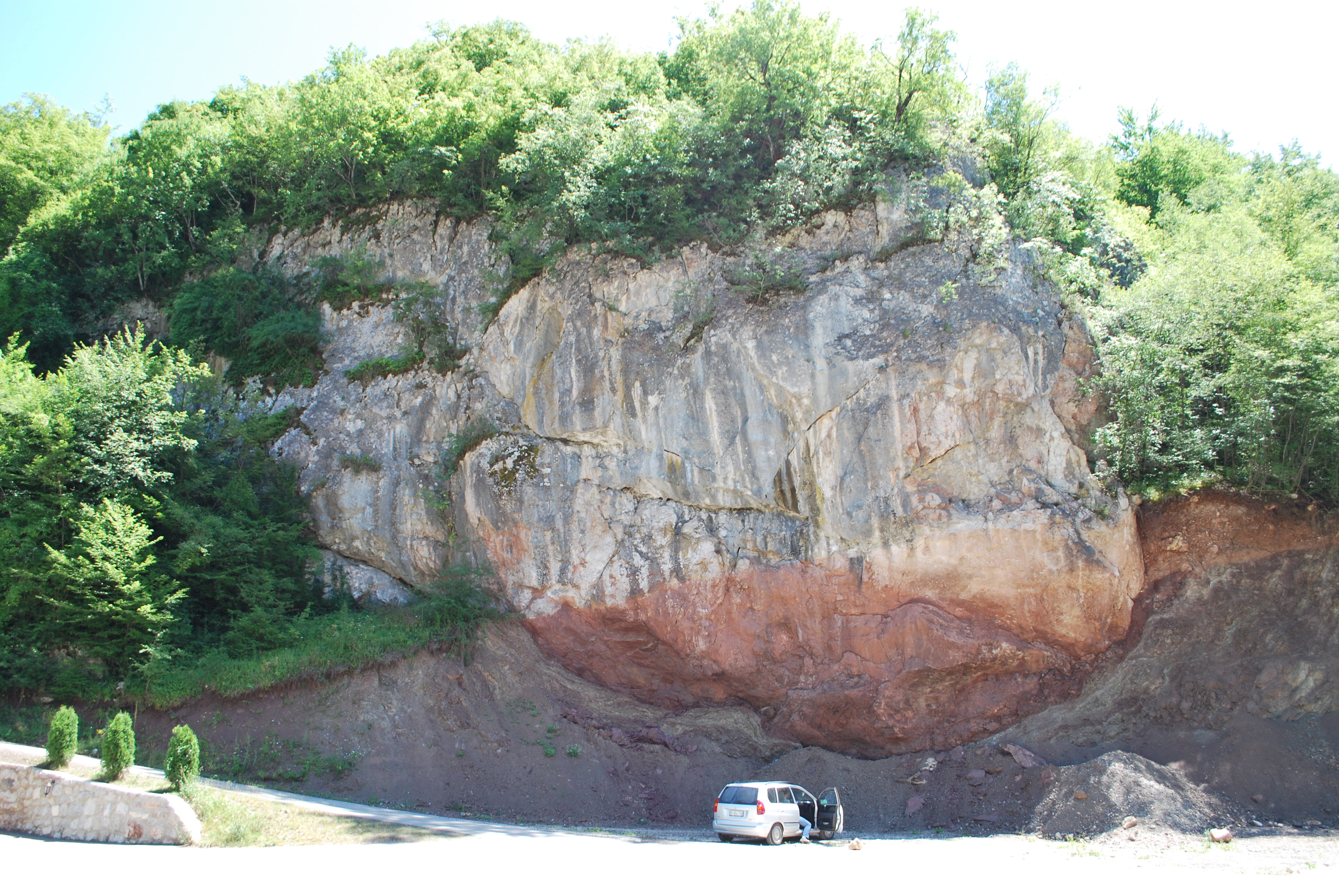
Roadside cross-section of a large olistolith in the ophiolithic melange, Western Vardar Ophiolithic Unit of Serbia

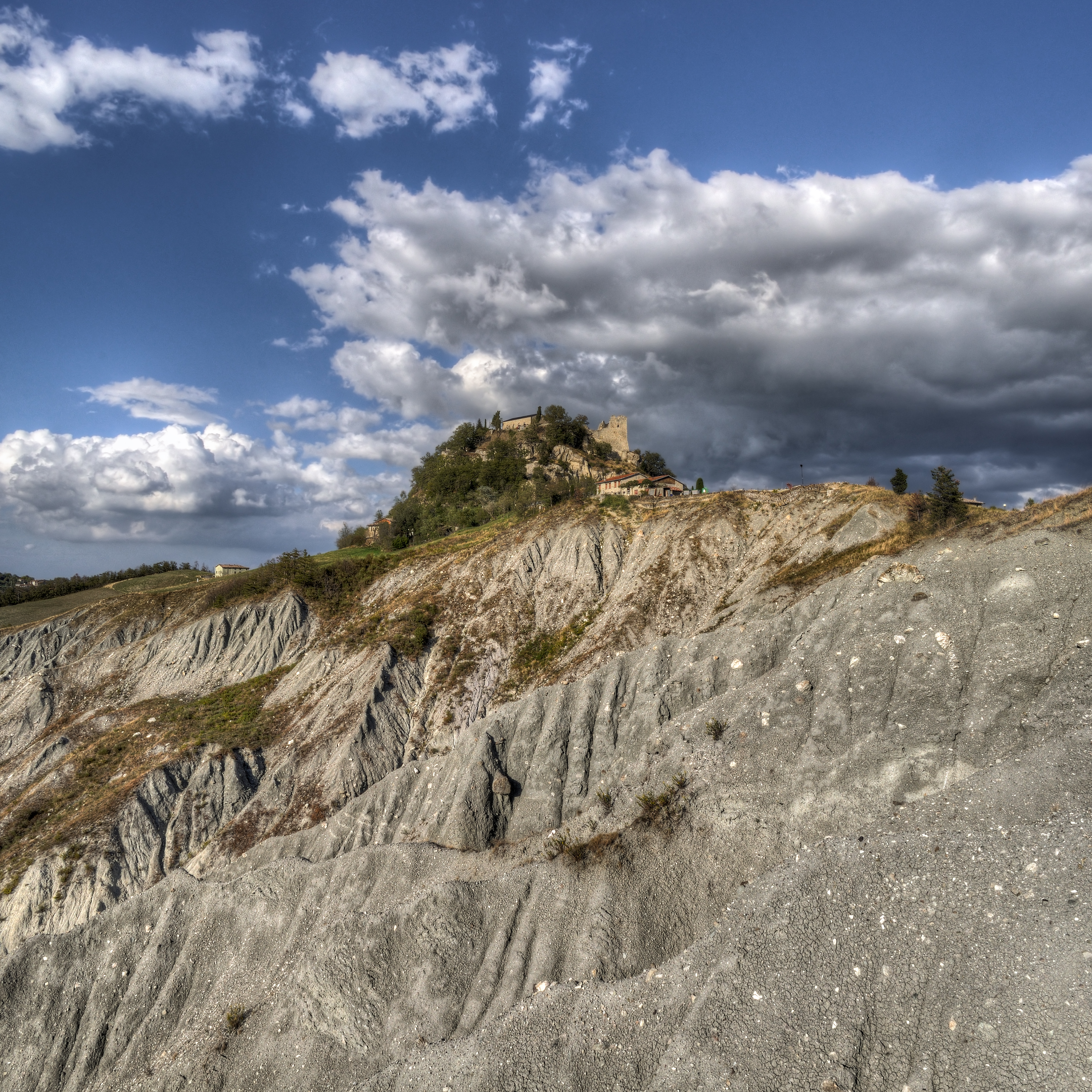
The eroded Miocene olistostrome at Canossa, Italy

An olistostrome is a sedimentary deposit composed of a chaotic mass of heterogeneous material, such as blocks and mud, known as olistoliths, that accumulates as a semifluid body by submarine gravity sliding or slumping of the unconsolidated sediments. It is a mappable stratigraphic unit which lacks true bedding, but is intercalated amongst normal bedding sequences, as in the Cenozoic basin of central Sicily. The term olistostrome is derived from the Greek olistomai (to slide) and stroma (accumulation).

== See also ==
- Submarine landslide
