= Derwentwater =

Lake in the Lake District, England

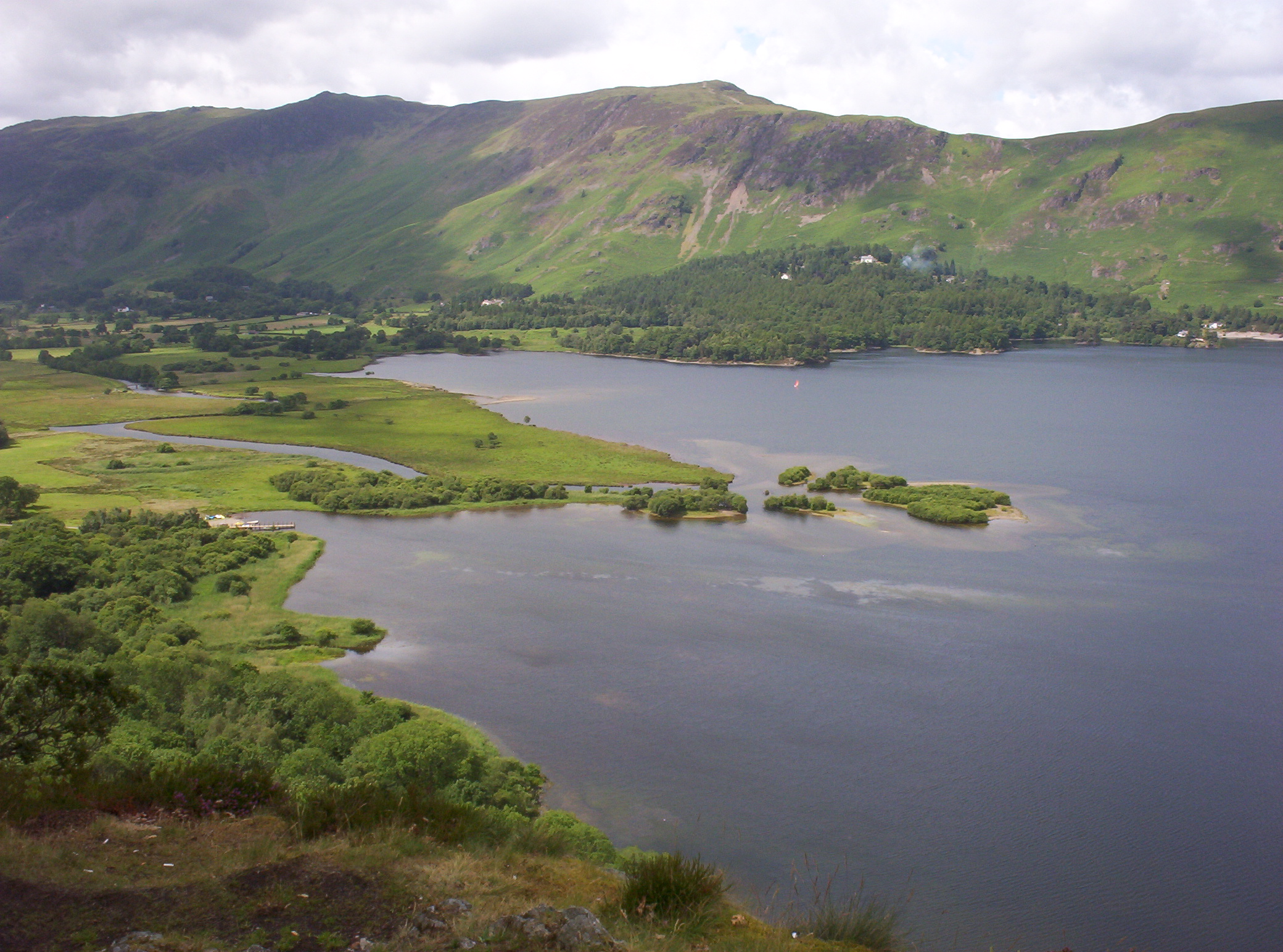
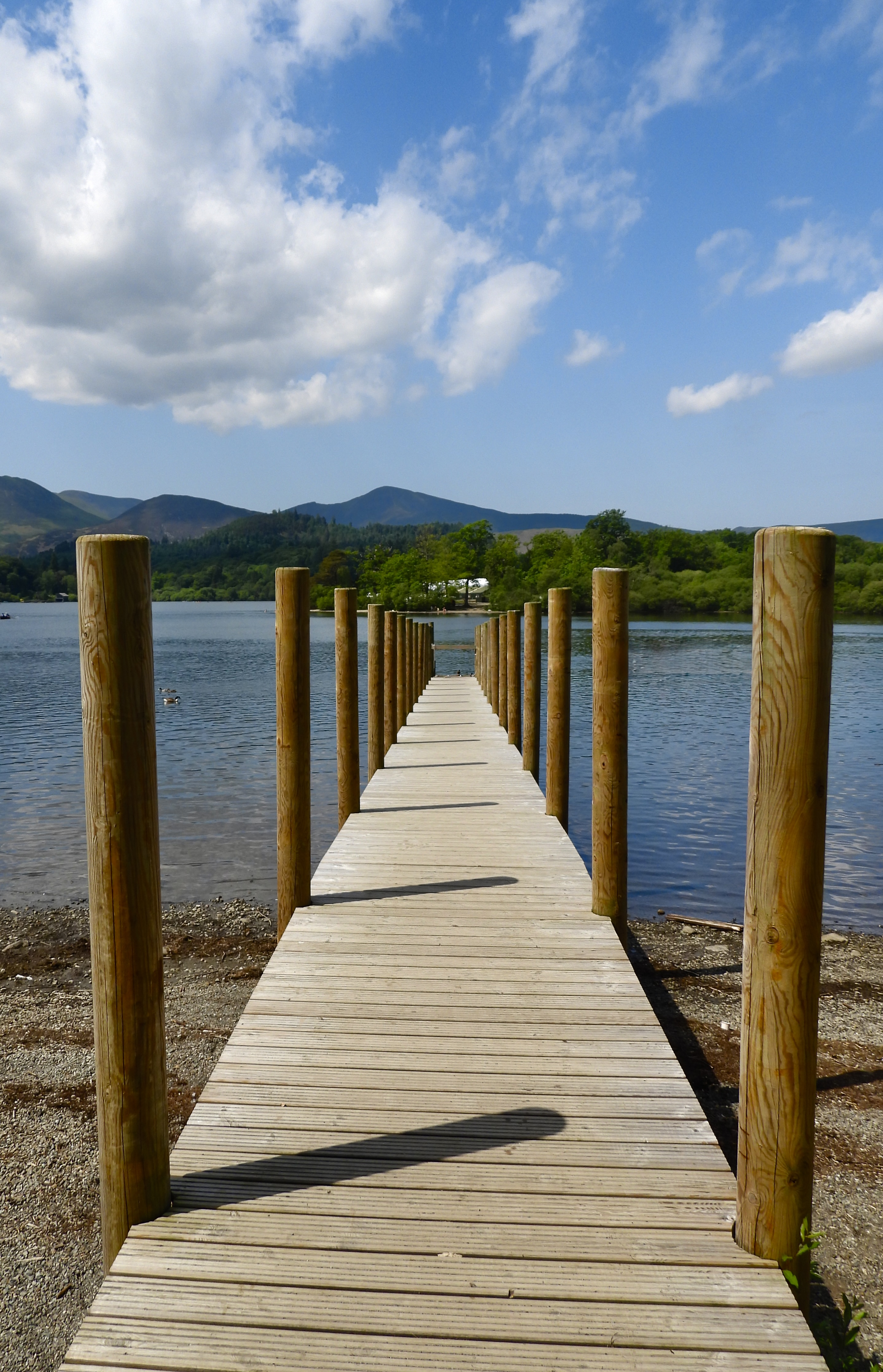
- Derwentwater Walking on a wooden board boat pier at Derwentwater.

- Location in the Lake District National Park Location in Allerdale, Cumbria
- Location: Lake District, England
- Coordinates: 54°35′N 3°09′W
- Primary inflows: River Derwent, Watendlath Beck, Brockle Beck
- Primary outflows: River Derwent
- Basin countries: United Kingdom
- Max. length: 4.6 km (2.9 mi)
- Max. width: 1.91 km (1 mi 329 yd)
- Surface area: 2 sq mi (5 km^{2})
- Average depth: 5.5 m (18 ft 1 in)
- Max. depth: 22 m (72 ft)
- Water volume: 29×10^{6} m^{3} (1,000×10^{6} cu ft)
- Residence time: 55 days
- Shore length^{1}: 9.5 mi (15.3 km)
- Surface elevation: 75 m (246 ft)
- Islands: 4 plus 9 small (13)
- ^{1} Shore length is not a well-defined measure.

Derwentwater, or Derwent Water, is a lake in the Lake District in North West England, immediately south of Keswick.

Derwentwater is in the unitary authority of Cumberland and is the third largest lake by area in the region, after Windermere and Ullswater. It has a length of 4.6 kilometres (2.9 mi), a maximum width of 1.91 kilometres (1.19 mi), and an area of 5.4 square kilometres (2.1 sq mi). Its primary inflow and outflow is the River Derwent, which also flows through Bassenthwaite Lake before reaching the Irish Sea at Workington.

There are four main islands within the lake: Derwent Island, Lord's Island, Rampsholme Island, and St Herbert's Island all of which are owned and managed by the National Trust and one of which is inhabited.

Derwentwater is a place of considerable scenic value. It is surrounded by hills (known locally as fells), and many of the slopes facing Derwentwater are extensively wooded. A regular passenger launch operates on the lake, taking passengers between various landing stages. There are seven lakeside marinas, the most popular stops being Keswick, Portinscale and the Lodore Falls, from which boats may be hired. Recreational walking is a major tourist activity in the area and there is an extensive network of footpaths in the hills and woods surrounding the lake.

The Keswick to Borrowdale road runs along the eastern shore of the lake and carries a regular bus service. There is a lesser, or unclassified, road along the western shore connecting the villages of Grange and Portinscale.

Derwentwater gave its name to the Earldom of Derwentwater.

From 2008 to 2014, the lake was believed to be the last remaining native habitat of the vendace (Coregonus vandesius) fish from the four originally known sites: Bassenthwaite Lake and Derwentwater in the Lake District, and the Castle Loch & Mill Loch in Lochmaben. However, a breeding population was discovered at Bassenthwaite Lake by conservationists in September 2014. The lake (and many others) is polluted with the invasive New Zealand Pigmyweed.

== Toponymy ==
'Derwent' is " '(River) with oak trees', traditionally explained from Brit." (i.e.: Brythonic Celtic) or Old Welsh, " 'derwā' 'oak' plus suffixes, hence of the same origin as other English rivers named Derwent, Darwen, Darent and Dart...The river gave its name to Derwent Water (which was also known as the 'Lake of Derwent', 'Keswick Lake', or 'Keswick Water' in the 18th-19th centuries)...". Plus "OE 'wæter', with the meaning probably influenced by its ON relative 'vatn'."

== Derwentwater's islands ==
There are numerous islands in Derwentwater, the largest being Derwent Island, Lord's Island, St Herbert's Island, Rampsholme Island, Park Neb, Otter Island and Otterbield Island. There is a house on Derwent Island.

St. Herbert's Island is named after a 7th-century hermit priest; Herbert of Derwentwater.

== In art and literature ==
Letitia Elizabeth Landon's poetical illustration Derwent Water is attached to a plate of Derwent Water, from the Castle Head, Cumberland (artist Thomas Allom) in Fisher's Drawing Room Scrap Book, 1837.

== In popular culture ==
A slightly cropped and colour hue-edited real photo with an open view of the Derwentwater was used by Team Silent as a backdrop image at the very beginning of the Konami's "Silent Hill 2" video game, to serve as a higher ground touristic observational viewpoint of the fictional "Toluca Lake" (not to be confused with Toluca Lake, Los Angeles) in the local area encompassing the fictional eponymous town of "Silent Hill", Maine. Derwentwater was used in the 2018 video game Forza Horizon 4. The album artwork for the 2010 album Black Sands by Bonobo features a photograph taken of Derwentwater. The tower in the background is located in Castlerigg (54°35′29.95″N 3°7′3.43″WCoordinates: 54°35′29.95″N 3°7′3.43″W). On his album Republic of Geordieland, singer-songwriter Richard Dawson has a song titled "Derwentwater Farewell." Derwentwater was used as the principal location for the planet Takodana in the sci fi movie sequel Star Wars: The Force Awakens.

== Panoramas ==
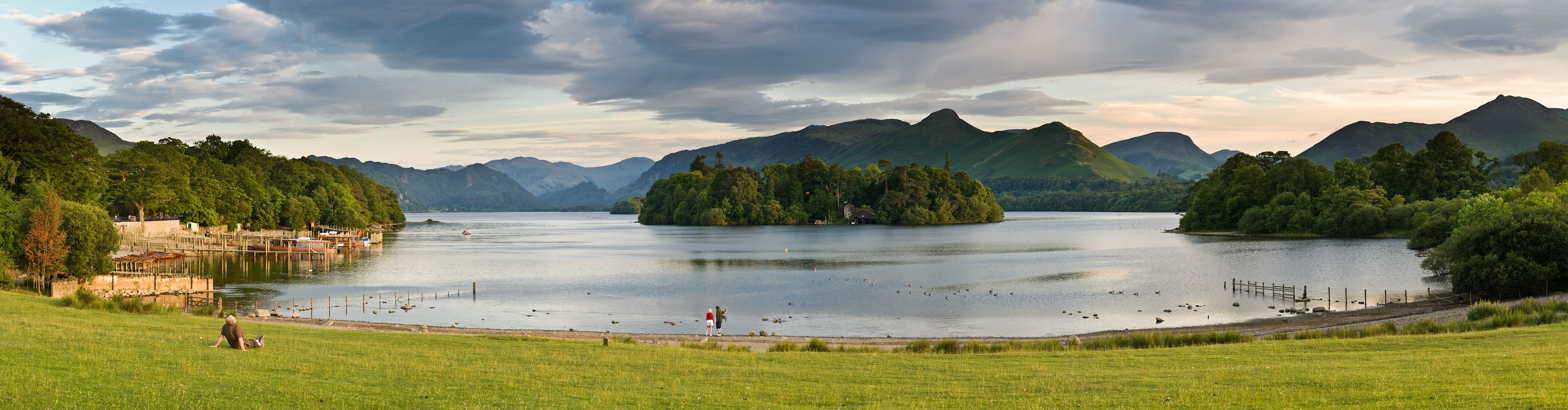
Derwentwater from the northern shore near Keswick
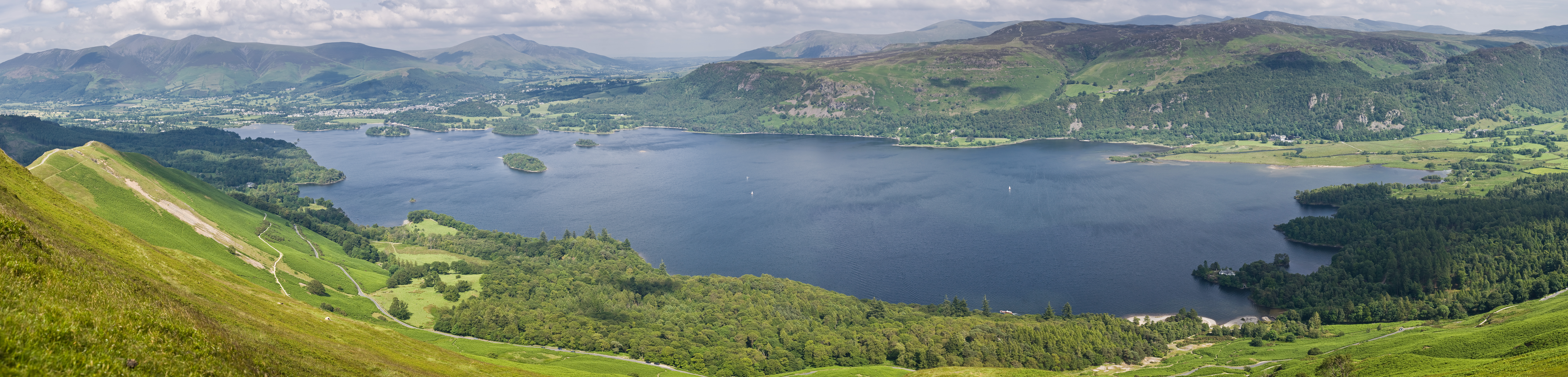
A panoramic view of Derwentwater from Cat Bells on the western side

== Gallery ==
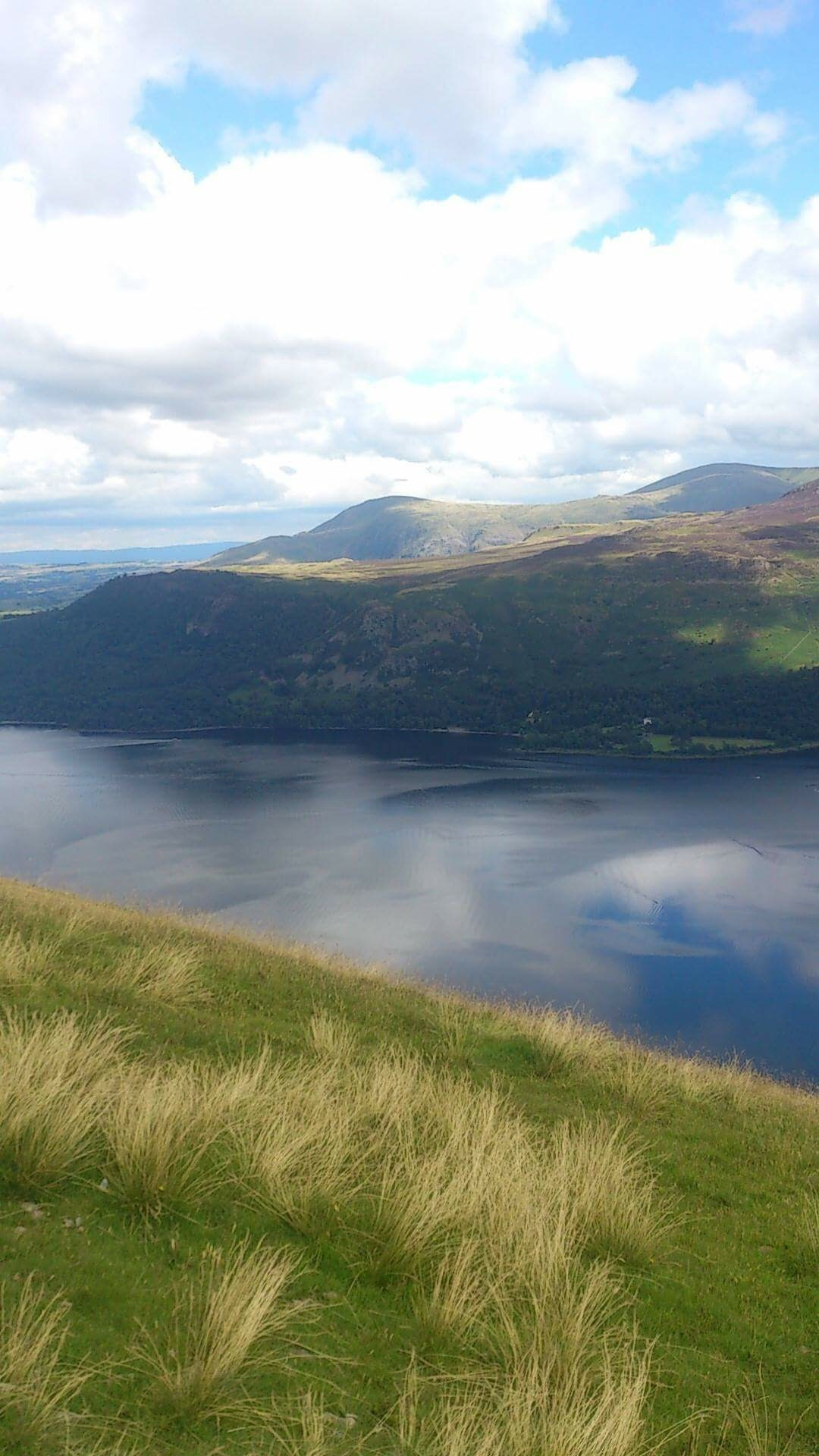
From Cat Bells

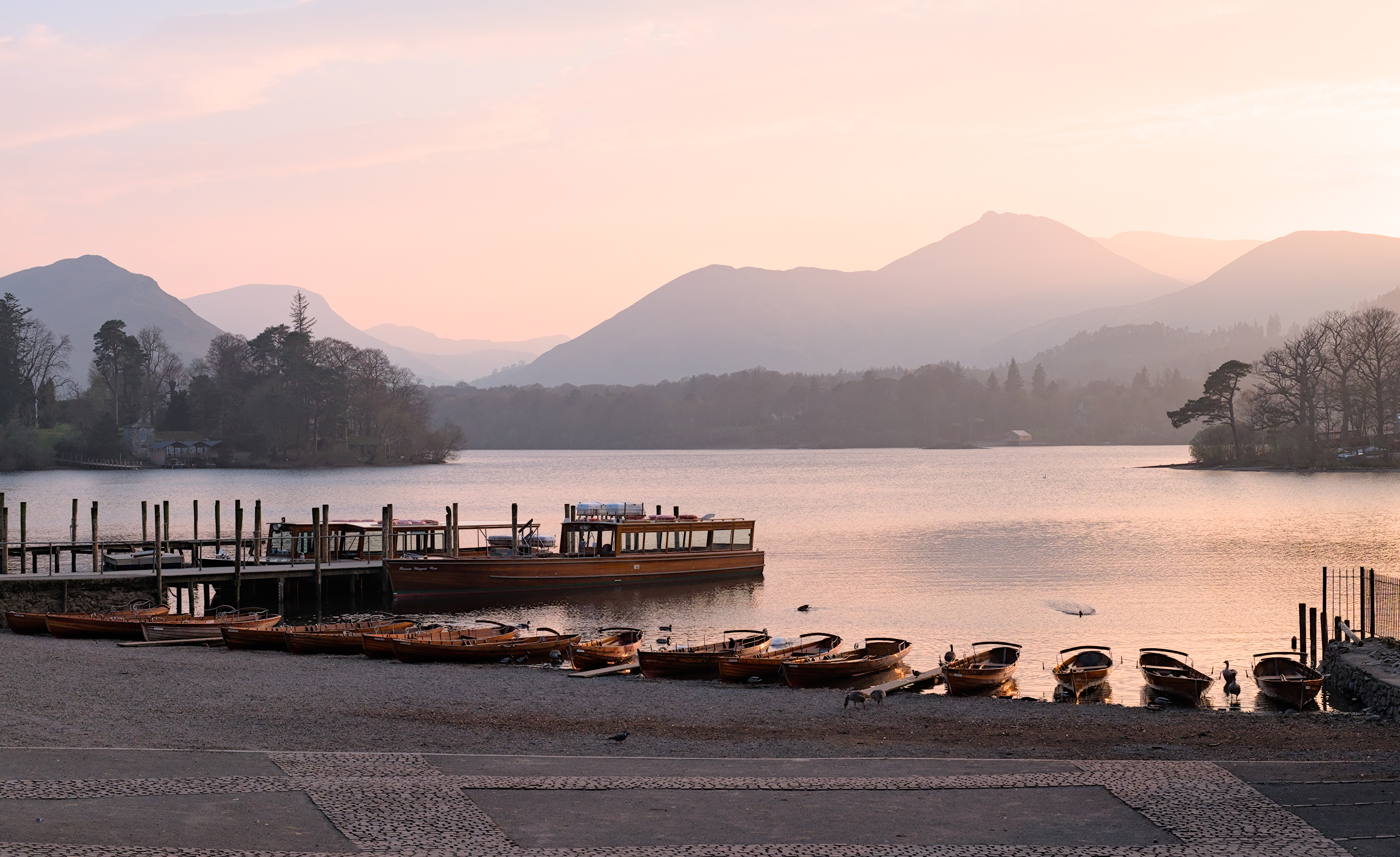
Keswick ferry terminal

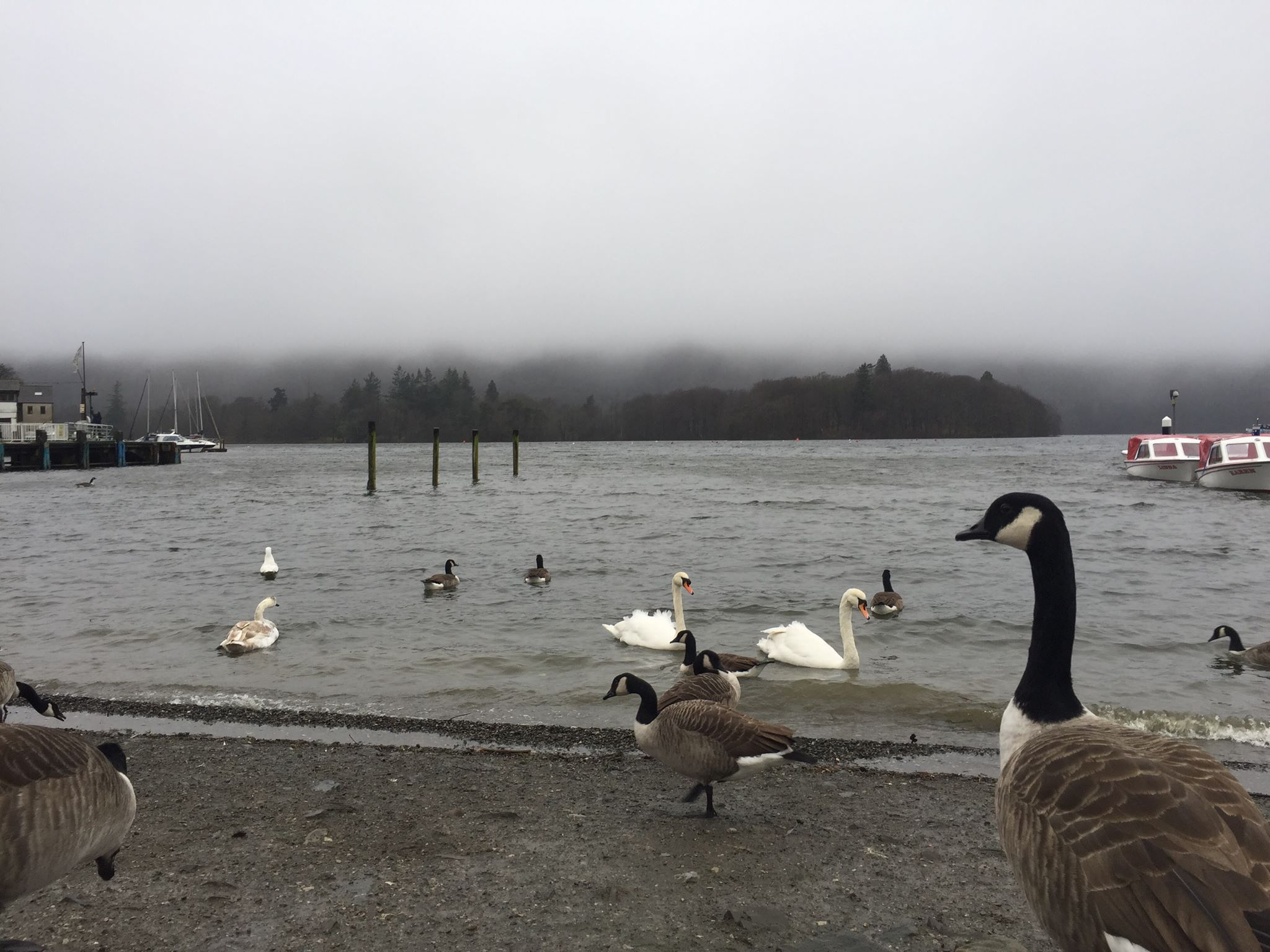

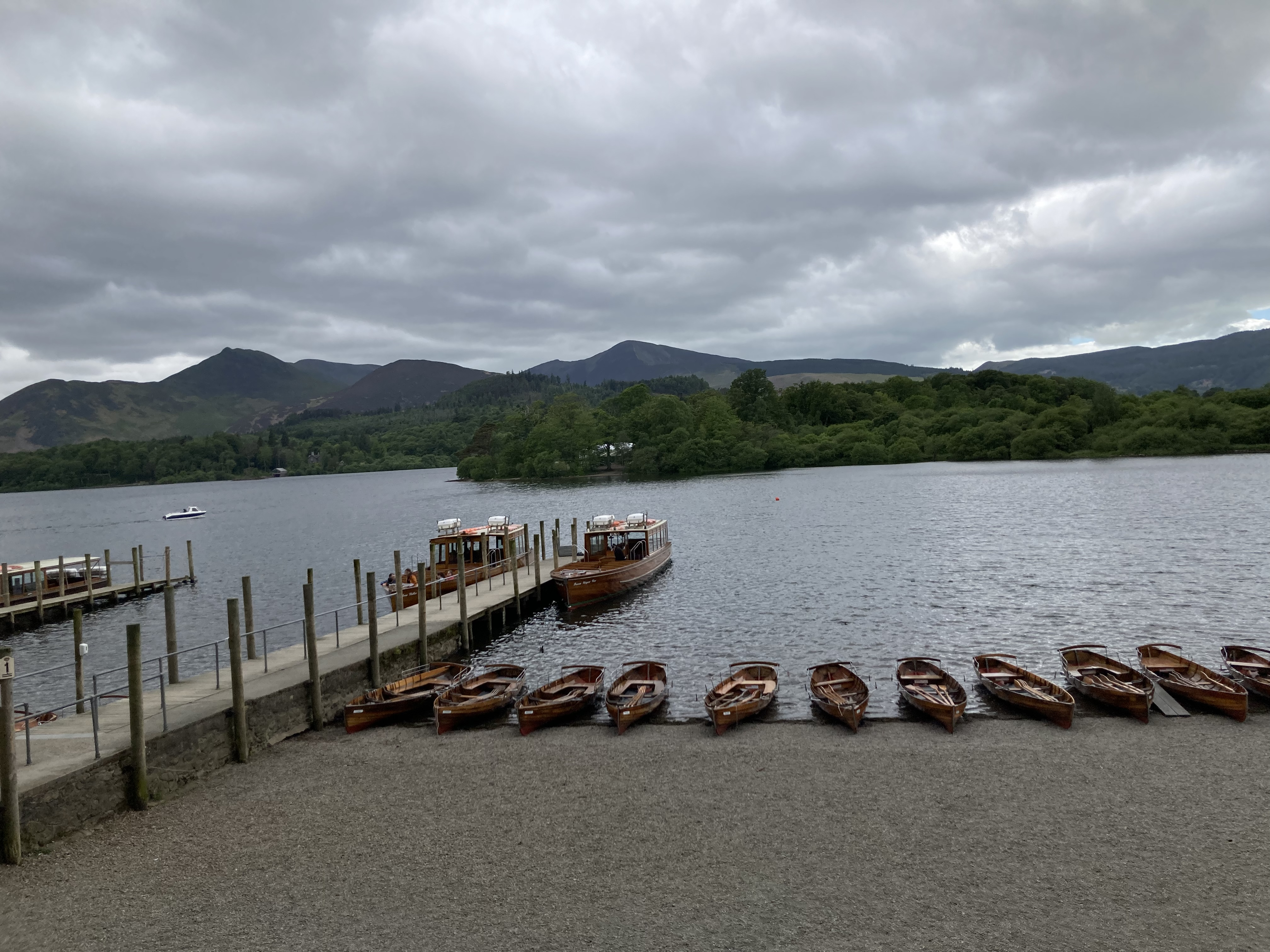
Some canoes and a dock at the edge of Derwent Water
