= Binsey, Cumbria =

Hill in the Lake District in Cumbria, England

Binsey
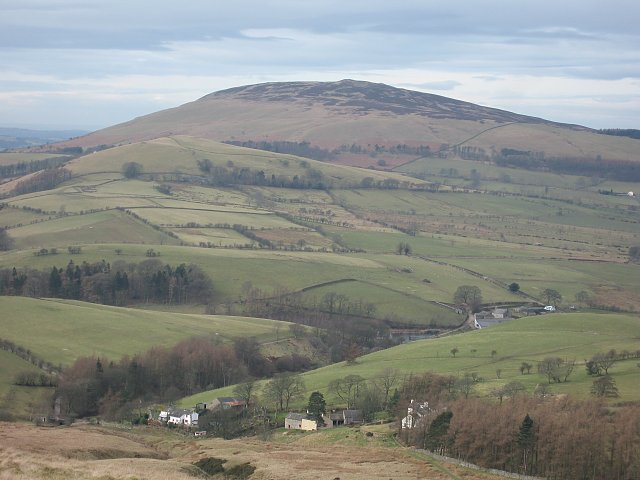
- Binsey from Longlands Fell to the east

Highest point
- Elevation: 447 m (1,467 ft)
- Prominence: 242 m (794 ft)
- Parent peak: Knott
- Listing: Marilyn, Wainwright
- Coordinates: 54°42′31″N 3°12′16″W

Geography
- Location within the Lake District Location within the former Allerdale Borough
- Location: Cumbria, England
- Parent range: Lake District, Northern Fells
- OS grid: NY225355
- Topo map: OS Landrangers 89, 90, Explorer OL4

Binsey is a hill on the northern edge of the Lake District in Cumbria, England. It is detached from the rest of the Lakeland hills, and thus provides a good spot to look out at the Northern and North Western Fells of the Lake District, as well as the coastal plain and, across the Solway Firth, Scotland. Snaefell on the Isle of Man is also visible on a clear day. It is the northernmost of the Wainwrights.

== Topography ==
Binsey stands on the otherwise low-level watershed separating the catchments of the Ellen to the north and the Derwent to the south. A slight ridge connects it to Great Cockup in the main massif of the Northern Fells, two miles to the south east. Binsey itself has a rounded form, but is subjectively more prominent than the similar Great Mell Fell and Little Mell Fell.

The 'pudding basin' shape holds all around Binsey except to the north west where a ridge descends over Whitas Park to a depression containing the remains of a Roman fort. Beyond is St John's Hill (950 ft (290 m)) (called Caermote Hill in Wainwright's Outlying Fells) which is topped by an earthwork called 'The Battery'. Finally the ridge descends to the village of Bothel in the Ellen Valley.

Binsey sends out a further spur to the east, culminating in the top of Latrigg (1,030 ft (310 m)) – not to be confused with Latrigg near Keswick. Beneath Latrigg is Over Water, a large tarn where the water level was raised by damming in 1920 to provide drinking water for Wigton. The outflow of Over Water feeds the Ellen, as does Humble Jumble Gill which drains Binsey's northern flank.

The hill is largely grass and heather, with only one significant outcrop of rock, West Crag. Flanking the eastern slopes of the fell is a thin belt of mixed woodland and a further plantation sits below West Crag.

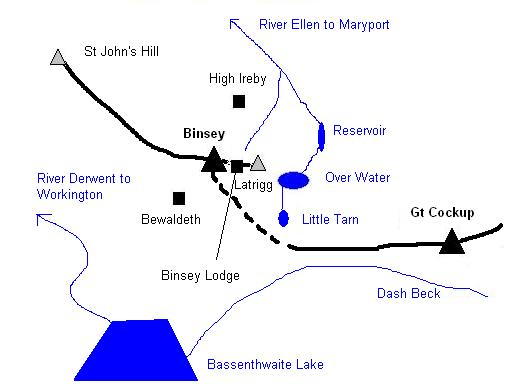
Sketch map of Binsey

== Summit ==
The summit is crowned by a tumulus whose stones have been raided to produce several small circular wind-shelters. There is also a modern cairn atop the tumulus and a trig point. Regarding the view, Wainwright stated: '...it is a most excellent station for appraising the Northern Fells as a preliminary to their exploration...it is a viewpoint of outstanding merit.' Far to the south the Coniston Fells can be seen, almost 25 mi (40 km) away, while to the north the Solway Firth and the hills of Scotland are visible.

== Geology ==
The hill is formed from volcanic rocks, namely various sub-units of the Eycott Volcanic Group, which consists of basaltic andesite, andesite and rhyolitic lavas. There are several small disused quarries to the east and north.

== Ascents ==
The hill can be climbed by several routes, perhaps most simply beginning in the south-east (Parking on the road between Binsey Lodge and Fell Side Farm), following a track to the summit. An alternative is along a lane from the A591 road, just north of Bewaldeth. From the top of the lane a loop to the left and behind a disused pit will enable the track across the summit to be picked up. Wainwright also lists a further route from High Ireby.

== Views from the summit ==
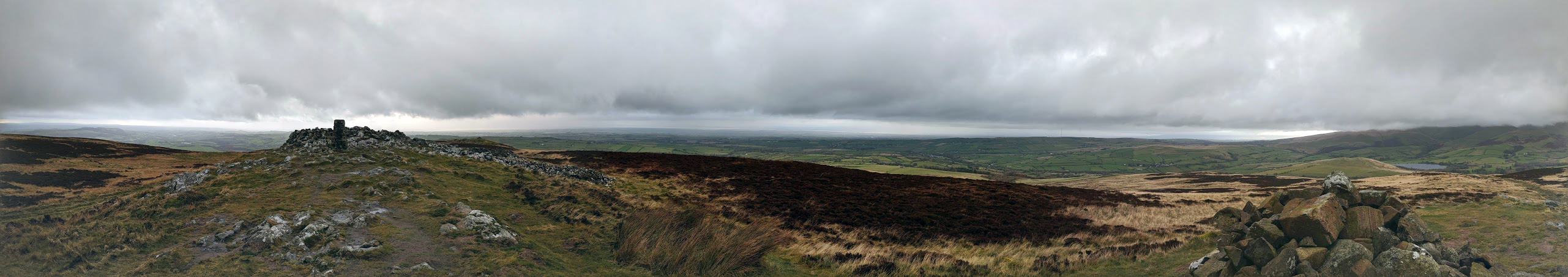
A panorama from the summit of Binsey, November 2019

The following Wainwrights are visible on a clear day:

No	Fell	Heading (°)	Distance (m)
1	Longlands Fell	90.7	3.2
2	High Pike (Caldbeck)	92.2	5.2
3	Brae Fell	92.5	4.0
4	Great Sca Fell	102.9	4.3
5	Meal Fell	106.1	3.8
6	Knott	108.8	4.7
7	Great Cockup	113.3	3.3
8	Great Calva	122.4	4.9
9	Blencathra	127.5	7.8
10	Bakestall	138.3	3.9
11	Skiddaw	150.3	4.6
12	Carl Side	157.1	5.0
13	Long Side	160.5	4.6
14	Ullock Pike	163.0	4.4
15	High Raise (Langdale)	166.9	16.5
16	Sergeant's Crag	167.6	15.3
17	Harrison Stickle	167.6	17.8
18	Thunacar Knott	167.8	17.5
19	Wetherlam	168.6	21.8
20	Pike of Stickle	169.1	17.8
21	Pike of Blisco	170.6	19.7
22	Rosthwaite Fell	170.8	14.5
23	Swirl How	171.3	22.0
24	Great Carrs	171.5	21.7
25	Old Man of Coniston	171.8	23.6
26	Brim Fell	172.0	23.2
27	Catbells	172.1	9.8
28	Glaramara	174.2	15.6
29	Maiden Moor	175.1	10.8
30	Bowfell	175.1	18.1
31	High Spy	176.3	12.0
32	Allen Crags	176.5	16.8
33	Esk Pike	176.7	17.4
34	Barrow	178.2	8.5
35	Great End	178.7	16.9
36	Dale Head	179.6	12.6
37	Scafell Pike	180.9	17.6
38	Causey Pike	181.4	9.1
39	Hindscarth	181.8	11.8
40	Great Gable	182.2	15.7
41	Scafell	182.6	18.1
42	Outerside	184.7	8.8
43	Scar Crags	185.3	9.3
44	Barf	185.7	5.5
45	Robinson	186.1	11.7
46	Sail	188.9	9.6
47	Grisedale Pike	190.6	8.2
48	Crag Hill	191.1	9.7
49	Lord's Seat	192.0	5.7
50	Whinlatter	193.9	6.8
51	Hopegill Head	195.4	8.7
52	Grasmoor	197.0	9.9
53	Broom Fell	198.2	5.6
54	Whiteside	199.3	8.9
55	Mellbreak	203.3	11.5
56	Sale Fell	206.5	4.1
57	Graystones	206.6	6.4
58	Great Borne	206.8	13.5
59	Hen Comb	207.1	12.3
60	Crag Fell	210.1	15.4
61	Gavel Fell	211.5	12.6
62	Ling Fell	211.8	5.2
63	Low Fell	213.2	9.7
64	Blake Fell	214.9	12.1
65	Burnbank Fell	217.3	11.5
66	Fellbarrow	218.4	9.1

The Lakeland prospect occupies only 130° of the whole, the lowest figure for any Lakeland fell. Remarkably, the southernmost Wainwright (Coniston Old Man) is visible from the northernmost (Binsey); at 23.6 miles, this is the longest line of sight between two Wainwrights. The furthest point visible on a clear day is the top of Slieve Donard, the highest mountain in Northern Ireland, in Mourne, 115 mi (185 km) away.
