= Brae Fell =

Mountain in the Lake District, England

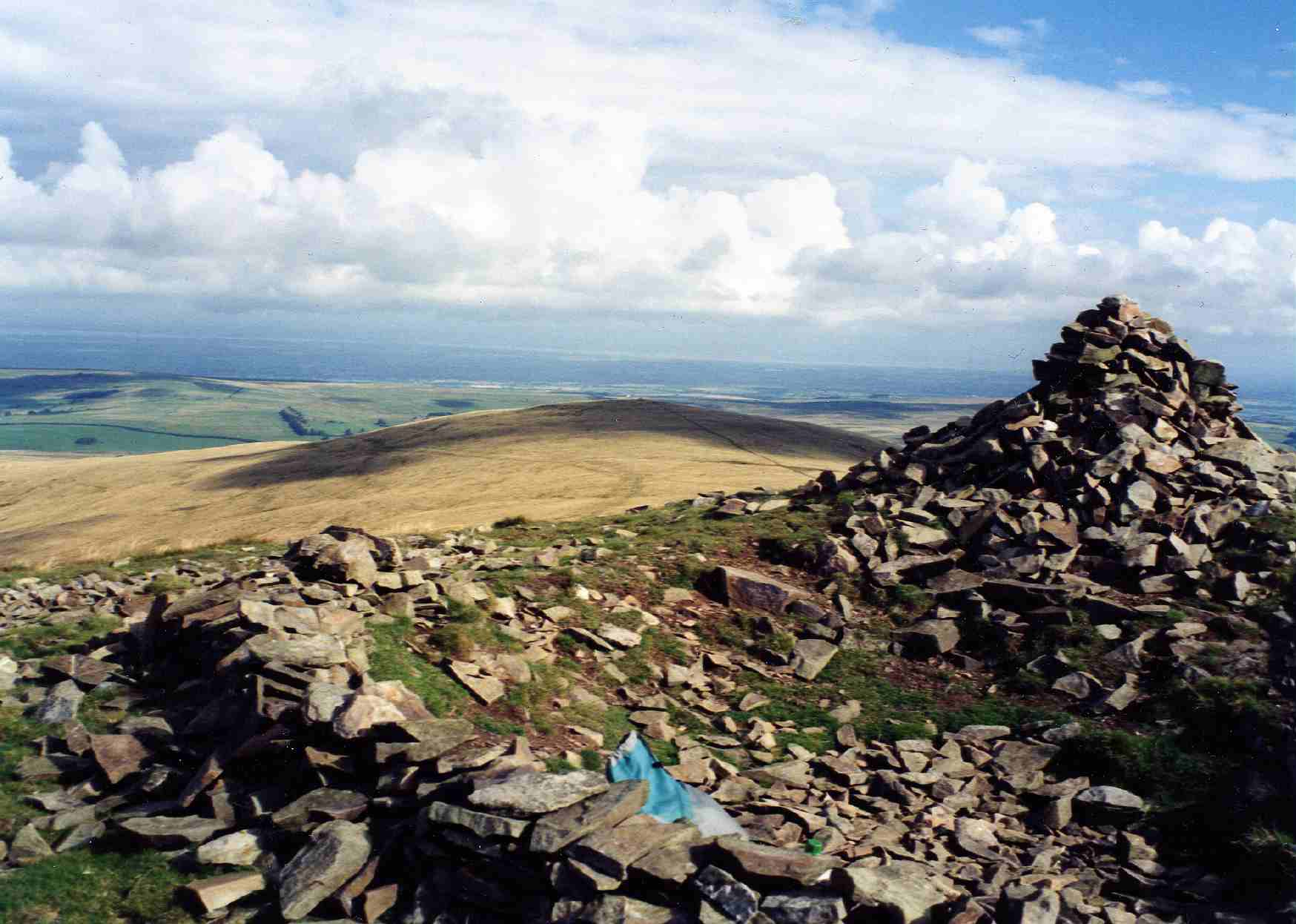
- Brae Fell seen from the cairn on Little Sca Fell.

Highest point
- Elevation: 586 m (1,923 ft)
- Prominence: 16 m (52 ft)
- Parent peak: Knott
- Listing: Wainwright
- Coordinates: 54°42′21″N 3°06′23″W

Geography
- Location within the Lake District
- Location: Cumbria, England
- Parent range: Lake District, Northern Fells
- OS grid: NY288351
- Topo map: OS Landranger 90, Explorer OL4

Brae Fell is a fell in the English Lake District, situated 12 kilometres (7 1/2 miles) north of Keswick it reaches a height of 586 m (1,923 ft) and is regarded as part of the Caldbeck Fells along with High Pike and Carrock Fell even though it has ridge links to the Uldale Fells. It forms part of the Skiddaw Group SSSI, a Site of Special Scientific Interest for its ecology and geology.

The fell's name has Scottish overtones and translates from the Scots language as a hillside or slope. Its northern flanks face the Scottish Borders country across the Eden Valley and Solway Firth.

== Topography ==
Brae Fell is large and grassy and is really an outlying part of Great Sca Fell being situated on that fell's northern ridge separated by a col with a height of approximately 570 metres (1,870 ft). With a height of less than 2000 feet and prominence of around 16 metres it fails to be a fell of real importance. Alfred Wainwright gives it a chapter in his Pictorial Guide to the Lakeland Fells, being less than complimentary, saying, “If all hills were like Brae Fell there would be far fewer fell walkers”. It is best viewed from the low ground to the north where it shows off its full height. Brae Fell was mined in the nineteenth century for Lead, the mine lies on its eastern slopes just above Roughton Gill and there are large spoil tips remaining to this day.

== Ascents ==
Brae Fell is often climbed in conjunction with other fells in the area. A direct ascent of the fell is usually undertaken from the minor road that skirts the northern slopes, there is no fence so the climb can start anywhere along its length. There is a vague path amongst the grass which leads to the summit.

== Summit ==
The top of the fell is strewn with a few boulders and there is a fair sized cairn which is a landmark for several kilometres around. The view from the summit is one of the finest in the Northern Fells, with the panorama north taking in the Solway Firth, Scottish Borders and the northern Pennines.

The following (very few) Wainwrights are visible on a clear day:

No	Fell	Heading (°)	Distance (m)
1	High Pike (Caldbeck)	91.7	1.9
2	Bowscale Fell	135.0	4.0
3	Knott	160.3	1.4
4	Great Sca Fell	167.4	0.8
5	Skiddaw Little Man	195.8	4.8
6	Meal Fell	201.4	0.9
7	Skiddaw	204.1	4.2
8	Bakestall	206.0	3.1
9	Ullock Pike	213.8	4.8
10	Grisedale Pike	214.7	9.6
11	Grasmoor	216.5	11.6
12	Hopegill Head	217.5	10.3
13	Great Cockup	219.4	1.5
14	Whiteside	220.1	10.8
15	Barf	220.5	7.0
16	Whinlatter	221.0	8.6
17	Lord's Seat	223.6	7.5
18	Gavel Fell	225.0	14.9
19	Broom Fell	228.1	7.7
20	Blake Fell	228.2	14.7
21	Burnbank Fell	230.6	14.2
22	Graystones	231.0	8.8
23	Fellbarrow	234.2	11.9
24	Ling Fell	237.8	7.9
25	Sale Fell	238.9	6.8
26	Binsey	272.5	4.0
27	Longlands Fell	279.4	0.8
