= Lowthwaite Fell =

Mountain in the Lake District, England

- Location within the Lake District Location within the former Allerdale Borough

Highest point
- Elevation: 509 m (1,670 ft)
- Prominence: c. 32 m
- Parent peak: Brae Fell
- Listing: Birkett
- Coordinates: 54°42′09″N 3°07′18″W

Geography
- Location: Cumbria, England
- Parent range: Lake District, Northern Fells
- OS grid: NY278347
- Topo map: OS Landranger 89, 90 OS Explorer 4

Lowthwaite Fell is a hill in the Northern Fells of the Lake District in England. It is a grassy eminence, rising to a height of 509 metres (1,670 ft), above sea level, on the ridge between Longlands Fell and Great Sca Fell.

The fell is not categorised as a Wainwright. Whilst it does not feature independently within Alfred Wainwright's guides to the mountains of The Lake District, it does however appear as part of the detail in the section specific to Longlands Fell. Furthermore it is categorised as a Birkett due to its explicit inclusion as one of the summits in Walk 4 of the "North O'Skiddaw Group" in Bill Birkett's Lakeland guidebook.

== See also ==
- List of hills in the Lake District
