= Over Water =

Lake in Cumbria, England

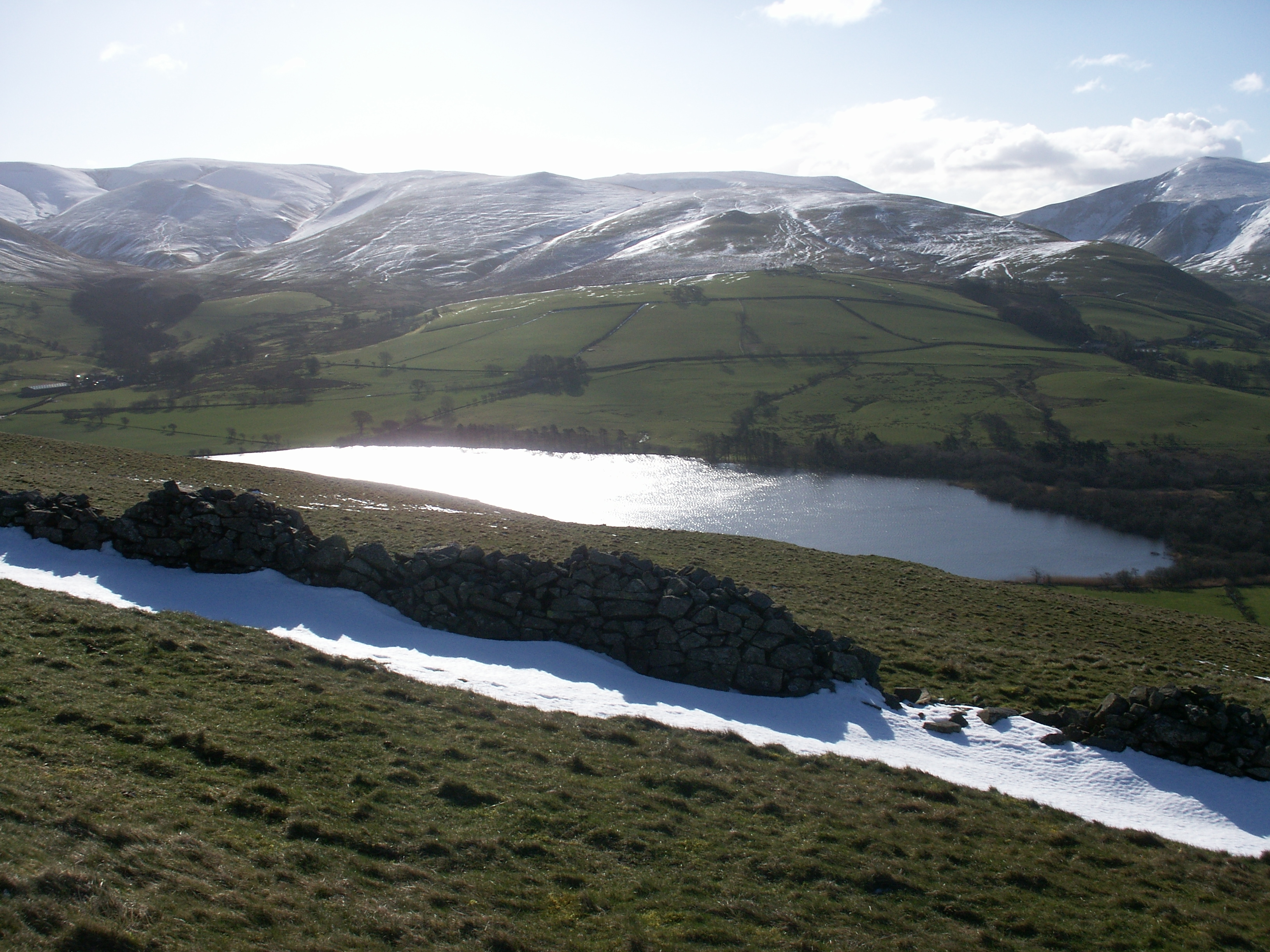
- Over Water as seen from Latrigg (Uldale)

- Location in the Lake District National Park Location in Allerdale, Cumbria
- Location: Lake District, Cumbria
- Coordinates: 54°42′17″N 3°09′45″W
- Basin countries: United Kingdom
- Average depth: 18 m (59 ft)
- Surface elevation: 188 m (617 ft)
- Islands: none

Over Water is a small lake or tarn in the north of the English Lake District, southwest of the hamlet of Longlands. Binsey, Great Cockup and Longlands Fell overlook the lake.

Over Water was a small natural waterbody which was dammed in 1904 to increase its size. It served as a reservoir supplying drinking water to the town of Wigton until October 2022. Over Water supports a range of flora including water lilies and water lobelia.

The name of the tarn has changed over time. It was recorded as 'Orre Water' in 1687, which derives from the Old Norse which means 'the lake where blackcock or grouse are found' or 'Orri's lake' ...ON 'orri' is a bird of the grouse family, but hence also a nickname and pers.[onal] n.[ame]."

While there are public footpaths in the area, there is no public access to the lake itself as it is Site of Special Scientific Interest (SSSI). The lake is owned by the National Trust, while the shore is privately owned by a number of different landowners.

It is notable for being a feeding place for the Ospreys which breed beside Bassenthwaite Lake. Ospreys are still extremely rare breeding birds in England. There is an official Osprey viewpoint at Dodd Wood in the locality.
