= Bowscale Fell =

Mountain in the Lake District, England

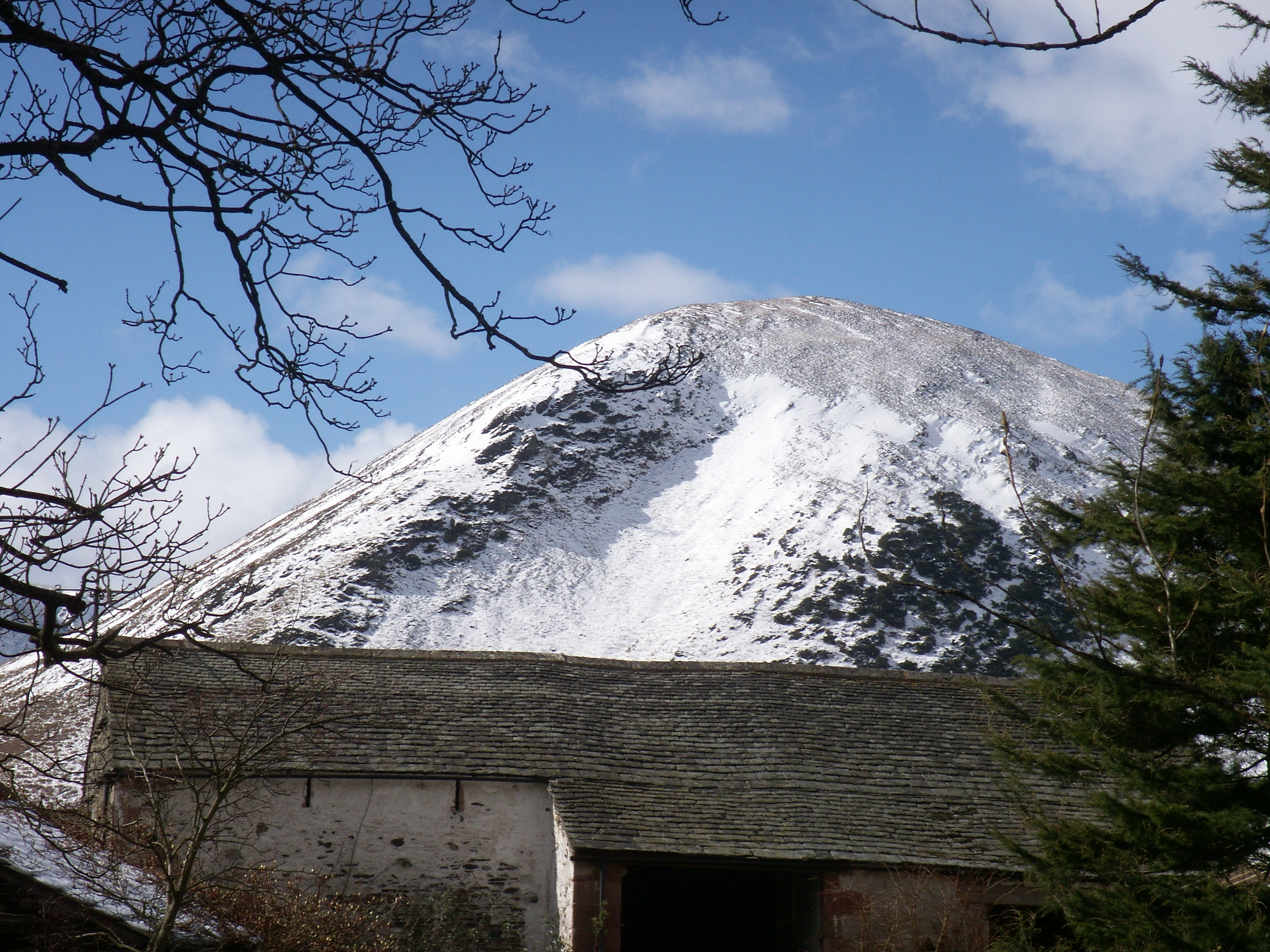
- The Tongue, Bowscale Fell from Mungrisdale

Highest point
- Elevation: 702 m (2,303 ft)
- Prominence: c. 90 m
- Parent peak: Blencathra
- Listing: Wainwright, Hewitt, Nuttal
- Coordinates: 54°39′55″N 3°02′03″W

Geography
- Location within the Lake District
- Location: Cumbria, England
- Parent range: Lake District, Northern Fells
- OS grid: NY334305
- Topo map: OS Landranger 89, 90 OS Explorer OL5

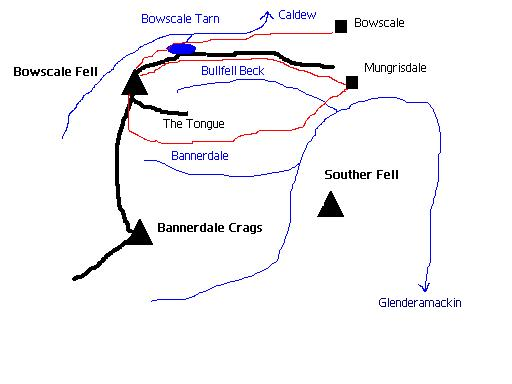
sketch map of Bowscale Fell

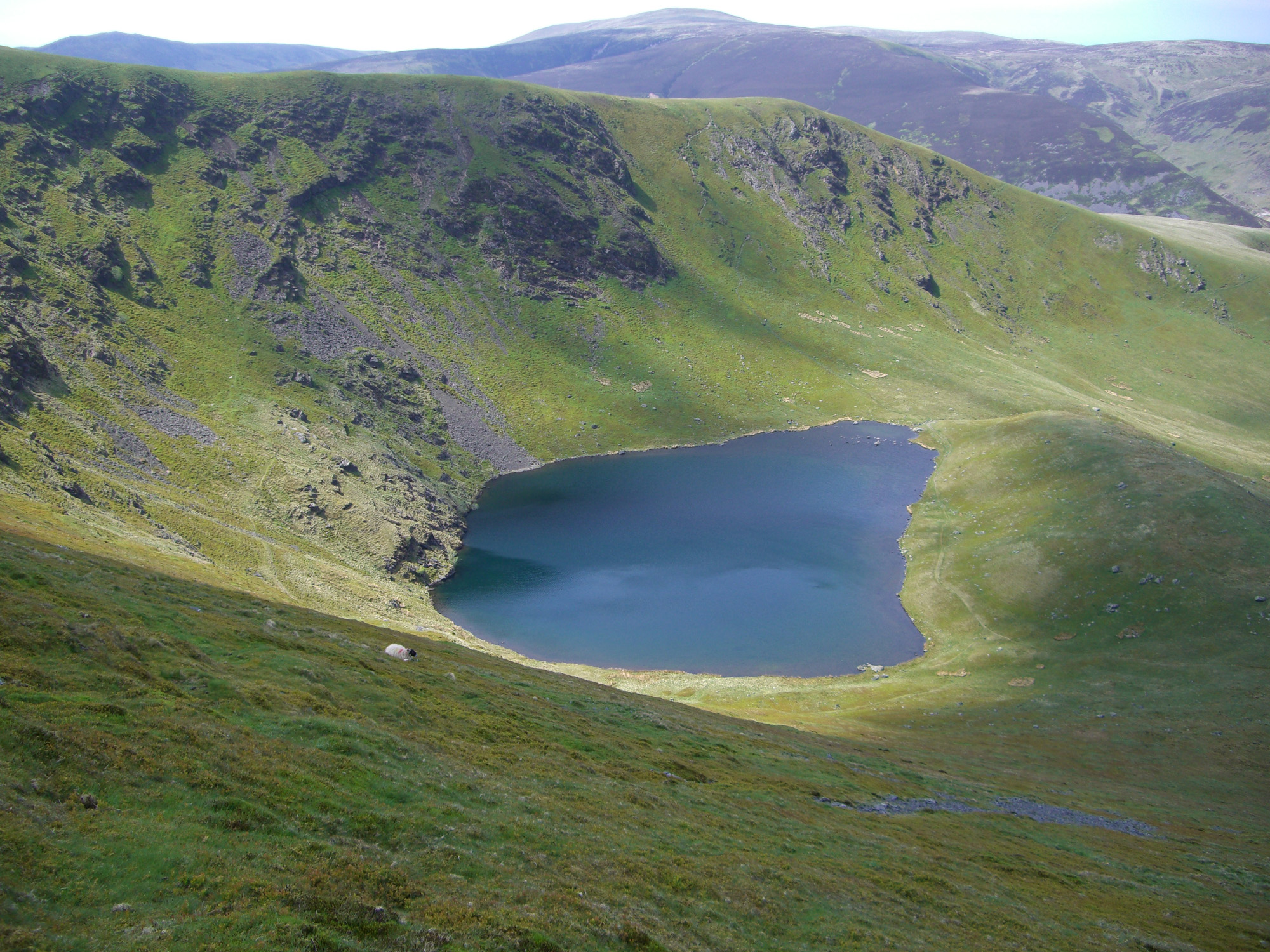
Bowscale Tarn seen from Tarn Crags.

Bowscale Fell is a hill in the English Lake District. It rises above the village of Mungrisdale in the Northern Fells. Bowscale Fell stands at the extreme north east the Blencathra group, connected to this higher fell by the intervening Bannerdale Crags. In common with many fells the western slopes are smooth and convex while the eastern side exhibits crags.

== Topography ==
A curving ridge surrounds the head of Bannerdale, with Bowscale Fell at the northern end and Bannerdale Crags to the south. The ridgeline is broad and grassy with occasional patches of bog and a couple of small tarns in the north. Bannerdale flows due east from the depression between the two fells to its junction with the River Glenderamackin. A second tributary of the Glenderamackin, Bullfell Beck, runs parallel a little to the north, its source being directly beneath the summit of Bowscale Fell. The heads of the two valleys are divided by a truncated east ridge, The Tongue, which sports a top at 1,814 feet (553 m) at the far end. From below, The Tongue appears as an impressive pyramidal peak with steep slopes on all sides, obscuring the higher ground behind.

A second, longer eastern ridge runs out to the north of Bowscale Fell, forming the northern wall of Bullfell Beck. This has two subsidiary tops at 2,017 feet (615 m) and 1,981 feet (604 m). It ends steeply at Raven Crag above the Mungrisdale to Heskett Newmarket road. Perched in a bowl scooped out on the northern face of this ridge is Bowscale Tarn. This is a classic corrie tarn, held in by a whalebacked moraine and having a depth of around 60 feet (18 m). Bowscale Tarn was a popular tourist attraction in Victorian times, visitors being brought by pony to observe its wild and moody setting. Tastes change and the tarn now finds itself on few itineraries for a grand tour of the District. Legend had it that the tarn was home to two immortal fish, one version of the tale also crediting them with the gift of speech. Above the water is Tarn Crag, the steepest face on the fell.

The western and northern flanks of the fell drain to the River Caldew, which heads north east to Carlisle for a meeting with the River Eden, and thence to the Solway Firth. Northward across the deep cutting of the Caldew is Carrock Fell, while to the west are Great Calva and Knott. Wainwright remarked that the western slopes of Bowscale Fell are drained by the Caldew which ultimately flows to the east, while the eastern slopes feed the Glenderamackin which soon turns west for Keswick and the River Derwent.

Being on the Derwent - Eden watershed, Bowscale Fell has further topographical significance by providing the link between the Northern and Eastern Fells. The eastern ridge continues almost imperceptibly beneath Raven Crag, crossing the road before rising again to form Little Eycott and Eycott Hills. From here the watershed runs south across Great Mell Fell and ultimately climbs onto Great Dodd in the Helvellyn range.

== Summit ==
The summit of the fell bears a rash of stones although all else is grass. There is a windshelter at the highest point and a cairn a little to the north, marking the direction of Bowscale Tarn. The view of Blencathra and Sharp Edge is excellent, together with a surprising vista of the North Western Fells through the Glenderaterra gap.

== Ascents ==
A number of alternatives are available when starting from Mungrisdale. The easiest follows a gently rising track to the depression at the head of Bannerdale, while a variation is to turn off and climb steeply up the terminal slope of The Tongue. Bullfell Beck can also be followed to give the most direct ascent to the summit, but the best route is perhaps to follow the east ridge over its undulating tops. From Bowscale, a little along the road to the north, the Victorian pony route to Bowscale Tarn can still be followed, continuing up a grassy rake that bisects Tarn Crag.

If a much longer walk is required, the ridge between Bowscale Fell and Bannerdale Crags can be reached from the Caldew Valley to the west. This makes Mosedale, or even Skiddaw House and points west into possible starting points.

== Ecology ==
Bowscale Fell is included in the Skiddaw Group Site of Special Scientific Interest. Unusual features include Young Wood which has been claimed to be the highest wood in England.
