= Dash Valley =

Valley in the Lake District, England

Coordinates: 54.67943°N 3.14609°W

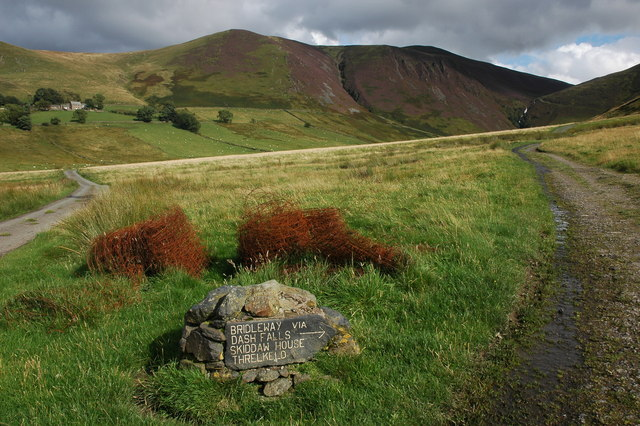
Dash valley

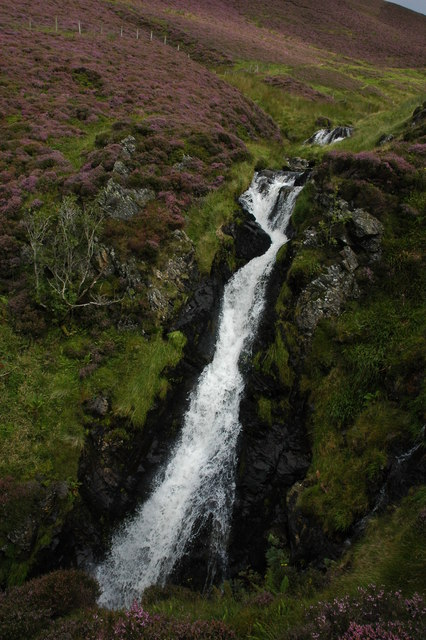
Dash Falls

The Dash Valley is a small valley in the English Lake District. It has only one dwelling, Dash Farm, the fields of which spread right across the valley. The valley is flanked on the northern side by Great Cockup, and on the southern side by Bakestall, part of the Skiddaw massif. At the head of the valley Dash Beck, the river which flows through the valley, falls dramatically forming Dash Falls (aka Whitewater Dash), which Wainwright called the finest succession of falls in the Lake District.

A private road leads up the valley to Dash Farm, and a track branches off this and goes all the way up the valley, past Dash Falls to Skiddaw House, a former shepherd's hut now used as a youth hostel.

The upper part of the valley is in the Skiddaw Group SSSI.
