= Little Cockup =

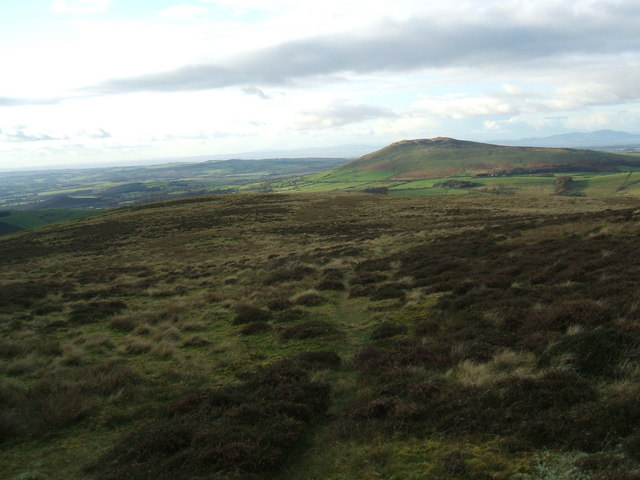
- Little Cockup

Highest point
- Elevation: 395 m (1,296 ft)
- Prominence: c. 3 m
- Listing: Birkett

Geography
- Location: Cumbria, England
- Parent range: Lake District, Northern Fells

Little Cockup is a fell in the Northern Fells area of the Lake District, Cumbria, England. It is located in the Uldale Fells, about 5 kilometres (3 mi) north of Skiddaw, near the larger fell of Great Cockup 1 kilometre (0.62 mi) to the east, and has an elevation of 395 metres (1,296 ft). Another hill called plain Cockup is about 2 kilometres (1.2 mi) to the south.

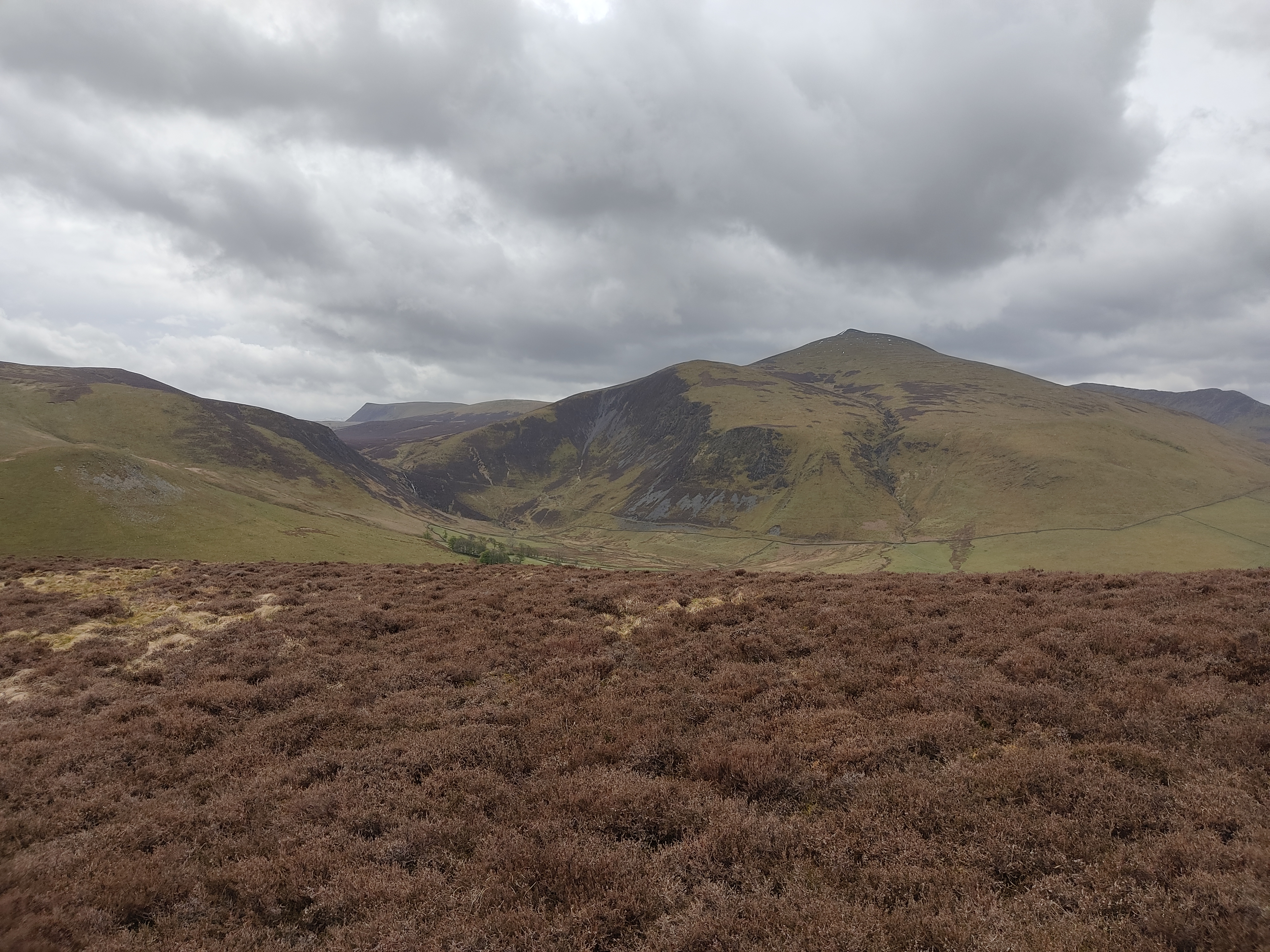
View from Little Cockup towards Blencathra and Skiddaw

== Information ==
Little Cockup is located near the Great Cockup fell and was given its name of Little Cockup to distinguish it from Great Cockup. The name "Cockup" derives from the words in the Old English language for a secluded valley and Black Grouse. Little Cockup has an elevation of 395 metres (1,296 ft).

Little Cockup is smaller and lower than Great Cockup, which is 526 metres (1,726 ft). Little Cockup is often used by fellwalkers and hikers as part of one of several routes to ascend Great Cockup. There is no path up Little Cockup, and walkers have to go through patches of bracken on the way up. There is a circular stone ledge near the top of the fell and on the summit is a cairn with common heather growing around it. Great Cockup and Bassenthwaite Lake can be seen from its summit.

== In popular culture ==
Little Cockup has been referred to in an edition of Punch magazine and was also mentioned in Alfred Wainwright's walking guidebooks about the Lake District alongside Great Cockup. In 2011, Business Weekly published a news story suggesting that the Government of the United Kingdom's Department for Business, Innovation and Skills' Technology Strategy Board was considering investing in nearby towns and the area around Little Cockup.

Because the name of Little Cockup is a double entendre, it is often included on lists of rude-sounding place names.
