= High Pike =

Mountain in England

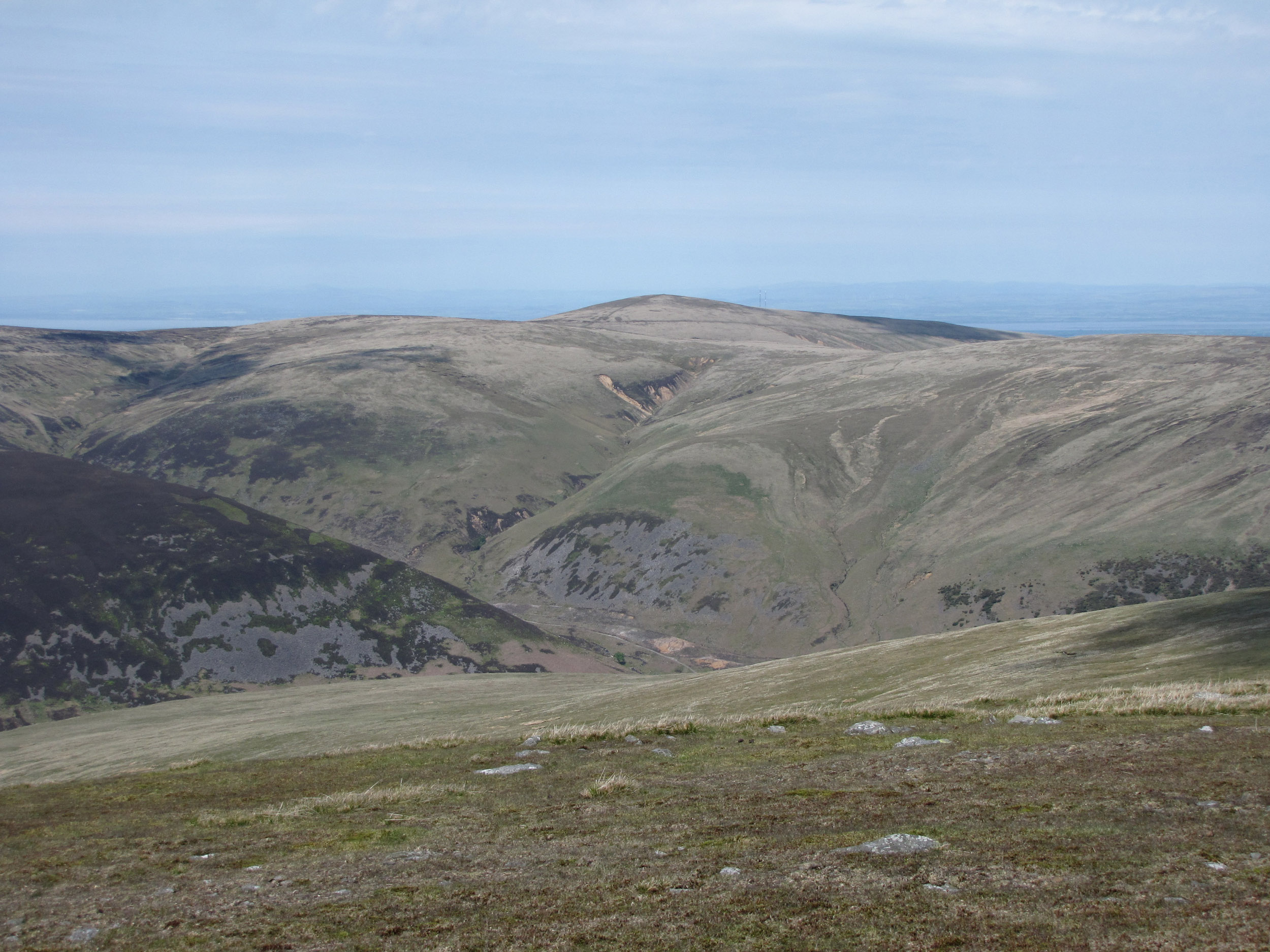
- High Pike seen across the Caldew valley from Bowscale Fell, 5 km to the SE.

Highest point
- Elevation: 658 m (2,159 ft)
- Prominence: 69 m (226 ft)
- Parent peak: Knott
- Listing: Hewitt, Nuttall, Wainwright
- Coordinates: 54°42′18″N 3°03′36″W

Geography
- Location within the Lake District
- Location: Cumbria, England
- Parent range: Lake District, Northern Fells
- OS grid: NY318350
- Topo map: OS Landranger 90 OS Explorer 5

Listed summits of High Pike
Name	Grid ref	Height	Status
Great Lingy Hill	NY309339	616 m (2,021 ft)	Nuttall
Hare Stones	NY315344	627 m (2,057 ft)	Nuttall

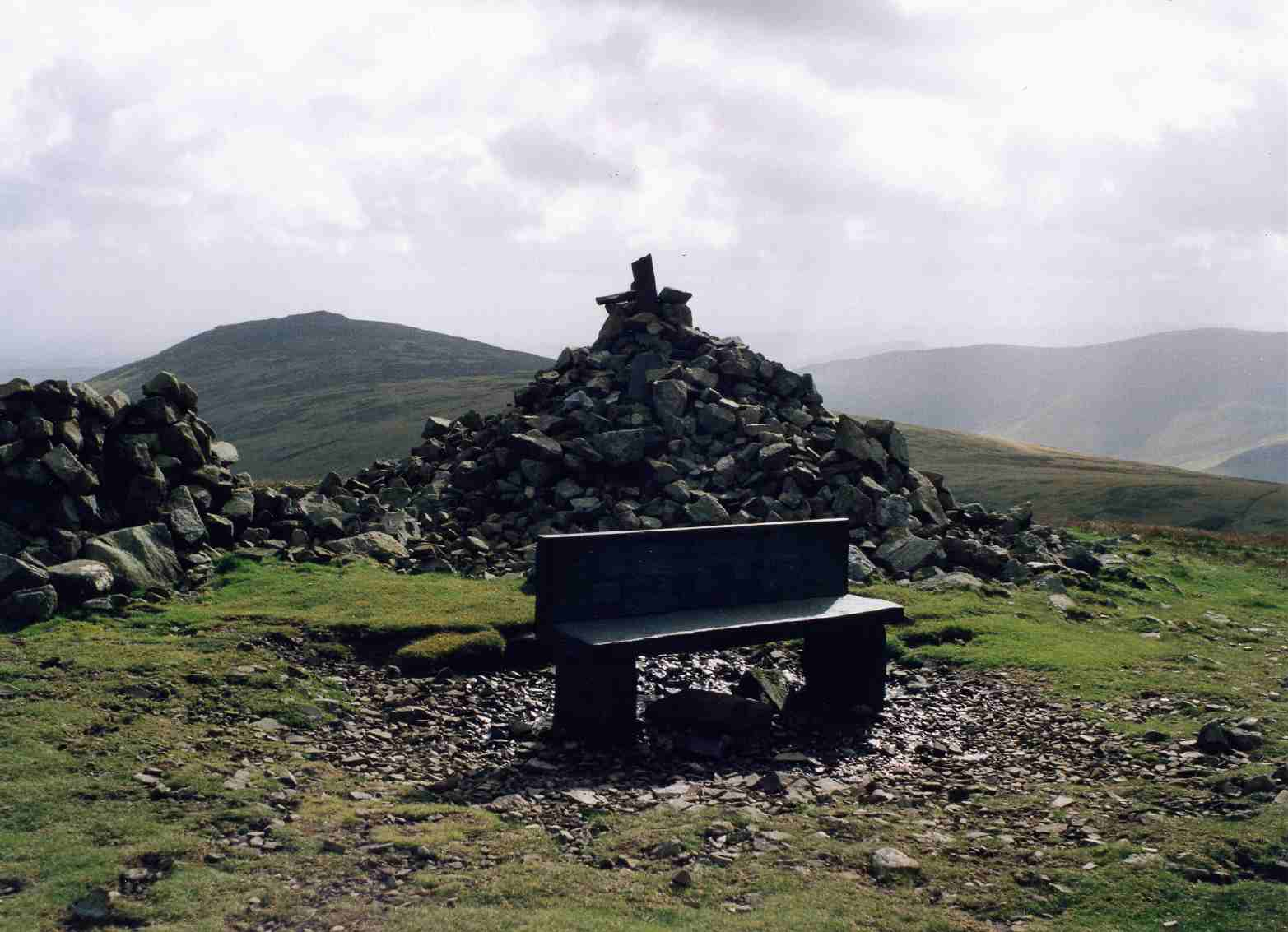
High Pike summit with Carrock Fell in the background.

High Pike is a fell in the northern part of the English Lake District, it is located 4.5 kilometres (2 3/4 miles) south of Caldbeck. It has a height of 658 metres (2,159 ft) and is the most northerly of the Lakeland fells over 2,000 feet (609.6 metres), a widely used criterion for determining which summits are classified as mountains. It is a large fell with its northern slopes falling away towards the lower ground between Caldbeck and Carlisle. Like the neighbouring Carrock Fell it has been extensively mined and the wealth created by the abundant variety of minerals on High Pike led to the saying "Caldbeck fells are worth all England else". This fell should not be confused with another Lake District High Pike situated in Scandale near Ambleside.

== Summit ==
High Pike’s summit is of some interest, it is used as a beacon by the population of Caldbeck and a fire is lit to celebrate important events such as the Millennium and coronations. The summit also has a massive cairn which was originally a shepherds cottage and has become a ruin. There is a trig point which has been mounted with a plaque which says “To Celebrate Caldbeck Parish’s Millennium Celebrations”, there is also a substantial wind shelter nearby which has also been built from the stones from the ruined cottage. However, the most unusual of High Pike’s summit fixtures is a slate bench which bears the inscription “In memory of Mick Lewis who loved all these fells”, he died in 1944 aged 16 and a small add-on is in memory of his mother who died in 1970. Famous mountaineer Chris Bonington lives in nearby Caldbeck and is he is often to be seen walking his dog on High Pike, he told a local newspaper in May 2005

"This (High Pike) is a hill I feel truly at home on, It has always been one I can return to after climbing some serious peak in the Himalaya or Alps and return to earth. It has the most wonderful changing moods. The light is ever-shifting across the fell making a kaleidoscope of colours, and its wildlife is fascinating."

== Mining ==
The mines of High Pike, which all lie on its northern slopes, have yielded numerous minerals since the 16th century. In fact, the most famous, Roughtongill is reputed to have yielded twenty three different ores. Copper was extracted at the Sandbeds mine, while lead and copper was mined at Driggeth mine. Later, some of the mines were reopened during the Second World War for the extraction of barytes, which was needed for the production of munitions. The last mine closed in 1966.

== Ascents ==
A direct ascent of High Pike is usually done from the north, starting around the Caldbeck area, however the fell is often climbed in conjunction with the nearby fells of Carrock Fell, Knott and Great Calva making a circular walk that starts and finishes near Mosedale to the south of Carrock Fell.

== Summit ==
High Pike’s position on the northern perimeter of the Lake District gives a fine view of the Solway Firth and the Scottish Border hills to the north. However the view south is severely curtailed by the bulks of Skiddaw and Blencathra and the main body of Lakeland is not seen well. High Pike has two subsidiary tops which are also classed as Nuttall fells, Hare Stones 627 metres (2,057 ft) and Great Lingy Hill 616 metres (2,021 ft) lie to the south west of the main summit at a distance of 600 metres and one kilometre respectively.

== Geodesy ==
High Pike was the origin (meridian) of the 6 inch and 1:2500 Ordnance Survey maps for Cumberland.

== Other sources ==
- A Pictorial Guide to the Lakeland Fells, The Northern Fells, Alfred Wainwright ISBN 0-7112-2458-7
- Complete Lakeland Fells, Bill Birkett, ISBN 0-00-713629-3
- The Mountains of England and Wales, John and Anne Nuttall ISBN 1-85284-037-4
- Mining Information
- Chris Bonnington - ‘High Pike is the hill I feel really at home on’
