= Bannerdale Crags =

Mountain in the Lake District, England

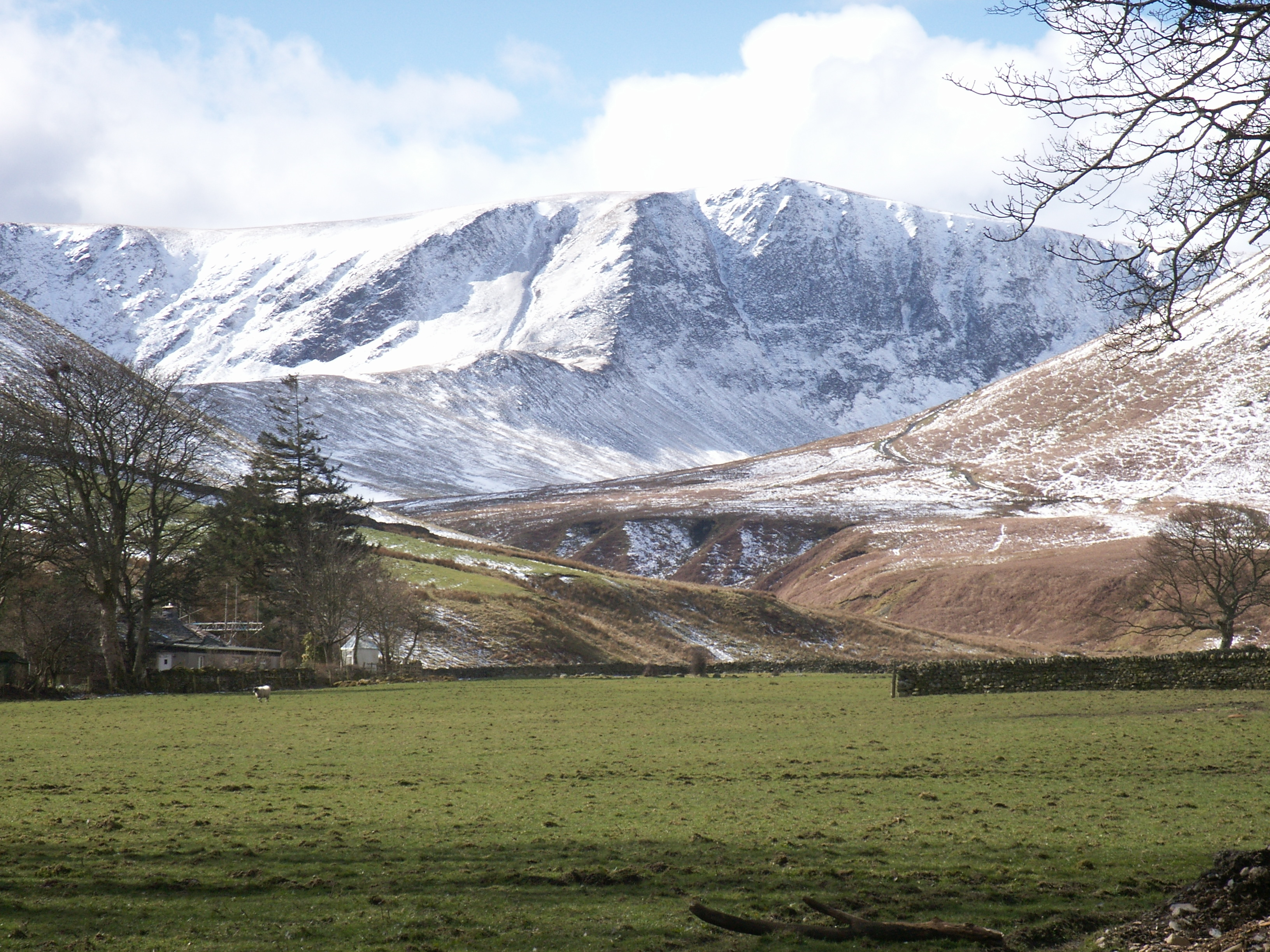
- Bannerdale Crags from Mungrisdale

Highest point
- Elevation: 683 m (2,241 ft)
- Prominence: c. 37 m (120 ft)
- Parent peak: Bowscale Fell
- Listing: Wainwright, Hewitt, Nuttal
- Coordinates: 54°39′06″N 3°01′56″W

Geography
- Location within the Lake District
- Location: Cumbria, England
- Parent range: Lake District, Northern Fells
- OS grid: NY335290
- Topo map: OS Landranger 89, 90 OS Explorer OL5

Bannerdale Crags is a fell in the English Lake District. It stands between Blencathra and Bowscale Fell in the Northern Fells.

== Topography ==
Bannerdale Crags is a ridge running north west to south east. The name was originally applied purely to the steep north eastern flank, but is now generally given to the fell as a whole.

A broad convex slope descends northward from Blencathra's Atkinson Pike top, gradually resolving into two ridges. The western arm continues to Mungrisdale Common while the north eastern limb, flecked with outcropping rock, falls to a steep sided col at 2,020 ft (620 m). From the depression Blackhazel Beck descends north west to join the River Caldew while the source of the Glenderamackin lies on the opposite slope. Across the col smooth slopes rise once more up the south western flank of the Bannerdale Crags ridge. There is little clue here to the wall of crags on the other side.

The north eastern side of the ridge looks down upon the valley of Bannerdale Beck, a tributary of the Glenderamackin. The crags on this side are almost continuous for a mile in length, the highest sections falling 600 ft (180 m) to the valley. The major breach is a spur protruding from the face almost below the summit, providing a fine route of ascent.(see below)

To the north the summit ridge continues across a broad grassy saddle to Bowscale Fell, the crags continuing a little way into the territory of the neighbouring fell. By contrast to the south east the fell ends in White Horse Bent, the abrupt ridge-end descent to the Glenderamackin. This river has one of the most convoluted passages in the district, passing around the south and east of Bannerdale Crags, before turning back on itself to surround Souther Fell on almost all sides and finally head west for Keswick and the River Derwent.

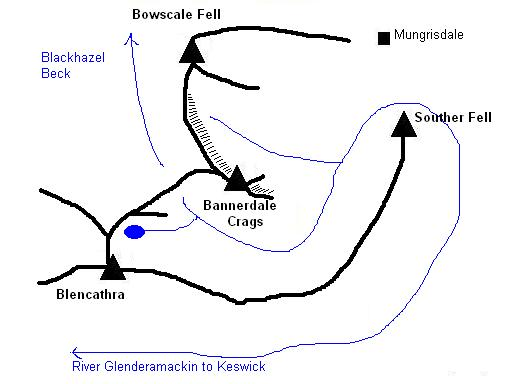
sketch map of Bannerdale Crags

== Summit ==
The summit of the fell is smooth and grassy, the highest point being set back from the crags and marked by a small cairn of flat stones. Nearer the face is another cairn, referred to on older large scale maps as a currick – a stone shelter built by shepherds. The view is surprisingly extensive, the Coniston Fells being in sight to the south, 20 miles (30 km) away. The Eastern and Far Eastern Fells are also in view, but the highlight is probably Sharp Edge and the eastern prospect of Blencathra.

== Geology ==
In common with much of the Northern Fells the Kirk Stile Formation of the Skiddaw Group predominates. This is composed of laminated mudstone and siltstone with greywacke sandstone and is of Ordovician age.

Bannerdale lead mine was operated at the base of the crag itself, primarily in the latter half of the nineteenth century. This raised galena and blende from an east- west vein system with two major levels being over 100 ft long. Further workings below the summit were known as the graphite level. It is not known how much was found, but the level has only been driven a few feet.

Saddleback Old Mine lies to the south of the fell, near to the col connecting it with Blencathra. This was also driven for lead, but the vein proved to consist mainly of limonite. An attempt was made to market this as a pigment, but commercial success was elusive and there are no records of operation after 1894.

== Ascents ==
Starting from Mungrisdale village to the east the Glenderamackin can be followed as far as its confluence with Bannerdale Beck. From here the east spur climbs almost direct to the summit, the rock scenery improving throughout and ending with a gentle scramble. An alternative from Mungrisdale is the wide and easy track leading up to the ridge between Bannerdale Crags and Bowscale Fell.

Less direct is the climb from Scales, first crossing Mousthwaite Combe to reach the Glenderamackin to the south of the fell. From here a straightforward assault on White Horse Bent is one alternative, or the miners track can be followed to Saddleback Old Mine and the source of the river.
