= Meal Fell =

Mountain in the Lake District, England

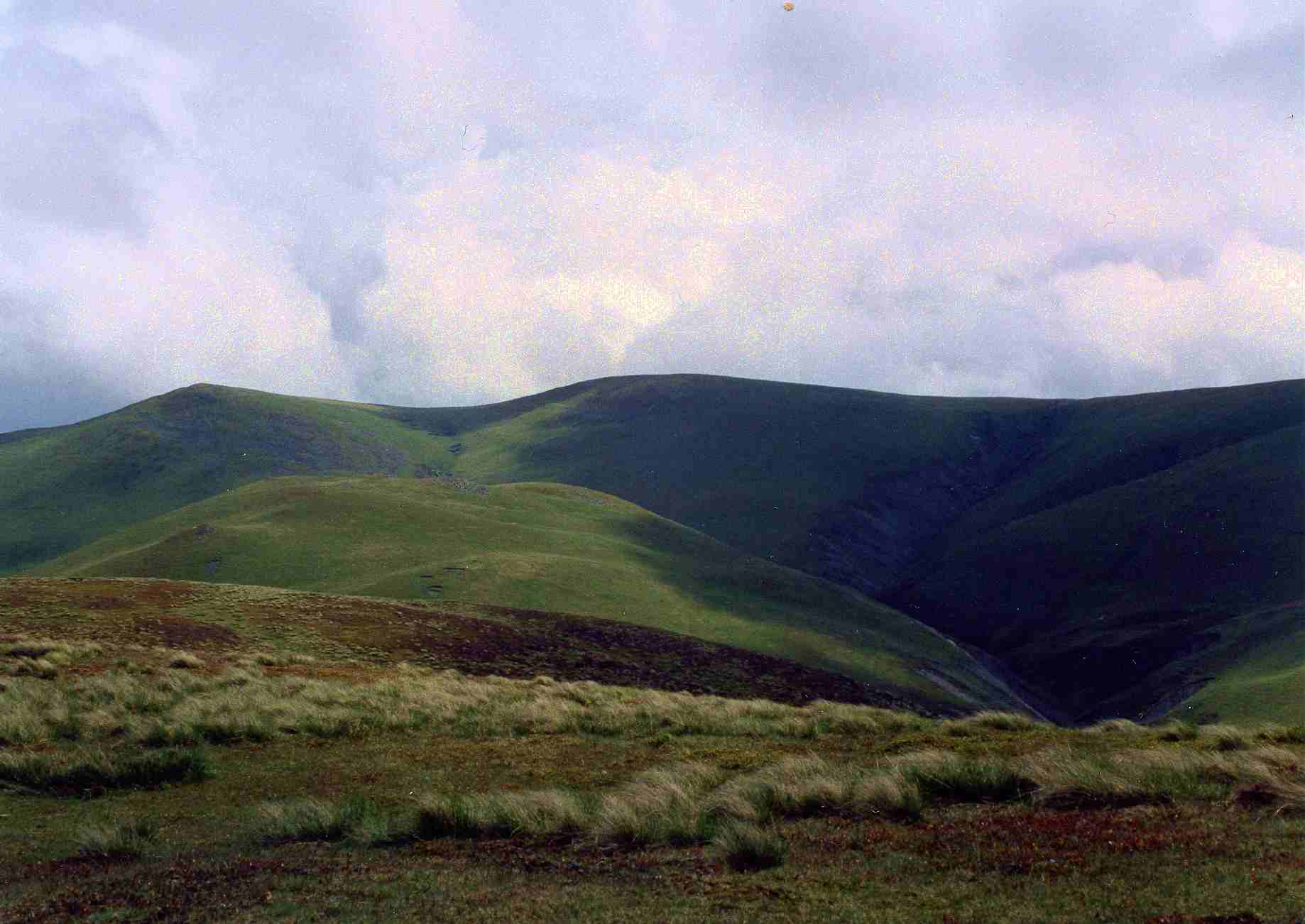
- Meal Fell seen from Great Cockup with Great Sca Fell behind.

Highest point
- Elevation: 550 m (1,804 ft)
- Prominence: c. 30 m (100 ft)
- Parent peak: Knott
- Listing: Wainwright
- Coordinates: 54°41′36″N 3°06′56″W

Geography
- Location within the Lake District Location within the former Allerdale Borough
- Location: Cumbria, England
- Parent range: Lake District, Northern Fells
- OS grid: NY282337
- Topo map: OS Landranger 89, 90 OS Explorer 4

Meal Fell is a small fell in the northern region of the English Lake District, it is situated seven kilometres (4 1/4 miles) south-west of the village of Caldbeck and is one of the four main Uldale Fells (the others being Longlands Fell, Great Cockup and Great Sca Fell).

== Topography ==
Meal fell reaches a height of 550 m (1,804 ft) and although it is largely grassy and smooth like the other Uldale Fells it does have a stony summit with patches of scree. Bill Birkett in his book The Complete Lakeland Fells speculates that the summit could possibly have been a small hill fort in ancient times, saying:

‘Around its summit rock outcrop it appears that the ground has been quarried away … the quarrying seems to extend in a full circle around the summit knoll. Could this be the remains of another hill fort along the lines of Carrock Fell?’

Meal Fell is linked to Great Cockup to the west by the pass of Trusmadoor, a place described by Alfred Wainwright as the ‘Piccadilly of sheep in that locality’ to the east Meal Fell is connected by a ridge to Great Sca Fell.

== Ascents ==
The fell is usually climbed directly from the minor road to the west of the Uldale Fells with the hamlets of Orthwaite and Longlands the favoured starting points. Both of these walks approach the fell through the valleys although most walkers will climb Great Cockup first before arriving at Meal Fell and then go on to other fells in the area.

== Summit ==
The view from the top of the fell is restricted inland by higher fells and the best prospect is north west towards the sea.
