= Bakestall =

Mountain in the Lake District, England

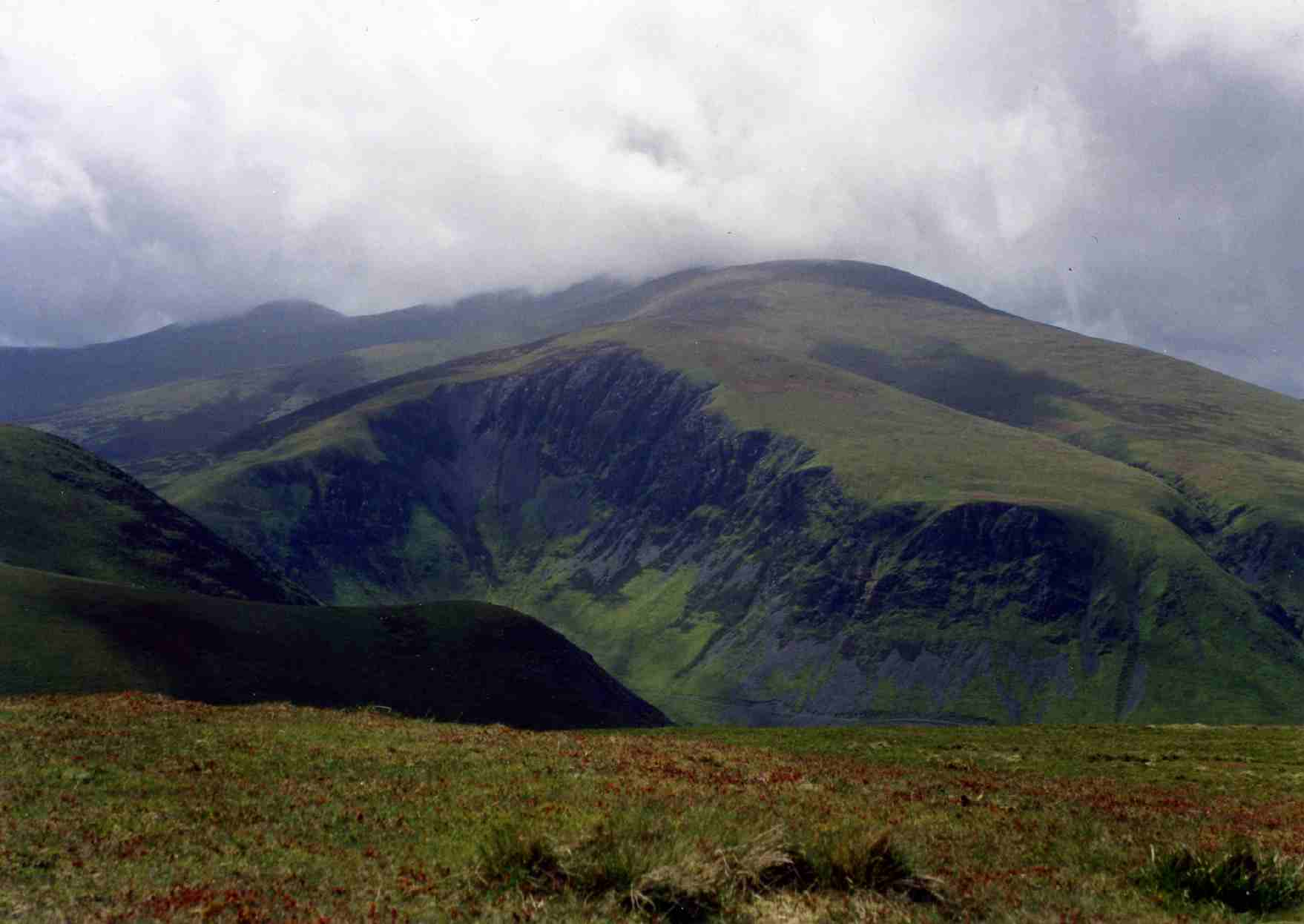
- Bakestall and Dead Crags with Skiddaw behind; seen from Great Cockup 3 km to the north.

Highest point
- Elevation: 673 m (2,208 ft)
- Prominence: c. 8 m (25 ft)
- Parent peak: Skiddaw
- Listing: Wainwright
- Coordinates: 54°39′58″N 3°08′22″W

Geography
- Location within the Lake District
- Location: Cumbria, England
- Parent range: Lake District, Northern Fells
- OS grid: NY266307
- Topo map: OS Landranger 89, 90 OS Explorer 4

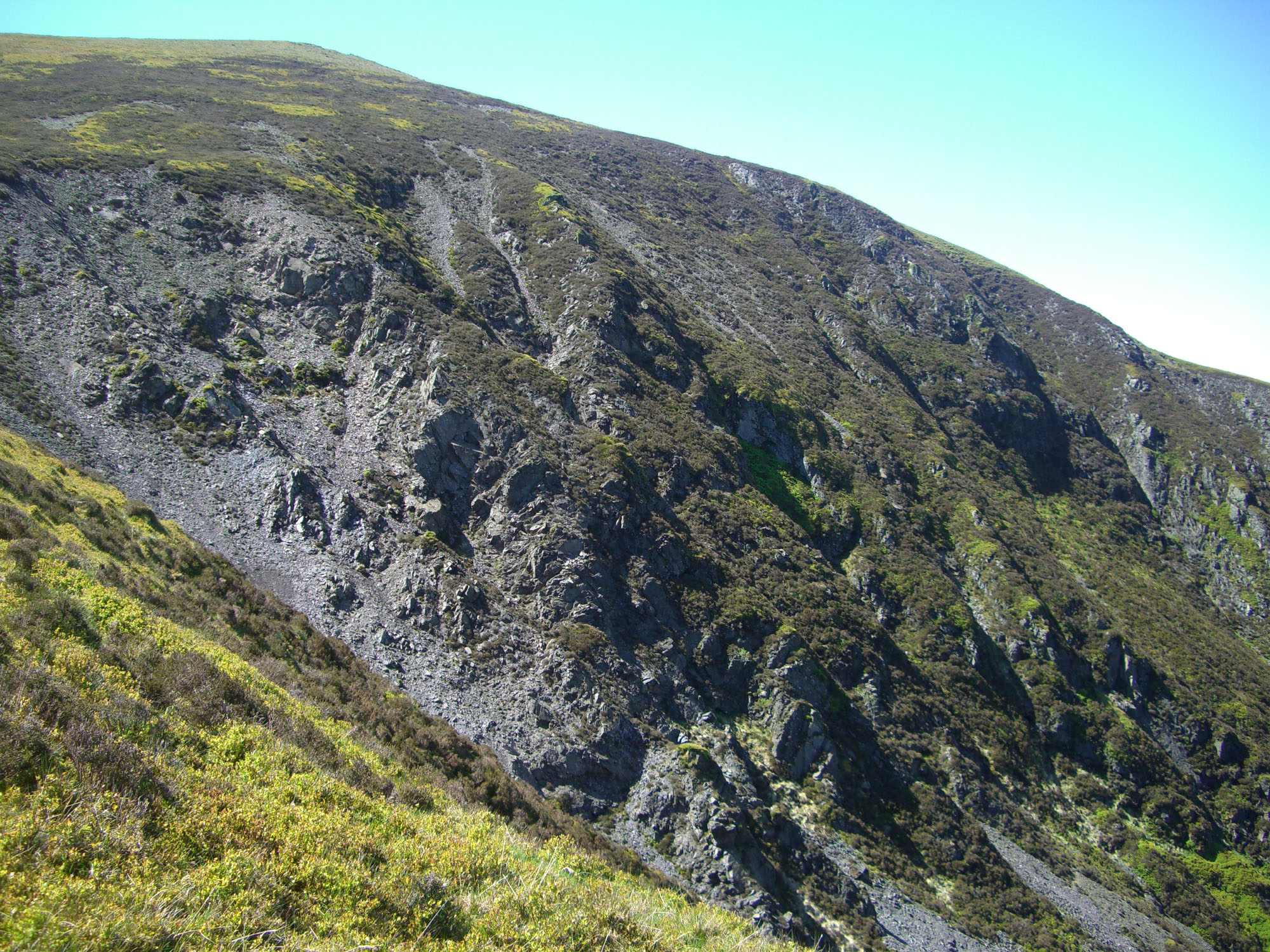
Close up of Dead Crags from Birkett Edge.

Bakestall is a fell in the English Lake District, it is situated seven kilometres (4 1/4 miles) north of Keswick in the quieter, even secluded northern sector of the national park known as ‘Back o’ Skiddaw’.

== Topography ==
Bakestall reaches a height of 673 m (2,208 ft) and strictly speaking it is not a separate fell being just an insignificant rise on Skiddaw’s northern slopes. AW Wainwright gave Bakestall a separate chapter in his Pictorial Guide to the Lakeland Fells because of the impressive Dead Crags which fall beneath the summit and the fine waterfall of Whitewater Dash at the fells foot. Indeed, Bakestall was not even mentioned on the old Ordnance Survey one-inch map for many years, a situation now rectified on its metric equivalent probably because of Wainwright's having drawn attention to the fell.

Dead Crags are composed of Skiddaw Slate and drop 150 metres (500 ft) down into the corrie on the northern side of the fell. The crags do not attract rock climbers because of the crumbly nature of the slate, which has much vegetation growing within it. Whitewater Dash is highly rated as one of the finest falls in the national park as Dash Beck descends in a series of cataracts; were it situated in a more accessible part of the Lake District it would be a major attraction. Bakestall had a lead mine on its slopes many years ago, the adit being situated at the side of Dead Beck on the western periphery of the fell. All drainage from Bakestall goes north to join Dash Beck and then to Bassenthwaite Lake.

== Ascents ==
Bakestall can be climbed as part of the less crowded northern approach to Skiddaw using the rough track to Skiddaw House (part of the Cumbria Way) as far as Whitewater Dash falls and then ascending Birkett Edge to reach the summit. A fence can be followed up Birkett Edge although walking at the side of the corrie edge gives an opportunity to examine the crags. From the summit of Bakestall it is a two-kilometre (1 1/4-mile) walk south west and then south with 275 metres (900 ft) of ascent to reach the summit of Skiddaw.

== Summit ==
The summit of the fell is at a turn in the fence, although Wainwright had his top of the fell 100 metres further north, which is a better viewpoint and is marked by a fair-sized cairn, unusual in the grassy northern fells. The view from the top of fell is severely curtailed by the bulk of Skiddaw to the south and there is no view of the main part of Lakeland. However, it is possible to view the Solway Firth and the Scottish Border hills.
