= Longlands Fell =

Mountain in the Lake District, England

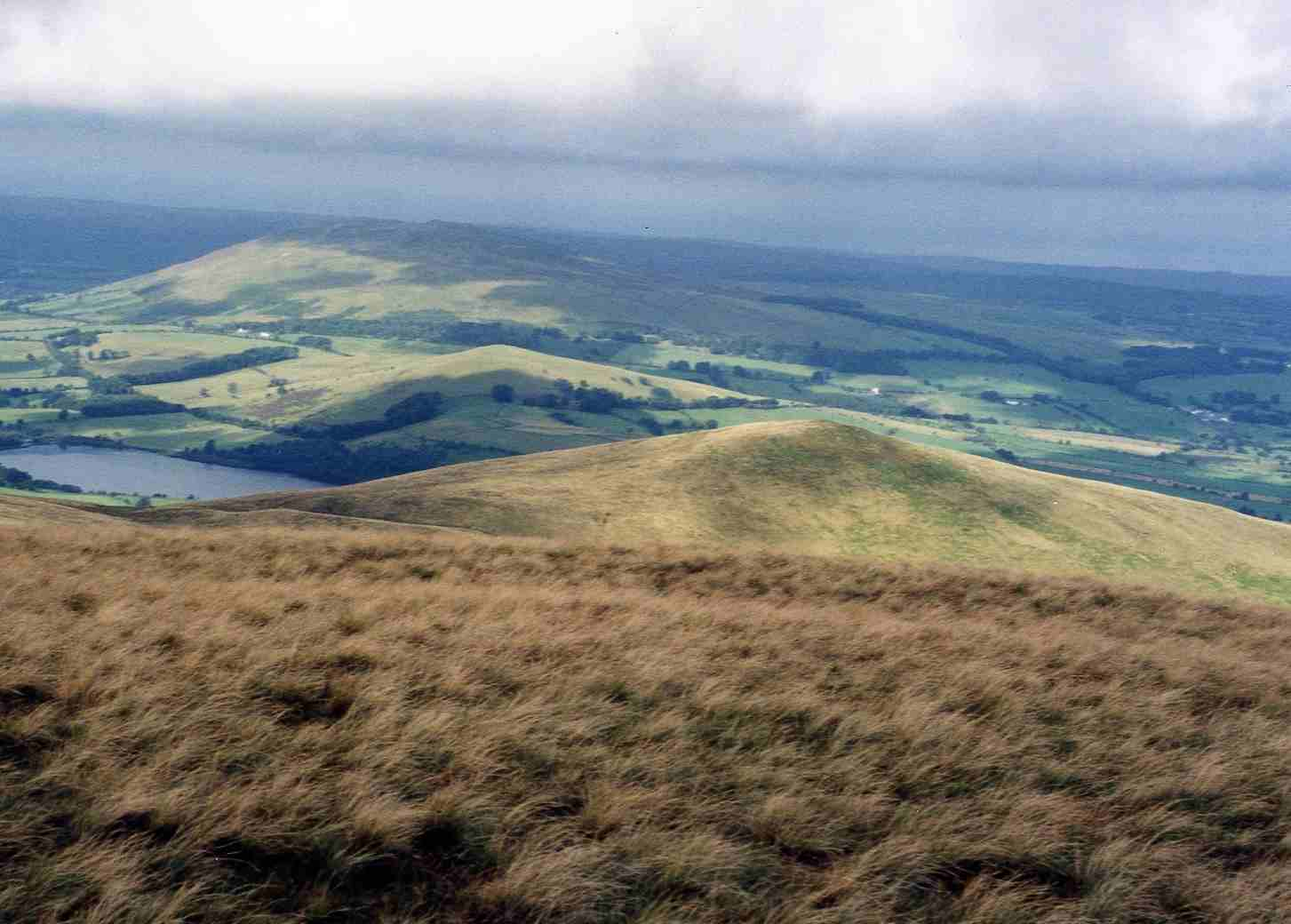
- Longlands Fell seen from Brae Fell.

Highest point
- Elevation: 483 m (1,585 ft)
- Prominence: c. 33 m
- Parent peak: Lowthwaite Fell
- Listing: Wainwright
- Coordinates: 54°42′27″N 3°07′36″W

Geography
- Location within the Lake District Location within the former Allerdale Borough
- Location: Cumbria, England
- Parent range: Lake District, Northern Fells
- OS grid: NY275353
- Topo map: OS Landranger 89, 90 OS Explorer 4

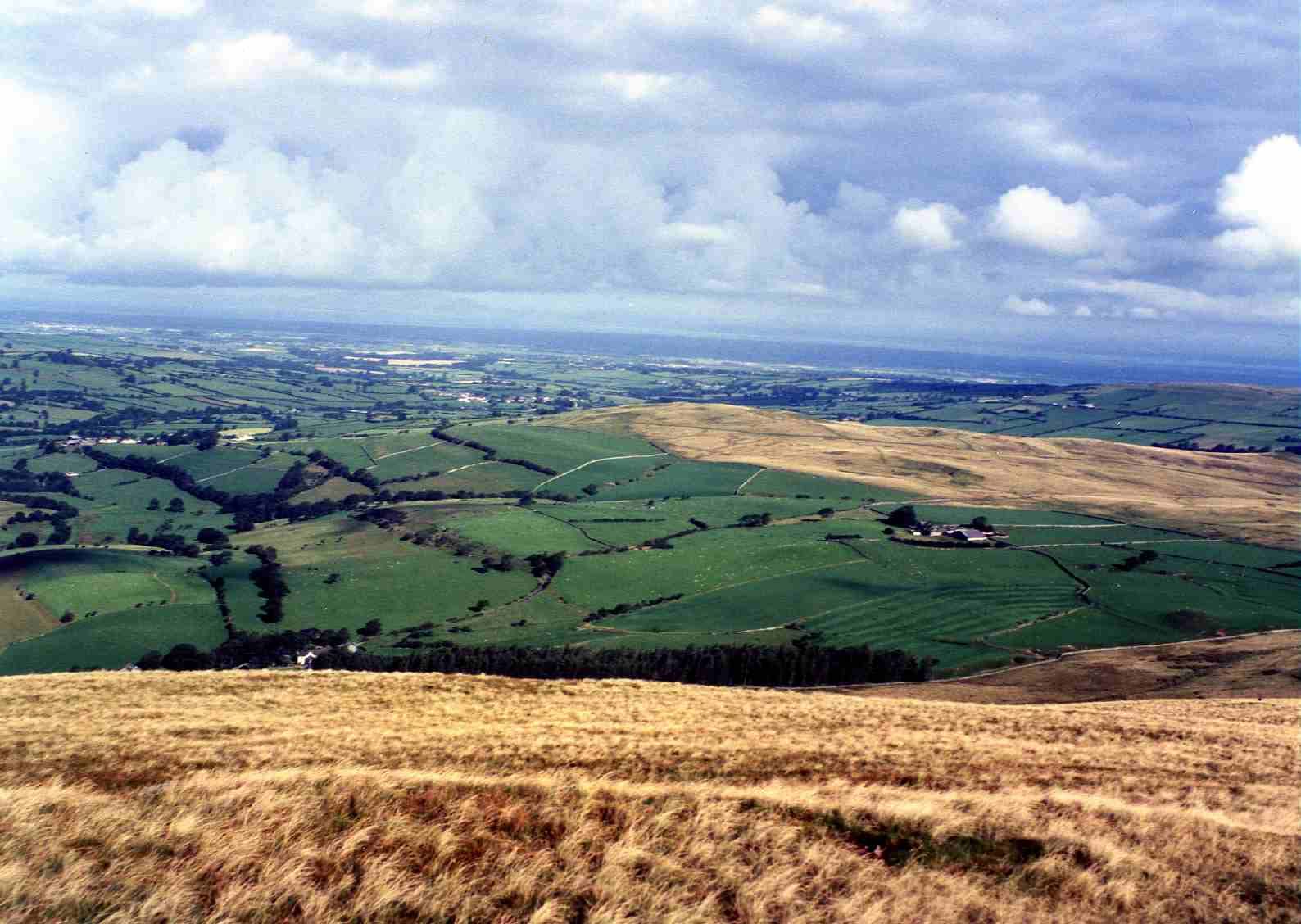
Looking north from Longlands Fell across the Solway plain.

Longlands Fell is a small fell in the northern part of the English Lake District. It is situated in the high ground known as the Uldale Fells, 5.5 kilometres south west of the village of Caldbeck. It reaches a height of 483 m (1,585 ft) and it is (along with Binsey) the most northerly fell in the Lake District.

== Topography ==
Longlands Fell is characterised by grassy, smooth slopes which drop down gradually to the lowlands north of Lakeland. The other Uldale Fells are Great Sca Fell, Great Cockup and Meal Fell.

== Mining ==
Unlike the adjacent Caldbeck Fells, which were heavily mined for minerals, the Uldale Fells have only ever had one mine on them and that was on Longlands Fell. The Longlands Fell copper mine operated in the second half of the 19th century but was soon found to be uneconomical and abandoned, one of the levels is now dammed to provide water to the village of Uldale. Just to the north of Longlands Fell on the adjoining small Aughtertree Fell (300 metres) are signs of an Iron Age farming settlement first settled 3,000 years ago and probably deserted during the Dark Ages.

== Ascents ==
Longlands Fell is one of the easier fell walks in the Lake District, the ascent starts from the hamlet of Longlands, which is a small group of houses and takes the track north east which skirts the base of the fell, this is part of the low level alternative of the Cumbria Way, when the foot of the northern ridge is reached this is followed up easy slopes to reach the summit. Longlands Fell is often climbed in conjunction with other fells, being connected to the south east by a 2.5 kilometre ridge to Great Sca Fell which in turn gives access along its ridges to the rest of the fells in the area.

== Summit ==
The view from the top takes in the Solway Firth and the Galloway hills to the north. To the south are good views of Skiddaw with the fells around the Whinlatter forest well seen.
