= Northern Fells =

Region of the Cumbrian Mountains

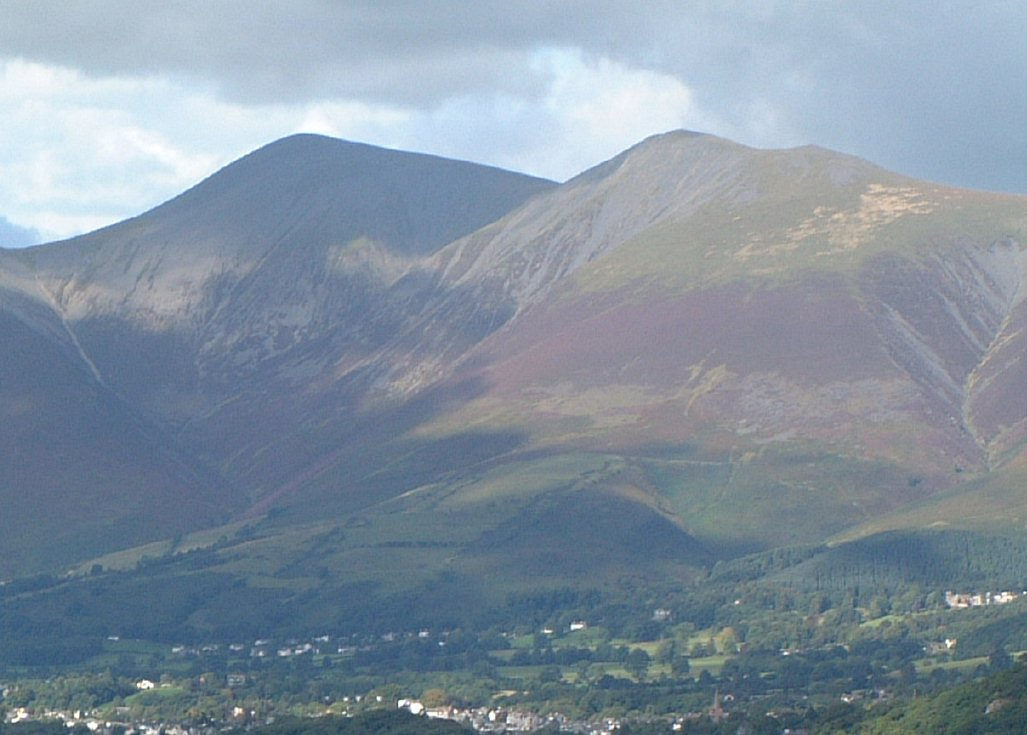
Skiddaw (left) and Little Man

The Northern Fells are a part of the Cumbrian Mountains in the Lake District of England. Including Skiddaw, they occupy a wide area to the north of Keswick. Smooth, sweeping slopes predominate, with a minimum of tarns or crags. Blencathra in the south-east of the group is the principal exception to this trend.

== Partition of the Lakeland fells ==
The Lake District is a National Park in the north-west of the country, which, in addition to its lakes, contains a complex range of hills. These are known locally as fells and range from low hills to the highest ground in England. Hundreds of tops exist, and many writers have attempted to draw up definitive lists. In doing so, the compilers frequently divide the range into smaller areas to aid their description.

The most influential of all such authors was Alfred Wainwright, whose Pictorial Guide to the Lakeland Fells series has sold in excess of 2 million copies, being in print continuously since the first volume was published in 1952. Wainwright divided the fells into seven geographical areas, each surrounded by valleys and low passes. While any such division must be arbitrary – and later writers have deviated to a greater or lesser extent from this blueprint – Wainwright's sevenfold division remains the best-known partitioning of the fells into "sub ranges", each with its own characteristics. The Northern Fells are one of these divisions, covered by volume 5 of Wainwright's work.

== Boundaries ==
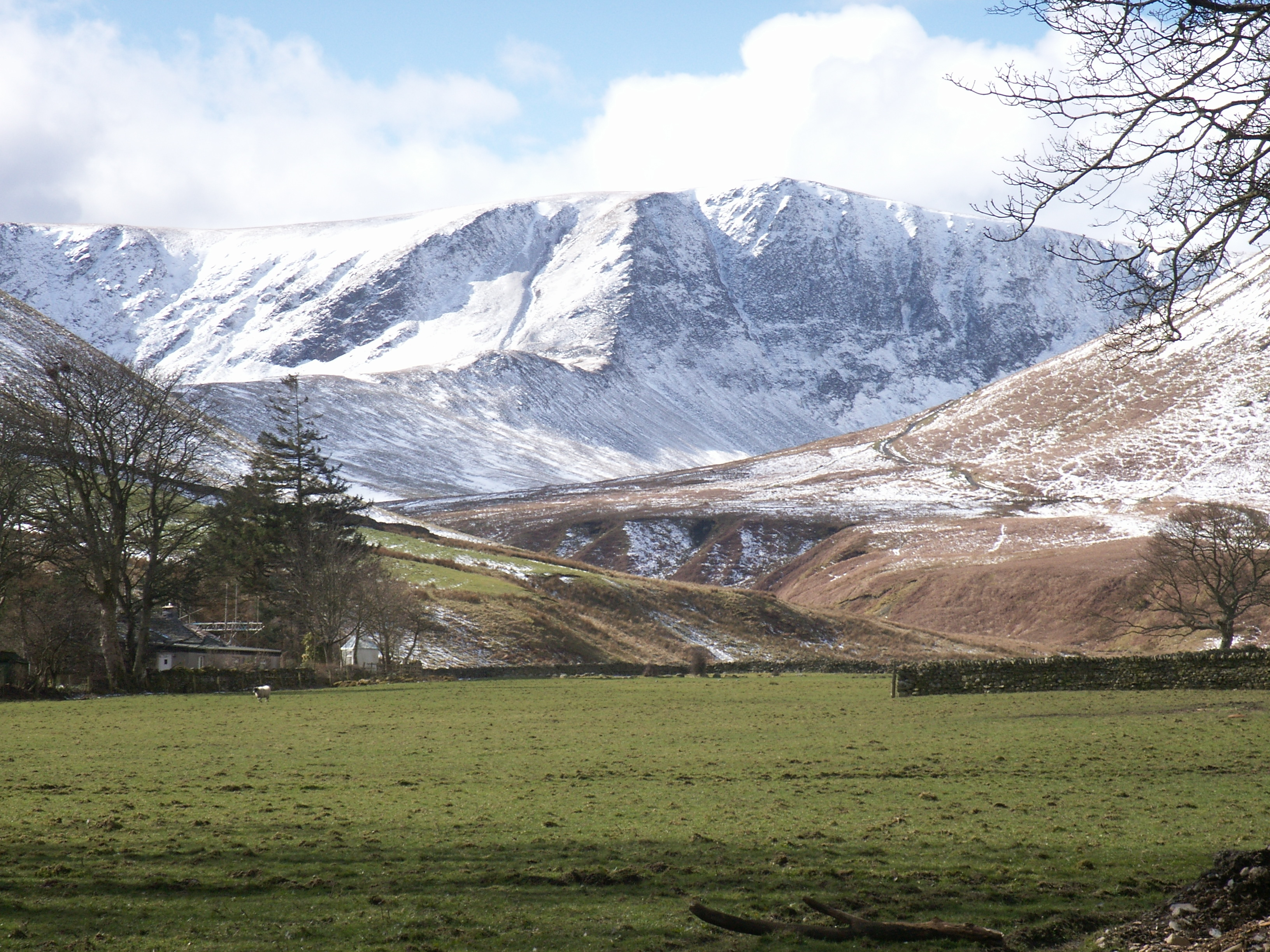
Bannerdale Crags from Mungrisdale

The Northern Fells form a self-contained unit, quite remote from the other ranges. The western boundary is formed by the course of the River Derwent north of Keswick and the southern perimeter by the River Greta, one of its principal feeders. The River Caldew bounds the eastern edge of the group, flowing away towards Carlisle. At Caldbeck the Calder is joined by the Whelpo Beck, which drains many of the northern slopes. Only on the east, between the headwaters of the Greta and Caldew, does a bridge of higher ground strike out to connect with the rest of Lakeland, a long ridge curving southward to connect with Great Mell Fell in the Eastern Fells. This ridge, whilst significant topographically, is in many places unnoticed on the ground. The deep trough of Bassenthwaite wards off the North Western Fells, while the Central Fells rise beyond Keswick and the Greta.

North of the area defined by Wainwright, the countryside takes on a moorland character, gradually declining towards the Solway Firth. Some of the minor tops in this area were covered by Wainwright in his later Outlying Fells volume, published in 1974.

== Topography ==
The Northern Fells occupy a circular area about 10 miles (16 km) in diameter. The centre is slightly lower, an area of upland grazing and marshland known as Skiddaw Forest (although the only trees form the windbreak of Skiddaw House. This isolated building, 3 miles (4.8 km) from roads or other habitation, was once a shepherd's bothy. It currently serves as a youth hostel. Skiddaw Forest stands at the head of the three major rivers of the Northern Fells. The Caldew begins eastward, Dash Beck flows north west and the Glenderaterra to the south. These streams divide the circular area into three distinct sections.

The highest ground is in the south-west, between the Glenderaterra and Dash Beck. This is the Skiddaw group, well known in views down Borrowdale and Derwentwater with its steep but sweeping slopes, deep folds and smooth texture. Skiddaw stands in the centre of the group, surrounded by its many satellites. Above Bassenthwaite are Ullock Pike, Long Side, Carl Side and the sometimes wooded Dodd. Eastward are Skiddaw Little Man, Lonscale Fell and the diminutive Latrigg, a short climb from Keswick.

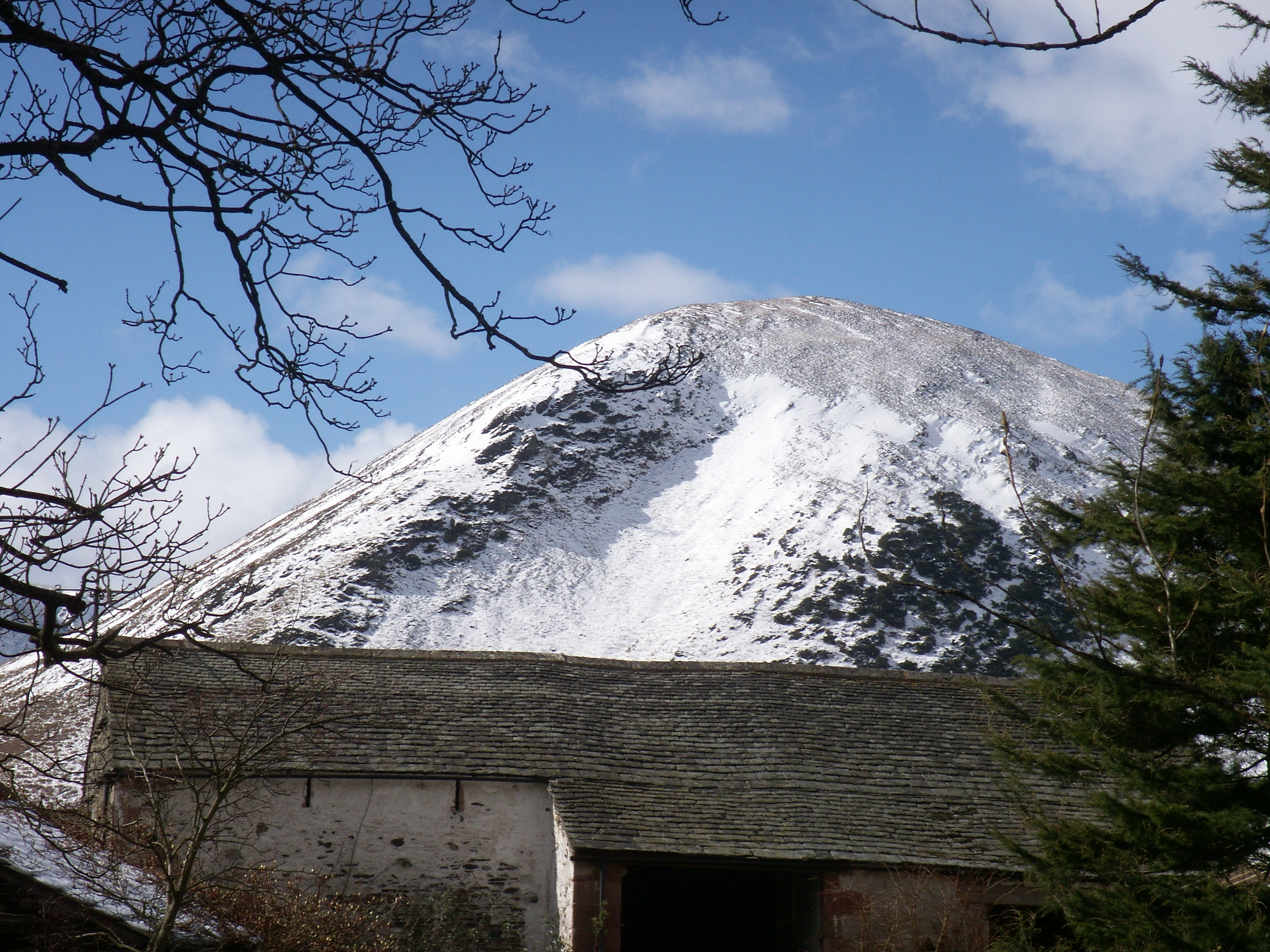
The Tongue, Bowscale Fell

The south-eastern sector is formed around Blencathra, with its crags and knife-edge ridges overlooking the Keswick to Penrith road. The northern ridges lead to Souther Fell, Bannerdale Crags, Bowscale Fell and Mungrisdale Common, with its barely discernible summit.

The northern section is known commonly as "Back o'Skiddaw" and contains many lower fells, although the paths to climb them can be long. In these hills is much evidence of historic mining activity. The group has a central apex at Knott with Great Calva standing to the south above Skiddaw Forest. High Pike (Caldbeck) and Carrock Fell rise to the east, marching along the Caldew valley. The western ridges are more complex and include Great Sca Fell, Meal Fell, Great Cockup, Little Cockup, Brae Fell and Longlands Fell. Alone to the extreme west across the tarn of Over Water stands Binsey.

== Access for walkers ==
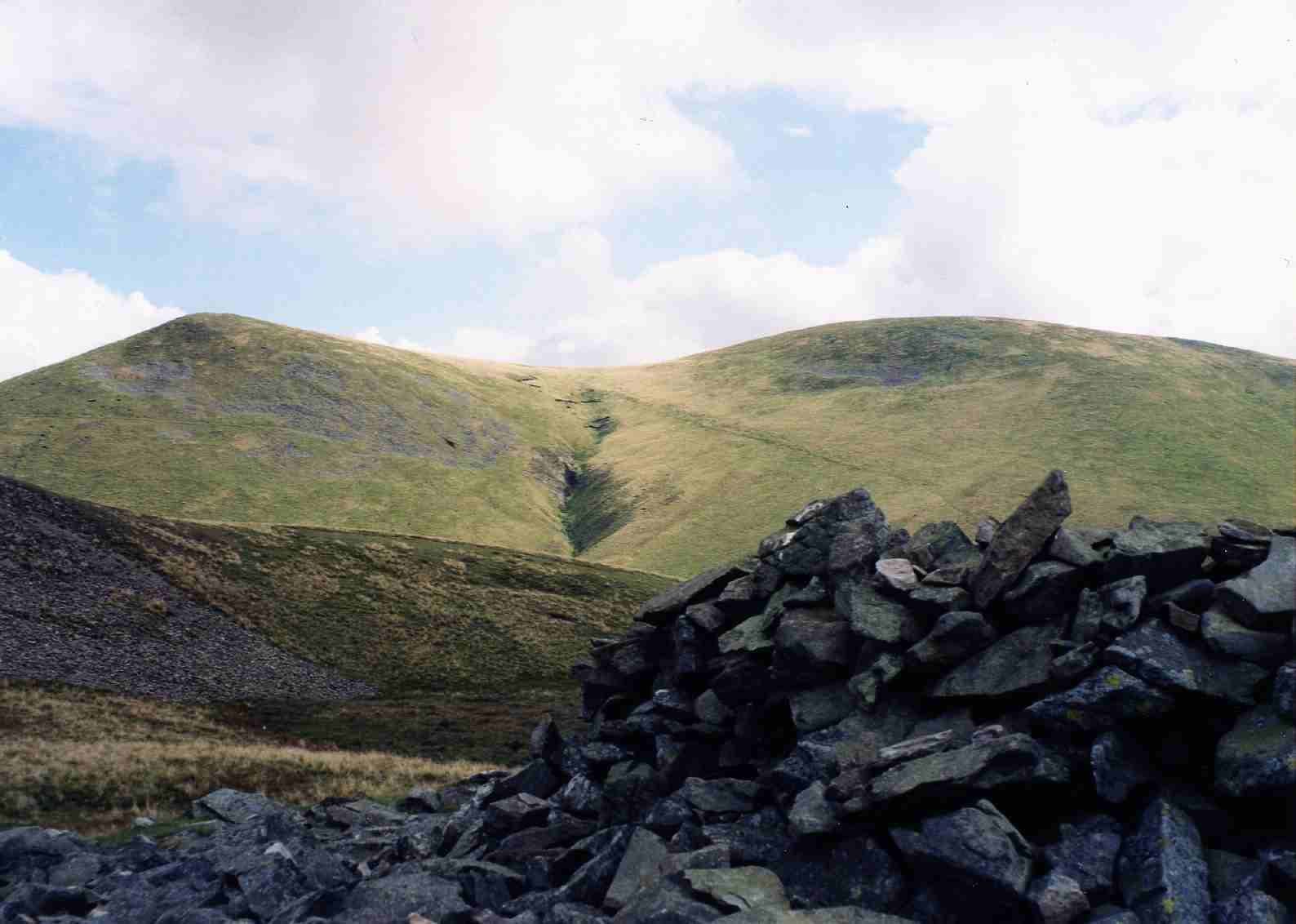
Great Sca Fell from Meal Fell

The Northern Fells are entirely surrounded by roads, but traversed by none. Keswick and Threlkeld provide good access to the south from the A66 road for the Skiddaw and Blencathra groups, respectively. The minor road along the eastern boundary connects the hamlets of Mosedale and Mungrisdale and gives equally good access to the Caldew and other eastern valleys. Further minor roads circuit the northern perimeter for Back o'Skiddaw, connecting finally to the Keswick–Carlisle road along the shore of Bassenthwaite. From here the Dash Valley and Longside Edge can be reached. A service track follows Dash Beck past its major fall (Whitewater Dash) to Skiddaw House, the easiest entrance to Skiddaw Forest.

The tourist route up Skiddaw will generally be busy, but solitude can easily be found in the northern fells.

== See also ==
- Eastern Fells
- Far Eastern Fells
- Central Fells
- Southern Fells
- North Western Fells
- Western Fells
