= Great Calva =

Mountain in the Lake District, England

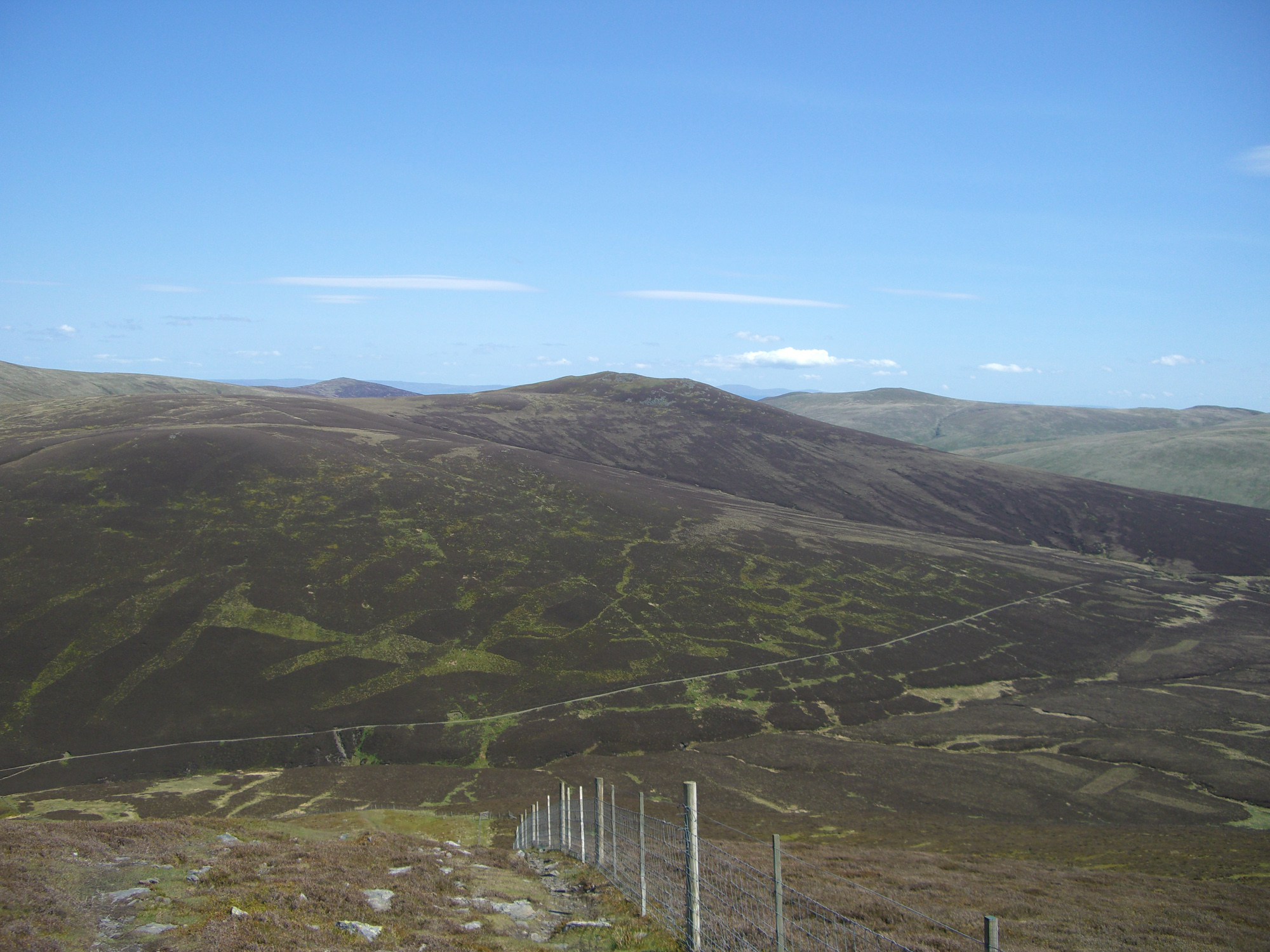
- Seen from Birkett Edge on Bakestall, 2 kilometres (1 1/4 miles) to the west. The track to Skiddaw House runs along the base of the fell.

Highest point
- Elevation: 690 m (2,260 ft)
- Prominence: c. 142 m (470 ft)
- Parent peak: Knott
- Listing: Wainwright, Hewitt, Nuttall
- Coordinates: 54°40′08″N 3°06′07″W

Geography
- Location within the Lake District
- Location: Cumbria, England
- Parent range: Lake District, Northern Fells
- OS grid: NY291312
- Topo map: OS Explorer OL4

Listed summits of Great Calva
Name	Grid ref	Height	Status
Little Calva	NY282314	642 m (2,106 ft)	Nuttall

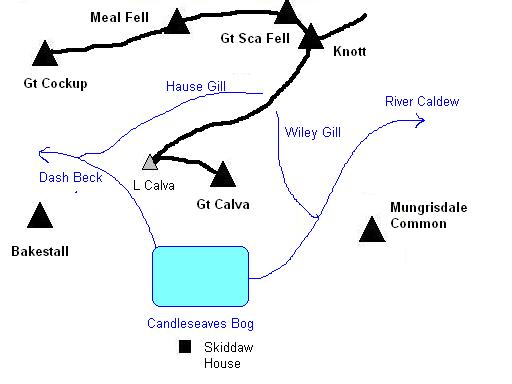
sketch map of Great Calva

Great Calva is a fell in the Lake District, England. It is in the Northern Fells, lying roughly at the centre of this region of high ground. As a result, it is distant from roads and quite remote by Lakeland standards. Great Calva stands at the head of a major geological fault running through the centre of the Lake District, and so from the summit it is possible to see all the way south over Thirlmere. The subsidiary summit of Little Calva lies to the west. It is in the centre of the Skiddaw Group SSSI.

== Topography ==
Skiddaw and Blencathra are the best known of the Northern Fells, fronting the range as they loom above Keswick and the road to Penrith. Behind this wall is a further group of fells, commonly referred to as Back o' Skiddaw. This group is centred upon Knott and Great Calva is its southernmost top.

To the south of Great Calva – at the centre of the Northern Fells – is Skiddaw Forest, a marshy upland area at around 1,300 feet (400 m) surrounded on all sides by higher fells. Three streams flow from Skiddaw Forest, dividing the Northern Fells into three sectors. Dash Beck runs north west, the River Caldew north east and the River Glenderaterra south. The three groups of fells can conveniently be thought of as the Skiddaw massif, the Blencathra group and Back O'Skiddaw. The single building in Skiddaw Forest is Skiddaw House which has variously seen service as a shepherds' bothy and a Youth Hostel.

Great Calva appears from Skiddaw Forest as a steep sided pyramid, clad predominantly in heather. The summit is a curving ridge one-half-mile (800 m) long, with Great Calva at the eastern end and Little Calva to the west. The ridge itself is extremely wet underfoot. From between the two tops, Dead Beck runs down into Candleseaves Bog, the source of both the Caldew and Dash Beck. Great Calva has a prominent southern spur, around which the Caldew flows before steering north east for the Eden Valley. In a strict topographical sense Candleseaves Bog is the connection between Great Calva and Skiddaw, but it could hardly be described as a ridge route.

Running north east from Little Calva is a ridge which drops to a col at 1,797 feet (548 m), before rising up the flanks of Knott. There are a couple of small tarns on the Great Calva side of the depression. From the col Wiley Gill runs south east to join the Caldew and Hause Gill flows westward to Dash Beck.

Little Calva sends out a further descending ridge to the north west, running alongside Dash Beck. A series of spurs named Black Nettle Hause, Little Nettle Hause and White Hause drop toward the river. Between Black Nettle Hause and Birkett Edge on Bakestall the beck reaches Whitewater Dash, a fine series of waterfalls.

== Summit ==
A cairn stands at the top of the south ridge with another a little to the north at the highest point. The remains of an old fence runs between the two. A few yards east of the summit a stone windshelter has been constructed. There is some rock in evidence but grass and heather predominate.

The view southward, particularly from the lower cairn is unexpectedly good. Looking directly down the Glenderaterra Valley and the Vale of St John, the gap gives an unimpeded view as far as Loughrigg and Steel Fell. Additionally above the flanks of Lonscale Fell Great Gable and the Scafells appear. The nearer fells by contrast turn their backs upon Great Calva, the northward vista being less inspiring.

== Ascents ==
Great Calva is mainly covered in heather, which makes walking relatively difficult. Approaching from the northwest, one can take the bridleway between Great Cockup and Little Calva from Orthwaite to reach the col between Knott and the summit. Alternatively, Great Calva can be climbed up the pathless south ridge from Skiddaw Forest, which creates a number of options for starting points. The Skiddaw House supply road follows Dash Beck up from Peter House Farm, or a good track runs alongside the Caldew from the road at Mosedale. Access is also possible up the Glenderaterra valley from the south, starting either from the Gale Road car park or the vicinity of Threlkeld.
