= Great Sca Fell =

Fell in the Lake District, England

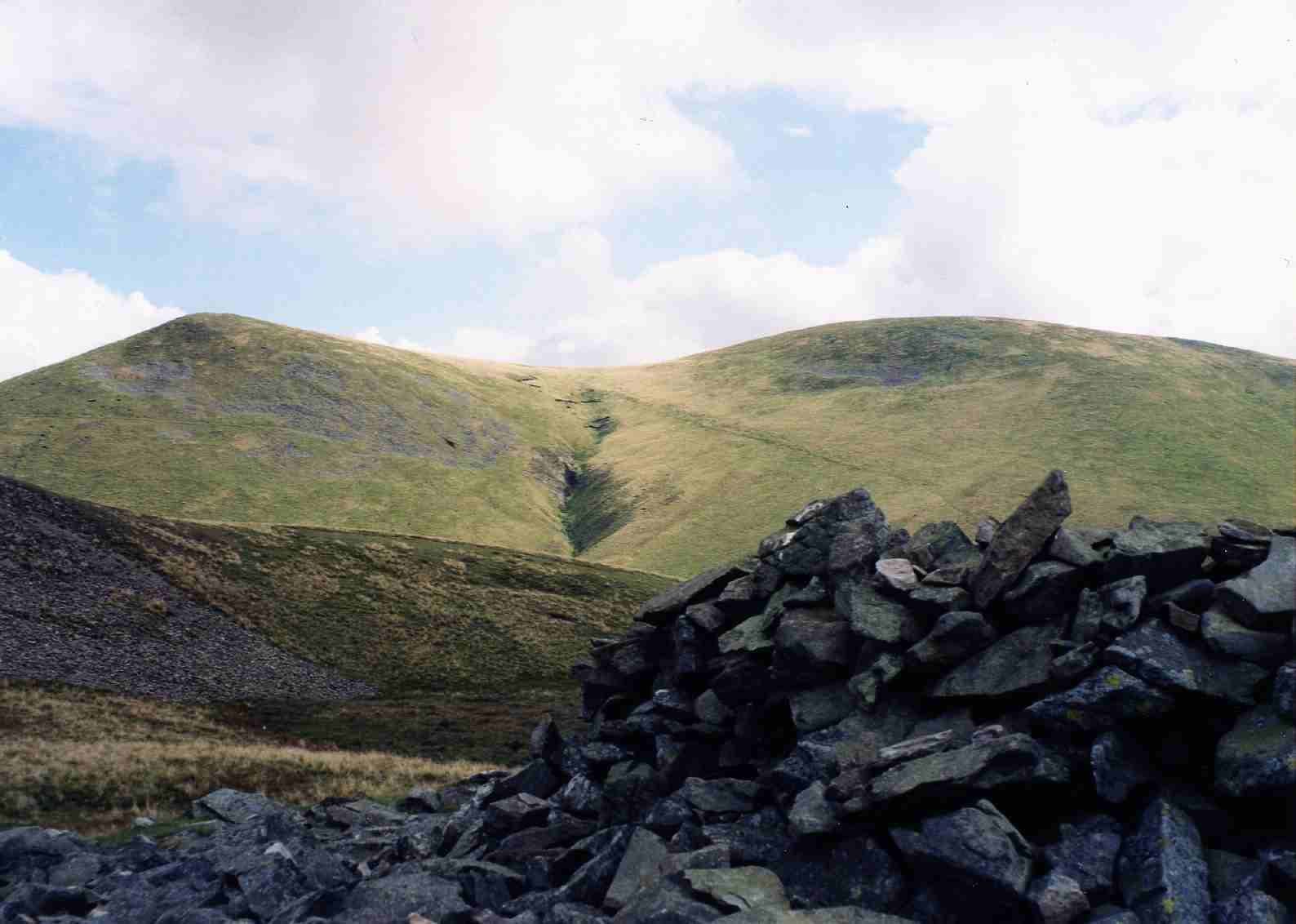
- Great Sca Fell (right) and Little Sca Fell (left) seen from Meal Fell.

Highest point
- Elevation: 651 m (2,136 ft)
- Prominence: 13 m (43 ft)
- Parent peak: Knott
- Listing: Wainwright
- Coordinates: 54°41′39″N 3°06′05″W

Geography
- Location within the Lake District Location within the former Allerdale Borough
- Location: Cumbria, England
- Parent range: Lake District, Northern Fells
- OS grid: NY291338
- Topo map: OS Landranger 89, 90 OS Explorer 4

Great Sca Fell is a fell in the English Lake District, seven kilometres (4 1/2 miles) southwest of the village of Caldbeck. It is the highest of the four Uldale Fells, the other three being Longlands Fell, Meal Fell and Great Cockup. It is a Wainwright, and the lowest of the lakeland "Sca fells", the other two being Scafell and Scafell Pike.

== Topography ==
The Uldale fells are a smooth and grassy sheep pasture which rise in three ridges from the low land to the north and culminate at the summit of Great Sca Fell at a height of 651 metres (2,136 ft). Although the hill is a ‘Wainwright’ fell and comfortably crests the 2000-foot mark, it does not meet the criteria for any of the other major hill lists; with a prominence of 13 metres (43 ft) to the higher fell of Knott it narrowly fails to qualify as a Nuttall.

The fell has twin summits, Great and Little Sca Fell, with Little Sca Fell, which reaches an elevation of 635 metres (2,083 feet), lying 400 metres (1/4 mile) north of the main summit across a low col, it has a more substantial cairn and a strange depression which has been augmented by a low wall to make a wind shelter. The summit of Great Sca Fell itself is a broad flat plateau on which the highest point could be located almost at any point within a 15-metre radius, however it has a small cairn to mark the recognised top. Four ridges radiate from the summit to the adjoining fells of Knott (south), Brae Fell (north), Meal Fell (west) and Longlands Fell (north west) making Great Sca Fell strategically important when walking these lonely hills. The River Ellen has its source on the western slopes of Great Sca Fell, flowing westerly to the Solway Firth. Drainage from the east of the fell flows eventually into the River Caldew and then the Eden to again reach the sea at the Solway.

== Ascents ==
Ascents of Great Sca Fell are usually started from the minor road which skirts the Uldale fells to the north west with the hamlets of Orthwaite and Longlands as likely starting points, either approaching up the valleys or climbing the other fells on the way and then approaching by the connecting ridges.

== Summit ==
The highlight of the view from the top of the fell is northwards to the Solway plain and beyond to the Scottish Borders. The view of Lakeland to the south is severely curtailed by the Skiddaw massif but there is distant view of the Bowfell group of fells almost 30 kilometres away through a gap in the hills.
