= Carrock Fell =

Mountain in the Lake District, England

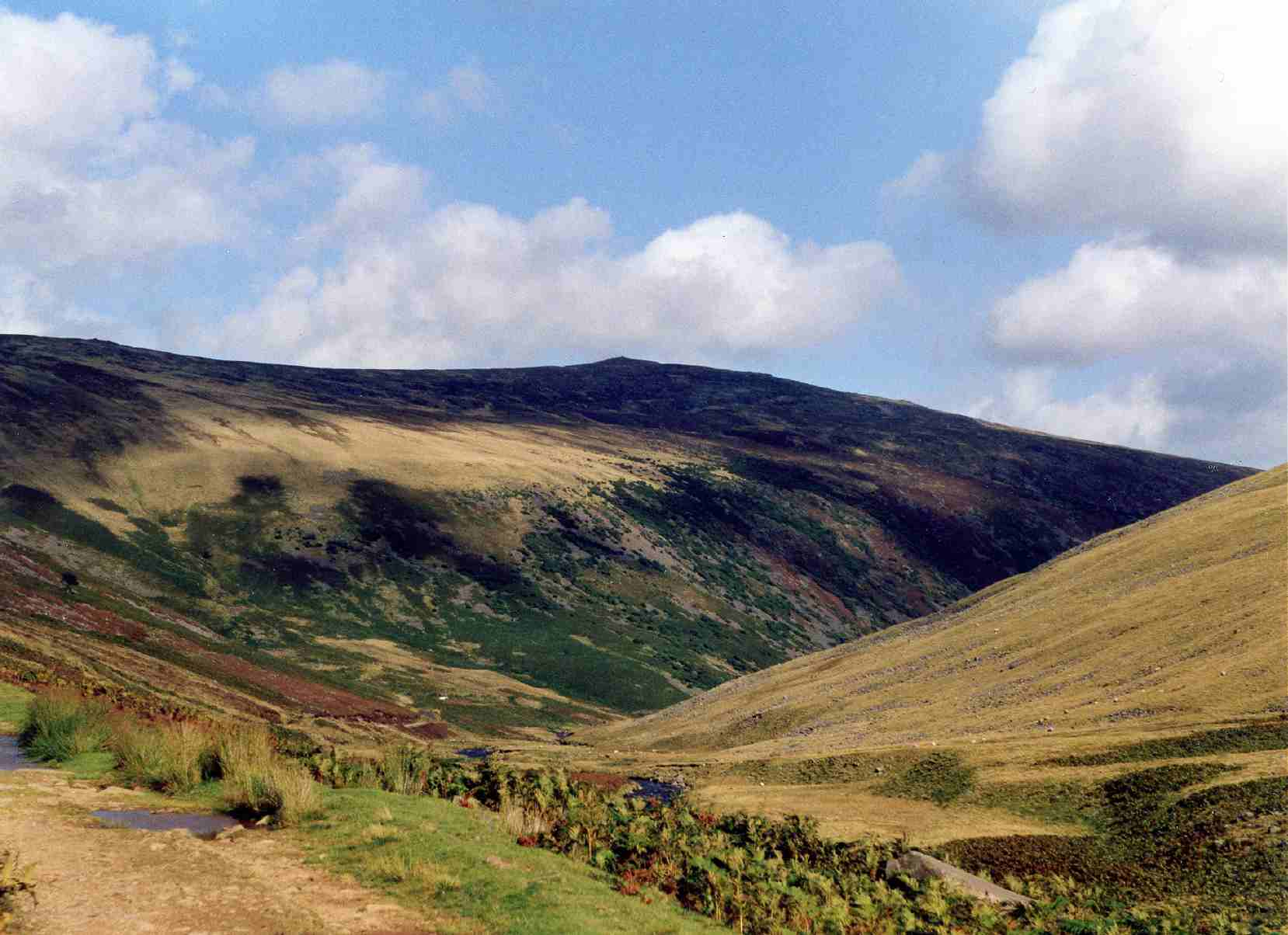
- Carrock Fell seen from the Caldew valley near the site of the Carrock mine

Highest point
- Elevation: 661 m (2,169 ft)
- Prominence: 91 m (299 ft)
- Parent peak: Knott
- Listing: Hewitt, Nuttall, Wainwright
- Coordinates: 54°41′37″N 3°01′23″W

Geography
- Location within the Lake District
- Location: Cumbria, England
- Parent range: Lake District, Northern Fells
- OS grid: NY341336
- Topo map: OS Landranger 90 OS Explorer 5

Carrock Fell is a fell in the English Lake District, situated in the northern region of the national park, 8 miles (13 kilometres) north-east of Keswick.

== Toponymy ==
The name Carrock is a Brittonic formation. Sometimes stated as deriving from carreg meaning "rock, stony place", early attestations of the name suggest that is more likely to represent *carr, "rock, hard-surface", with the adjectival and nominal suffix -ǭg, sometimes meaning "abounding in".

== Height ==
The fell's elevation seems to have decreased by two metres in recent years. The Ordnance Survey now give it a height of 661 metres (2,169 ft) in the most recent map updates after having recorded it at 663 metres (2,175 ft) for many years. Many guidebooks and mountain tables still record 663 metres as the “official” height.

== Topography ==
Well known Lake District scribe Alfred Wainwright rated Carrock Fell as the second most exciting and interesting fell in the northern area of Lakeland (after Blencathra and before Skiddaw), it has special appeal regarding geology, mining and history and its rocky nature makes it stand out from the neighbouring fells which are mainly grassy and smooth. Carrock Fell is bounded to the south and east by the River Caldew into which all drainage from the fell goes to find its way eventually to the Solway Firth.

== Geology ==
Carrock Fell's geology is unique in the Lake District in that it is predominantly composed of gabbro, a rough igneous rock that also makes up the famous Black Cuillin on the Isle of Skye. Gabbro is an excellent “clean” rock for climbers and Carrock Fell offers the only rock climbing of quality in the northern fells, the majority of which are made up of the unsuitable crumbly Skiddaw Slate. The fell is rich in mineral ores and has been mined extensively for many centuries with tungsten, lead, arsenic and iron all being extracted from the fell. The most famous mine on the fell was the Carrock Mine, the only source of tungsten in Britain outside of Devon and Cornwall. The mine was situated in Grainsgill Beck on the south western flanks of the fell with the main adit at a height of 340 metres. The mine was opened in 1854 but has only been worked in periods when the price of tungsten has been high, for example during wartime, the mine was worked extensively during both World Wars and the Korean War when supplies of Tungsten were threatened. The mine closed in 1981 and in 1988 the site was bulldozed and landscaped to its original outline.

== History ==
Carrock Fell is also the site of an Iron Age hill fort which crowns the summit. Only the foundations of the walls remain. The fort is oval shaped and is believed to have been built by the Celts and destroyed by the Romans in their conquest of northern England. Carrock Fell's other claim to historical fame is that it was climbed by well-known British novelists Charles Dickens and Wilkie Collins in 1857 during a tour of northern Cumberland. Dickens had read about the fell and had made up his mind to climb it. Collins sprained his ankle and Dickens had to help him back down the mountain, according to The New Yorker 7/25/11 in an article by Jonathan Rosen. (Collins wrote the first English-language detective novel, The Moonstone.) Later, Collins and Dickens collaborated on a humorous narrative based in part upon their climb up Carrock Fell, entitled The Lazy Tour of Two Idle Apprentices.

== Ascents ==
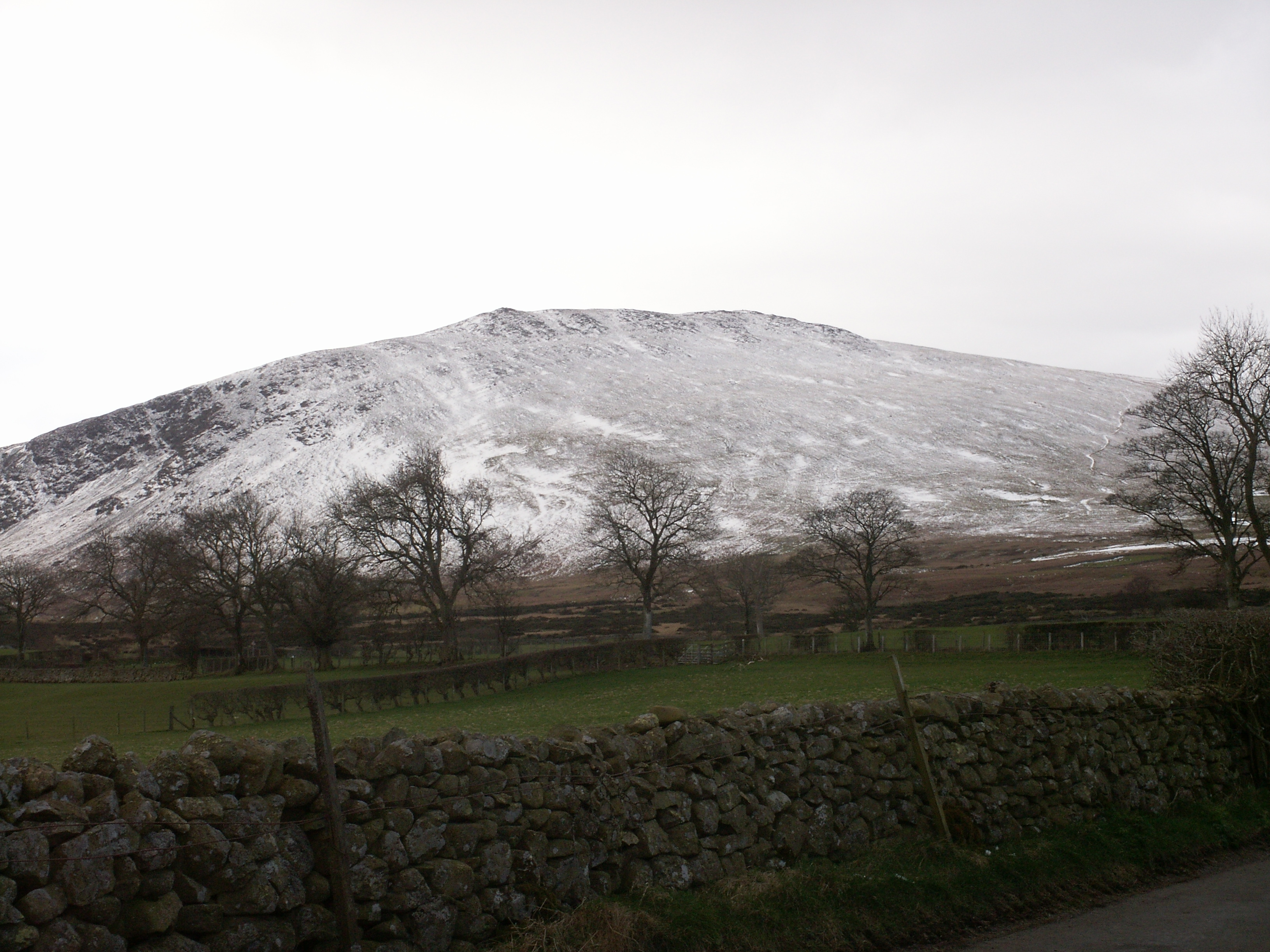
Carrock Fell from the north

Despite all its other attractions, Carrock Fell is primarily the haunt of the fell walker; it is mostly climbed from the surfaced road which goes to the site of the Carrock Mine. It is possible to leave a car at NY328326 and then climb the fell by the steep south-west slopes. Carrock Fell can also be climbed from the road between Mungrisedale and Hesket Newmarket, threading a way through the craggy and bouldery eastern slopes known as "Apronful of Stones".

== Summit ==
The top of the fell offers a good view to the east towards the Pennines across the Eden valley. Carrock Fell has two subsidiary summits, Round Knott (603 metres (1,978 ft)) and Milton Hill (607 metres (1,991 ft)) which lie to the west of the main summit on the ridge which continues to the adjoining fell of High Pike.
