= Knott, Caldbeck =

Mountain in the Lake District, England

Knott
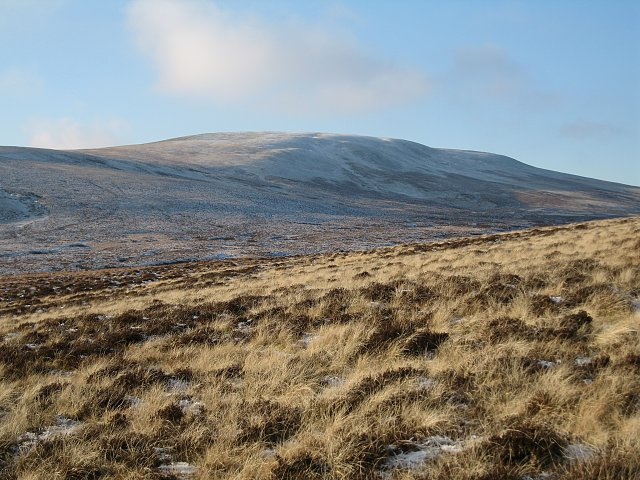
- Knott from Lingy Hut

Highest point
- Elevation: 710 m (2,330 ft)
- Prominence: 242 m (794 ft)
- Parent peak: Skiddaw
- Listing: Marilyn, Hewitt, Wainwright, Nuttall
- Coordinates: 54°41′10″N 3°05′37″W

Geography
- Location within the Lake District
- Location: Cumbria, England
- Parent range: Lake District, Northern Fells
- OS grid: NY296329
- Topo map: OS Landrangers 89, 90

Knott is a mountain in the northern part of the English Lake District. It is the highest point of the Back o'Skiddaw region, an area of wild and unfrequented moorland to the north of Skiddaw and Blencathra. Other tops in this region include High Pike, Carrock Fell and Great Calva. The fell's slopes are mostly smooth, gentle, and covered in grass, with a few deep ravines. It stands a long way from a road and requires a long walk across the moor top get to it; this, as well as the fact that it is hidden from the rest of the Lake District by the two aforementioned giants, make it one of the most unfrequented tops in the Lakes. When it is climbed it is most often from Mungrisdale or from the north via Great Sca Fell. The word Knott is of Cumbric origin, and means simply "hill".

== Topography ==
Skiddaw and Blencathra are the best known of the Northern Fells, fronting the range as they loom above Keswick and the road to Penrith. Behind this wall is a further group of fells, commonly referred to as Back o' Skiddaw. Knott stands at the centre of this group, in addition to being the highest point.

The Back o'Skiddaw group is separated from Blencathra and the Skiddaw massif by Skiddaw Forest. It is not a woodland area — other than the windbreak of Skiddaw House — but is a former royal forest (an area once set aside for hunting) and is today a marshy upland area at around 1,300 feet (400 m) surrounded on all sides by higher fells. Three major streams flow from Skiddaw Forest, dividing the Northern Fells into three sectors. Dash Beck runs north-west, the River Caldew north-east and the River Glenderaterra south, between Skiddaw and Blencathra.

Knott itself is a long whale-backed ridge running for three miles (five kilometres) in an east–west direction. With the exception of the extreme east and west, the fell has broad and gentle contours clad primarily in grass. Many of the streams draining it have cut deeply into Knott's flanks, exposing yellow and red soils which are visible in distant views.

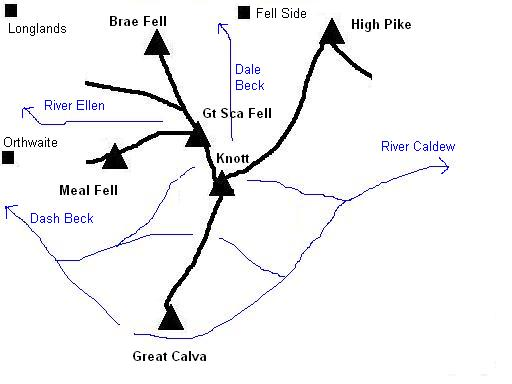
sketch map of Knott

The western end of the fell is Burn Tod, which descends roughly between Burntod and Hause Gills, both tributaries of Dash Beck. To the north is a parallel but shorter shoulder, Frozen Fell, and these two spurs are the only part of the fell which drain westward to the River Derwent.

From the south of the summit a ridge descends across a narrow col to the neighbouring fell of Great Calva. A further spur on this flank, across to the east, is named Snab. Wiley Gill and Burdell Gill fall on this side to the River Caldew and, ultimately, the Eden at Carlisle.

The eastern terminus of the summit ridge is Coomb Height. At the base of the slope, amid rough ground, are the remains of Carrock Fell Mine. Coombe Height is bordered by Wet Swine Gill and Grainsgill Beck, further tributaries of the Caldew.

Two connecting ridges run north from Knott, separated by the deep ravines of Roughton Gill. The western arms drops across an area of bog and with little reascent arrives at the summit of Great Sca Fell. The eastern branch crosses Miller Moss and then runs at high level for two miles (three kilometres) to High Pike, first passing the subsidiary tops of Great Lingy Hill and Harestones.

=== Miller Moss ===
In August 2018 it was reported that Miller Moss, also known as Little Lingy Hill, had been re-surveyed and measured as 610.1 metres (2,002 ft) with a prominence of 19.7 metres (65 ft), enabling it to be classed as a mountain and included in the list of Nuttalls.

== Summit ==
Wainwright noted of the summit that "If the party consists of more than one person and if, further, a bat, ball and wickets can be found in the depths of somebody's rucksack, a cricket match can be played on turf many a county ground might covet." Amidst the grass a cairn has been built. Further such markers adorn the tops of Coomb Height, Burn Tod and Snab, but the ridge top is otherwise featureless and the paths faint and intermittent.

The view southward is constrained by Blencathra and Skiddaw, neither displaying their best side, but between the two is a narrow slice of central Lakeland. This includes a section of distant Thirlmere along with the Scafells. To the north are the Solway Firth and the hills of south west Scotland, but there is little interest to the foreground.

Computer-generated summit panorama

== Mining ==
Although the main part of Carrock Fell Mine is beneath Carrock Fell, there are some workings to the south of Grainsgill Beck at the base of Coomb Height. A trench runs northward down the slope to the beck, containing a number of shafts and levels. These surface workings follow the line of the Harding vein, the most productive part of the mine. Carrock Fell Mine was the only British tungsten mine outside Cornwall and was operated at various times between 1850 and 1982 when the price of tungsten was sufficient. Although reserves of wolframite and other tungsten ores are believed to remain, the Harding vein beneath Knott has long been worked out and the levels were used for dumping sludge from ore processing operations.

A small operation on the southern flank of Knott was Little Wiley Gill Mine. A 40-yard level was driven here, but no other information survives.

== Ascents ==
From Orthwaite to the north-west a track can be followed to the source of Hause Gill and the col between Knott and Great Calva. Alternatively a start can be made at Longlands, crossing the intervening ridge between Meal Fell and Great Cockup and then following a path up between Burn Tod and Frozen Fell.

Fell Side provides access from the north, along the old mine track beside Roughten Gill. Once the mine is reached a pathless climb can be made to the summit.

The access road to Carrock Fell Mine can be used to lead onto Coomb Height for an ascent from Mosedale. Wainwright gave dire warnings regarding the mine workings on this route.

== See also ==
- Knott family of lighthouse keepers
