= Great Cockup =

Mountain in the English Lake District

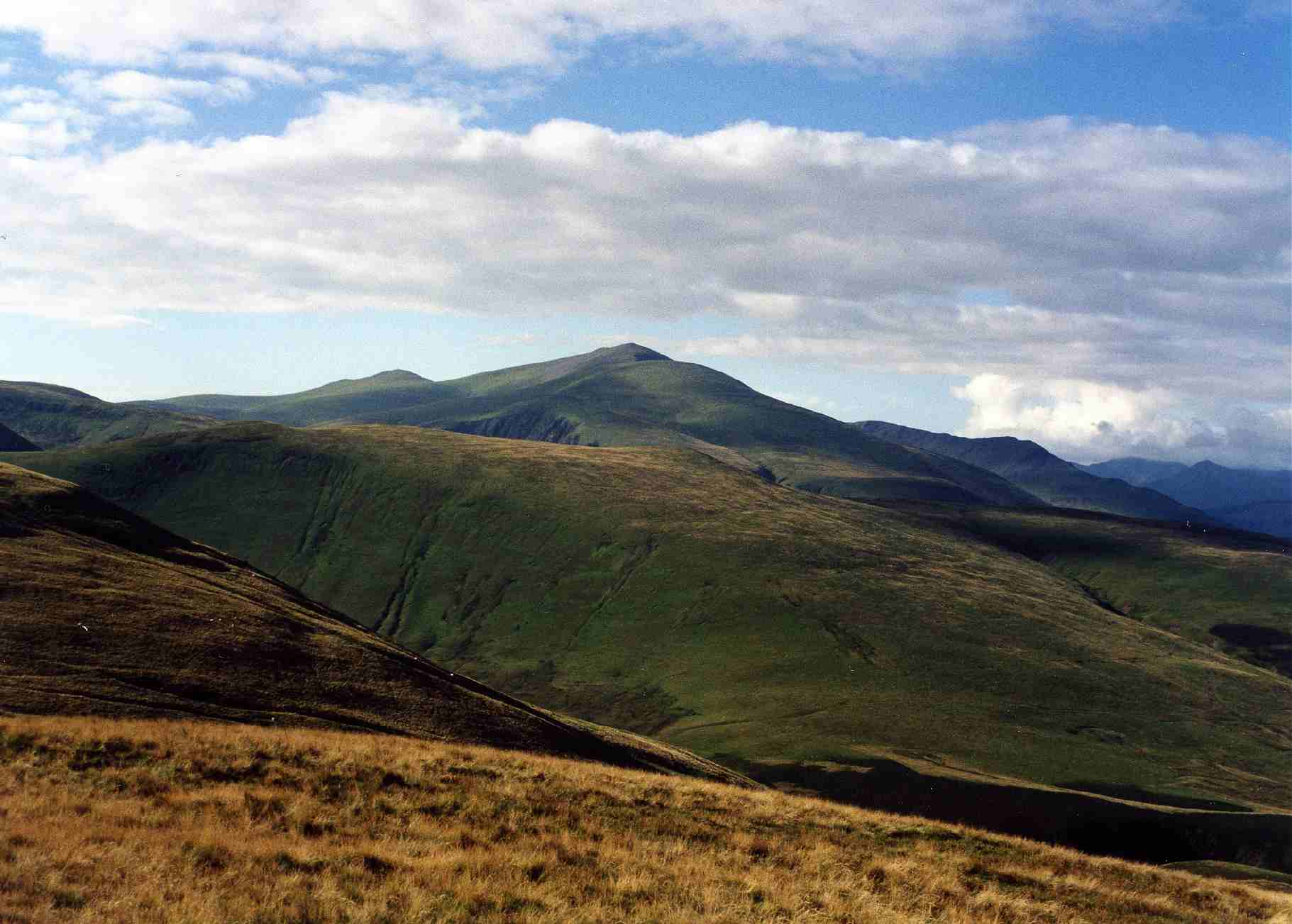
- Great Cockup seen from Longlands Fell with the bulk of Skiddaw behind.

Highest point
- Elevation: 526 m (1,726 ft)
- Prominence: c. 85 m (280 ft)
- Parent peak: Knott
- Listing: Wainwright
- Coordinates: 54°41′22″N 3°07′46″W

Geography
- Location within the Lake District Location within the former Allerdale Borough
- Location: Cumbria, England
- Parent range: Lake District, Northern Fells
- OS grid: NY273333
- Topo map: OS Landranger 89, 90 OS Explorer 4

Great Cockup is a fell in the northern region of the English Lake District, one of the four Uldale Fells (the others being Longlands Fell, Great Sca Fell and Meal Fell).

== Description ==
Great Cockup reaches a height of 526 metres (1,726 ft) and merits a chapter in Alfred Wainwright's Pictorial Guide to the Lakeland Fells. Wainwright describes the fell as functional rather than ornamental, writing:

"Viewed from a distance Great Cockup appears as a modest but extensive eminence with no obvious summit and nothing calling for closer inspection. First impressions are confirmed by a tour of exploration, the fell underfoot proving no more attractive than the fell at a distance."

== Etymology ==
The fell's name may mean "blind valley frequented by wild birds", from Old English cocc hop. If this is the case, it would originally have referred to a valley below before being transferred to the hill. The prefix "great" distinguishes the fell from its smaller neighbour Little Cockup, which lies on its north-western shoulder overlooking the hamlet of Orthwaite, with a height of 395 metres (1,296 ft).

The word "cockup" denotes a blunder in colloquial English; this prompted Denis Norden to visit the fell in an edition of It'll be Alright on the Night, a programme featuring outtakes from film and television. The fell's name has also been adopted for a local beer brewed by the Hesket Newmarket Brewery, "Great Cockup Porter".

== Topography ==
The fell has a series of stone-built grouse butts 500 metres (1,600 ft) west of the summit, some of which have been dismantled leaving just the foundations in the ground; they can confuse walkers as to their original purpose. The lower southern slope of the fell has a large, isolated boulder which is marked on large-scale maps; this is thought to be an erratic left by a retreating glacier. The fell has also yielded some rare fossils with unusual forms of dendroid graptolites being found on the slopes.

== Ascent ==
Great Cockup is almost always ascended from the hamlet of Orthwaite following the bridleway up Hause Gill for 2 kilometres (1.2 mi) and then leaving it and ascending Great Cockup's steep southern slopes to the summit. A direct ascent over Little Cockup is possible but the bracken can be thick at certain times of the year. Great Cockup is separated from Meal Fell, 1.5 kilometres (0.9 mi) to the east, by the pass of Trusmadoor.

== Summit ==
The view from the summit is dominated by a good view of Skiddaw's northern slopes while there is an excellent open outlook towards the Scottish Borders.

== In popular culture ==
On 12 October 1996 Denis Norden presented the TV show It'll Be Alright on the Night in episode 15 Alright on the Night's Cockup Trip. This decision was made as the name of the hill references the theme and content of It'll Be Alright on the Night, which is mistakes made in TV shows.

On 21 December 2020, YouTuber Tom Scott posted a video where he hiked Great Cockup whilst he gave a monologue to camera, in homage to the aforementioned TV show's title sequence which took place on the hill.
