= Dodd (Lake District) =

Mountain in the Lake District, England

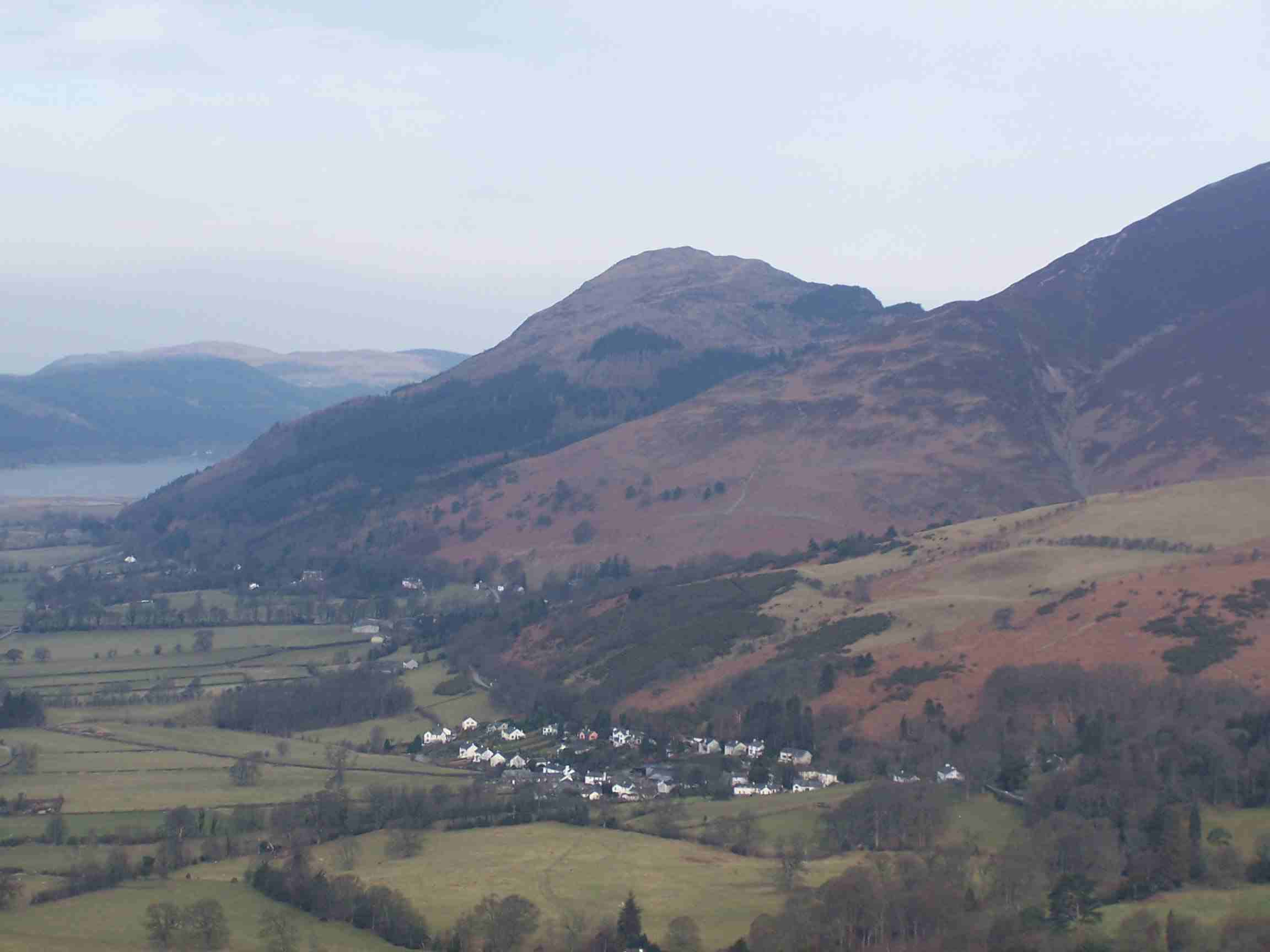
- Dodd seen from the south east; the village of Applethwaite sits in the valley

Highest point
- Elevation: 502 m (1,647 ft)
- Prominence: c. 120 metres (390 ft)
- Parent peak: Skiddaw
- Listing: Wainwright
- Coordinates: 54°38′06″N 3°10′12″W

Geography
- Location within the Lake District
- Location: Cumbria, England
- Parent range: Lake District, Northern Fells
- OS grid: NY244273
- Topo map: OS Landrangers 89, 90, Explorer OL4

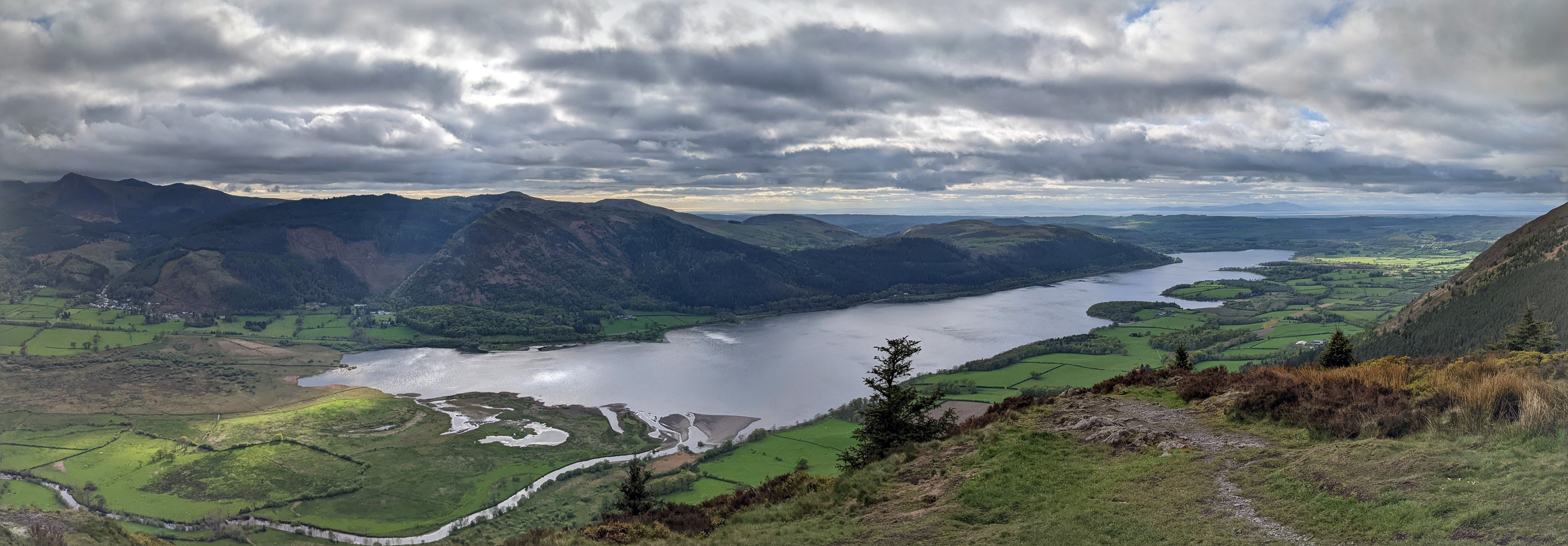
Bassenthwaite Lake from Dodd, with Barf, Lord's Seat and Sale Fell behind. Criffel, part of the hills of Galloway, is also visible beyond the Solway Firth

Dodd is a small fell in the Lake District, Cumbria, England, four kilometres north-west of Keswick. It forms part of the Skiddaw range in the northern part of the national park and the slopes are heavily wooded.

== Forestry ==
Dodd lies on Forestry England land known as Dodd Wood; for many years it was extensively planted with conifers right up to the summit which obstructed the view. However, Forestry England started a programme of tree clearance from the top of the fell in 2001 and the summit of the fell is now clear; it is hoped that it will revert to heather moorland in years to come. Influential guidebook author Alfred Wainwright voiced strong opposition to the afforestation of Dodd in his Pictorial Guides to the Lakeland Fells in 1962; it took 40 years for his wishes to come true.

== Height ==
The fell has a height of 502 metres (1,647 feet), though the Ordnance Survey's 1:50,000 Landranger series marks a spot height of 491 metres (1,611 ft). This height in fact refers to a point about 100 metres (330 ft) south of the true summit; on closer inspection a 500 m ring contour may be discerned at the summit.

== Geology ==
In common with much of the Northern Fells the Kirk Stile Formation of the Skiddaw Group predominates. This is composed of laminated mudstone and siltstone with greywacke sandstone and is of Ordovician age. There are minor intrusions of lamprophyre.

== Wildlife ==
In recent years Dodd and Dodd Wood have become a magnet for visitors as the area around the southern end of Bassenthwaite Lake is home to one of the only four pairs of nesting Ospreys in northern England, the other three being at Kielder Forest in Northumberland. An open-air viewing platform was opened on the slopes of Dodd in June 2001 which gives a clear view of the nest from a safe distance. Dodd Wood is one of the diminishing strongholds of the Red Squirrel in Great Britain and Forestry England, along with the Department for Environment, Food and Rural Affairs, have begun a campaign of protection from the Grey Squirrel.

== Ascents ==
Dodd is generally climbed from the car park at the Old Sawmill tea room (grid reference: NY235281) on the A591 road, opposite the Mirehouse; there is a waymarked route right up to the summit of the fell. It is possible to continue the walk from Dodd to take in the adjoining fell of Carl Side and then continue to the summit of Skiddaw, one of England's few 3,000-foot mountains.

== Summit ==
The top of the fell is marked by a stone memorial pillar with a brass plaque that says "In memory of John Lole and Ian Sandelands, Ist Seaton Scout Group" and later "in memory of Malcom 'Mac' Macdougall". The view from the top is excellent for a fell of modest height, encompassing the entirety of Bassenthwaite Lake and Derwent Water as well as the high mountains of Scafell Pike, Great Gable and Bowfell 21 kilometres (13 mi) away to the south; the hills of Dumfries and Galloway are also visible to the north-west. Computer-generated summit panorama

== Skiddaw Hermit ==
In the 1860s, Dodd was home to a Scottish hermit called George Smith, who became known as the Skiddaw Hermit. He lived on a ledge on the fell in a wigwam type tent made from a framework of branches and built against a low stone wall. He stayed there in all weathers because he liked the outdoor life. He earned money by painting portraits and doing character assessment at local fairs. A short book was written about him in 1996 called the "Skiddaw Hermit" by Mary E. Burkett.
