= Routenbeck =

Hamlet in Cumbria, England

Coordinates: 54.662°N 3.249°W

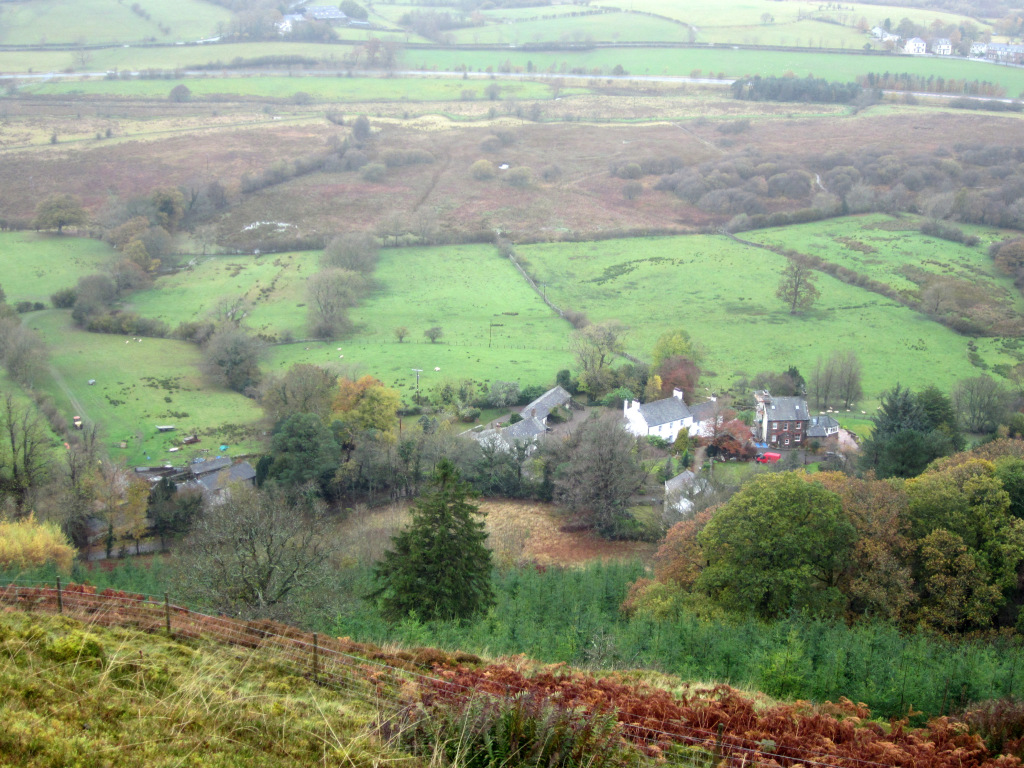
- Looking down to Routenbeck

- Location in Allerdale, Cumbria Location within Cumbria
- OS grid reference: NY194303
- Civil parish: Wythop
- Unitary authority: Cumberland
- Ceremonial county: Cumbria
- Region: North West
- Country: England
- Sovereign state: United Kingdom
- Post town: COCKERMOUTH
- Postcode district: CA13
- Dialling code: 017687
- Police: Cumbria
- Fire: Cumbria
- Ambulance: North West
- UK Parliament: Penrith and Solway

Routenbeck is a hamlet in Cumbria, England. It is located at the northern foot of Sale Fell, near the north-west edge of Bassenthwaite Lake. Routenbeck is just over 2 miles south-west of the village of Bassenthwaite and 5 miles east of the town of Cockermouth. It contains an Old Vicarage. The nearest pub is the Pheasant Inn, about a third of a mile along the road to the north-east.
