= Mirehouse =

Stately home in Cumbria, England

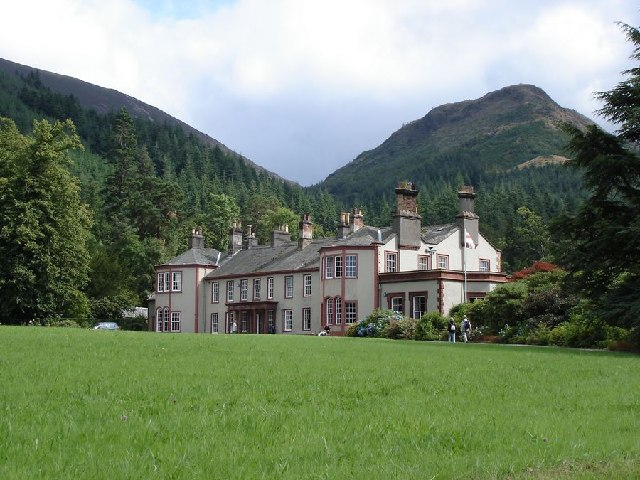
- Mirehouse

- Location within the former Allerdale Borough Location within Cumbria

General information
- Status: Grade II* listed
- Type: Stately home
- Location: Bassenthwaite, Cumbria, UK
- Coordinates: 54.6446°N 3.1916°W
- Construction started: 1666
- Owner: The Spedding Family

Website
- https://www.mirehouse.co.uk/

Mirehouse is a 17th-century house to the north of Keswick in Cumbria, at the foot of Dodd, near Bassenthwaite Lake and St Bega's Church, on the A591 road. Although still a family home it and its grounds are open to the public and in 1999 won the award for 'Best Heritage Property for Families in the UK'.

== History ==
Mirehouse was built in 1666 by Charles Stanley, 8th Earl of Derby, who sold it in 1688 to his agent, Roger Greg. The Greg family and then their descendants, the Storys owned the estate until 1802 when Thomas Story left it in his will to John Spedding.

The Spedding family, who still own the house, have enlarged the house several times, with the last major changes occurring in the 1960s, when extensive renovation work was carried out, and in the 1980s, when the ground floor and grounds were opened to the public. The grounds now include a bee garden, a wild flower meadow, a "poetry walk", squirrel island and adventure playgrounds.

The Spedding family had strong links to a number of poets, including Alfred, Lord Tennyson, Robert Southey, Edward FitzGerald and Thomas Carlyle. In celebration of these poetic links, an annual Poetry competition is now held.
