= Bassenfell Manor =

Manor house in Cumbria, England

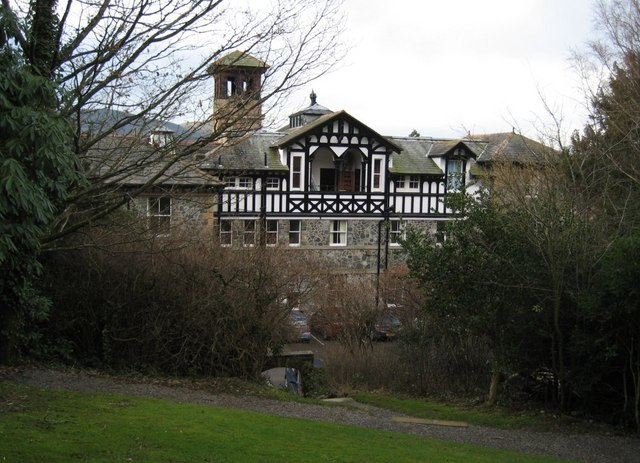
- Rear view of Bassenfell Manor

- Location within Cumbria

General information
- Location: Bassenthwaite, England
- Coordinates: 54.682926°N 3.214767°W

Bassenfell Manor is a manor house in Bassenthwaite, Cumbria, overlooking Bassenthwaite Lake in England's Lake District. It is used as a Christian residential centre hosting school groups, youth groups, church groups and holidays for individuals and families. It is in over 3 acres (12,000 m^{2}) of grounds and the manor has 19 bedrooms plus a self-catering apartment and two live-in apartments for management.

== History ==
The Manor was built in 1842 by William Rathbone VI, a Member of Parliament who made his wealth from shipping in Liverpool where a statue of him still resides in the campus of the University. The Rathbone family were devout Quakers, William Rathbone being a very close friend of Florence Nightingale who sent a message to his family following his death "England has lost one of its best son's". Basil Rathbone the actor (famous for his portrayal as Sherlock Holmes) was connected with Bassenfell and he probably spent some holidays at the manor, but never actually lived there.

Bassenfell Manor was built as a country residence for William Rathbone's family and took five years to build. The house has many nautical features; the wing containing bedrooms 1-5 looks like the bridge of a ship and the middle and top corridors as the decks. It is believed that the Tank room was originally the servants quarters and that what is now the staff linen room was used as the maternity room whenever children were born.

Since being sold by the Rathbone family around 1910, the Manor has served as a hotel, old people's home, and during the war a school for evacuees. It was purchased by the Christian Outdoor Pursuits Trust in August 1983 and was opened as a Christian centre at Easter, 1984.
