= Broom Fell =

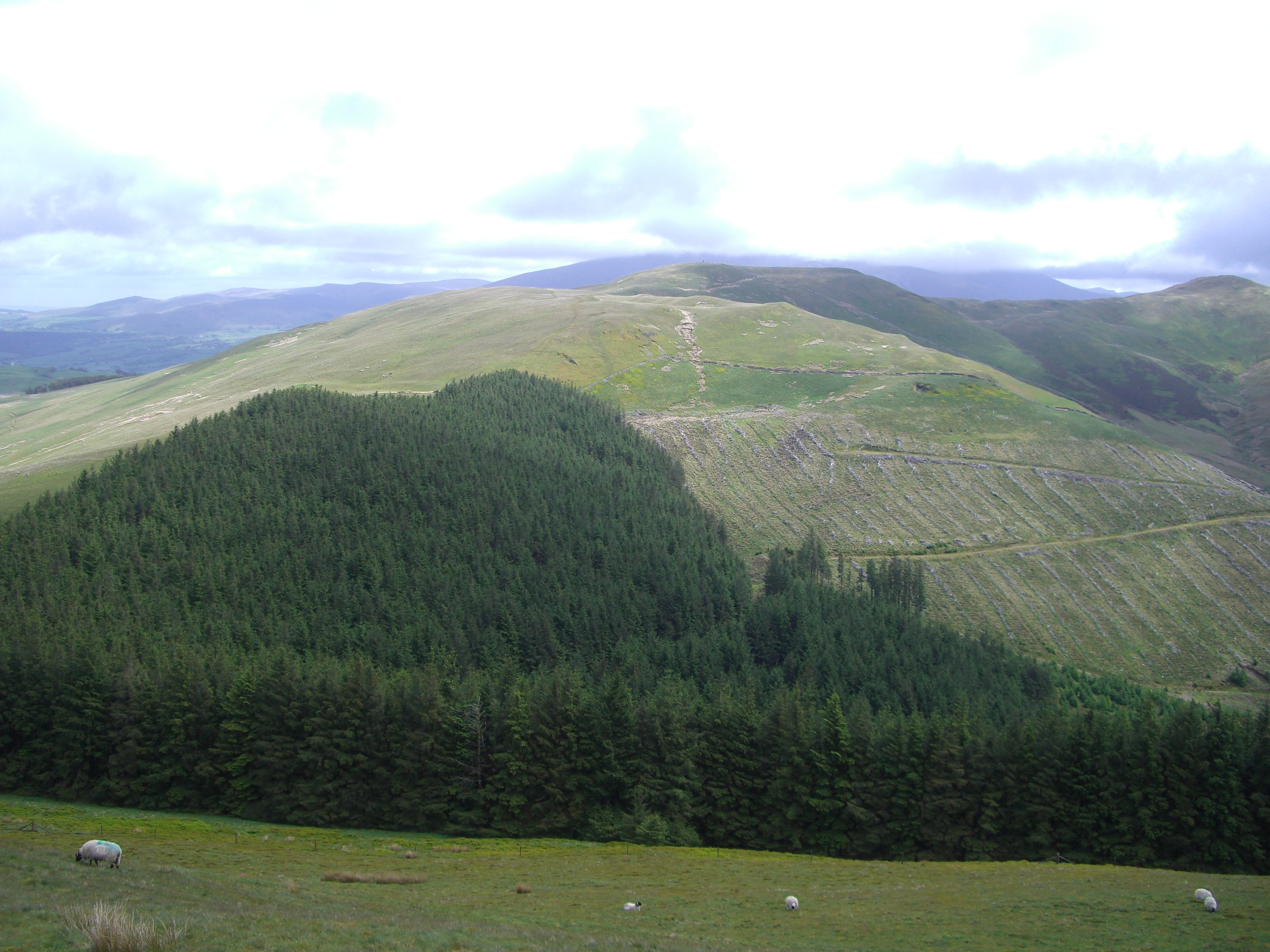
- Seen from Graystones, 2 km to the SE with Darling How Plantation in the foreground.

Highest point
- Elevation: 511 m (1,677 ft)
- Prominence: c. 25 m
- Parent peak: Lord's Seat
- Listing: Wainwright
- Coordinates: 54°37′52″N 3°14′53″W

Geography
- Location within the Lake District
- Location: Cumbria, England
- Parent range: Lake District, North Western Fells
- OS grid: NY195271
- Topo map: OS Landranger 89, 90, Explorer OL4

Broom Fell is a hill with the status of a Wainwright in the English Lake District. It lies on a ridge connecting Lord's Seat and Graystones. Alfred Wainwright provided its status as a separate fell in his influential guidebook series, the Pictorial Guide to the Lakeland Fells.

== Topography ==
The North Western Fells occupy the area between the rivers Derwent and Cocker, a broadly oval swathe of hilly country, elongated on a north–south axis. Two roads cross from east to west, dividing the fells into three convenient groups. The most northerly sector, rising between Whinlatter Pass and the Vale of Embleton, includes Broom Fell.

Lord's Seat, is the highest of the fells north of Whinlatter and sends out a long ridge westwards. The ridge begins with a marshy depression before rising to the summit of Broom Fell. It then continues west to the more pronounced saddle of Widow Hause, beyond which is Graystones. Widow Hause, is densely forested on the southern side with the conifers of the Darling How Plantation.

To the south of Broom Fell, is the pleasant valley of Aiken Beck, heavily wooded in its lower reaches. This secluded dale lies between the main ridge and Whinlatter Fell, draining to the west and ultimately reaching the Cocker. Hidden within the Darling How Plantation, is the fine waterfall of Spout Force.

On the northern flank of Broom Fell, is Burthwaite Heights (1,043 ft), listed as a separate top in some guidebooks. This is a small hill beside the vast morass of Wythop. Wythop Moss itself lies to the west and drains (slowly) via Tom Rudd Beck. To the east of Burthwaite Heights, runs the valley of Wythop Beck, emptying rather more effectively between the twin hills of Ling Fell and Sale Fell.

== Geology ==
The predominant rock is the Ordovician Kirk Stile Formation of the Skiddaw Group. This consists of laminated mudstone and siltstone. To the south of the summit are outcrops of greywacke sandstone.

== Summit ==
The top is grassy, and the summit is marked by the end of a wall coming up from Aiken Beck to the southwest. Since this wall connects to no others, and simply stops at the highest point, its purpose is unknown. A summit cairn of approximately 2m in height now exists on the summit as does a small wind shelter made from part of the wall.

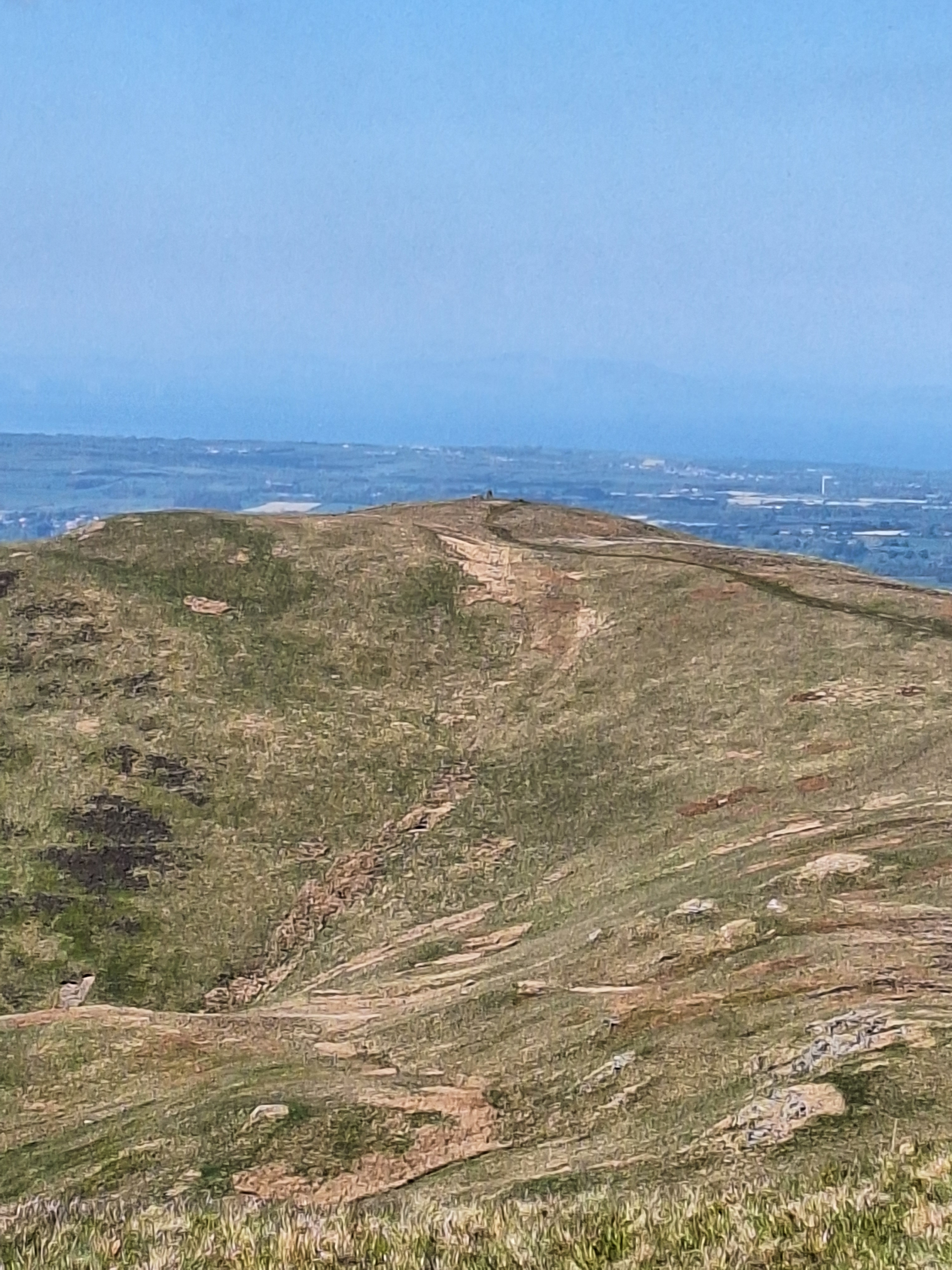
Broom Fell cairn looking from Lord's Seat. Note the Solway Firth and Scotland in the background are 42 km distant.

The view southward takes in the Whiteside-Grisedale Pike ridge and the Grasmoor fells showing behind. To the North-West, towards Cockermouth and Workington, the Solway Firth and beyond the peak of Criffel in Scotland are seen on clear days. To the East, Lord's Seat framed by the Skiddaw group of hills.

== Ascents ==
From Wythop Mill a crossing of Wythop Moss can be made, using the old path which gives drier footing. Once the marsh is passed an ascent up the northern slope of Widow Hause leads to the ridge.

The alternative is to make use of Aiken Beck, a car park being available near Scawgill Bridge on the Whinlatter Pass road. From the valley the southern slopes of Broom Fell can be tackled direct.

A 4.3 km route can be taken from the Whinlatter visitor center through Ullister Hill and Lord's Seat.
