= Ling Fell =

Hill in Britain

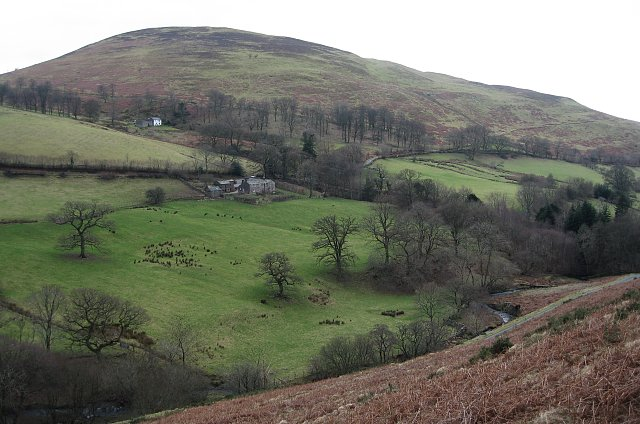
- Ling Fell from the slopes of Sale Fell

Highest point
- Elevation: 373 m (1,224 ft)
- Prominence: c. 97 m
- Parent peak: Lord's Seat
- Listing: Wainwright
- Coordinates: 54°38′42″N 3°16′26″W

Geography
- Location within the Lake District
- Location: Cumbria, England
- Parent range: Lake District, North Western Fells
- OS grid: NY179286
- Topo map: OS Landranger 89, 90, Explorer OL4

Ling Fell is a small hill in the north west of the Lake District in the United Kingdom. It is close to the village of Wythop Mill, from where it can easily be climbed. The fell is shaped like a wide dome, with no particular dangers. Its name derives from the fact that it is largely covered in heather, also known as "ling". The summit has good views of the town of Cockermouth.

== Topography ==
The North Western Fells occupy the area between the rivers Derwent and Cocker, a broadly oval swathe of hilly country, elongated on a north-south axis. Two roads cross from east to west, dividing the fells into three convenient groups. The most northerly sector, rising between Whinlatter Pass and the Vale of Embleton, includes Ling Fell.

Ling Fell and its near twin companion to the east, Sale Fell, are the final hills with any lakeland character in the north west of the district. Continuing northward across the Vale of Embleton is a final group of very low tops on either side of the Derwent Valley which are ignored by most guidebooks and hill lists.

Guidebook writer Alfred Wainwright devoted a chapter to Ling Fell in his influential Pictorial Guide to the Lakeland Fells. He described it as "an isolated rounded hill...its unattractive appearance on all sides being accentuated by a dark covering of heather that makes it look gloomy and sulky even on the sunniest of days."

To the south of Ling Fell is the morass of Wythop Moss, and beyond this is a ridge of fells running east to west. These are Lord's Seat, Broom Fell and Graystones and they block all drainage in this direction. The basin of Wythop Moss therefore empties slowly via Tom Rudd Beck around the western flanks of Ling Fell.

Ling Fell and Sale Fell, despite standing side by side, have no topographical connection. Ling Fell's 'parent' is Broom Fell, while Sale Fell is an outlier of Lord's Seat. They are separated by the stream of Wythop Beck which drains a catchment to the east. The two fells act as portals to this shy valley as it descends into the Vale of Embleton.

Ling Fell has no forestry, and the remains of grouse butts demonstrate its former use for country sports.

== Geology ==
The mound of Ling Fell is predominantly composed of Ordovician rocks of the Loweswater Formation. This consists of greywacke sandstone turbidities. The southern flanks are of the laminated mudstone and siltstone of the Kirk Stile Formation. There is also a small intrusion of dolerite on the northern side.

== Summit ==
The summit of the fell is smooth and rounded, the highest point marked by an Ordnance Survey triangulation column. The view southwards is cut off by the higher Broom Fell, although the Skiddaw and Grasmoor fells are well seen. The best of the panorama is northwards to the Solway Firth and the hills of Galloway in Scotland.

== Ascents ==
The village of Wythop Mill is nearby to the north. From here the road can be followed up the narrow wooded valley between Ling and Sale Fell. Half a mile up, a good path breaks right onto the slopes of Ling Fell. After taking a contouring course around the northern flanks of the fell a direct line can be taken to the summit.
