= Saint Bega =

Medieval Irish saint

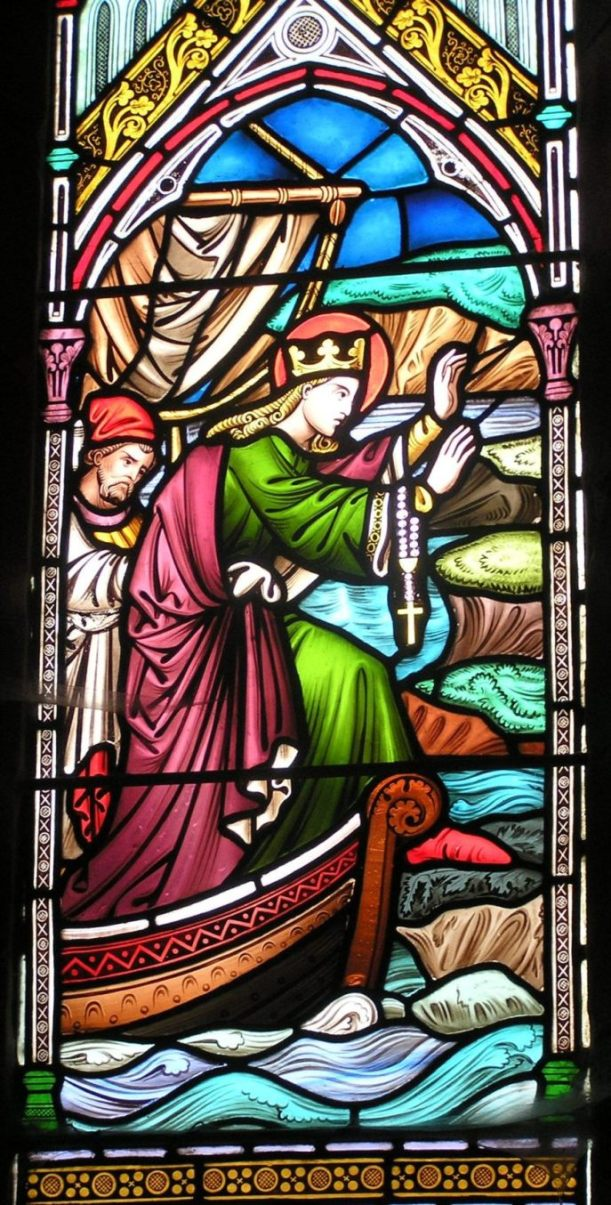
- Stained glass window in St Bees Priory showing the arrival of St Bega on the coast.
- Born: Ireland
- Died: Northumbria
- Venerated in: Anglican Communion; Roman Catholic Church; Eastern Orthodox Church
- Major shrine: St Bees Priory, Cumbria
- Feast: 31 October (Aberdeen Breviary); 7 November (in St Bees); 6 September in Catholic Church
- Attributes: virginity, bracelet
- Major works: "Oracio ad Sanctam Begam"

Bega is a medieval Irish saint of Northumbria, venerated primarily in the town of St Bees. According to her Life, she was an Irish princess who fled to Northumbria to escape an arranged marriage to a Viking prince. She became an anchoress and was renowned for her piety. Multiple churches have been dedicated to her in England, and her feast day is still celebrated in St Bees.

== Biography ==
Bega was reputedly an early medieval Irish princess who became an anchoress and valued her virginity. Promised in marriage to a Viking prince who, according to a medieval manuscript The Life of St Bega, was "son of the king of Norway", Bega "fled across the Irish sea to land at St. Bees on the Cumbrian coast. There she settled for a time, leading a life of exemplary piety, then, fearing the raids of pirates which were starting along the coast, she moved over to Northumbria". The most likely time for this would have been after AD 850 when the Vikings were settling in Ireland.

The account of Bega's flight from Ireland is found in the Life of St Bega, (Tomlinson in his translation 'inserts phrases and indeed whole sentences of his own devising, without any warning' and therefore should be avoided) part of a collection of various English saints' lives that belonged to Holmcultram Abbey in Abbeytown, Cumbria, and is dated to the mid-13th century. The rest of her biography, according to her Life, is summarised by the Victoria County History as follows:

Bega found the place covered with a thick forest, admirably adapted for a solitary life. Wishing to dedicate her life to God she built for herself a virgin cell in a grove near the seashore, where she remained for many years in strict seclusion. In the course of time the district began to be frequented by pirates. The good saint however dreaded not death, nor mutilation, nor the loss of temporal goods, of which she was destitute except her bracelet (armilla), but she feared the loss of her virginity, the most precious treasure with which heaven can endow her sex. By divine command Bega hastened her departure from the place, but she was induced to leave her bracelet behind her, that miracles in ages to come might be performed in that neighbourhood in testimony of her holy life.

— Victoria County History, Cumberland, ed. J. Wilson

The account has Bega living in seclusion, and after a time travelling to Northumbria, where she was admitted to sacred vows. It also states that she founded Hartlepool Abbey, but modern historians believe the writer of the Life created a composite St Bega, with events from the lives of Heui, who founded that convent, and Begu; who was mentioned in Bede's life of St Hilda of Whitby. This confusion put Bega into the 7th century, which is clearly inconsistent, as the Vikings, whose raids supposedly led to her fleeing to St Bees, only appeared in the area and started raiding Ireland from ca.795 onwards.

=== Miracles ===
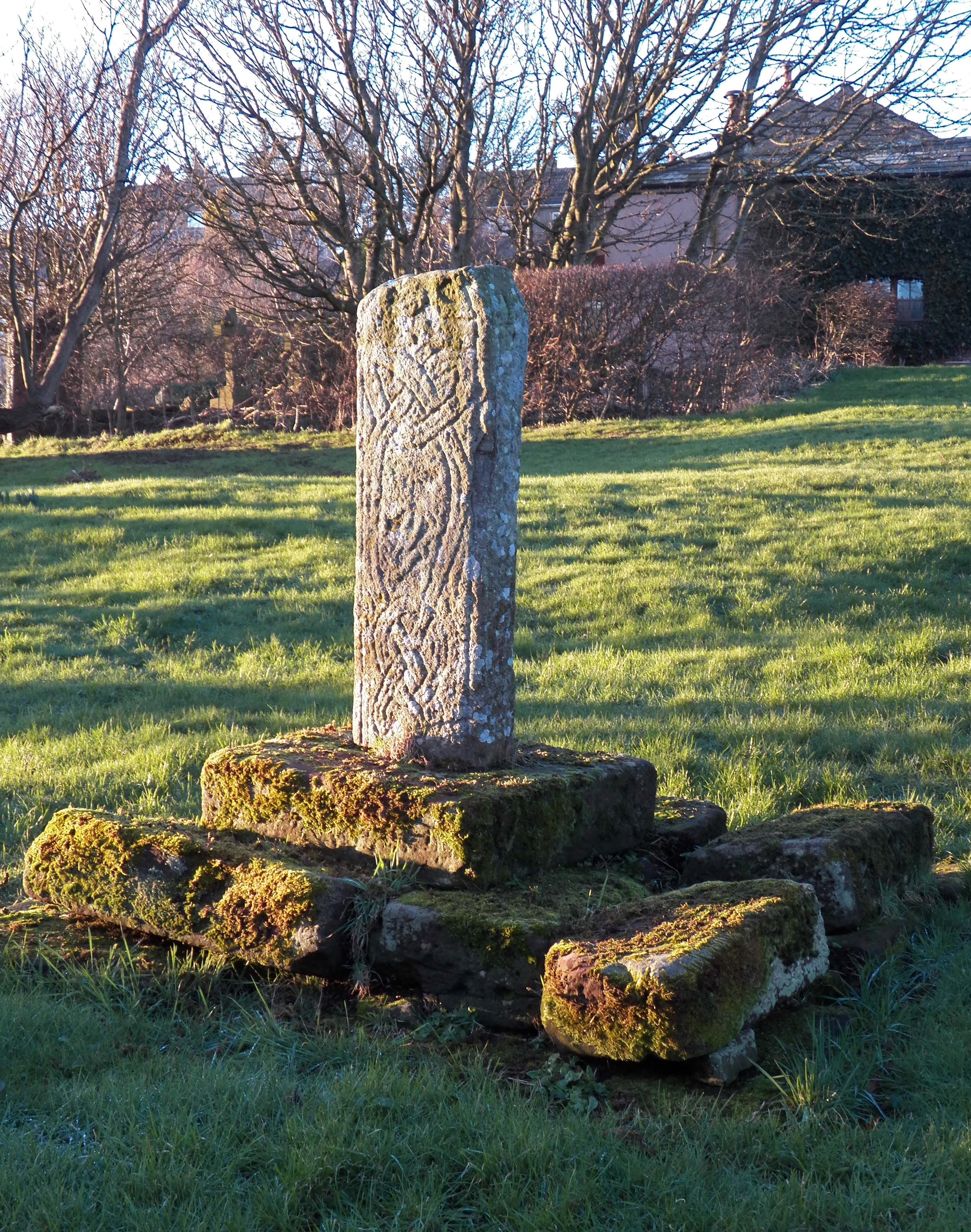
The 10th-century cross at St Bees Priory, indicating a pre-Norman religious site.

Bega is associated in legend with a number of miracles, the most famous being the "Snow miracle", which is described in the Life of St Bega thus:

"Ranulf le Meschin (sic) had endowed the monastery with its lands, but a lawsuit later developed about their extent. The monks feared a miscarriage of justice. The day appointed for a perambulation of the boundaries arrived – and, lo and behold, there was a thick snowfall on all the surrounding lands but not a flake upon the lands of the priory."

This version describes it as happening long after her death and concerns the monks of the Norman Priory.

A version of the snow miracle is also found in the Sandford manuscript; it was written in English after the dissolution of the Benedictine priory in 1539, and was formerly in the Dean and Chapter archives at Carlisle Cathedral. This garbled account is a less probable version than that in the Life, and sets the miracle in the days of St Bega herself.

The Life manuscript contains accounts of nine miracles brought about by the influence of St Bega. The first concerns a raider from Galloway in Scotland, who set out to steal a horse. His mother warned him against theft on the land of St Bega, but her son was scornful and moving his hands to the private parts of his buttocks he tauntingly said, "What can that little old woman do to me?" As he escaped on the horse, arrows were shot after him as he crouched low, and the inevitable happened. The third concerns Godard of Millom, whose men would not remove their horses from the monks' pasture to which they had strayed. When the men came to saddle the horses, they found the hooves almost severed, and in penance, Godard gave the field to the Monks. The seventh miracle tells of three men of Workington, who were imprisoned in Egremont Castle for killing a man in a drunken brawl, but having confessed their sins to St Bega, were rescued by her and found sanctuary at St Bees. The ninth miracle tells of two sick brothers who, after seeing a vision at Tynemouth, travelled to St Bees in a cart, and were healed; leaving the cart as thanks.

The register of St Bees Priory records several miracles by the power of prayer to St Bega. In 1310 "God worked many miracles by the prayers and merits of St Bega...to the edification of all the people with many eye-witnesses". In 1313, "A certain Irish boy received his sight in the chapel of St Bega through the merits and prayers of the said virgin, all the community seeing it".

=== Modern scholarship ===
Present-day scholarship tends to treat Bega not as a historical personage but as a cult. Philip Carter states: "The discovery of inconsistencies between these medieval texts, coupled with the significance attached to her jewellery (said to have been left in Cumbria on her departure for the north-east), now indicate that the abbess never existed. ... More plausible is the suggestion that St Bega was the personification of a Cumbrian cult centred on 'her' bracelet (Old English: beag)".

The 1999 edition of the Dictionary of National Biography includes an article (by Professor Robert Bartlett) that treats St Bega as a mythical figure. A 1980 paper by John Todd offers a comprehensive review of the historical references to that date, including a discussion of her existence.

The 16th-century historian John Leland seems to have been responsible for starting the "convent" legend by reference to a "humble little monastery". Unfortunately some 19th-century local historians unquestioningly accepted the pre-Viking era date given in the Life, and presumably prompted by Leland, they embellished the tale with the founding of a convent. In the words of John Todd writing in 1980, "Local historians in the last century had no doubt about the answer. She was an Irish saint who crossed the sea about 650 to found a convent at St Bees, which was destroyed in the Viking invasion. But there is no evidence in the Life or elsewhere that Bega's life at St Bees was other than solitary". The dubious 7th-century date and the convent are perpetuated today in many guidebooks, including the pages of Nikolaus Pevsner.

== Legacy ==
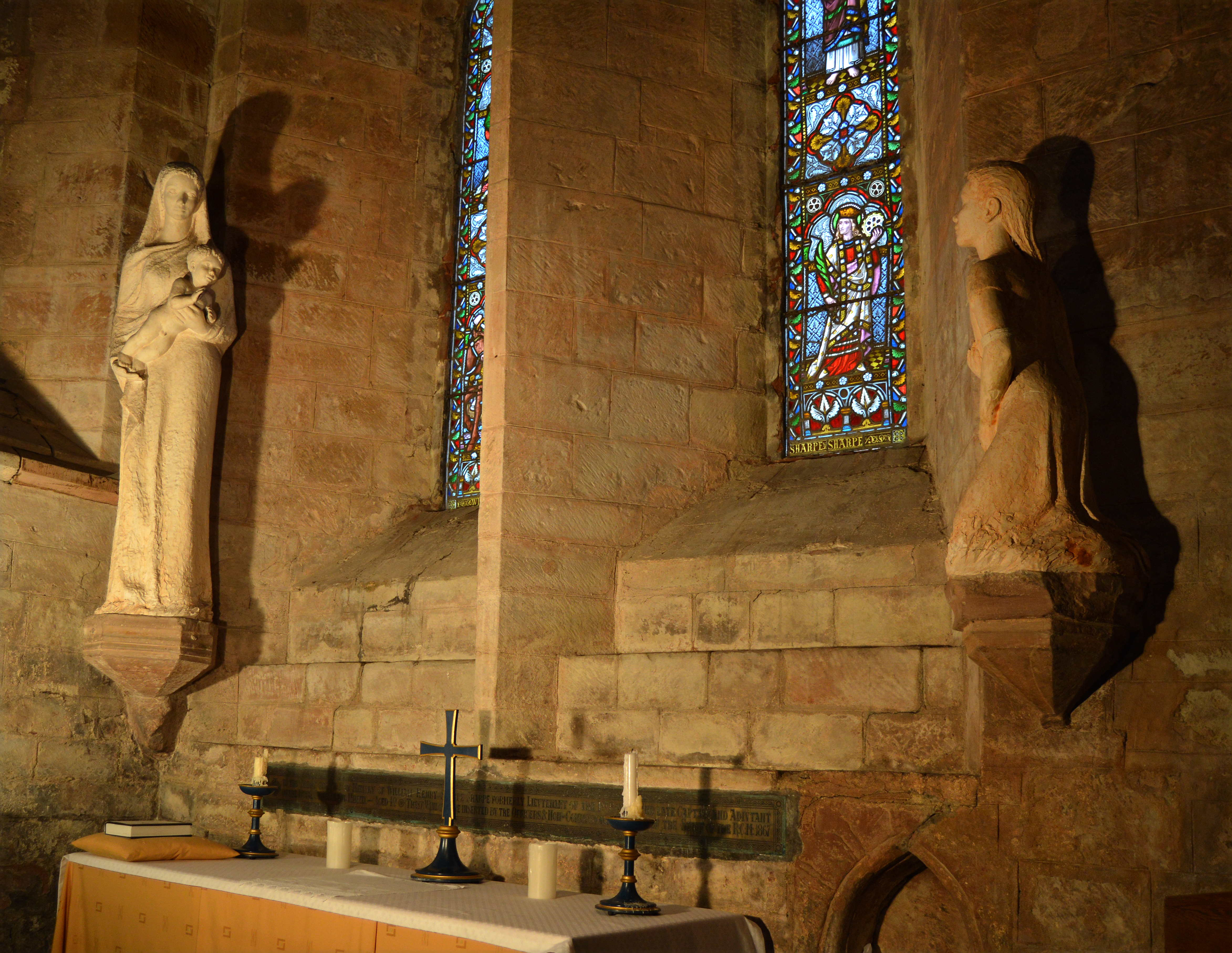
The "Vision of St. Bega", St Bees Priory, by Josefina de Vasconcellos

The name of the village Kirkeby Becok used in the charters of St Bees Priory from the times of Henry II and Richard I, and the phraseology of the early charters indicates a pre-Norman church at St Bees dedicated to St Bega.

At the granting of the first charter of the Benedictine priory, one of the witnesses was Gillebecoc; meaning devotee of Beghoc, indicating a cult dedicated to Bega was already in existence. The writer of the Life relates that St Bega was given a bracelet in Ireland by a heavenly being, which she left behind in St Bees when she travelled to Northumberland. It was described as having a holy cross upon it, which fits a style of the 9th and 10th centuries. The bracelet is mentioned several times in the charters of St Bees Priory; one instance is in the middle of the 13th century, when an oath was taken by John of Hale "having touched the sacred things ... and upon the bracelet of St Bega". An account roll from as late as 1516/1517 records offerings of 67s. 9d to the bracelet of St Bega; so the cult and the relic were still a going concern at that late time.

=== Veneration ===
The parish church of Bassenthwaite, Cumbria is dedicated to St Bega. It was built around 950AD and is still used for regular services and weddings; it is a grade II* listed building.

The Roman Catholic church of St Begh in Whitehaven, near St Bees, is dedicated to St Bega. Bega is recognized as a saint by the Catholic Church in the latest calendar of saints, the 2004 Martyrologium Romanum, and is celebrated on September 6.

An Eastern Orthodox parish dedicated to Saints Bega, Mungo, and Herbert worships at the former Methodist chapel in Braithwaite.

==== St Bega's Day ====
In about 1400 it was recorded that St Bega's day was celebrated 'in albs' (for a lesser saint) at the mother house of St Mary's Abbey, York. A fifteenth-century Book of Hours in the Bodleian Library from St Mary's records the day as 7 November. Since this discovery in the late 20th century, St Bega's day has been celebrated in St Bees on this date.

==== Hymn to St Bega ====
The Latin Hymn to St Bega was discovered in the late 20th century in the 15th-century book of hours mentioned above. It would undoubtedly have been sung on St Bega's day, and the full text is printed in John Todd's article reproduced on the St Bees website. The Hymn received its first modern performance on St Bega's Day 1981 at St Bees Priory, using an original composition for orchestra, change ringing tower bells and choir by Hugh Turpin.

== Modern interpretations ==
Melvyn Bragg wrote the long historical novel Credo, with St Bega as the central character. He telescoped the events and dates of several centuries into the lifespan of the saint. However, this is freely admitted as an artistic device; unlike the medieval writer of the Life. The work re-awakened interest in St Bega.

In 2000, local author Jill Hudson was commissioned by St Bees Priory PCC to write a play about St Bega to celebrate the Millennium. This play, 'The Bracelet of St Bega', was staged in the Priory for three nights in November 2000. A fresh adaptation by Gus Kennedy was similarly staged in the Priory in November 2010 in the week of the feast of St Bega.

Lorna Goodison wrote a poem Across the fields to St Begas, which was reprinted in The Guardian.

Folklore author, psychogeographer and esoteric explorer Alex Langstone has written about St Bega in his controversial psychic questing book Spirit Chaser: The Quest for Bega, which includes parts of her legendary life and connections to Bassenthwaite and St Bees in Cumbria.

== See also ==
- St Bega's Way, a walking trail named after the saint
