= Whinlatter =

Fell in the English Lake District

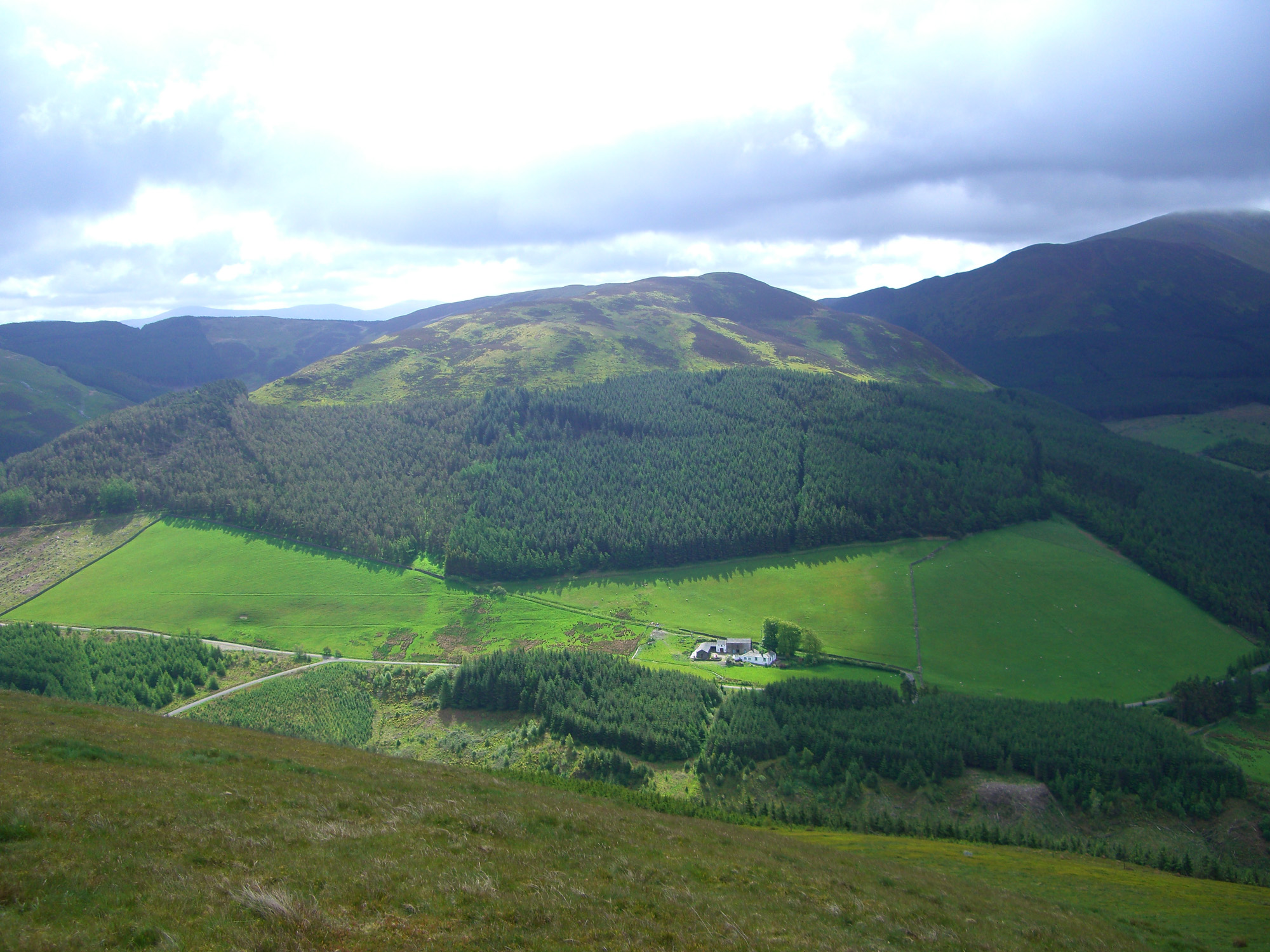
- Whinlatter seen from Graystones, 3 km (1.9 mi) to the northwest

Highest point
- Elevation: 525 m (1,722 ft)
- Prominence: c. 60 m
- Parent peak: Lord's Seat
- Listing: Wainwright,
- Coordinates: 54°36′50″N 3°15′07″W

Geography
- Location within the Lake District
- Location: Cumbria, England
- Parent range: Lake District, North Western Fells
- OS grid: NY197249
- Topo map: OS Landranger 89, 90, Explorer OL4

Whinlatter is a small fell in the north west of the English Lake District, just north of the Whinlatter Pass. It is easily climbed from the top of the Whinlatter Pass, through the Forestry England plantations. The Whinlatter Visitor's Centre, a popular tourist attraction, is on the south side of the fell. The hill is part of a horseshoe around the valley of Aiken Beck. The fell's name originates from a combination of the Old Norse and Gaelic languages. With the Old Norse word 'hvin' meaning gorse or furze, and the Gaelic word 'lettir' meaning slope, the name translates as "The Gorse or furze-covered slope".

== Topography ==
The North Western Fells occupy the area between the rivers Derwent and Cocker, a broadly oval swathe of hilly country, elongated on a north–south axis. Two roads cross from east to west, dividing the fells into three convenient groups. Whinlatter is in the most northerly sector, rising between Whinlatter Pass and the Vale of Embleton.

The hub of this group of fells is Lord's Seat, the highest point north of Whinlatter Pass. The main line of high ground runs east to west, taking in Barf, Lord's Seat, Broom Fell and Graystones, before petering out in the direction of Cockermouth. Lord's Seat however sends out a substantial additional ridge which starts southward, curves west and finally turns back north. This is Whinlatter, and the valley enclosed between it and the main ridge is that of Aiken Beck.

The descending ridge from Lord's Seat has a number of tops along its length. First is Ullister Hill at 1,722 ft (525 m), which is normally reckoned part of the parent fell. The ridge then narrows at Tarbarrel Moss at 1,617 ft (493 m), before rising again as it turns westward to arrive at Whinlatter Top, the summit. A final top, Brown How at 1,696 ft (517 m), stands above the terminal descent to Aiken Beck.

From Ullister Hill to Tarbarrel Moss the ridge line and both flanks fall within Thornthwaite Forest. All sides of the lower slopes of Brown How also form part of the Forestry England holdings. Depending on the stage in the planting cycle, large parts of the fellside will therefore be clad in conifers at any one time. Access problems have now been resolved and the landowner welcomes walkers, with many marked trails being available through the woodland.

The southern boundary of the fell is formed by the Whinlatter Pass road. The summit of the pass lies south east of Whinlatter Top, marking the line of the Derwent-Cocker watershed. This falls from Tarbarrel Moss to the road, bypassing the highest point of the fell so that all of its waters flow to the Cocker. From the road summit, Whinlatter Beck runs westward beneath the steepest face of the fell; Whinlatter Crag being a little below the highest point. To the north of Whinlatter is the quiet valley of Aiken Beck, its entrance neatly hidden in the woods between Brown How and Graystones. Its tributaries Willybrag Gill and Drycloff Gill drain the slopes of the fell. One wonders at the derivation of the former name. Aiken Beck and Whinlatter Gill combine to form Blaze Beck, a sizeable stream flowing into the Cocker at Low Lorton.

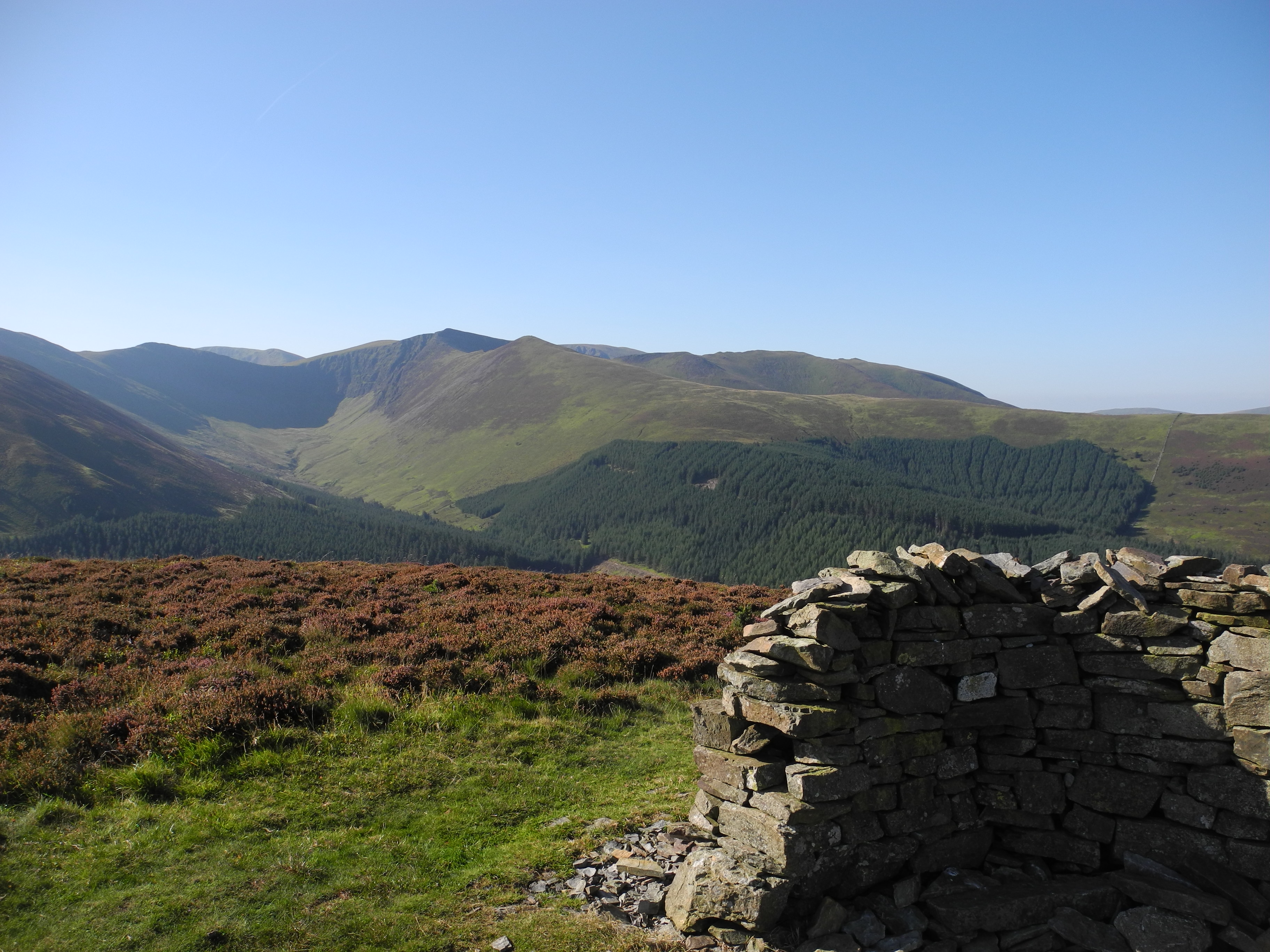
The view South from Brown How towards Hopegill Head.

== Position of summit ==
Alfred Wainwright in his influential Pictorial Guide to the Lakeland Fells noted that Ordnance Survey maps of his time showed Brown How to be the summit, a statement he discussed at some length and proved to be incorrect by his own amateur surveying. Modern maps of the Ordnance Survey appear to have conceded the point.

== Geology ==
In the summit areas of Whinlatter are rocks of the Loweswater Formation. This is composed of Greywacke sandstone turbidities.

== Summit ==
Brown How bears a large circular hide or windshelter, whilst Whinlatter Top itself has only a modest cairn. The Lake District views are poor, except for the close-ups of Hopegill Head and Grisedale Pike across the pass. Through Whinlatter Pass there is also a sight of the Helvellyn range and Skiddaw group. This is made up for by the northward views to the Solway Firth and the Scottish mountains beyond, best viewed from the westerly peak, Brown How.

== Ascents ==
The easiest line is direct from the top of the pass, either up the side of the forest fence or snaking through the woodland along the forest roads. Brown How can be reached from Aiken, allowing a start from Scawgill Bridge on the western side of the pass. The full circuit of Aiken Beck, taking in Graystones, Broom Fell, Lord's Seat and Whinlatter is also a possibility.
