= Lord's Seat =

Hill in United Kingdom

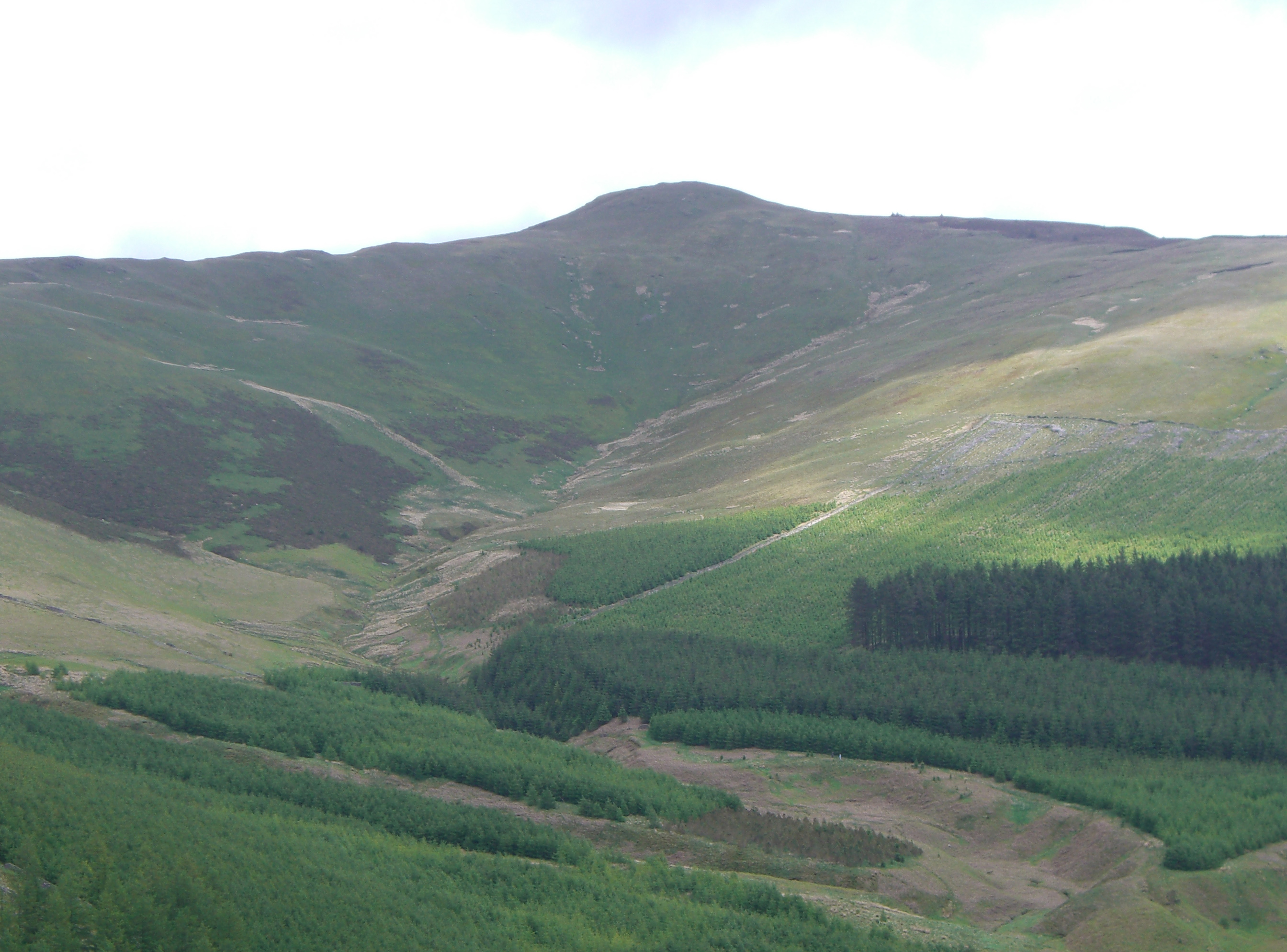
- Seen from Darling How Plantation, 2 km to the west.

Highest point
- Elevation: 552 m (1,811 ft)
- Prominence: 237 m (778 ft)
- Parent peak: Grasmoor
- Listing: Wainwright, Marilyn
- Coordinates: 54°37′37″N 3°14′06″W

Geography
- Location within the Lake District
- Location: Cumbria, England
- Parent range: Lake District, North Western Fells
- OS grid: NY204265
- Topo map: OS Landranger 89, 90, Explorer OL4

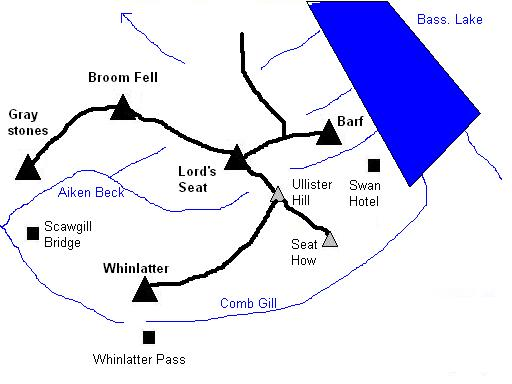
sketch map of Lord's Seat

Lord's Seat is a fell in the English Lake District. It is the highest of the group of hills north of Whinlatter Pass in the North Western Fells. The slopes of Lord's Seat are extensively forested.

== Topography ==
The North Western Fells occupy the area between the rivers Derwent and Cocker, a broadly oval swathe of hilly country, elongated on a north-south axis. Two roads cross from east to west, dividing the fells into three convenient groups. Lord's Seat is the hub of the most northerly sector, rising between Whinlatter Pass and the Vale of Embleton.

The principal feature of these fells is a ridge running from the Vale of Lorton in the west to Bassenthwaite Lake in the east. Travelling in this direction the main tops are Graystones, Broom Fell, Lord's Seat and Barf. Barf is in truth a satellite of Lord's Seat but was given the status of a separate fell by Alfred Wainwright in his influential Pictorial Guide to the Lakeland Fells

Lord's Seat is the focal point of the group and sends out a number of additional ridges. To the south east is Ullister Hill, 1,722 ft (525 m), a bare mound surrounded by conifer plantations. Further on in the same direction is Seat How, 1,627 ft (496 m), a rocky top standing above the steep descent to Comb Beck and the Whinlatter Pass road. A second branch of the ridge curves around south and then west from Ullister Hill, terminating in Whinlatter fell. Between Whinlatter and the main east-west ridge is the quiet valley of Aiken Beck.

North eastward from Lord's Seat, branching off from the ridge connection to Barf, is a long and sometimes imperceptible watershed which runs up the shore of Bassenthwaite. This divides the catchments of Wythop Beck (flowing north west) and Beck Wythop, a short stream running directly east into the lake. Some way to the north, this line of higher ground ends at Sale Fell.

Lord's Seat gives birth to a number of streams which, although departing in different directions, all ultimately join the River Derwent. Aiken Beck and its many tributaries drain the south western flanks, most of which are clad in conifers. Hagg Beck, the main feeder of Beck Wythop, begins a little to the north of the summit. This runs across open fellside at first, only entering the trees at around the 1,100 ft (340 m) contour. Beckstones Gill flows to Bassenthwaite to the south of Barf, while an unnamed stream does the same to the north. All of the eastern flanks of the range are forested, except for the scree-ridden face of Barf between these two watercourses.

== Geology ==
The predominant surface rocks are the Kirk Stile Formation, composed of laminated mudstone and siltstone. Much of the summit is overlain with peat and there is a fault to the south west, beyond which are greywacke sandstone turbidities of the Loweswater Formation.

There is evidence of historic mining activity on the eastern slopes, particularly below Seat How. Four mines operated in this area:- Ladstock, Rachel Wood, Thornthwaite and Beckstones. Most were abandoned in the 1870s but Thornthwaite and Rachel Wood operated until December 1920. The main yields were lead and zinc ores, in particular galena, blende, cerussite and gossan.

== Summit ==
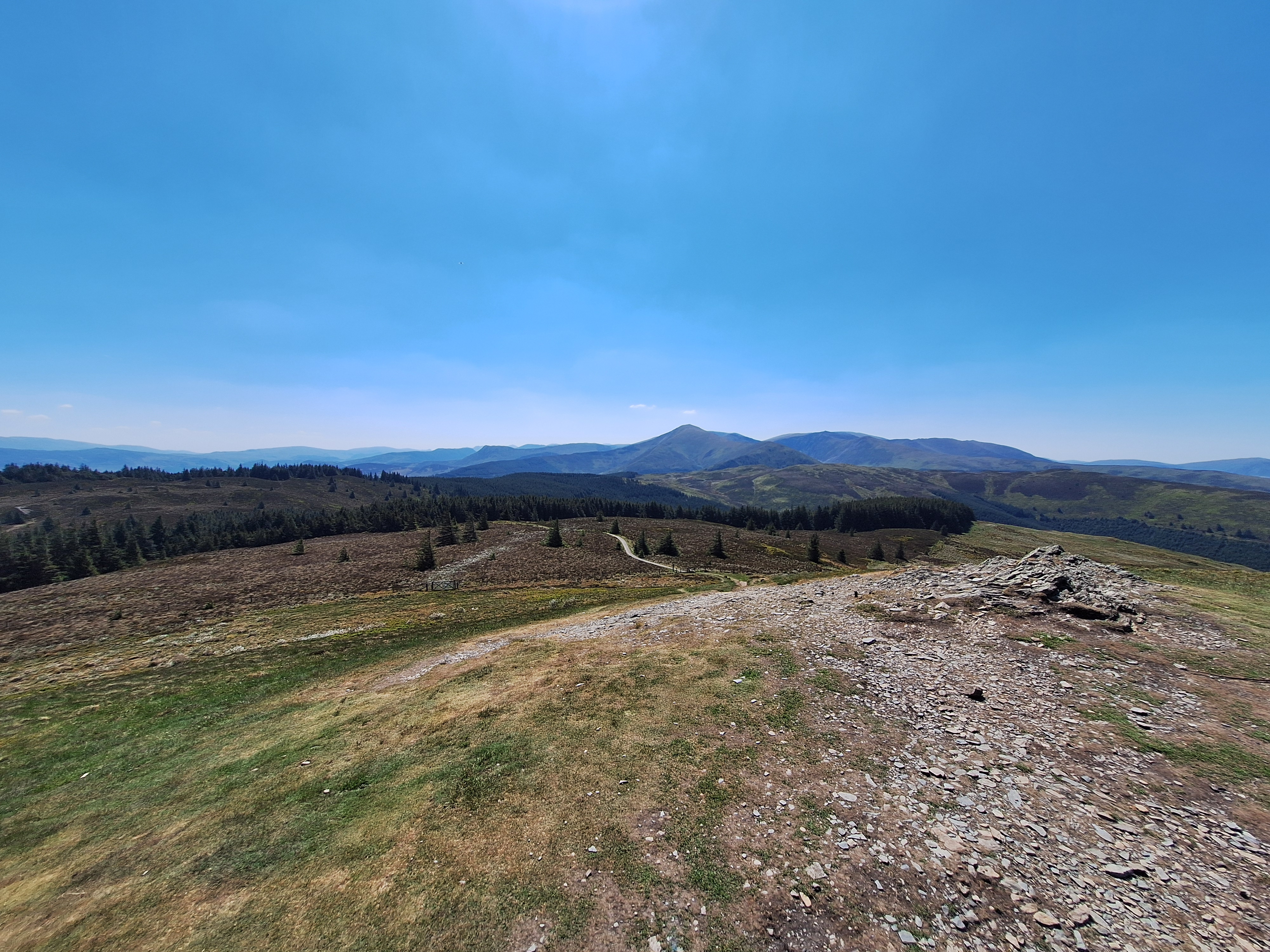
Lord's Seat toward Grisedale Pike (791). Beneath the skyline, in the mid ground, Whinlatter top (525) and Brown How (517). Access to the Forestry Commission plantations is via the visible stile .

The top of Lord's Seat is a dome with exposed rock and no cairn. The clipped iron fence stubs suggest previous structures have been scavenged for iron, or simply removed.

The view is extensive, befitting the highest point north of Whinlatter. The Northern Fells are well displayed over Bassenthwaite and there is also a good view of the Helvellyn range. Grasmoor and its supporters restrict the southward panorama, but there is no such obstruction to the north-west, Criffel being visible across the Solway Firth in good visibility.

== Ascents ==
From the western side of Whinlatter Pass a pleasant approach can be made up the wooded Aiken Valley, a quiet dale with no vehicular access. The summit of the pass also provides access, either direct via Ullister Hill, or by first climbing Whinlatter and then following the ridge. From the main road along the shore of Bassenthwaite a path can be followed beside Beckstones Gill, climbing just inside the forest. This is an easier alternative to the rough face of Barf.

A popular tourist route begins at the Whinlatter visitor centre with parking available for a fee. This route begins at 330 metres in elevation, and proceeds north using marked trails for 3 kilometres, reducing the total climb to about 220 metres.
