= St Bega's Way =

Walking trailing West Cumbria

- Length: 36 mi (58 km)
- Location: Lake District/Cumbria
- Trailheads: St Bees Priory; St Bega's Church *54.679581°N 3.195577°W Bassenthwaite
- Use: Hiking

St Bega's Way is a 36-mile (58 km) walk through rural West Cumbria and the north west corner of the English Lake District. It is usually completed as a leisure walk over 3 days, but has also been used as the basis of a single day competitive Ultramarathon.

== Background ==
The route: St Bees Priory *54.493777°N 3.593461°W - Ennerdale Bridge - Borrowdale - Derwentwater - St Bega's Church *54.679581°N 3.195577°W Bassenthwaite.

It is usual to walk in the easterly direction, given with the prevailing wind on the back. However, when running, it is frequently done in the opposite, westerly, direction.

Although the route is named after St Bega it is entirely the invention of Rosalinde Downing, who described it in a small booklet. Several commercial organisations offer guided or assisted vacations based on the walk.
