= St Begh's Church, Whitehaven =

St Begh's Church
- St Begh's Priory Church
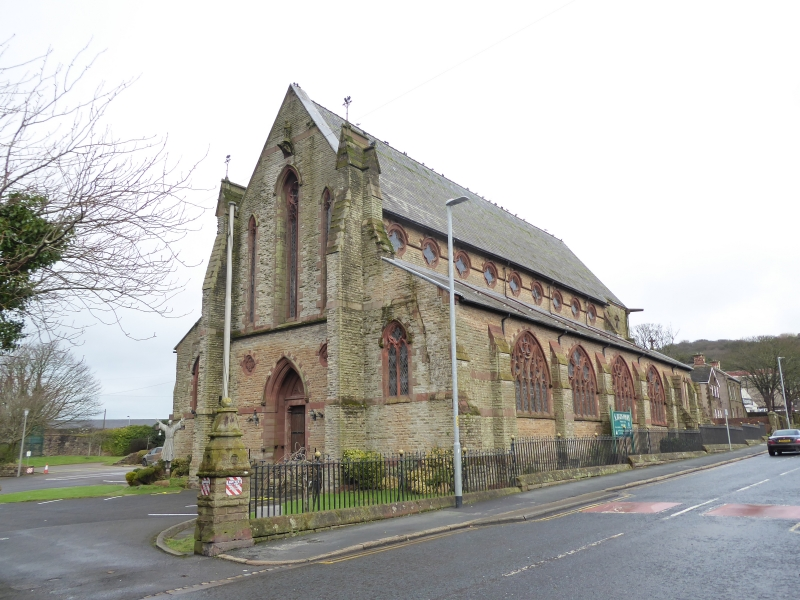
- St Begh's Church
- 54.5428°N 3.5843°W
- OS grid reference: NX 97607 17545
- Location: Whitehaven
- Country: England
- Denomination: Roman Catholic
- Website: StBeghsChurch.co.uk

History
- Status: Parish church
- Founded: 1834
- Founder: Benedictines
- Dedication: Saint Bega

Architecture
- Functional status: Active
- Heritage designation: Grade II listed
- Designated: 20 July 2005
- Architect: E. W. Pugin
- Style: Gothic Revival
- Completed: 1868
- Construction cost: £6,000

Administration
- Province: Liverpool
- Diocese: Lancaster
- Deanery: West Cumbria & Carlisle
- Parish: Whitehaven

St Begh's Church or St Begh's Priory Church is a Roman Catholic parish church in Whitehaven, Cumbria, England. It was built from 1865 to 1868 and designed by E. W. Pugin in the Gothic Revival style. It was founded and was administered by the Benedictines from Belmont Abbey, Herefordshire until May 2026 when they withdrew. It is located on the Coach Road in the Corkickle part of Whitehaven. It is a Grade II listed building.

== History ==
=== Foundation ===
In 1706, Benedictines from Douai in France came to Whitehaven and started a mission serving the local Catholic population in Whitehaven. The founder of the mission was Dom Francis Rich. In 1785, a chapel was built, it was located probably close to Catherine Street in the town centre. In 1824, with the Catholic population of the town increasing and the patronage of the local Lowther family of baronets, the chapel was expanded.

=== Construction ===
In 1834, the site of the current church was given to the Benedictines by William Lowther, 1st Earl of Lonsdale. That year, a chapel was built on the site. In 1865, the foundation stone of the current church was laid. The church was designed by E. W. Pugin, who also designed Killarney Cathedral and Shrewsbury Cathedral. The construction was done by a Mr Cousins of Whitehaven and the stoen carving was done by Mr Pickering of Carlisle. In 1868, the church was opened and the total cost was £6,000. As St Begh's Church was the first Roman Catholic church in Whitehaven since the Reformation, it became a centre from where other missions were started from. Some of these missions grew and new churches were built, such as St Gregory and St Patrick Church on Quay Street in Whitehaven, which was built in 1889.

== Parish ==
St Begh's Church is the parish church and in the same parish is St Gregory and St Patrick's Church, which was also served by Benedictine priests from Belmont Abbey. St Begh's Church has two Sunday Masses at 4:45pm on Saturday and 10:00am on Sunday. St Gregory and St Patrick's Church on Quay Street has one Sunday Mass at 8:30am.

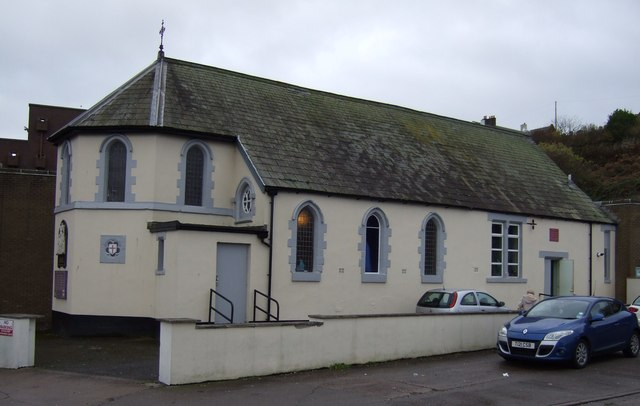
St Gregory and St Patrick's Church, in the same parish as St Begh's Church

== See also ==
- Belmont Abbey, Herefordshire
- Diocese of Lancaster
