= Credo (novel) =

1996 novel by Melvyn Bragg

Credo: An Epic Tale of the Dark Ages
- Author: Melvyn Bragg
- Genre: Historical fiction
- Published: 1996
- Publisher: Sceptre
- Pages: 800
- ISBN: 9-780-34066706-4

Credo: An Epic Tale of the Dark Ages is a historical fiction novel written by Melvyn Bragg and published in 1996. Bragg's sixteenth novel, it is set in the Celtic Christianity of seventh-century Britain.

Credo was published in the United States with the title The Sword and the Miracle.

== Plot ==
Credo's protagonist is a young Celtic princess, the semi-mythical St Bega. Bega and the fictional Prince Padric desire to marry against her father's wishes, and she vows celibacy to avoid an arranged marriage with a warrior. Bega founds a nunnery, while Padric fights the Saxons. Bega reflects on religious conscience and duty while Padric fights his arch-villain, Ecfrith.

The story features venerated figures of the period, notably saints Cuthbert, Wilfrid, and Hilda, and features the Synod of Whitby.

== Reception ==
In a negative review for The Independent, Hugo Barnacle called Credo "a very hard slog". Barnacle criticised the book's difficult language, which included anachronisms, "occasional lapses in sentence construction", and "leadenness of the style". He accused Bragg of "fall[ing] into an ungainly pomposity" by "misguidedly trying to do posh prose".
