= Sale Fell =

Mountain in United Kingdom

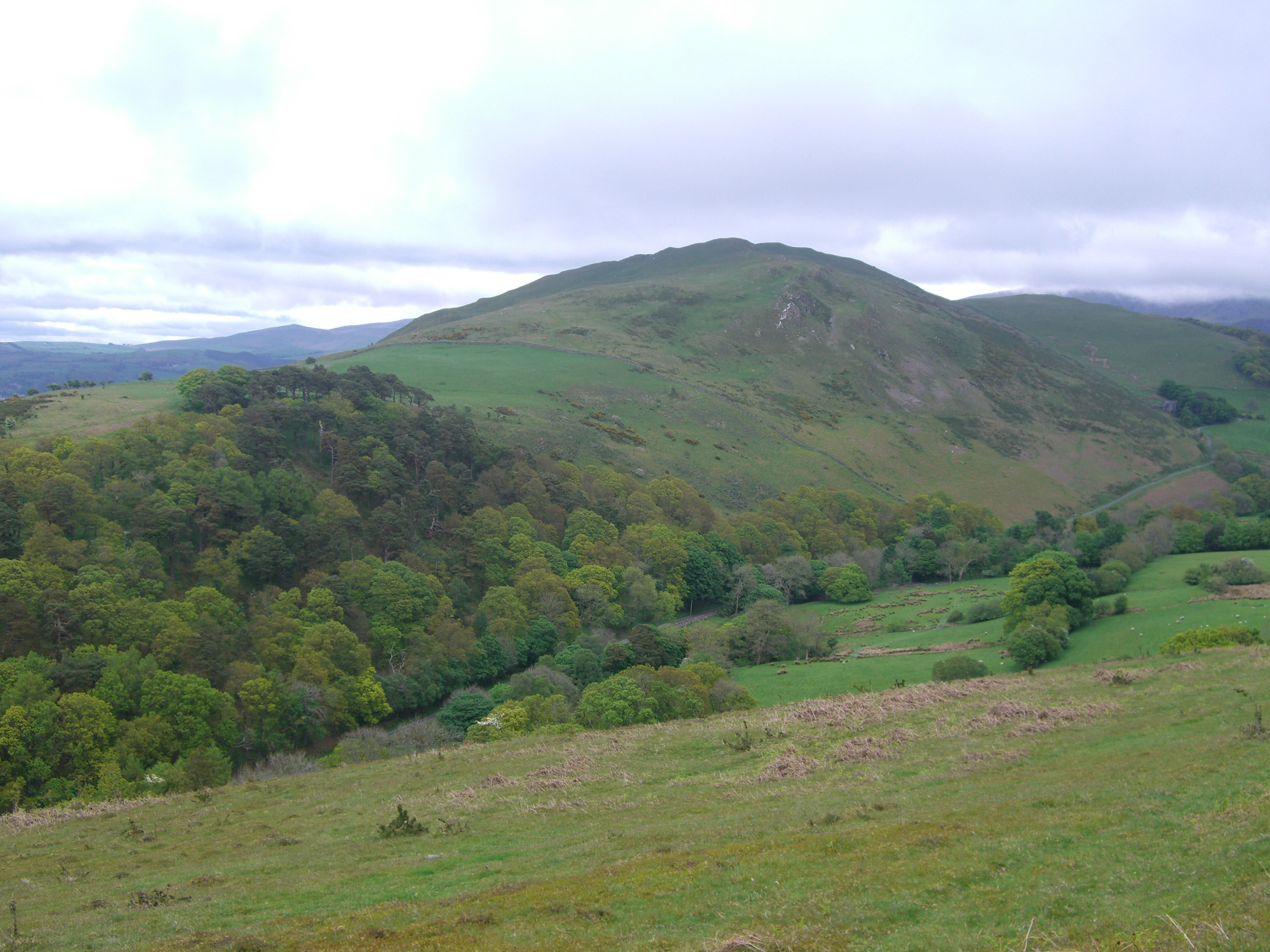
- Seen from the lower slopes of Ling Fell.

Highest point
- Elevation: 359 m (1,178 ft)
- Prominence: c. 125 m
- Parent peak: Lord's Seat
- Coordinates: 54°39′22″N 3°14′53″W

Geography
- Location within the Lake District
- Location: Cumbria, England
- Parent range: Lake District, North Western Fells
- OS grid: NY194297
- Topo map: OS Landranger 89, 90, Explorer OL4

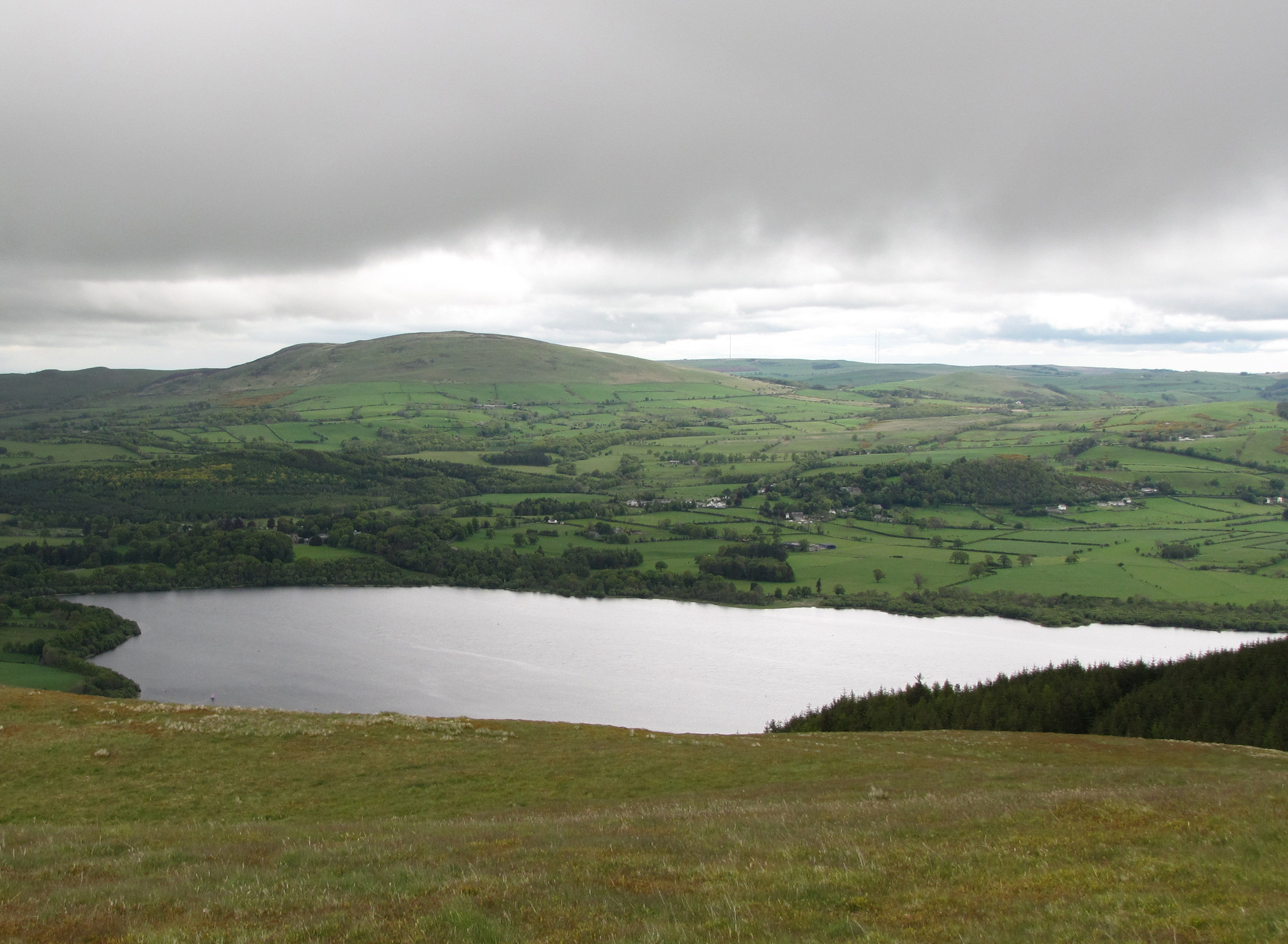
The view NE from the summit takes in the top end of Bassenthwaite Lake and the fell of Binsey.

Sale Fell is a small hill near Cockermouth in the English Lake District. It is popular with locals, as it offers gentle walking and lovely views across Bassenthwaite Lake to Skiddaw.

== Topography ==
The North Western Fells occupy the area between the rivers Derwent and Cocker, a broadly oval swathe of hilly country, elongated on a north-south axis. Two roads cross from east to west, dividing the fells into three convenient groups. The most northerly sector, rising between Whinlatter Pass and the Vale of Embleton includes Sale Fell.

Sale Fell and its twin companion to the west, Ling Fell, are the final hills with any lakeland character in the northwest of the district. Further north across the Vale of Embleton is a final group of very low tops on either side of the Derwent Valley but these are ignored by most guidebooks and hill lists. (apart from the all-inclusive Marilyns.)

The natural boundaries of the fell are Bassenthwaite Lake to the east, Wythop Valley to the south and west, and the Vale of Embleton to the north. Sale Fell is a satellite of Lord's Seat, the highest of the hills north of Whinlatter. The connecting high ground runs southeastward above the shore of Bassenthwaite before turning inland to the summit of the parent fell. The connection is extremely tenuous, passing along a very narrow strip of land between Wythop Beck and Beck Wythop. These two streams run side by side down the slopes of Lord's Seat before diverging to surround Sale Fell on all sides. Wythop Beck is the main stream of the Wythop Valley, running west around Sale Fell and then out down the narrow wooded defile which stands between it and Ling Fell. Joining the Dubwath Beck it then flows eastward along the Vale of Embleton and into the northern end of Bassenthwaite. Beck Wythop by contrast cuts through the ridge of high ground running alongside Bassenthwaite and drops directly into the lake.

Sale Fell itself is an east-west ridge about a mile long, clad primarily in fell grass and bracken The eastern end is heavily forested as part of Wythop Wood. These are mostly conifers, although the mix of trees is gradually changing. There are Forestry Commission offices hidden in the trees at the base of the fell. The summit of the fell is toward the west of the ridge and there are two other tops to the east. Rivings (1,099 ft) and Lothwaite (1,132 ft) are included in some guidebooks

== Geology ==
The fell is predominantly composed of Ordovician rocks of the Loweswater Formation. This consists of greywacke sandstone turbidities. The southern flanks are of the laminated mudstone and siltstone of the Kirk Stile Formation.

== Summit ==
A small cairn sits on an expanse of grass. The view of the Skiddaw group is excellent and the Helvellyn range is also laid out end to end. Most of the District is unfortunately obscured by the Lord's Seat ridge. Bassenthwaite Lake completes the eastern foreground, the hills of Galloway are visible across the Solway Firth, whilst the Isle of Man can be seen to the west.

== Ascents ==
From the Pheasant Inn at the northern end of the lake, a side road runs west towards Routenbeck and Wythop Mill. A footpath branches off left before St Margaret's Church and makes up the fellside, joining a terrace path higher up. There is now a choice, either making for the western end of the summit ridge or joining it to the east near the forest fence.

From the village of Wythop Mill, the road between Ling Fell and Sale Fell provides a starting point, branching off up the fellside at the gate of Kelswick Farm.

There is no ridge connection to Ling Fell although the two can be easily climbed from Wythop Mill.
