= Barf (Lake District) =

Town in Cumbria, England

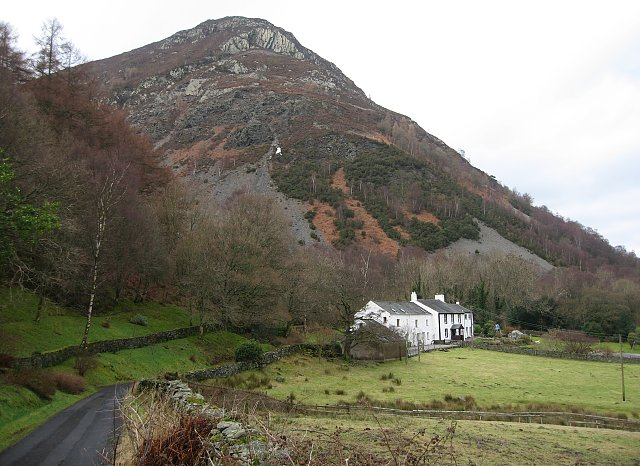
- Barf and Beckstones

Highest point
- Elevation: 468 m (1,535 ft)
- Prominence: c. 20 m
- Parent peak: Lord's Seat
- Listing: Wainwright
- Coordinates: 54°37′48″N 3°13′05″W

Geography
- Location within the Lake District
- Location: Cumbria, England
- Parent range: Lake District, North Western Fells
- OS grid: NY216267
- Topo map: OS Landranger 89, 90, Explorer OL4

Barf is a fell in the north-western Lake District in Cumbria, UK. It stands on the south-western shore of Bassenthwaite Lake. Barf is well known for a whitewashed pillar of rock on the lower slopes, the so-called "Bishop's Rock" or "Bishop of Barf". The name is thought to be a derivative of "burgh".

== Topography ==
Barf is properly an eastern shoulder of Lord's Seat, but was accorded the status of a separate fell by Alfred Wainwright in his influential Pictorial Guide to the Lakeland Fells. The eastern face is a steep wall of scree, falling to the Keswick to Cockermouth road and the lakeshore.

The southern boundary of the fell is Beckstones Gill, falling over a series of small waterfalls from near the summit of Lord's Seat. At the base of the slope it flows past the former Swan Hotel and into the head of the lake. To the south of Barf are Ullister Hill and Seat How, satellites of Lord's Seat which Wainwright chose to leave within the bounds of the parent fell.

To the north of Barf is an unnamed stream falling to the lakeshore at Woodend, beyond which the land slowly falls away to Beck Wythop. To the north and south of the fell's borders the slopes are forested with conifers, but Barf itself remains bare barring a belt of deciduous woodland at the very bottom.

The eastern face begins with several hundred feet of shifting scree, giving way to rough and loose crags higher up; Slape Crag is the main face. The whole slope falls some 900 ft in a quarter of a mile.

The connection to Lord's Seat is via a broad heather-clad depression to the west of the summit, easy walking being possible although there are some boggy patches.

== The Bishop of Barf ==
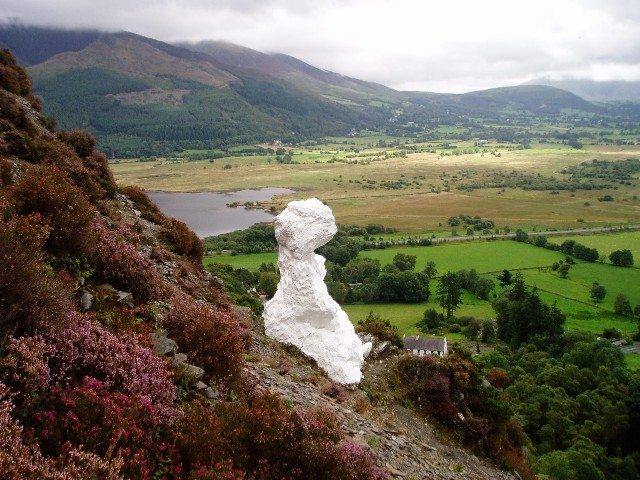
The Bishop of Barf

On a rocky site at 700 ft and clearly visible from the Cockermouth to Keswick road, is the "Bishop of Barf", a white painted stone marking the spot where, according to local legend, the Bishop of Derry was killed falling from his horse in 1783, after drunkenly betting he could ride up the hill. Both the Bishop and his horse are said to be buried near a smaller stone, the Clerk, at the base of the hill. Sadly, the story, although imaginative, forgets that the Bishop of Derry of the time died 20 years later in Italy. However, this Bishop's colourful life no doubt inspired a tale capable of capturing the imagination. The stone was whitewashed each year by staff at the nearby Swan Hotel, until the Hotel was converted to apartments.

The Bishop stands about 7 ft high on the shortest side, while the Clerk is a much smaller conical stone.

== Geology ==
Barf is a part of the Loweswater Formation of Ordovician rocks. This is composed of Greywacke sandstone turbidities. The lower eastern slopes show outcropping of the Kirkstile Formation, the typical rock of the Skiddaw group.

There is evidence of historic mining activity on the north bank of Beckstones Gill, below the east face and also near Woodend. Small amounts of lead and zinc were raised between 1532 and 1891, the principal ores being blende, cerussite and galena.

== Summit ==
The summit is a small platform with a thin covering of grass, only a little way back from the eastern slope. The view eastward to Skiddaw and Longside Edge is excellent, with Bassenthwaite Lake in the foreground. A selection of the Eastern and Southern Fells can also be seen. Lord's Seat blocks much of the panorama westward although the sea makes an appearance.

== Ascents ==
The direct assault via the Bishop is described by Wainwright as "Not a walk. A very stiff scramble, suitable only for people overflowing with animal strength and vigour.". This route is strongly discouraged by signs at the foot, and listed as an accident hotspot by the local mountain rescue. In January 2023 was the site of a rescue prominently covered in the national press. A line further to the south following Beckstones Gill is perhaps to be preferred. Barf can easily be gained indirectly, having first ascended Lord's Seat.
