= Criffel =

Hill in Dumfries and Galloway, Scotland

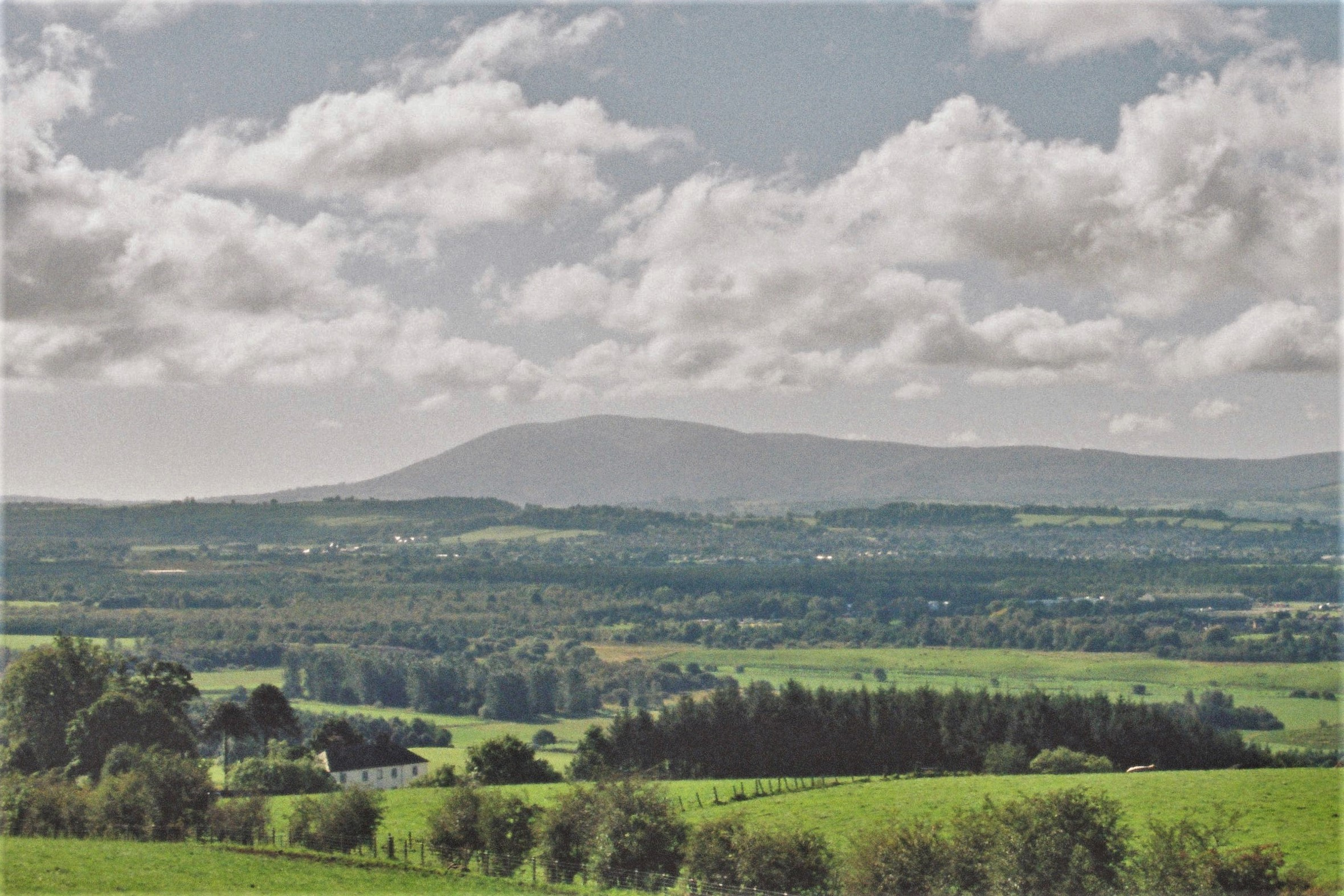

Highest point
- Elevation: 570 m (1,870 ft)
- Prominence: 488 m (1,601 ft)
- Coordinates: 54.93992°N 3.62961°W

Geography
- Location: Dumfries and Galloway, Scotland
- Parent range: Southern Uplands
- OS grid: NX957618
- Topo map: OS Landranger 84

Criffel is a hill in the historical county of Kirkcudbrightshire, Dumfries and Galloway, south-west Scotland. It is 570 m (1,870 ft) high but appears higher because of its great isolation and high prominence. It is a prominent feature in many of the views from the northern Lake District on a clear day. It is surrounded by a host of satellites, including Long Fell, Maidenpap and Bainloch Hill. The slopes of Criffel feature the upland vegetation of heather, bog cotton and blaeberry and are inhabited by skylarks. Loch Kindar sits at the foot of the hill.

== Etymology ==
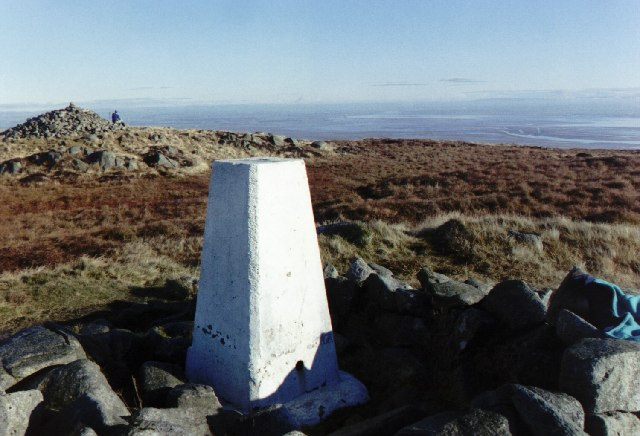
Triangulation station and Douglas's Cairn, at the summit of Criffel

The name Criffel is recorded in 1273 as Crufel. The second element, -fel, is either Older Scots or Northern Middle English fell or Old Norse fjall 'mountain'. Because Old Norse fjall had been borrowed into Middle English by the twelfth century, it is not possible to determine whether or not the name was coined by Scandinavian speakers. There have been a number of proposals for the etymology of the first element. The name is recorded as Crofel in 1319 and in 1330 as Crefel. (Drummond also gives the form Crafel in 1330; it is not clear if this refers to the same source.) In 1892 Johnston proposed Gaelic crich 'boundary' + Icelandic fell in Place-Names of Scotland. However, by the second edition of 1903 he thought a derivation from Icelandic kryfja 'to split' was more probable. In the third edition in 1934 this is the only derivation offered. Mills also takes the name to be Old Scandinavian kryfja + fjall but adds that the first element is 'doubtful'. In 1930 Maxwell proposed Scandinavian kraka fjall 'raven's or crow's hill' or Lowland Scots Craw Fell. William J. Watson rejected a derivation from kraka fjall on the grounds that it would develop into a form like Crackel. Geoffery Barrow suggested that Criffel incorporates the name Cro, which also appears in Desnes Cro, the name of a deanery located between the rivers Nith and Urr. Here Cro represents the Gaelic word for sheepfold.

== See also ==
- List of places in Dumfries and Galloway
- List of Marilyns in the Scottish Lowlands
