= Bassenthwaite =

Village and civil parish in England

Coordinates: 54.68°N 3.196°W

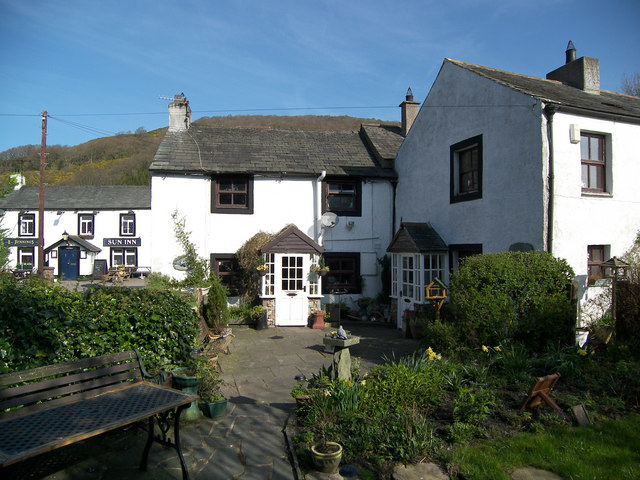
- Bassenthwaite Cottages and Sun Inn

- Location in Allerdale, Cumbria Location within Cumbria
- Population: 481 (2011)
- OS grid reference: NY2332
- Civil parish: Bassenthwaite
- Unitary authority: Cumberland
- Ceremonial county: Cumbria
- Region: North West
- Country: England
- Sovereign state: United Kingdom
- Post town: KESWICK
- Postcode district: CA12
- Dialling code: 017687
- Police: Cumbria
- Fire: Cumbria
- Ambulance: North West
- UK Parliament: Penrith and Solway

Bassenthwaite is a village and civil parish to the east of Bassenthwaite Lake in Cumbria, historically part of Cumberland, within the Lake District National Park, England. According to the 2001 census it had a population of 412, increasing to 481 at the 2011 Census. There is a Church of England Church, St John's Bassenthwaite and a tiny Methodist chapel. The village contains many elements of the archetypal English village including a green, primary school and a stream that runs through it.

Bassenthwaite is at the foot of Skiddaw, one of the highest mountains in England at 3,054 feet (931 m). Robin Hood, Skiddaw, Ullock Pike, Longside Edge and Barf can be seen from the village. Part of the parish lies within the Skiddaw Group SSSI (Site of Special Scientific Interest).

== Location ==
Bassenthwaite is approximately 1 mile (1.6 km) from Bassenthwaite Lake, 7.5 miles (12.1 km) east of Cockermouth, 7.1 miles (11.4 km) north of Keswick, 23 miles (37 km) south of Carlisle and 23.9 miles (38.5 km) west of Penrith.

== Toponymy ==
The name 'Bassenthwaite' is derived from an Old Norse name meaning Bastun's clearing. The 1st element is usually taken to be the Anglo-French nickname or surname Bastun, originally meaning stick, while the 2nd is the Old Norse þveit meaning clearing. The lake, in early times known as Bastun's water, takes its name from the village.

== Governance ==
Bassenthwaite is part of the parliamentary constituency of Penrith and Solway.

For Local Government purposes it is in the Cumberland unitary authority area.

Bassenthwaite has its own Parish Council; Bassenthwaite Parish Council.

== St Bega's Church ==
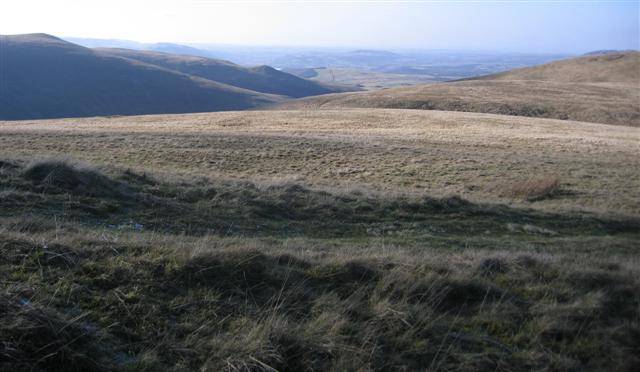
Bassenthwaite

The Church of St Bega is the parish church of Bassenthwaite, it's in a field near the lake, some distance away from the village. It was built about 950 AD and is a Grade II* listed building,

St John's Church was built later as a chapel of ease.

== See also ==
- Listed buildings in Bassenthwaite
- St Bega's Way
