= Ullock Pike =

Fell in the Lake District, England

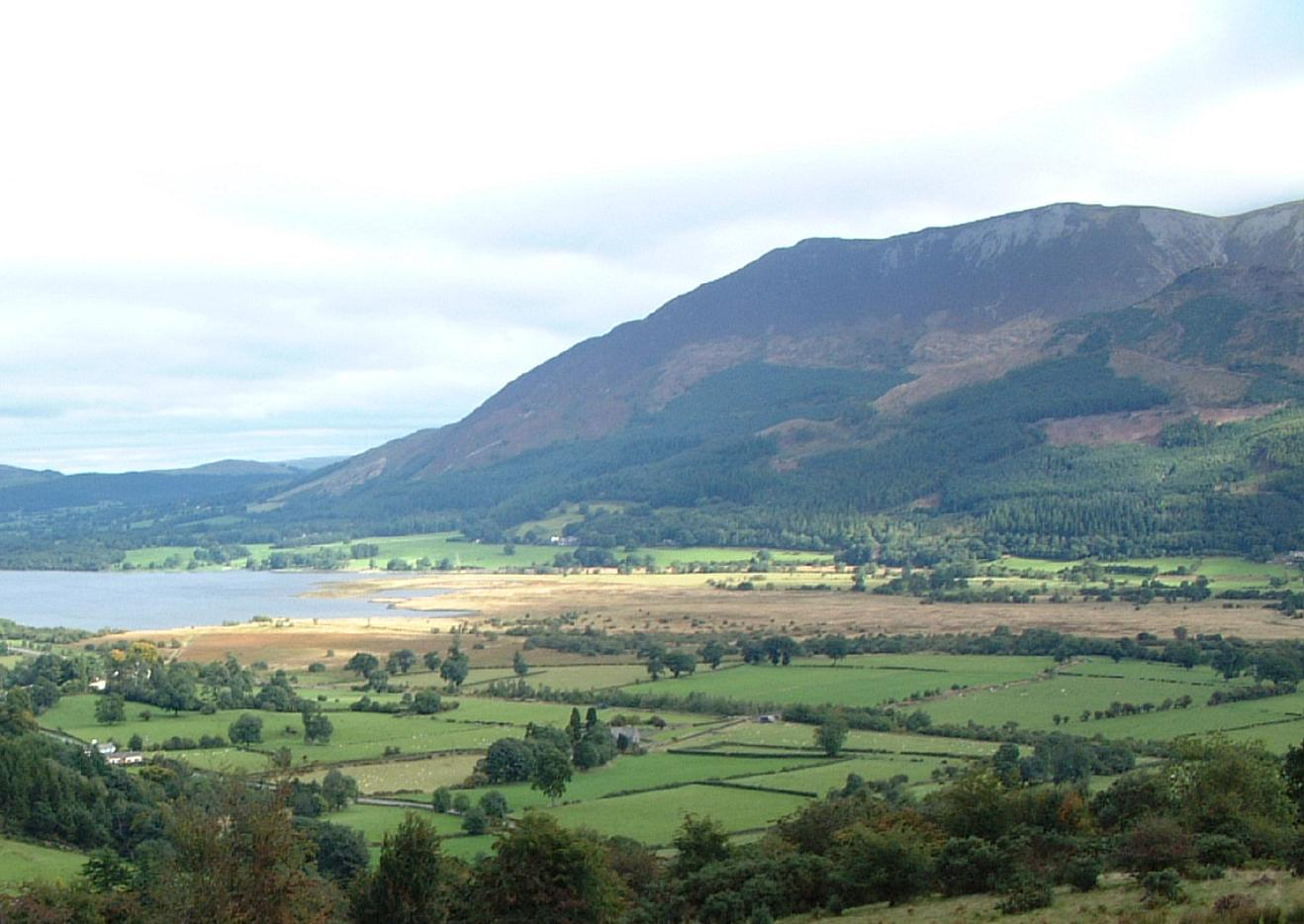
- Ullock Pike and Longside Edge from the Whinlatter Pass road.

Highest point
- Elevation: 691 m (2,267 ft)
- Prominence: 14 m (46 ft)
- Parent peak: Long Side
- Listing: Wainwright
- Coordinates: 54°38′53″N 3°10′23″W

Geography
- Location within the Lake District
- Location: Cumbria, England
- Parent range: Lake District, Northern Fells
- OS grid: NY244287
- Topo map: OS Landranger 89, 90, OS Explorer 4

Ullock Pike is a fell situated in northern part of the English Lake District. It is located seven kilometres north west of Keswick and achieves a height of 691 metres (2,267 ft). The fell sits on Skiddaw’s south western ridge along with two other fells (Long Side and Carl Side), this ridge is regarded as the finest way to ascend Skiddaw, with Alfred Wainwright commenting:

‘There is no doubt in my mind that by far the best approach to the top of Skiddaw is by way of its north-west ridge. This offers a fine expedition along a narrow crest in exciting surroundings and provides excellent views throughout … for the collector of summits here are three waiting to be picked off in addition to Skiddaw’.

== Name ==
The fell’s name comes from the Old Norse language and translates as ‘The peak where the wolves play’. With úlfr meaning wolf and leikr meaning play, there are records that the fell was called Ulvelaik in the 13th century.

== Topography ==
Ullock Pike drops away steeply on its eastern side to the little-known valley of Southerndale while its western slopes, which are clothed in woodland lower down, fall to Bassenthwaite Lake. When viewed from the north Ullock Pike is observed as a slender peak which catches the eye but from other directions it is seen as just a bump at the end of Longside Edge. The fell of Long Side is just 600 metres (660 yd) away along the ridge to the south west and Ullock Pike has just 14 metres of topographic prominence from it and therefore fails to qualify as a Hewitt or a Nuttall and relies on Wainwright to give it the status of a separate fell, which he does mainly because of the quality of the view and the excellence of its form from the north.

Ullock Pike has a low-lying outlying top, which stands 1.5 kilometres (1 mile) away along the northern ridge and has the unusual name of ‘Watches’. With a height of 333 metres (1,093 ft) it is a distinctive summit made more remarkable by an unusual rash of igneous rocks amongst the grass and local Skiddaw slate. These give the initial impression of being an ancient stone circle or even a small quarry but are apparently a natural rock formation.

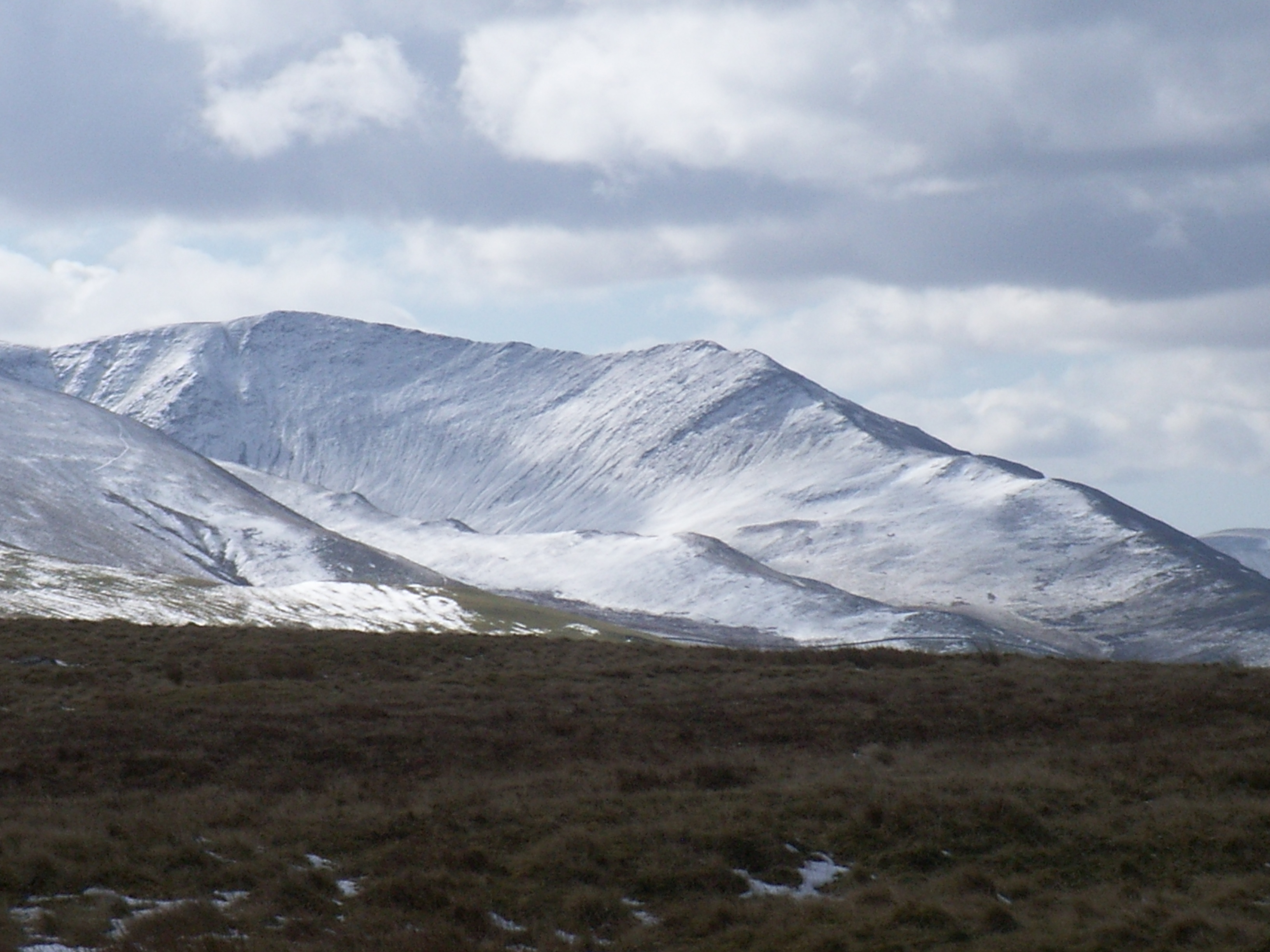
Ullock Pike (centre) and Long Side (left) from the north east

== Geology ==
In common with much of the Northern Fells the Kirk Stile Formation of the Skiddaw Group predominates. This is composed of laminated mudstone and siltstone with greywacke sandstone and is of Ordovician age. There are many small intrusions of lamprophyre and diorite.

== Ascents ==
There are two possible starting points for the ascent of Ullock Pike from the north, the one from the Ravenstone Hotel at grid reference NY235296 is hampered by a lack of parking space but does have a bus stop (there is parking in Dodd Wood 1.5 km to the south). The other starting place is at NY236310 on the minor road to Orthwaite. Both routes utilise the northern ridge to climb the fell. There is a significant false top which is in view for a long time before the true summit is attained.

== Summit ==
The top of the fell is a small neat spot carpeted with heather which gives a fine all-round view even though it is curtailed by the bulk of Skiddaw to the east.
