= Carl Side =

Mountain in the Lake District, England

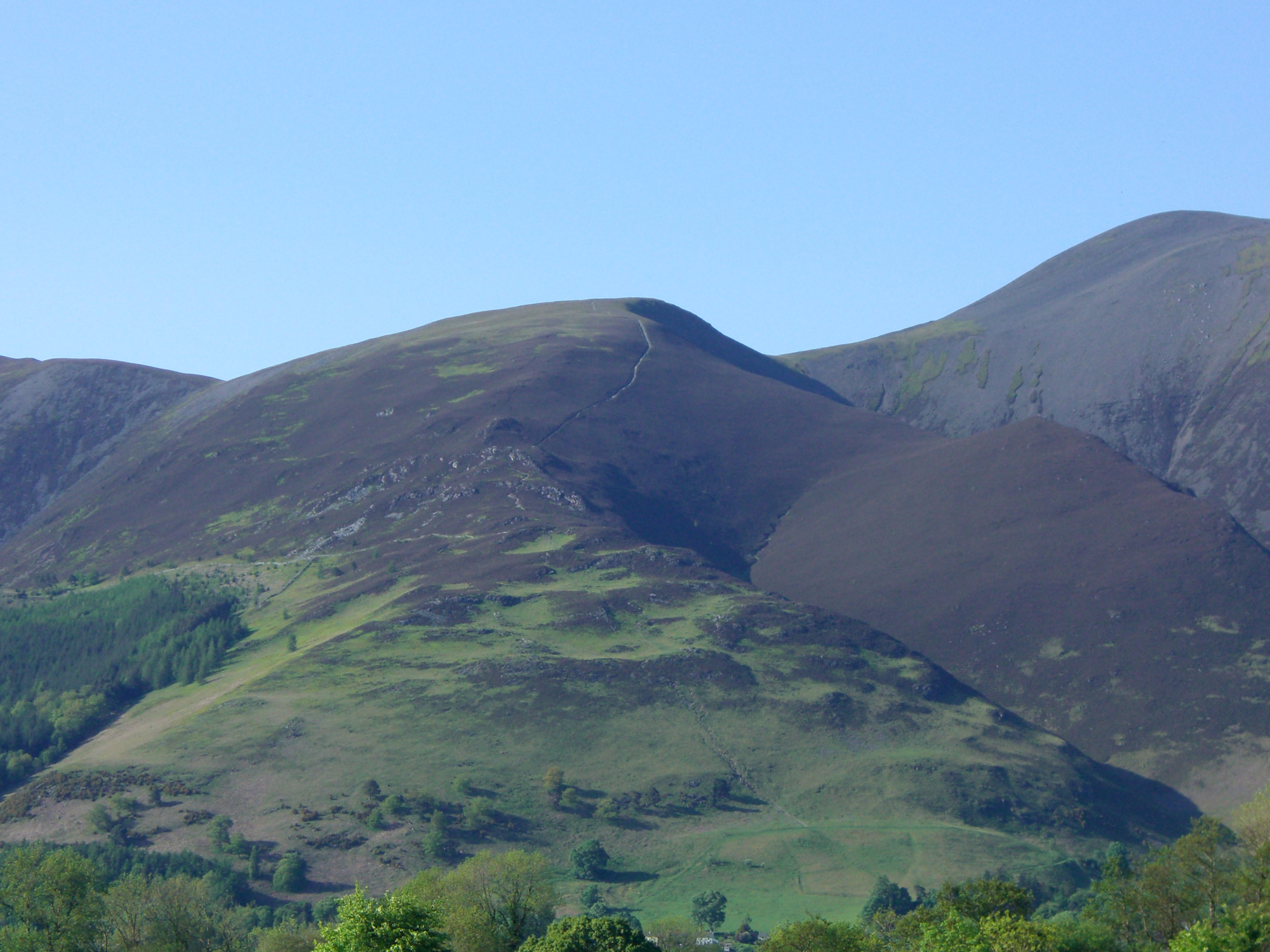
- Carl Side from the village of Portinscale with Skiddaw rising on the right

Highest point
- Elevation: 746 m (2,448 ft)
- Prominence: c. 30 metres (98 ft)
- Parent peak: Skiddaw
- Listing: Hewitt, Nuttall, Wainwright
- Coordinates: 54°38′30″N 3°09′21″W

Geography
- Location within the Lake District
- Location: Cumbria, England
- Parent range: Lake District, Northern Fells
- OS grid: NY255280
- Topo map: OS Landrangers 89, 90, Explorer OL4

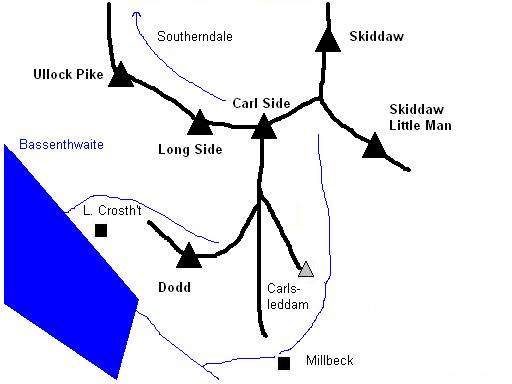
sketch map of Carl Side

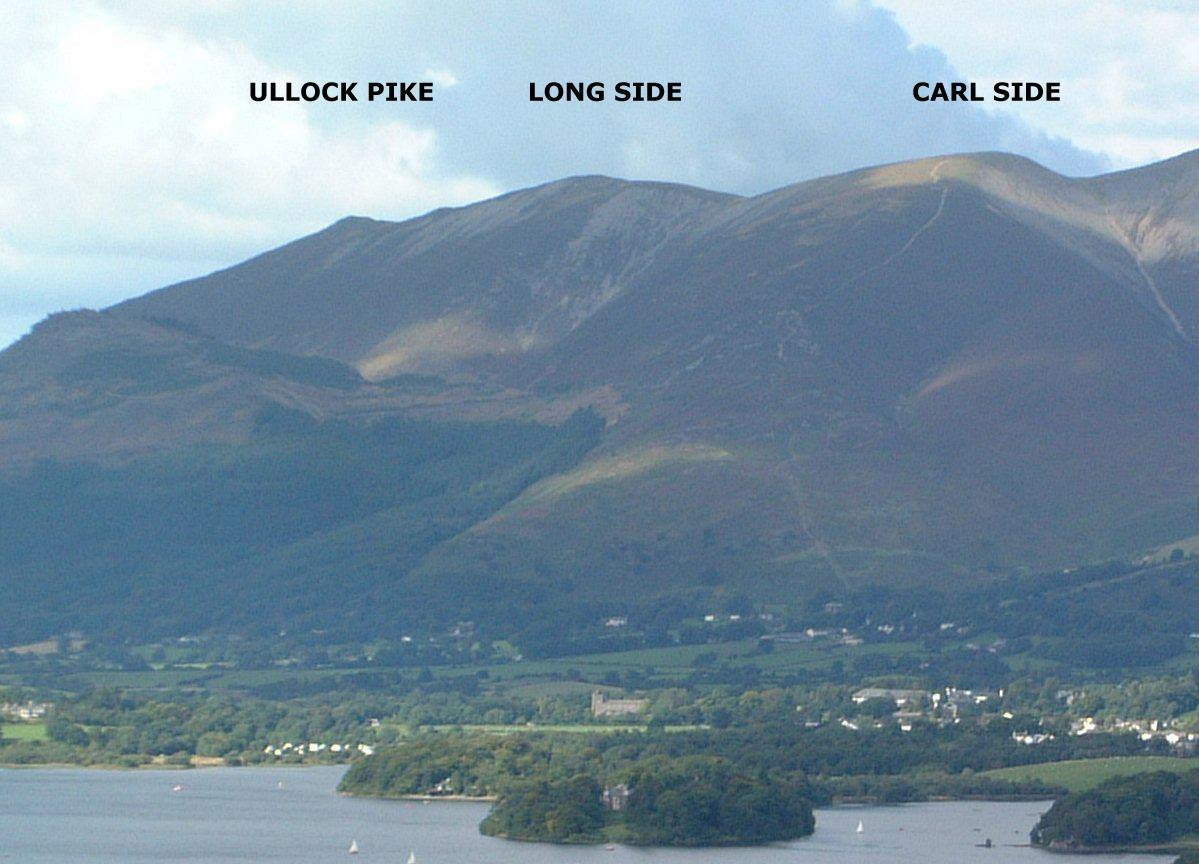
A distant shot of the three fells on Long Side Edge

Carl Side is a fell in the English Lake District, forming a part of the Skiddaw "family" near the town of Keswick and prominently visible from its streets. It is listed in Alfred Wainwright's Pictorial Guides to the Lakeland Fells as one of the Northern Fells.

== Summit ==
The summit is a predominantly grassy plateau smoothly sloping away on all sides except to the north, where some shattered crags look down upon Southerndale. A small cairn marks the highest point. The view southward down Derwentwater is excellent, backed by a wide vista of fells from Clough Head to Sale Fell. Tewet Tarn on High Rigg is the only other significant visible body of water. Nearer at hand the grey flanks of Skiddaw and Little Man loom above the summit.

== Topography ==
A ridge, known as Longside Edge, descends south-westward from the summit plateau of Skiddaw before swinging around to the west and finally north, descending the three fells of Carl Side, Long Side and Ullock Pike. Between Longside Edge and the mass of Skiddaw is the valley of Southerndale. Carl Side stands at the southern extremity of the curving ridge, having a triangular plan with ridges to the north-west, north-east and south.

To the north-east the fell is separated from Skiddaw by Carlside Col (2,345 feet, 715 m), a depression that contains Carlside Tarn, the only standing water found at any altitude in the Skiddaw group. Very shallow and frequently dry in summer, the tarn has no plant life. Set in a particularly windy location, the slight retaining bank at the south-eastern edge may be in danger of erosion. The Skiddaw side of the col is a rough scree slope while the Carl Side slope is gentler and grassed.

From the summit of Carl Side a system of ridges descends southward towards Millbeck. The main spur runs straight for a mile, the first half being of gentler gradient and culminating in a large patch of white stones at about 1,600 feet (490 m). There is a very short rocky arête here, before the spur falls abruptly to the valley floor. On the eastern side of this section are the crags of Doups. The southern ridge sends out shorter branches on either side, just above the patch of white stones. On the western side across the rocky col of Long Doors is Dodd, a fell on Forestry Commission land that is largely wooded. To the east is Carlsleddam, a steep sided spur that appears sharply peaked from below: though less inspiring close up it does have a narrow and airy summit ridge.

The north-western connection to Long Side is a narrower ridge with rough ground to the north, bounding the head of Southerndale. Southerndale Beck, like all of the waters of Carl Side, ultimately finds its way to Bassenthwaite Lake, curving around the northern tip of Ullock Pike.

The eastern boundary of the fell is formed by Slade's Beck, a stream flowing over several dams and weirs to Millbeck. Across the valley is Skiddaw Little Man. To the south west Skill Beck falls from Long Doors through a heavily forested valley between Carl Side and Dodd.

== Geology ==
In common with much of the Northern Fells the Kirk Stile Formation of the Skiddaw Group predominates. This is composed of laminated mudstone and siltstone with greywacke sandstone and is of Ordovician age.

A trial level can be found in the little valley between Carlsleddam and the south ridge. This exploited a vein containing baryte and galena and operated in the 1870s.

== Ascents ==
Carl Side is often climbed indirectly via Ullock Pike and Long Side, the narrow ridge providing a fine walk which is often continued to Skiddaw. Millbeck provides the nearest starting point, with variations possible via Carlsleddam, the south ridge, the intervening valley and Slade's Beck.

A start can also be made from Little Crosthwaite, a small settlement at the foot of Dodd along the Carlisle road, climbing through the forestry to Long Doors before joining the south ridge. Indirect climbs via Dodd are also possible although the going can be very rough.

From High Side near Bassenthwaite an approach can be made along the length of Southerndale, ascending finally to Carlside Col.
