= Long Side =

Mountain in the Lake District, England

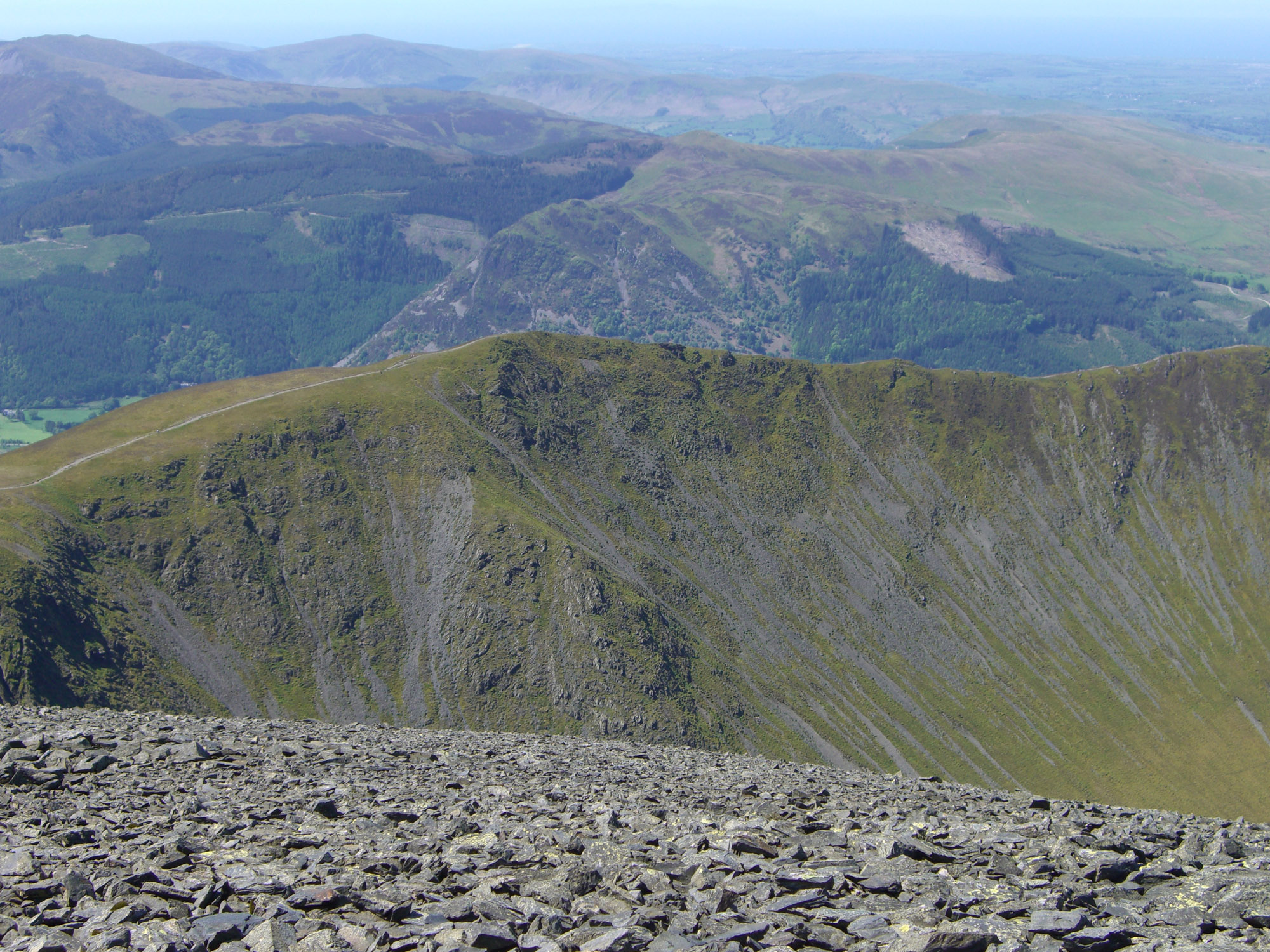
- Seen across Southerndale from the summit of Skiddaw, 1.5 km to the NE.

Highest point
- Elevation: 734 m (2,408 ft)
- Prominence: 40 m (130 ft)
- Parent peak: Skiddaw
- Listing: Hewitt, Wainwright, Nuttall
- Coordinates: 54°38′42″N 3°09′54″W

Geography
- Location within the Lake District
- Location: Cumbria, England
- Parent range: Lake District, Northern Fells
- OS grid: NY248284
- Topo map: OS Landranger 89, 90 OS Explorer 4

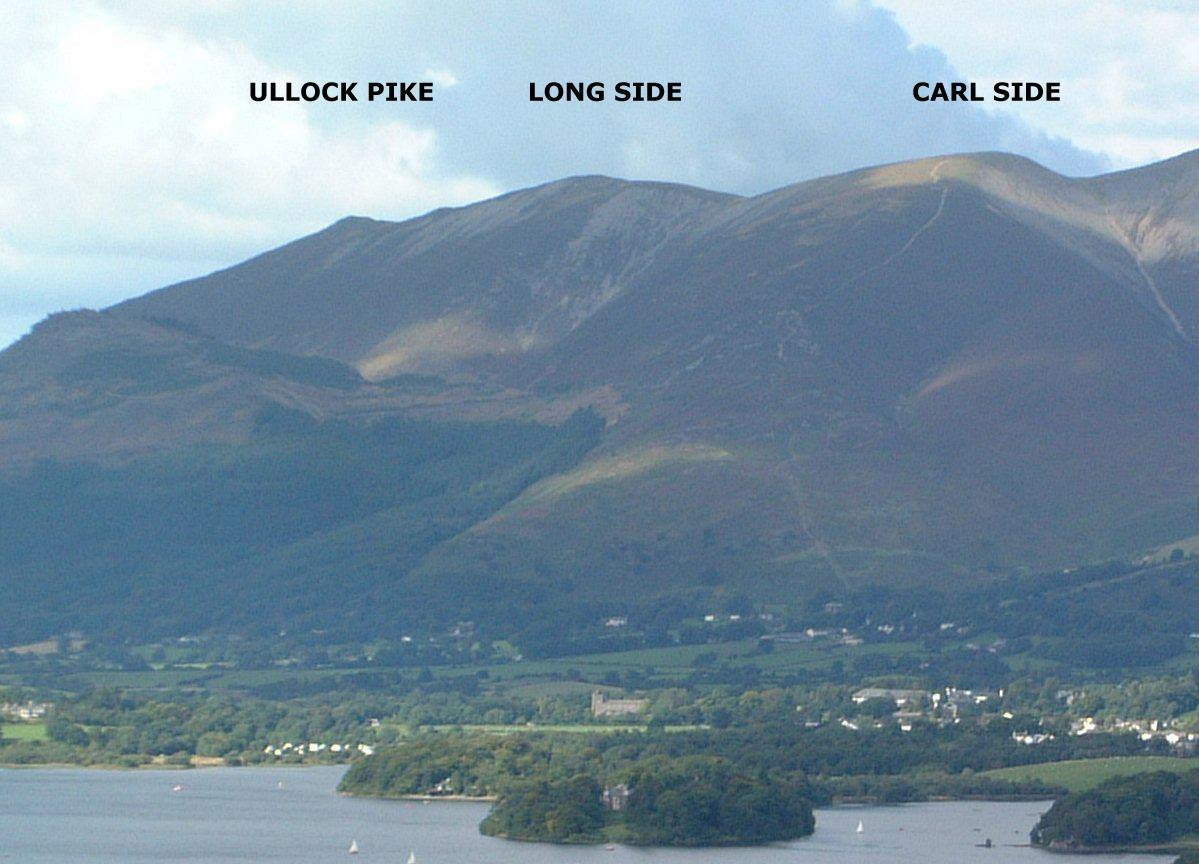
A distant shot of the three fells on Long Side Edge.

Long Side is a fell in the English Lake District, it is situated six kilometres north west of Keswick in the northern sector of the national park and is part of the Skiddaw group of fells. Long Side which reaches a height of 734 metres (2,408 ft) is located on Skiddaw’s north western ridge, the middle section of which is known as Longside Edge. Strictly speaking the actual summit of the fell is nameless with the name Long Side applying to the south western slope below the summit and is so marked on maps. The fell is often climbed by walkers on their way to the summit of Skiddaw, the route up the north west ridge which passes over Long Side is regarded as being the finest and quietest ascent of that 3,000-foot (910 m) mountain by guide book writers.

== Topography ==
Long Side falls away steeply on its south western flank towards Bassenthwaite Lake, these slopes are clothed in the coniferous woodlands of Longside Wood below the 400 metre contour. To the north west the fell descends in steep broken crags to the quiet and unfrequented valley of Southerndale. To the north west the fell connects to the adjacent fell of Ullock Pike by a path that runs for 600 metres (2,000 ft) along the rim of Longside Edge. To the south east the edge continues from Long Side to link to the higher fell of Carl Side, 800 metres (2,600 ft) distant.

== Geology ==
In common with much of the Northern Fells the Kirk Stile Formation of the Skiddaw Group predominates. This is composed of laminated mudstone and siltstone with greywacke sandstone and is of Ordovician age.

== Ascents ==
As mentioned ascents of Long Side are often done by walkers en route to Skiddaw, this route starts at the Ravenstone Hotel on the A591 (grid reference NY235296) and climbs Ullock Pike first by its northern ridge before continuing along Longside Edge to the summit of Long Side. The route to Skiddaw keeps on the ridge to Carl Side before ascending a steep loose path through the scree to the summit of Skiddaw. A direct ascent of Long Side is possible from the Old Sawmill car park (grid reference NY235281) on the A591 using the Forestry Commission way marked trail to find a way through Longside Wood to the open fell and then ascending the steep fell side to the summit.

== Summit ==
The summit is marked by a pile of stones. There is a fine view of Bassenthwaite lake. To the east Skiddaw is seen as a massive bulk blocking out much of the view in that direction.

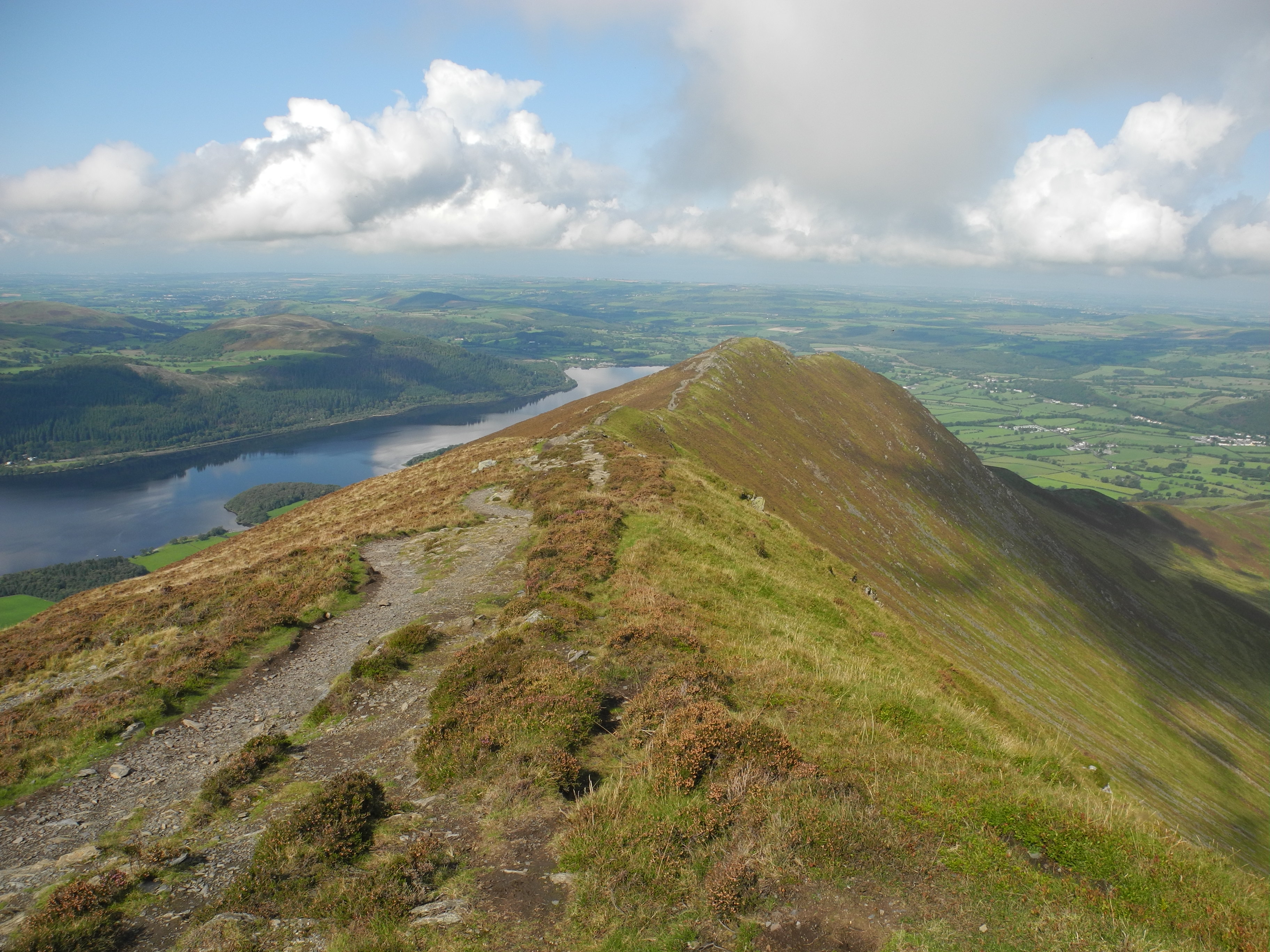
Looking north from Long Side to Ullock Pike and Bassenthwaite Lake.
