= Skiddaw Little Man =

Fell in the Lake District, Cumbria, England

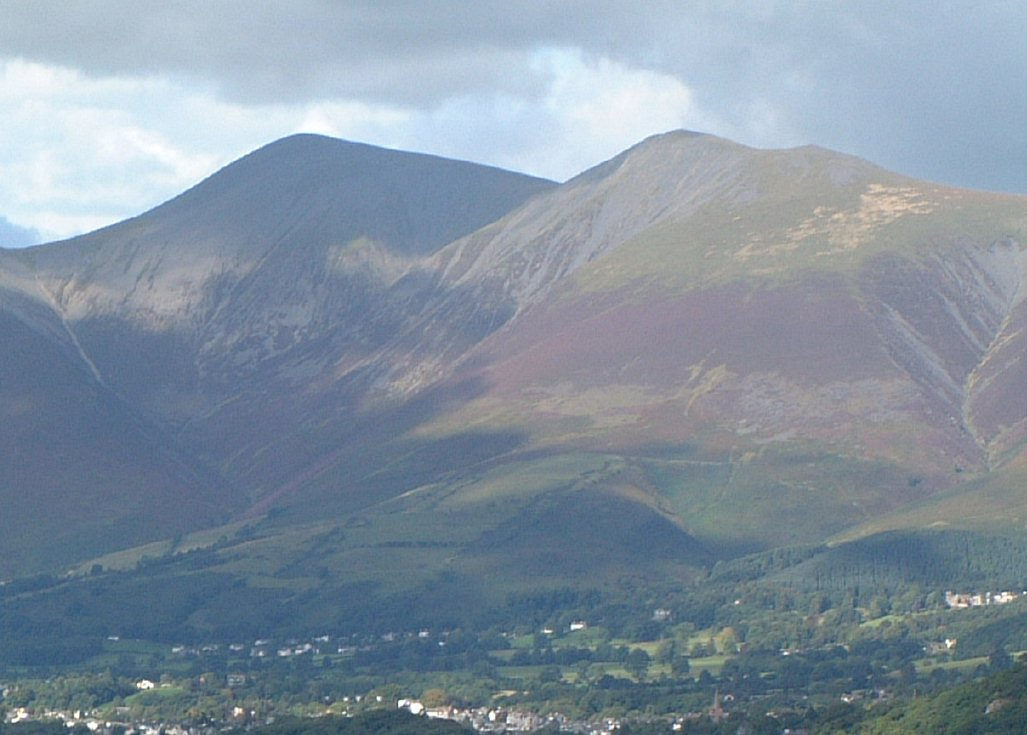
- Skiddaw (left) and Little Man (right) tower above Keswick.

Highest point
- Elevation: 865 m (2,838 ft)
- Prominence: 61 m (200 ft)
- Parent peak: Skiddaw
- Listing: Hewitt, Wainwright, Nuttall
- Coordinates: 54°38′21″N 3°08′20″W

Geography
- Location within the Lake District
- Location: Cumbria, England
- Parent range: Lake District, Northern Fells
- OS grid: NY266277
- Topo map: OS Landranger 89, 90 OS Explorer 4

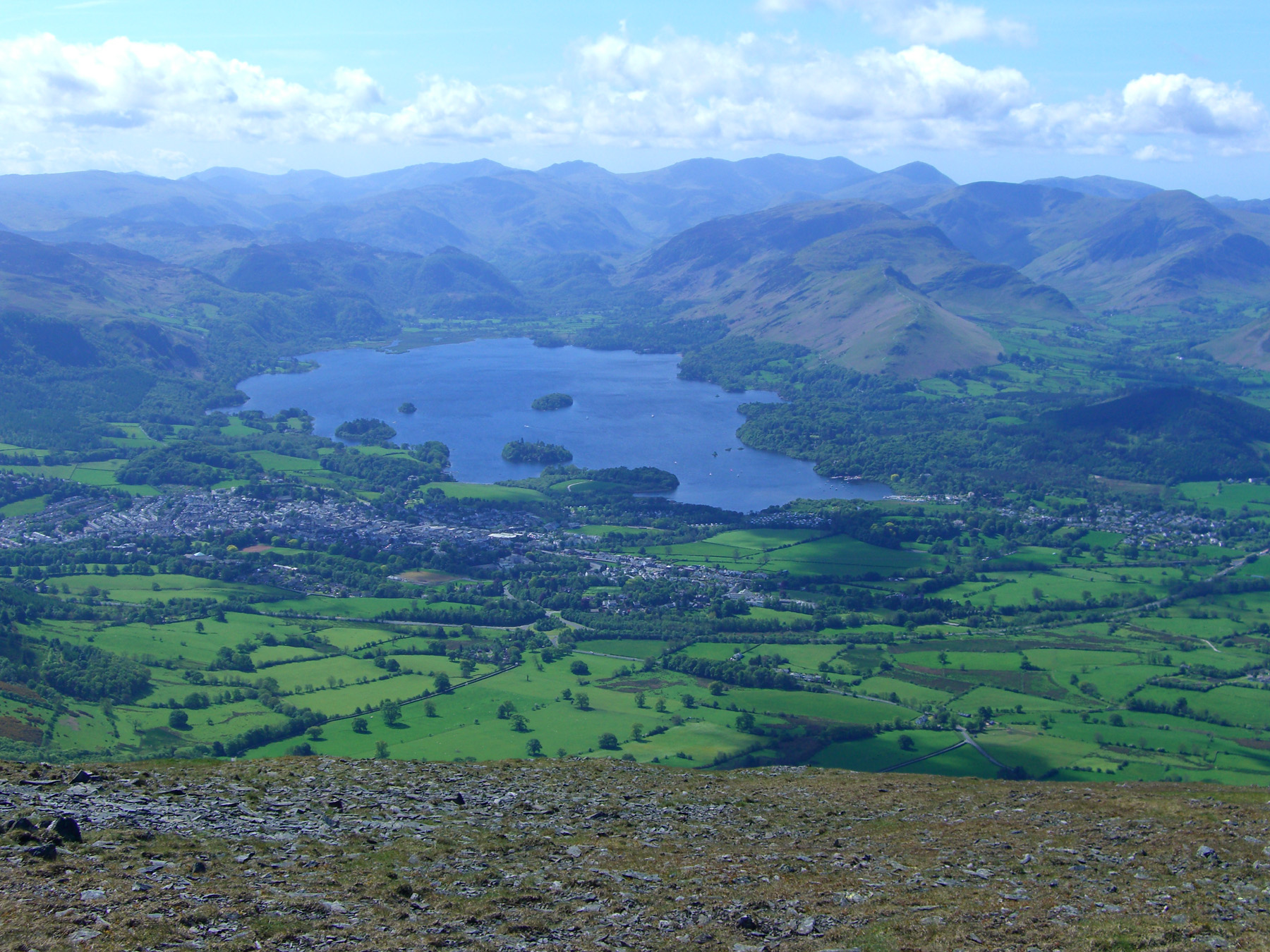
The view south from Little Man over Derwentwater.

Skiddaw Little Man, also called Little Man, is a fell in the English Lake District; it is situated four kilometres north of the town of Keswick and reaches a height of 865 metres (2,838 ft).

== Topography ==
Little Man is often overlooked and disregarded as an independent and distinct fell owing to its name making it sound like a minor top of its parent fell Skiddaw, which in fact lies 1.5 kilometres (1 mile) northwest. With a topographical prominence of 61 metres (200 ft), Little Man qualifies comfortably as a Hewitt and Nuttall hill and is regarded as a separate fell by renowned mountain writers Alfred Wainwright and Bill Birkett. The fell is actually called Little Man on Ordnance Survey maps and by many guide books.

To the north and east Little Man is connected to the Skiddaw massif, Lonscale Fell being the nearest separate fell to the east, 2.5 km (1 1/2 mi) away. To the south and the west the fell falls away steeply, with fast flowing streams draining the fell into the River Derwent. Five hundred metres (1,600 ft) southeast of the main summit lies an 815-metre-high (2,674 ft) lower top called Lesser Man, which is adorned with an unusual cairn consisting of rocks and old fence posts. A further 500 m (1,600 ft) southeast of Lesser Man, on the other side of the bridleway from Keswick to Skiddaw, stands Jenkin Hill (735 metres, 2,411 ft), this flat-topped height being regarded as an outlier of Little Man.

== Geology ==
Geologically, Little Man consists of Skiddaw slate and the summit of the fell is made up of grassy patches within large areas of slate.

== Summit ==
Little Man's convex southern slopes give it a more open outlook than Skiddaw's own summit, despite Little Man being the lower of the two tops. Alfred Wainwright described the view south from Little Man as taking in the valleys and lakes of northern Lakeland together with many of the district's best-known fells, rating it among the finest in the area.

== Ascents ==
Many people climb Little Man via the tourist path from Keswick on the way to the summit of Skiddaw. However, there are several better and more interesting but steep ascents from the hamlets of Millbeck and Applethwaite to the south of the fell. One of the routes from Millbeck is a scrambler's route up the steep south west Arête.

== Gallery ==
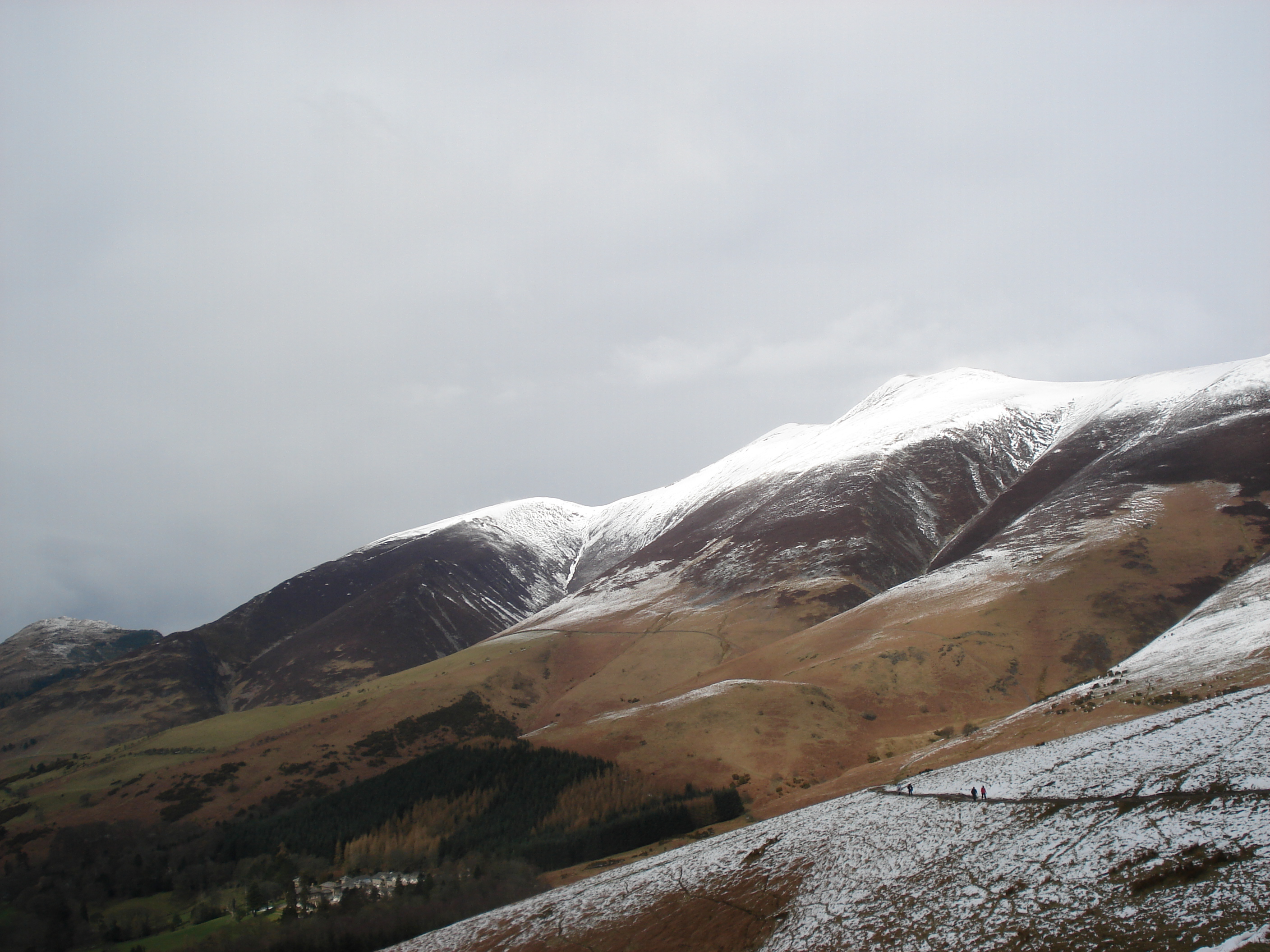
Skiddaw and Skiddaw Little Man from Latrigg

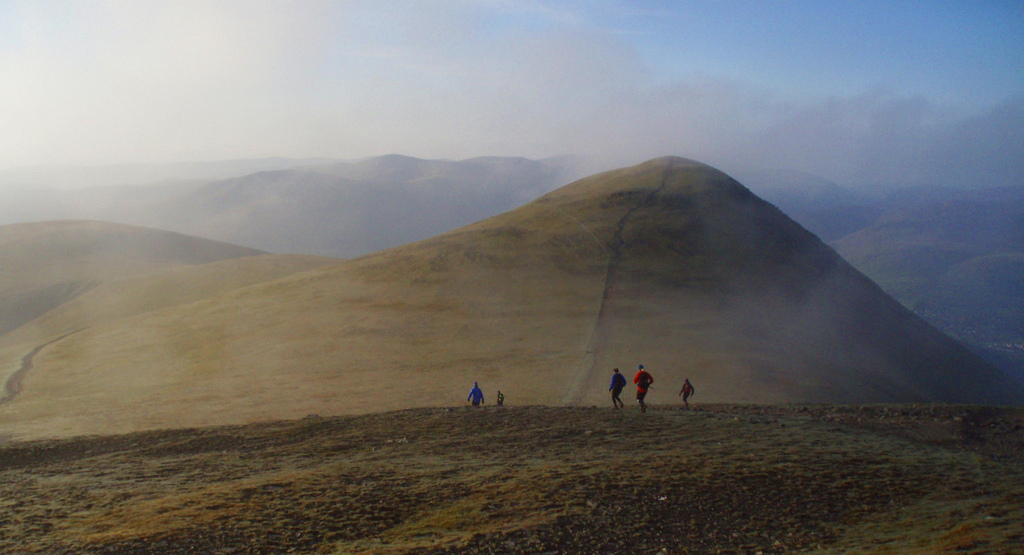
Skiddaw little man from the Keswick path

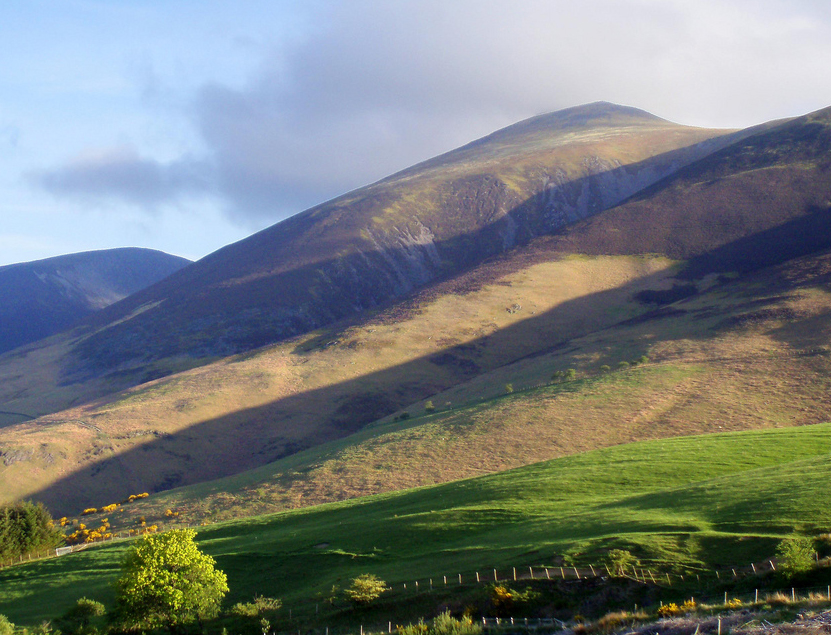
Skiddaw little man from Latrigg col
