= Latrigg =

Mountain in United Kingdom

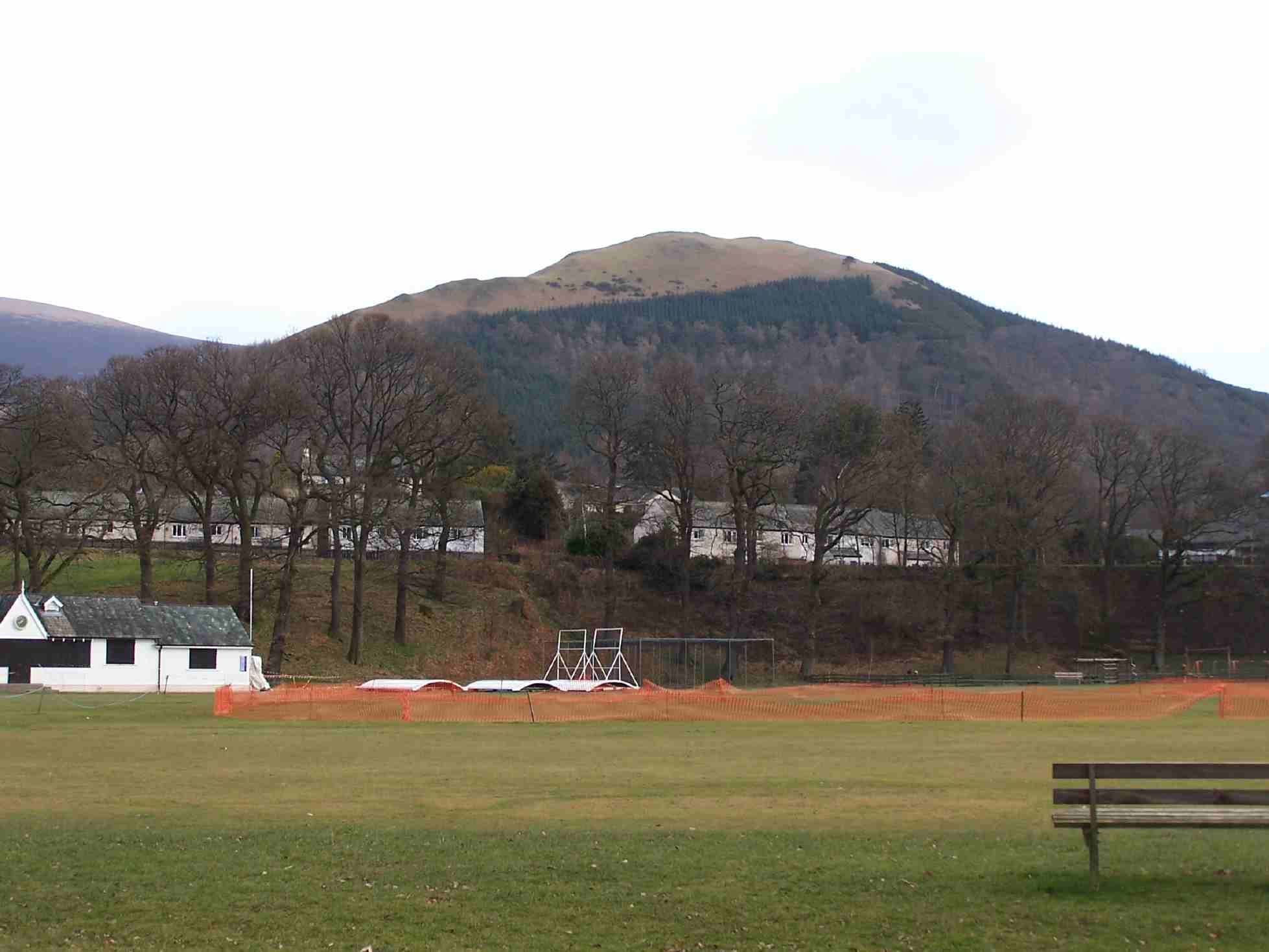
- Latrigg as seen from Fitz Park in Keswick.

Highest point
- Elevation: 368 m (1,207 ft)
- Prominence: c. 70 m
- Parent peak: Skiddaw
- Listing: Wainwright
- Coordinates: 54°36′44″N 3°07′04″W

Geography
- Location within the Lake District
- Location: Cumbria, England
- Parent range: Lake District, Northern Fells
- OS grid: NY279247
- Topo map: OS Landrangers 89, 90, Explorer OL4

Latrigg is one of the lowest fells in the Lake District in North West England, but is a popular climb due to its convenient location overlooking the town of Keswick and the beautiful views down the valley of Borrowdale from the summit. It is the least mountainous of the Skiddaw fells, the summit being almost entirely devoid of rock. The slopes of Latrigg are partially wooded, and logging work is currently being undertaken. One lone tree just south of the summit is prominently viewed in silhouette when approaching Keswick from the west along the A66. It also has petrified trees on top.

== Etymology ==
The name Latrigg is first attested in 1220, in the form Laterhayheved; this name was succeeded by 1666 by the form Latterig. In the assessment of Diana Whaley, the origins of the name "are doubtful". Laterhayheved ends with the Old English word hēafod (literally "head" but in place-names meaning "summit, top, high place"); the hay element of the same name might come from Old English gehæg or hege (both meaning "enclosure"). Evidently this had come to compete with an alternative form deriving from Old Norse hryggr ("ridge"), which underlies the modern form Latrigg. But the origins of the shared first element of both names are uncertain: Whaley suggested either Old Norse látr ("lair") or Old Irish lettir ("slope").

The name Mallen Dodd, first attested in 1867 and denoting the steep, rounded spur that is the northern part of Latrigg, contains the dialectal word dodd, whose origins are uncertain but which in local usage denotes a rounded hill-top. The element Mallen may come from the personal name Mal(l)in, a nickname for people called Mary, in which case the name once meant "Mary's hill-top", or from Old Irish maoilinn ("bare round hillock"), in which case the Irish name was once independent but was later supplemented by the tautologous English word dodd.

== Topography ==
Latrigg is the most southerly top of the Skiddaw massif and of the Northern Fells as a whole. It takes the form of a rounded hump at the terminus of a long descending ridge, and would be unremarkable if not for its location. To the north of Latrigg summit is an unnamed depression at about 970 feet (300 metres) and rising beyond is a grassy rigg, climbing up to Jenkin Hill and the top of Skiddaw Little Man. Latrigg itself sends out a narrow ridge to the east that is about a mile long and ends at Brundholm.

The fell is bordered by the two streams falling from the northern col. Gale Gill runs west to join the River Derwent between Derwentwater and Bassenthwaite Lake. The unnamed eastern stream joins Whit Beck and then flows into the River Greta, bound again for the Derwent via Keswick.

The steep southern slopes are cloaked in the mixed woodland of Brundholme Wood and Whinny Brow, Latrigg's only crags being hidden in the trees. A public road from Keswick contours across this slope at around 600 feet (180 metres) and gives access to the farms of Lonscale and Brundholm. Further mixed woodland has been planted on the north eastern slopes above Whit Beck. To the north west, on either bank of Gale Gill, are the conifer plantations of Birkett Wood and Mallen Dodd. A single track road climbs up the slope beside the wood and gives access to a car park on the depression to the north of the fell.

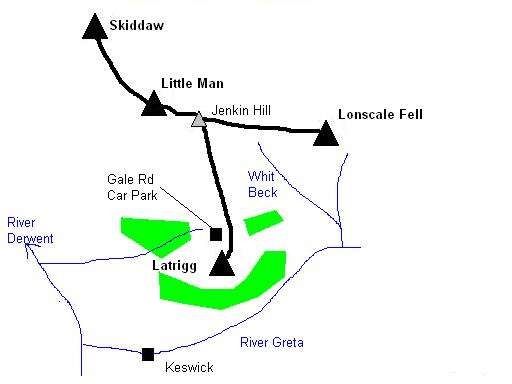
sketch map of Latrigg

== Geology ==
In common with much of the Northern Fells the Kirk Stile Formation of the Skiddaw Group predominates. This is composed of laminated mudstone and siltstone with greywacke sandstone and is of Ordovician age. Two rock-slope failures exist on the southern slopes of Latrigg northeast of Keswick.

== Summit ==
The top of the fell is sheep pasture, falling gently to the north and quite steeply to the south. Some stumps remain at the top of the southern slope as evidence of past deforestation, together with few small trees, bent down by the prevailing wind. A ditch and parapet run across the top. The parapet was the base of a fence, long since decayed, and the ditch was the source of the earth for its construction.

The view northward is of the high grassy flanks of Skiddaw and Blencathra, impressive but lacking detail. To the south the contrast is total. Looking out over Keswick and down the full length of Derwentwater, the eye is drawn to Borrowdale and the high fells of Central Lakeland. Wainwright was moved to describe "a panorama of crowded detail, all of it of great beauty: indeed this scene is one of the gems of the district...The far horizon is a jumbled upheaval of peaks, with many dear old friends standing up proudly."

Atop the summit, is a distinctive tree known as The Witch, given its shape which resembles a person riding a broomstick.

== Ascents ==
Commonly Latrigg is ascended from Keswick, the route beginning along Spooney Green Lane near the old railway station and then either making direct for the top or swinging north via Mallen Dodd. Threlkeld is another starting point, first crossing the Glenderaterra Beck and then climbing up the east ridge. The easiest way is to park at the end of Gale Road, from where the summit is a simple 10‑minute stroll on grass, the most accessible of all the 214 Wainwrights. This car park is commonly used as the starting point for the ascent of Skiddaw, although the purist will first climb Latrigg from Keswick before setting foot upon its parent. A recently constructed path allows disabled access to the summit of Latrigg from the car park.

== Gallery ==
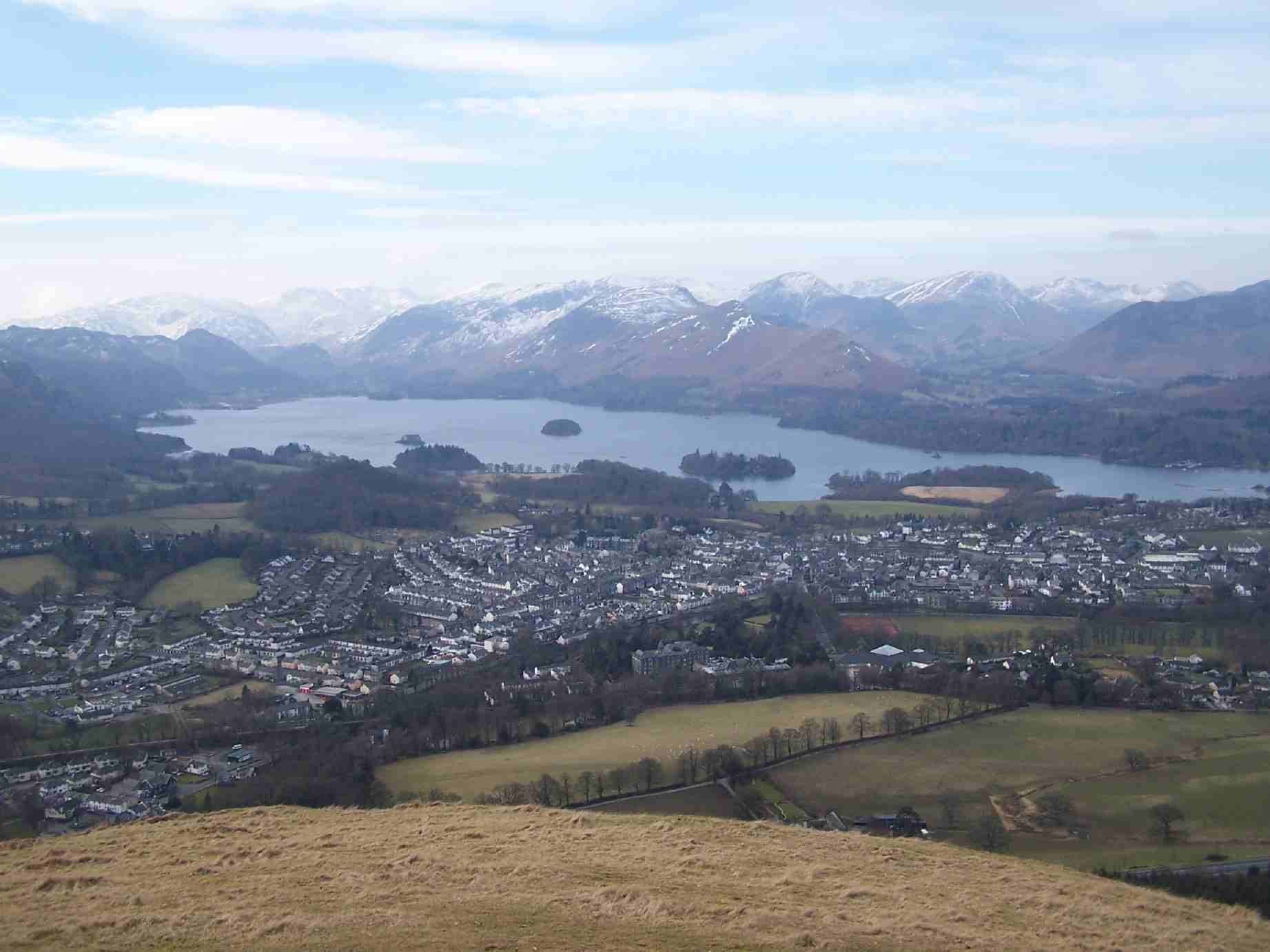
Keswick and Derwent Water seen from Latrigg summit.

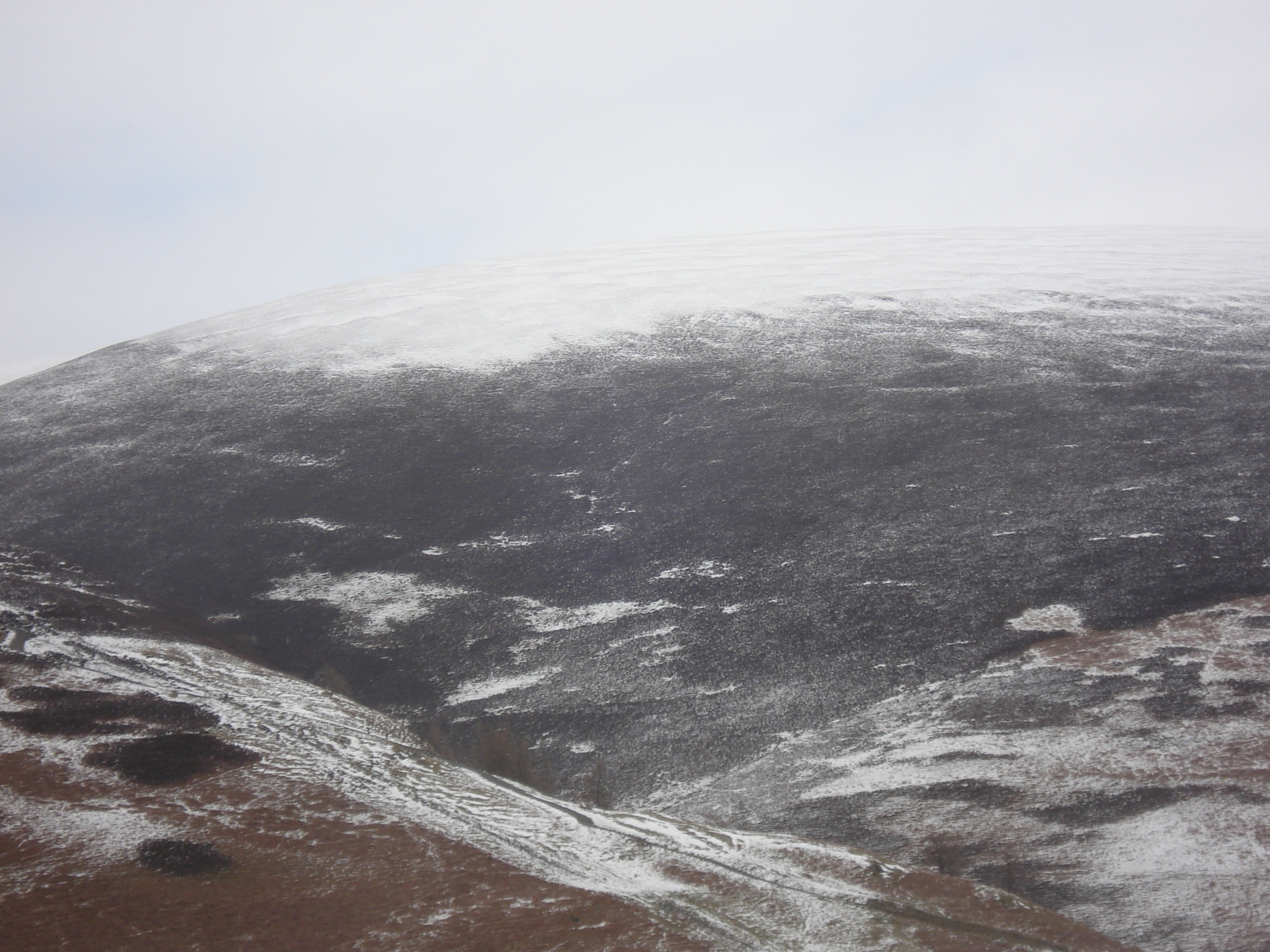
Skiddaw in the fog from Latrigg.

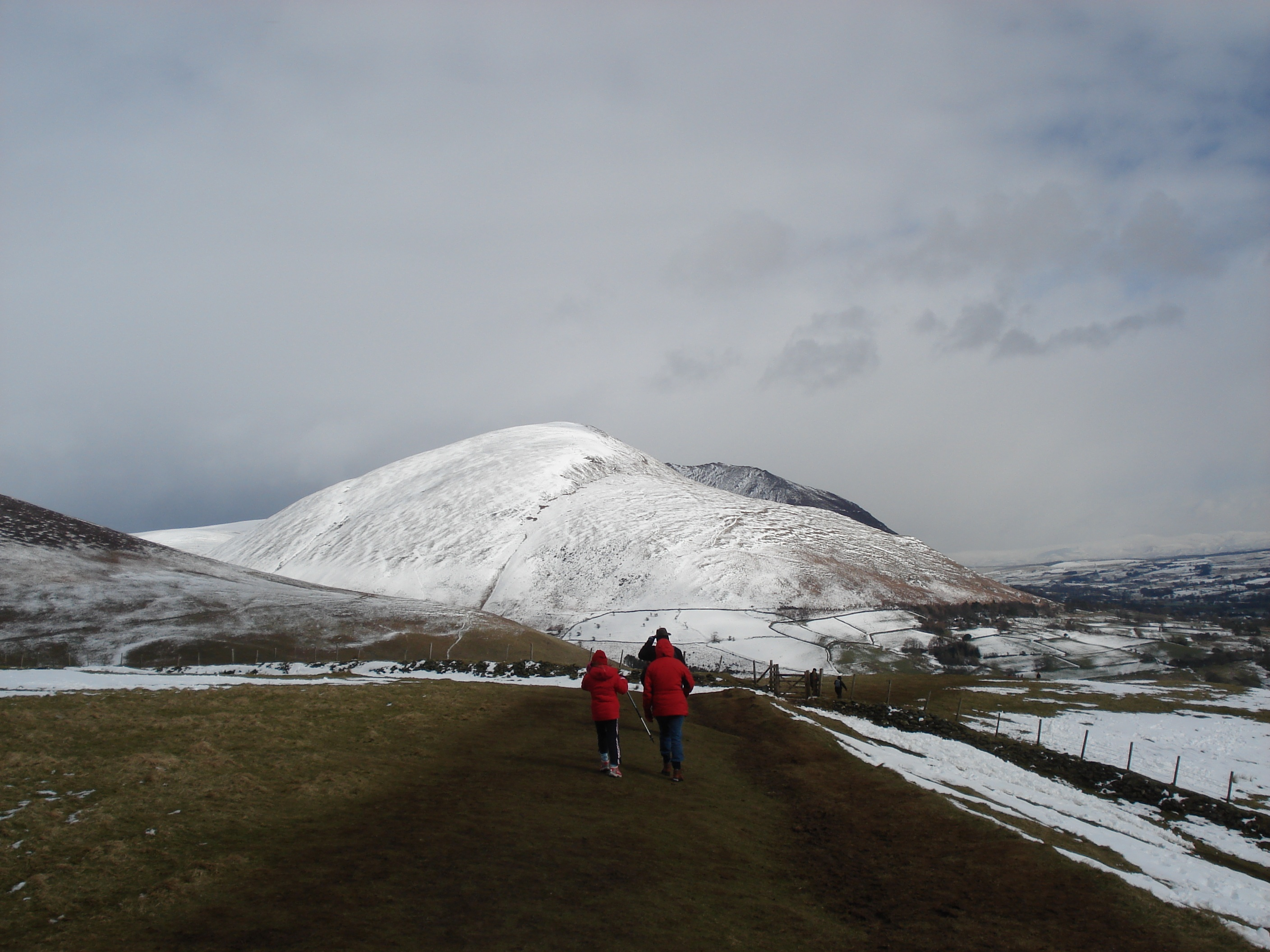
Blencathra from Latrigg
