= Skiddaw =

Mountain in the Lake District, England

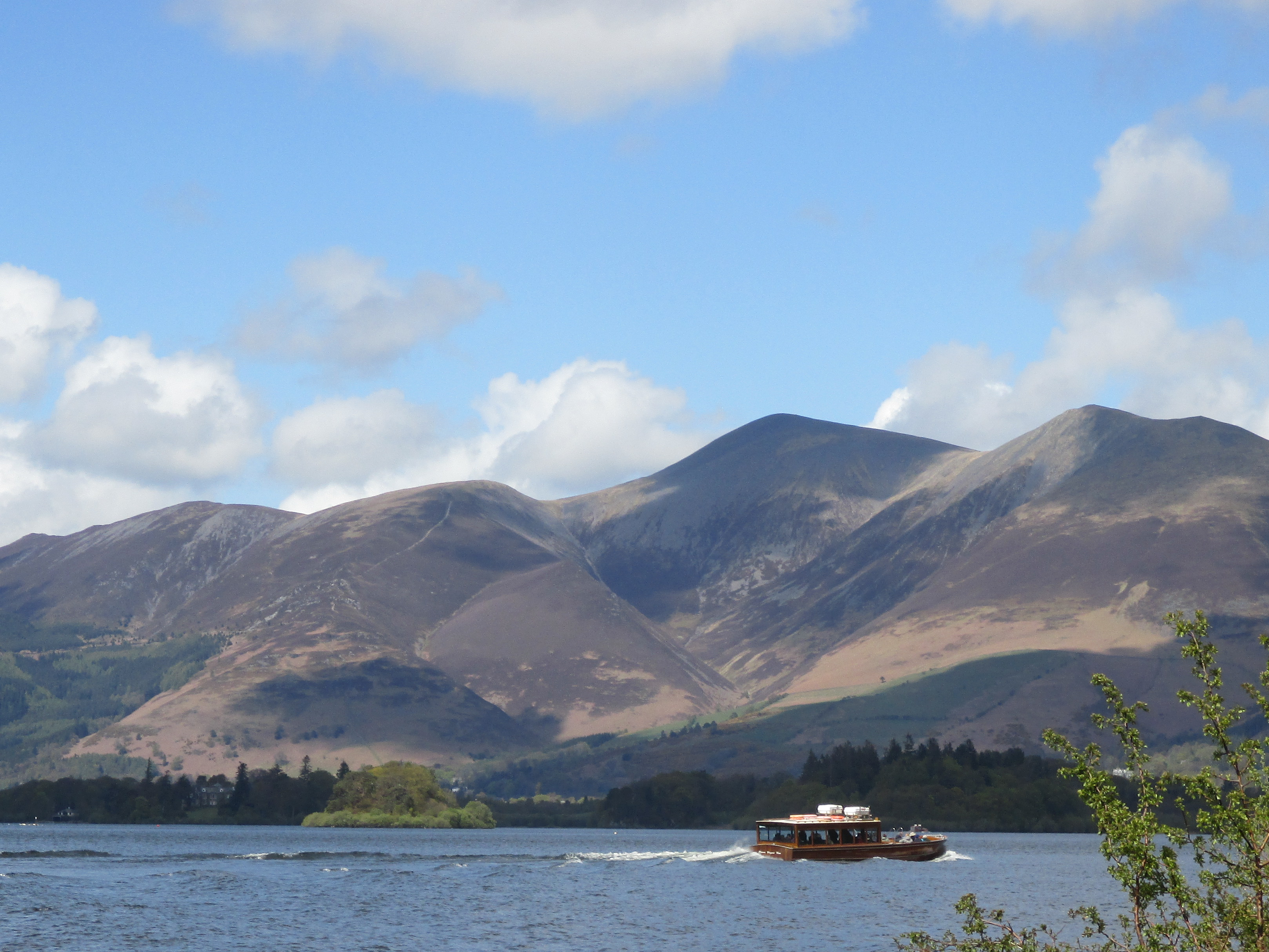
- Skiddaw from Ashness, Derwentwater

Highest point
- Elevation: 931 m (3,054 ft)
- Prominence: 709 m (2,326 ft)
- Listing: P600 Furth, Marilyn, Hewitt, Wainwright, Nuttall
- Coordinates: 54°39′04″N 3°08′53″W

Geography
- Location within the Lake District
- Location: Cumbria, England
- Parent range: Lake District, Northern Fells
- OS grid: NY260290
- Topo map: OS Landrangers 89, 90, Explorer OL4

Listed summits of Skiddaw
Name	Grid ref	Height	Status
Sale How	NY276286	666 m (2,185 ft)	Nuttall

Skiddaw is a mountain in the Lake District National Park in England. Its 931-metre (3,054 ft) summit is traditionally considered to be the fourth-highest peak but depending on what topographic prominence is thought to be significant is also variously ranked as the third- and the sixth-highest in England. It lies just north of the town of Keswick, Cumbria, in the historic county of Cumberland and dominates the skyline in this part of the northern lakes. It is the simplest of the Lake District mountains of this height to ascend (as there is a well-trodden tourist track from a car park to the north-east of Keswick, near the summit of Latrigg) and, as such, many walking guides recommend it to the occasional walker wishing to climb a mountain. This is the first summit of the fell running challenge known as the Bob Graham Round when undertaken in a clockwise direction.

The mountain lends its name to the surrounding areas of Skiddaw Forest and Back o' Skidda, and to the isolated Skiddaw House, situated to the east, formerly a shooting lodge and subsequently a youth hostel. It also provides the name for the slate derived from that region: Skiddaw slate. Skiddaw slate has been used to make tuned percussion musical instruments or lithophones, such as the Musical Stones of Skiddaw held at the Keswick Museum and Art Gallery.

== Topography ==
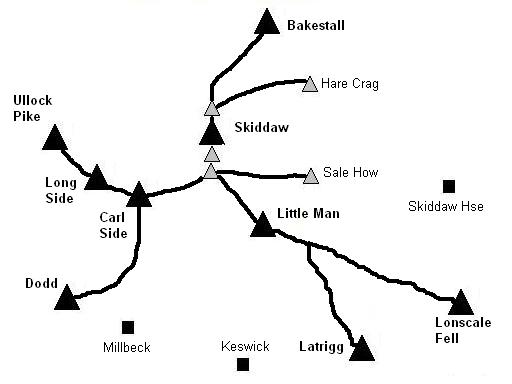
Sketch map of the Skiddaw locality

The Northern Fells make up a roughly circular upland area approaching 10 miles (16 kilometres) in width. At the centre is the marshy depression of Skiddaw Forest, a treeless plateau, or valley, at an elevation of about 400 metres (1,300 feet); flowing outwards from here are the rivers that divide the area into three sectors. "Forest" is used here in its original sense, meaning land used for hunting, rather than a woodland. The south-western sector, between the Glenderaterra Beck and Dash Beck, contains Skiddaw and its satellites.

Skiddaw itself takes the form of a north–south ridge about 1/2 mile (800 metres) long, with steep slopes to east and west. The ridge continues northwards over Broad End to Bakestall, a fell overlooking the Whitewater Dash waterfall. Further ridges fan out east and west from the southern end of Skiddaw. To the south-east are Skiddaw Little Man, Lonscale Fell and Latrigg, an easily accessible viewpoint for Keswick and Derwentwater. Beyond these fells are the Glenderaterra Beck and the Blencathra group. The south-western ridge curves round through 180 degrees to run north above the shore of Bassenthwaite Lake. This gives Skiddaw an 'outer wall', comprising Carl Side, Long Side and Ullock Pike, collectively referred to as Longside Edge. The final member of the Skiddaw Group is Dodd, a satellite of Carl Side.

Between Skiddaw and Longside Edge are the quiet valleys of Southerndale and Barkbethdale, separated by the spur of Buzzard Knott. These drain the western flanks of the fell to Bassenthwaite Lake. The eastern side of Skiddaw drains into Skiddaw Forest, much of the water reaching Candleseaves Bog. This marsh is the source of both the Dash Beck flowing north west to Bassenthwaite and the River Caldew, beginning its long journey north-eastward to the Solway Firth via Carlisle. Two smooth spurs on this eastern flank of Skiddaw, Sale How and Hare Crag, are listed as separate tops in some guidebooks. Sale How is also a Nuttall.

Skiddaw's slopes are generally rounded and convex, looking from a distance as though a thick velvet blanket has been draped over a supporting frame. On the ridges the general terrain is of loose stones, but elsewhere all is grass and heather. Wainwright noted that "Its lines are smooth, its curves graceful; but because the slopes are steep everywhere, the quick build-up of the “massif” from valley levels to central summit is appreciated at a glance — and it should be an appreciative glance, for such massive strength and such beauty of outline rarely go together."

== Geology ==
The bedrock of Skiddaw, commonly known as Skiddaw Slate, is the Kirkstile Formation. This Ordovician rock is composed of laminated mudstone and siltstone with greywacke sandstone. At the summit this is overlain by scree and to the south are areas where the underlying Loweswater Formation surfaces.

== Summit ==
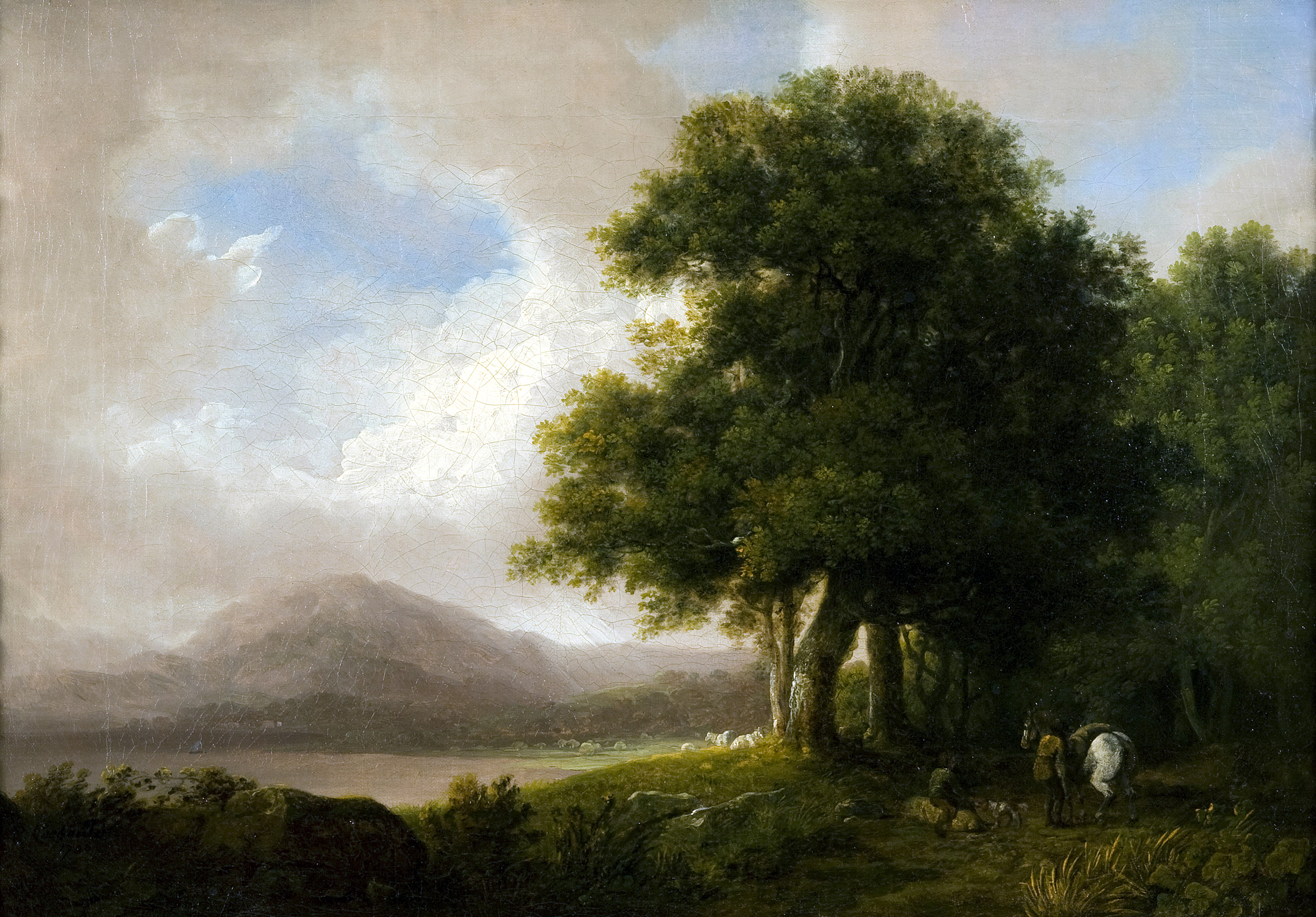
Skiddaw from Derwentwater, by Richard Corbould (1757–1831)

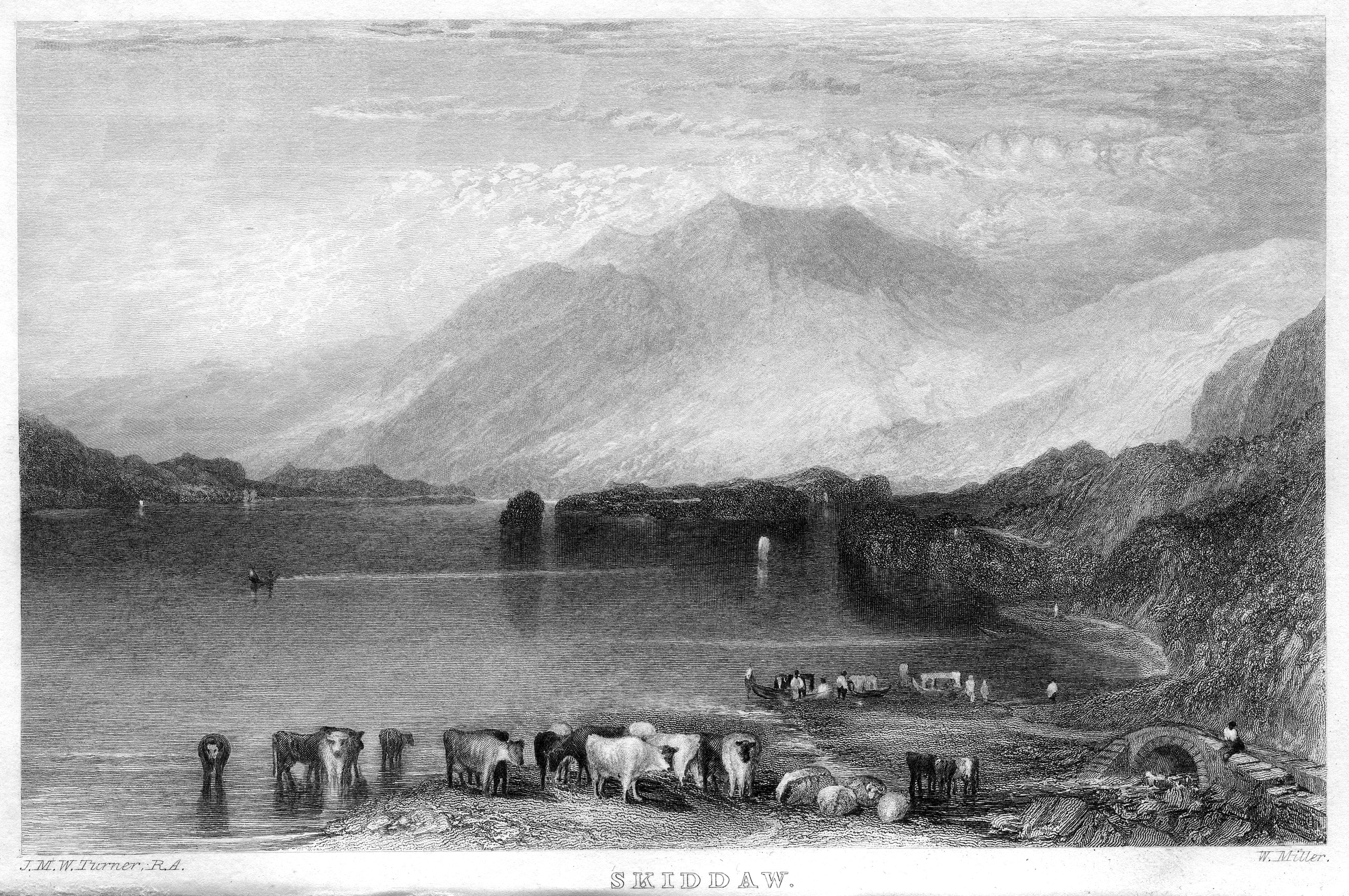
Skiddaw after J. M. W. Turner (1833)

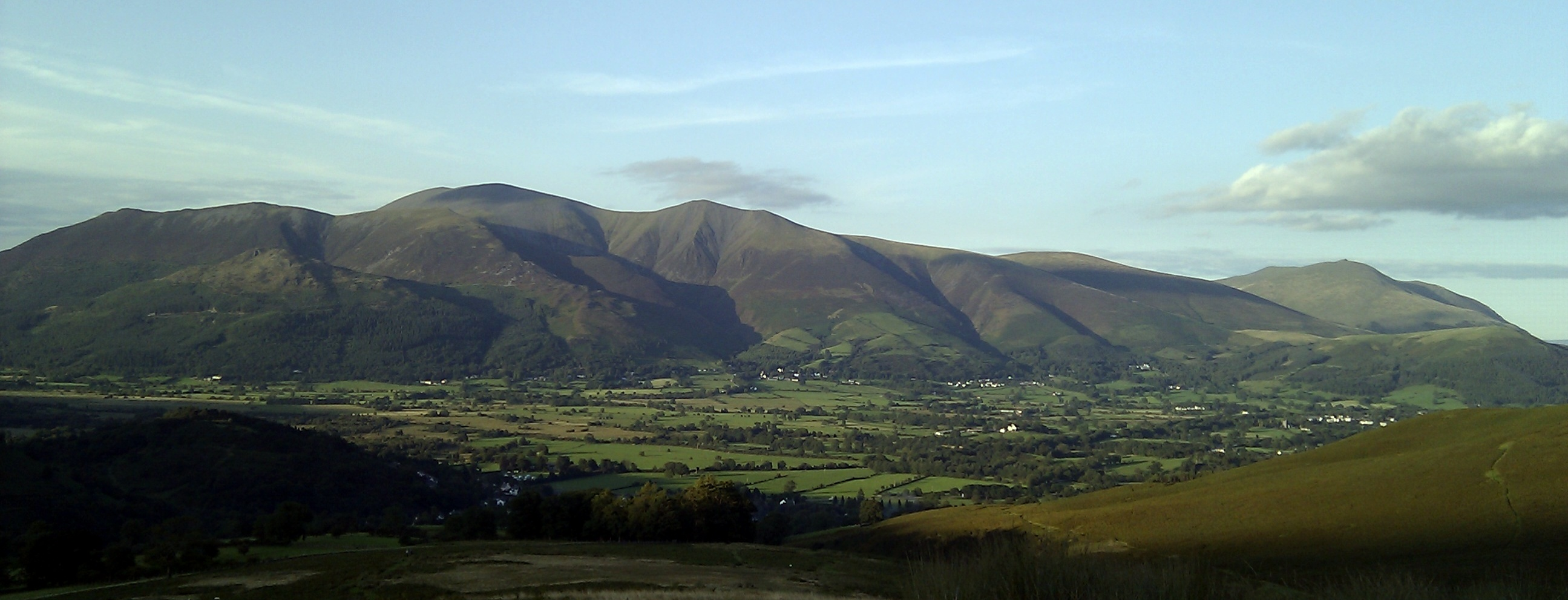
Skiddaw Massif as seen from Outerside Fell

The summit ridge bears a number of tops, which from north to south are known as North Top, High Man (the summit), Middle Top and South Top. All now bear cairns and a number of stone windshelters have been erected. Skiddaw has a subsidiary summit, Little Man, which lies about 1.5 kilometres (1 mile) south-south-east of the main peak. Despite its limited independence, Wainwright listed it as a separate fell in his influential Pictorial Guide to the Lakeland Fells, a convention which is often followed. Skiddaw Little Man has its own subsidiary summit, known as Lesser Man.

The view is as panoramic as might be expected, given Skiddaw's topographic prominence. From High Man the north east quadrant is filled by the quiet fells of Back o'Skiddaw, with the Border hills, the Cheviots and the North Pennines behind them. To the south east are Blencathra, the Far Eastern Fells and the Helvellyn range; behind these are vistas of the Yorkshire Dales and Forest of Bowland. The Coniston Fells are visible directly to the south. On the other side of South Top is a fine view of the Scafells, Western and North Western Fells, with a portion of Snowdonia visible between Kirk Fell and Pillar. The Isle of Man is visible 60 miles (100 kilometres) away, as are the Mourne Mountains 120 miles (195 km) away (on exceptionally clear days). The final quarter is taken up by the coastal plain and the distant Solway Firth, backed by the hills of Galloway such as Merrick and Criffel, and Broad Law in the Scottish Borders. Goat Fell on Arran can be seen at an angle of 313 degrees, 105 miles (170 km) away.

The most distant view is of Slieve Meelmore in the Mountains of Mourne in County Down, Northern Ireland, 120 miles (195 km) distant.

By moving to South Top a superb view of Borrowdale can be brought into sight.

== Ascents ==
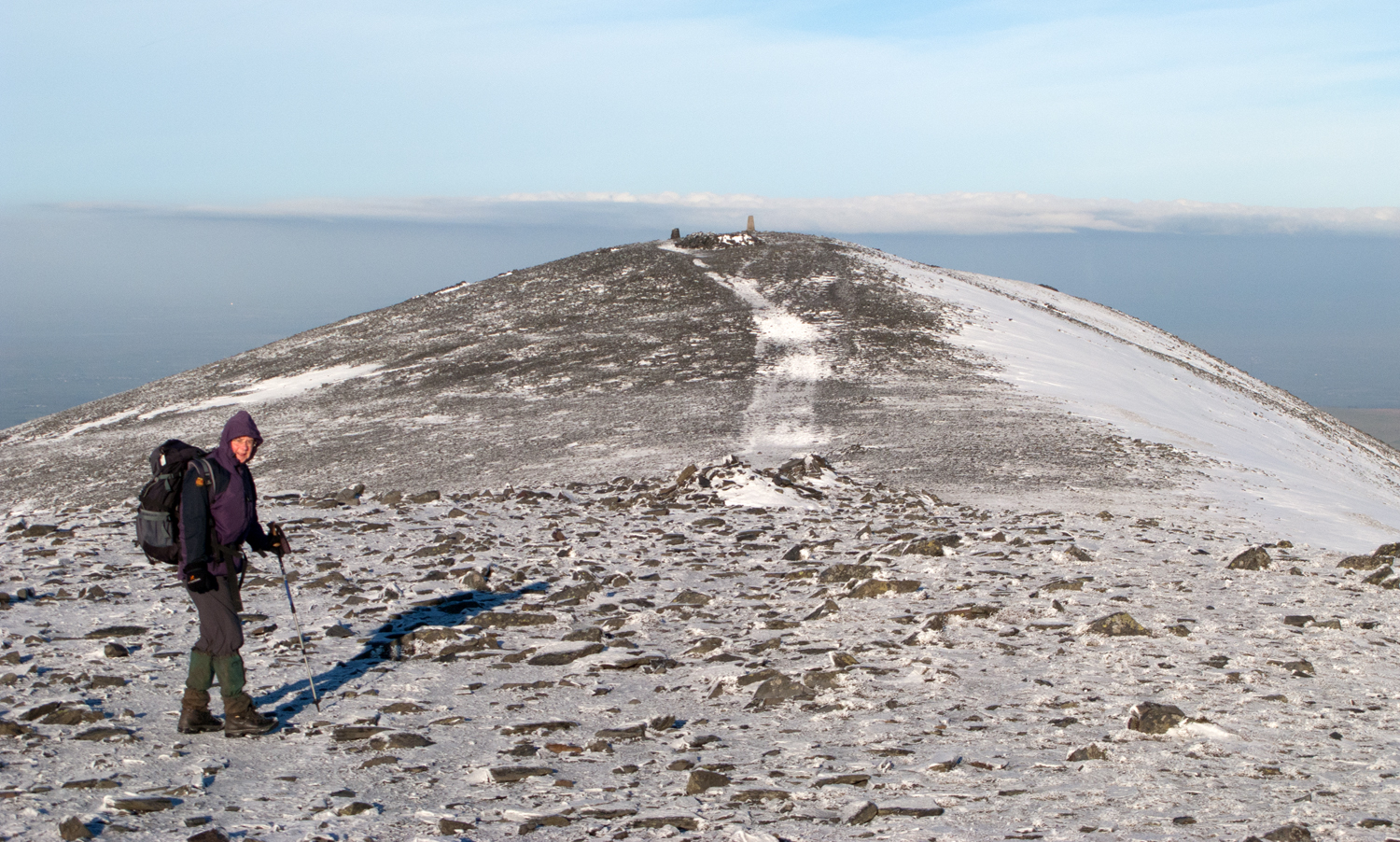
Summit ridge

Many routes of ascent have been devised for Skiddaw; indeed, it is hard to devise a challenging approach in good conditions. The most popular tourist route starts from Keswick and first ascends behind Latrigg, before the climb continues over the slopes of Little Man to the summit. About 200 metres (660 ft) of ascent can be saved by driving to the top of Gale Road and beginning from the public car park just behind the summit of Latrigg.

Another popular route (and the one recommended by Wainwright) is to follow Longside Edge, first ascending Ullock Pike, Longside and Carl Side before making the steep climb up from Carlside Col. Also from the north, a somewhat tougher alternative is to walk up Buzzard Knott between Southerndale and Barkbethdale: after crossing to the southern edge of the shoulder above Randel Crag ascend due east to the summit. Rather easier than either of these is the compass-walk due south from Cock Up (505 metres (1,657 ft)); reversing this route provides a safe descent, especially in bad weather. Scramblers may prefer simply to walk up Southerndale and climb Longside via a distinctive crevice seen easily from Skiddaw summit.

From the south-west at Millbeck, Carlside Col can be reached directly. A start from nearby Applethwaite can also be used to provide a variation to the tourist route. From the north-west a tough but picturesque ascent can be made to the northern end of Longside Edge before following the ridge route to the summit. Finally, ascents from due east are possible for the walker who first makes for Skiddaw House, a good distance from either Keswick, Threlkeld or Peter House. Once Skiddaw House is reached a fairly direct line is possible, climbing over either Sale How or Hare Crag.

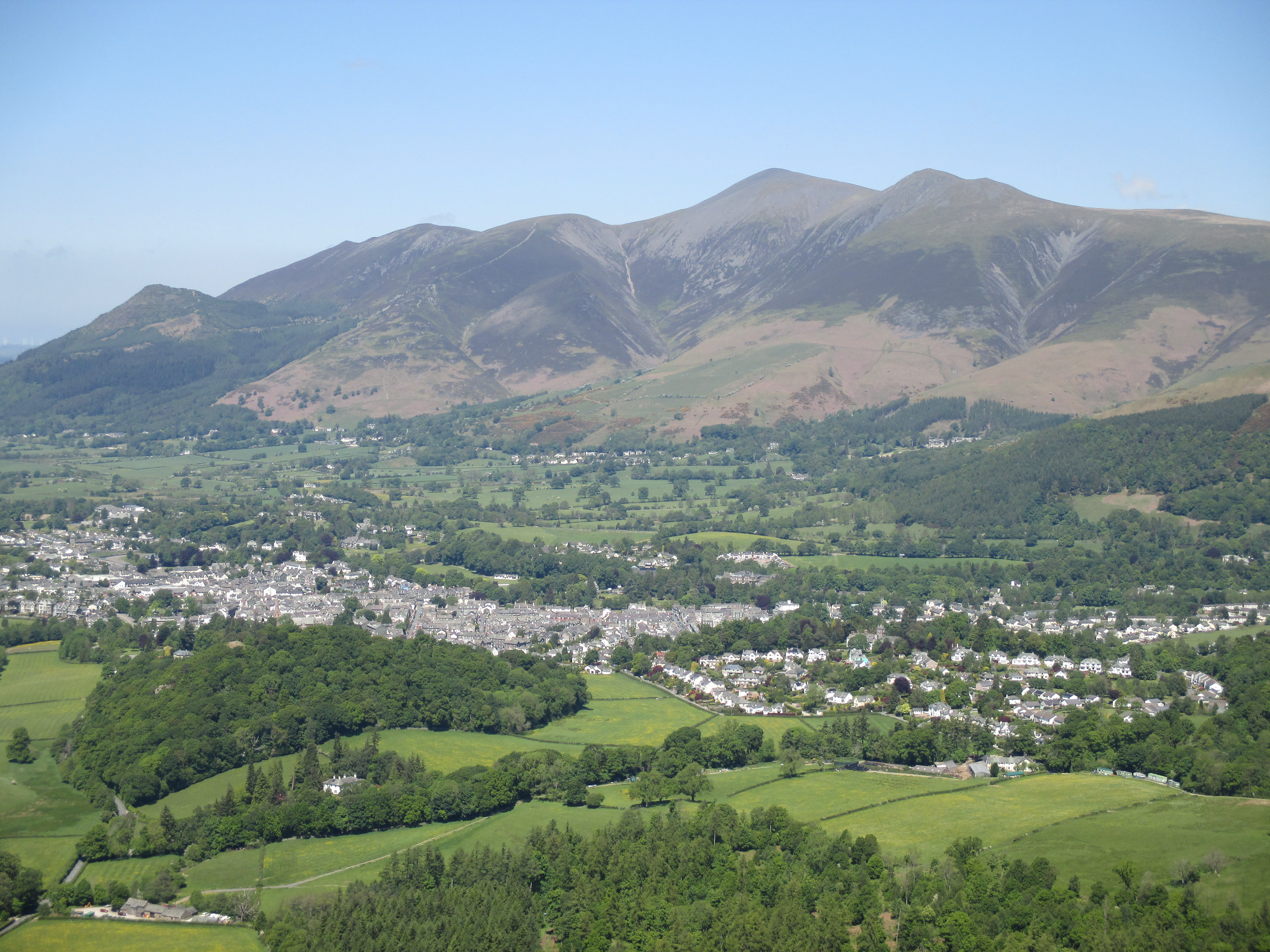
Skiddaw with Keswick at its foot

From the north-east an unmarked but quite easy and fairly well-worn path starts at Whitewater Dash waterfall (on the Cumbrian Way) where the walker can follow the fence (along Birkett Edge just south of Dead Crags) past the Bakestall outcrop, and follow the fence until just before the unnamed top at 831 metres (2,726 ft). From the 831m top, a path leads directly to Skiddaw Man.

== Toponymy ==
Early forms of the name from the include Skythou in c.1260 and Skydehow in 1247. According to Eilert Ekwall, Skiddaw's name is derived from the Old Norse elements skyti or skut + haugr meaning either "archer's hill" or "jutting crag hill". Diana Whaley likewise interprets it as "the mountain with the jutting crag", but also offers the alternative that the first element may be a personal name or Old Norse skítr 'dung, filth, shit'. Richard Coates suggests that "it is possible that a Cumbric solution is to be sought."

== Skiddaw House ==
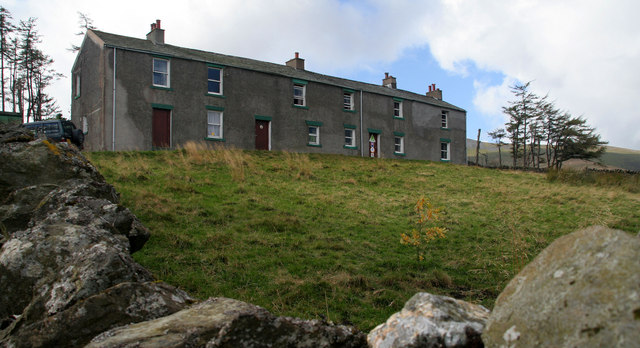
Skiddaw House

Below Sale How, at an elevation of 470 metres (1,540 ft) is Skiddaw House, a stone building which has variously served as a shooting lodge, a shepherd's bothy and a Youth Hostel. Its windbreak comprises the only trees in Skiddaw Forest, and it is reached by a long access track up the Dash Valley.

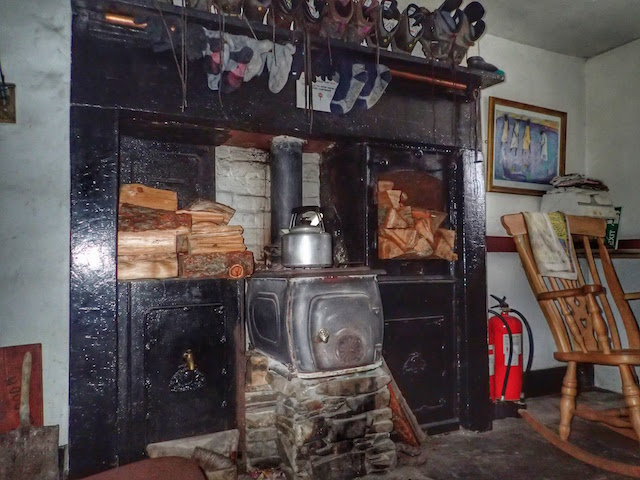
Kitchen range

Built around 1829 by the Earl of Egremont, it was originally a keeper's lodge: a base for grouse shooting and for the gamekeepers who managed the extensive land owned by Egremont in Skiddaw Forest.

Little is known of the house in the 19th century, but it was used by both gamekeepers and shepherds beyond 1860 and there were rooms for Egremont and the shooting parties. Canon Rawnsley, a founder of the National Trust, visited in about 1900 and mentions in one of his books the hospitality of the shepherd's family at that time. Sir Hugh Walpole, author of the Lake District novel Rogue Herries, was a visitor in the 1920s and 30s and used the house as the scene, set in 1854, of the murder by Uhland.

These arrangements for accommodation continued until the early 1950s. Several families brought up their children there until they were able to go to school, but the longest tenure was possibly that of Pearson Dalton, a shepherd and bachelor from the Caldbeck area, who came to stay for a month in 1952 and left in 1969 aged 75. He lived there alone for five days a week, only going home for long weekends with his sister in Caldbeck, then returning on the Monday to resume his duties. By that time farming practices had changed and the house was no longer needed; it declined, although there was intermittent use by various schools and outdoor groups.

In 1986 the house was leased by John Bothamley, who had created the YHA Carrock Fell Hostel 13 kilometres (8 miles) away; and eventually the building was handed over to the YHA. It closed in 2002 following a disagreement over the lease. In 2007 it re-opened as an independent hostel run by the Skiddaw House Foundation, under the YHA's Enterprise franchising model.

== 2024 purchase ==
In 2024, 1,200 hectares (3,000 acres) of Skiddaw Forest was purchased by the Cumbria Wildlife Trust for £6.25m, as part of a long-term rewilding project, which the trust says will see the re-introduction of hen harriers, black grouse, water voles, aspen and rare upland bumblebees. The plan includes planting 300,000 native trees over 250 hectares (620 acres) of the site (but specifically excluding the summit of Skiddaw). The peat bogs that cover one third of the site will be rewetted by blocking drains and holding back water so that the peat remains saturated. The purchase was partly funded by a £5m grant from Aviva, with a public appeal being launched to raise the balance. The forest forms part of the Skiddaw Group SSSI, a Site of Special Scientific Interest.

== Civil parish ==
Skiddaw was a civil parish until 1 April 1934, when it was merged with Underskiddaw. In 1931 it had a population of 5.

== In literature ==
In "A Stranger Minstrel" (published 1800), Samuel Taylor Coleridge remarks on Skiddaw's characteristic "helm of cloud", and observes atmospheric effects and the play of sunlight across the landscape: "yon small flaky mists that love to creep / Along the edges of those spots of light, / Those sunny islands on thy smooth green heights." Coleridge also mentioned Skiddaw in the valediction of his mnemonic poem "Metrical Feet," which he addressed to his son Derwent, who had been born nearby; he wrote, "Could you stand upon Skiddaw, you would not from its whole ridge / See a man who so loves you as your fond S.T. Coleridge."

Skiddaw is mentioned in the fourth book of John Keats's poem Endymion: "…with all the stress / Of vision search'd for him, as one would look […] from old Skiddaw's top, when fog conceals / His rugged forehead in a mantle pale, / With an eye-guess towards some pleasant vale / Descry a favourite hamlet faint and far."

Skiddaw is also mentioned in the final lines of the poem The Armada by Thomas Babington Macaulay, Lord Macaulay:

"Till Skiddaw saw the fire that burned on Gaunt's embattled pile,
And the red glare on Skiddaw roused the burghers of Carlisle."

== See also ==
"Skiddaw" is also a former name for Mount Wellington, Tasmania, which also overlooks a River Derwent (River Derwent, Tasmania, rather than River Derwent, Cumbria).
