= Skiddaw Slate =

Early Ordovician metamorphosed sedimentary rock

Skiddaw slate is an early Ordovician metamorphosed sedimentary rock, as first identified on the slopes of Skiddaw in the English Lake District.

The base of this series is unknown. The thickness could, therefore, amount to several thousand feet of sediment. These sediments were formed about 500 mya by deposition in a shallow sea, low-energy environment. The series contains differing grain sizes and comprises grits, flags, shales and mudstones.

In some places, there is evidence of intrusion of Skiddaw Granite into the Skiddaw Slates, close to the anticlinal axis of the Lake District.

Skiddaw slate has a grey hue (as opposed to Honister slate which has a green hue) and is used for building, in the Lake District. The traditional buildings of Keswick and other settlements are almost entirely of Skiddaw slate. The slate is also used for making souvenirs, monuments, ornaments etc. Smaller fragments are used for gravels or for ornamental pathways.
